= Protected areas of Queensland =

Overview of protected areas in Queensland, Australia

Queensland is the second-largest state in Australia. As at 2020, it contained more than 1,000 protected areas. In August 2023, it was estimated a total of 14.5 million hectares or 8.38% of Queensland's landmass was protected.

In 2026, several changes were made to Queensland’s national park system. Keatings Lagoon Conservation Park was redesignated as Keatings Lagoon National Park, while Mount Cook National Park became Waymbuurr (Mount Cook) National Park (CYPAL). Waalmbaal Birri (Endeavour River) National Park (CYPAL) was established, with the remaining Endeavour River National Park substantially reduced in area. Later in the year, Miara National Park was also established. The changes since August 2023 have added at least about 400,000 hectares (4,000 km²), bring the total protected landmass to 14.9 million hectares or 8.61% of Queensland.

== List of terrestrial protected areas ==
=== Conservation Parks ===
- Anderson Street
- Archer Point
- Baddow Island
- Baffle Creek
- Bakers Creek
- Baldwin Swamp
- Bare Hill
- Barubbra Island
- Baywulla Creek
- Beachmere
- Beelbi Creek
- Bell Creek
- Bingera 1
- Bingera 2
- Bird Island
- Blackwater
- Bloomfield River
- Bloomsbury
- Boat Mountain 1
- Boat Mountain 2
- Bottle Creek
- Boyne Island
- Broadwater
- Buccan
- Buckleys Hole
- Bullock Creek
- Bullyard
- Bunya Mountains
- Bunyaville
- Burleigh Knoll
- Byron Creek
- Cabbage Tree Point
- Calliope
- Caloundra
- Cape Pallarenda
- Carbrook Wetlands
- Carello Palm Swamp
- Carraba
- Causeway Lake
- Charon Point
- Combo 1
- Combo 2
- Coolmunda
- Cooloothin
- Coombabah Lake
- Cressbrook
- Currimundi Lake
- Currumbin Hill
- Daisy Hill
- Dawson River
- Delicia Road
- Denmark Hill
- Djilgarin
- Duggan
- Dwyers Scrub
- Etty Bay Road
- Eudlo Creek
- Fraser Island
- Five Rocks
- Flagstone Creek
- Fleays
- Fleays Wildlife Park
- Flinders Peak
- Futter Creek
- Garden Island
- Goat Island
- Goat Island (Noosa River)
- Granville
- Great Sandy
- Gurgeena
- Hallorans Hill
- Harry Spring
- Hays Inlet 1
- Hays Inlet 2
- Herberton Range
- Highworth Bend
- Horseshoe Bay Lagoon
- Horseshoe Lagoon
- Indooroopilly Island
- Ipswich Pteropus
- Irongate
- Jack Smith Scrub
- Jalum
- Joseph Banks (Round Hill Head)
- Jumrum Creek
- Kamerunga
- Keppel Sands
- Keyser Island
- King Island
- Kirrama
- Knapp Creek
- Kurrimine Beach
- Lake Broadwater
- Lake Murphy
- Lark Quarry
- Limestone Creek
- Long Island Bend
- Malanda Falls
- Maroochy River
- Meingan Creek
- Millstream
- Moggill
- Mon Repos
- Mooloolah (Marie Higgs)
- Morven
- Mount Beau Brummell
- Mount Blarney
- Mount Cooroy
- Mount Dumaresq
- Mount Eerwah
- Mount Hector
- Mount Hopeful
- Mount Kinchant
- Mount Leura
- Mount Perry
- Mount Scoria
- Mount Whitfield
- Mouth of Baffle Creek 1
- Mouth of Baffle Creek 2
- Mouth of Kolan River
- Mud Island
- Myora
- Neurum Creek
- Newport
- North Pointer
- O'Regan Creek
- Palm Creek
- Palmview
- Pine Ridge
- Plunkett
- Police Paddock
- Princhester
- Reinke Scrub
- Rosins Lookout
- Round Island
- Roundstone
- Samford Ferny Hills
- Serpentine Creek
- Sheep Island
- Sheep Station Creek
- Shoalwater Bay
- Six Mile Creek
- Skull Knob
- South Stradbroke Island 1
- South Stradbroke Island 2
- Speewah
- Spicers Gap Road
- Springwood
- St Helens Gap
- Tallebudgera Creek
- Tinana Creek
- Tinana Island
- Tingalpa Creek
- Tolderodden
- Tomewin
- Toohey Forest
- Tooloombah Creek
- Toorbul
- Townsville Town Common
- Vandyke Creek
- Vernon
- Wararba Creek
- Warrina
- Weyba Creek
- White Blow
- White Rock
- White Rock (Limited Depth)
- Wilandspey
- Woongoolba
- Zamia Creek

=== Conservation Reserves ===
- Mount Glorious

=== Feature Protection Areas ===
- Big Ironbark
- Booroobin
- Goggrell's Tree
- Jowarra
- Rosehall
- Unnamed (20 different areas)
- Western Creek

=== National Parks ===
* National park (Cape York Peninsula Aboriginal Land) jointly managed park
^ National park (scientific), under IUCN protected area category 1a

Name	Local government area	Area	Established	World Heritage Area	IBRA region	Coordinates	Notes
Albinia	Central Highlands	74 km^{2} (29 sq mi)	2008		BBN	24.475°S 148.492°E	
Alton	Balonne	5.58 km^{2} (2.15 sq mi)	1973		BBS	27.997°S 149.331°E	
Alwal*	Cook	425 km^{2} (164 sq mi)	2010		CYP	15.204°S 143.584°E	
Amamoor	Gympie	0.38 km^{2} (0.15 sq mi)	2006		SEQ	26.325°S 152.646°E	
Annan River (Yuku Baja-Muliku)	Cook	88 km^{2} (34 sq mi)	2006		CYP, WET	15.558°S 145.210°E	
Apudthama*	Cook	3,192 km^{2} (1,232 sq mi)	1977		CYP	11.355°S 142.630°E	
Astrebla Downs	Diamantina	1,760 km^{2} (680 sq mi)	1996		CHC, MGD	24.247°S 140.585°E	
Auburn River	North Burnett	4.05 km^{2} (1.56 sq mi)	1964		BBS	25.719°S 151.055°E	
Baga	Livingstone	1.44 km^{2} (0.56 sq mi)	1977		BBN	23.215°S 150.629°E	
Ban Ban	North Burnett, Gympie	20 km^{2} (7.7 sq mi)	2006		SEQ	25.832°S 151.966°E	
Bania	North Burnett, Bundaberg	331 km^{2} (128 sq mi)	2008		BBS, SEQ	24.981°S 151.482°E	
Barnard Island Group	Cassowary Coast	0.31 km^{2} (0.12 sq mi)	1936	Great Barrier Reef	WET	17.738°S 146.160°E	
Barron Gorge	Mareeba, Cairns	28 km^{2} (11 sq mi)	1940	Wet Tropics	WET	16.877°S 145.642°E	
Basilisk Range	Cassowary Coast	22 km^{2} (8.5 sq mi)	2010		WET	17.708°S 145.964°E	
Batavia*	Cook	560 km^{2} (220 sq mi)	2012		CYP	12.339°S 142.685°E	
Beeron	North Burnett	70 km^{2} (27 sq mi)	2009		BBS	26.005°S 151.316°E	
Bellthorpe	Moreton Bay, Somerset	76 km^{2} (29 sq mi)	2010		SEQ	26.874°S 152.712°E	
Benarkin	Somerset	2.18 km^{2} (0.84 sq mi)	2006		SEQ	26.760°S 152.171°E	
Bendidee	Goondiwindi	9.31 km^{2} (3.59 sq mi)	1979		BBS	28.298°S 150.519°E	
Beninbi	North Burnett	26 km^{2} (10 sq mi)	2006		SEQ	25.880°S 151.738°E	
Bingera	Bundaberg	54 km^{2} (21 sq mi)	2006		SEQ	25.028°S 152.316°E	
Biniirr*	Cook	293 km^{2} (113 sq mi)	2016		CYP	15.134°S 144.956°E	
Binya	Paroo	137 km^{2} (53 sq mi)	2009		MUL	28.847°S 145.612°E	
Blackbraes	Etheridge, Charters Towers, Flinders	514 km^{2} (198 sq mi)	1998		EIU, GUP	19.484°S 144.057°E	
Blackdown Tableland	Central Highlands	480 km^{2} (190 sq mi)	1980		BBS	23.814°S 149.101°E	
Blackwood	Charters Towers	16 km^{2} (6.2 sq mi)	1991		BBN	21.457°S 146.717°E	
Bladensburg	Winton	849 km^{2} (328 sq mi)	1984		CHC, MGD	22.642°S 143.066°E	
Bluff Hill	Mackay	18 km^{2} (6.9 sq mi)	2008		CMC	21.055°S 148.777°E	
Boodjamulla*	Burke, Mount Isa	3,451 km^{2} (1,332 sq mi)	1984	Australian Fossil Mammal Sites	GFU, GUP, MGD, MII	18.639°S 138.277°E	
Bowling Green Bay	Townsville, Burdekin	581 km^{2} (224 sq mi)	1940		BBN	19.507°S 146.960°E	
Brampton Islands	Mackay	10 km^{2} (3.9 sq mi)	1936	Great Barrier Reef	CMC	20.788°S 149.289°E	
Bribie Island	Moreton Bay, Sunshine Coast	86 km^{2} (33 sq mi)	1988		SEQ	26.899°S 153.124°E	
Broad Sound Islands	Livingstone, Isaac	28 km^{2} (11 sq mi)	1980	Great Barrier Reef	BBN, CMC	22.209°S 149.893°E	
Bromley (Ampulin)*	Cook	404 km^{2} (156 sq mi)	2004		CYP	12.136°S 142.975°E	
Bromley (Kungkaychi)*	Cook	107 km^{2} (41 sq mi)	2004		CYP	12.536°S 142.928°E	
Brook Islands	Cassowary Coast	0.64 km^{2} (0.25 sq mi)	1936	Great Barrier Reef	WET	18.140°S 146.282°E	
Bulburin	Gladstone, Bundaberg	344 km^{2} (133 sq mi)	2006		SEQ	24.550°S 151.513°E	
Bulleringa	Mareeba, Etheridge	544 km^{2} (210 sq mi)	1992		EIU, GUP	17.555°S 143.781°E	
Bunya Mountains	South Burnett, Western Downs, Toowoomba	195 km^{2} (75 sq mi)	1908		BBS, SEQ	26.819°S 151.535°E	
Burleigh Head	Gold Coast	0.28 km^{2} (0.11 sq mi)	1947		SEQ	28.095°S 153.457°E	
Burrum Coast	Bundaberg, Fraser Coast	261 km^{2} (101 sq mi)	1960		SEQ	25.046°S 152.463°E	
Byfield	Livingstone	169 km^{2} (65 sq mi)	1989		CMC	22.820°S 150.748°E	
Cania Gorge	North Burnett	30 km^{2} (12 sq mi)	1977		BBS	24.683°S 150.985°E	
Cape Hillsborough	Mackay	11 km^{2} (4.2 sq mi)	1969		CMC	20.912°S 149.028°E	
Cape Melville*	Cook	1,700 km^{2} (660 sq mi)	1973		CYP	14.400°S 144.464°E	
Cape Palmerston	Mackay, Isaac	72 km^{2} (28 sq mi)	1976		CMC	21.591°S 149.428°E	
Cape Upstart	Whitsunday	86 km^{2} (33 sq mi)	1969		BBN	19.749°S 147.804°E	
Capricorn Coast	Livingstone	1.75 km^{2} (0.68 sq mi)	1943		BBN, CMC	23.286°S 150.808°E	
Capricornia Cays	Gladstone	1.80 km^{2} (0.69 sq mi)	1960	Great Barrier Reef	SEQ	23.296°S 151.708°E	
Capricornia Cays^	Gladstone	0.44 km^{2} (0.17 sq mi)	1937	Great Barrier Reef	SEQ	23.856°S 152.375°E	
Carnarvon	Central Highlands, Maranoa, Murweh	2,980 km^{2} (1,150 sq mi)	1932		BBS	25.036°S 148.086°E	
Castle Tower	Gladstone	83 km^{2} (32 sq mi)	1975		BBS, SEQ	24.178°S 151.327°E	
Cherbourg	South Burnett	9.95 km^{2} (3.84 sq mi)	2006		SEQ	26.411°S 151.992°E	
Chesterton Range	Murweh, Maranoa	312 km^{2} (120 sq mi)	1992		BBS	26.192°S 147.356°E	
Chillagoe-Mungana Caves	Mareeba	36 km^{2} (14 sq mi)	1940		EIU	17.201°S 144.508°E	
Claremont Isles	Cook	0.63 km^{2} (0.24 sq mi)	1989	Great Barrier Reef	CYP	13.936°S 143.756°E	
Clump Mountain	Cassowary Coast	3.12 km^{2} (1.20 sq mi)	1978	Wet Tropics	WET	17.843°S 146.092°E	
Coalstoun Lakes	North Burnett	0.26 km^{2} (0.10 sq mi)	1929		SEQ	25.597°S 151.910°E	
Conondale	Sunshine Coast, Somerset, Gympie	358 km^{2} (138 sq mi)	1977		SEQ	26.719°S 152.559°E	
Conway	Whitsunday	327 km^{2} (126 sq mi)	1936		CMC	20.384°S 148.791°E	
Cordalba	Bundaberg	25 km^{2} (9.7 sq mi)	2000		SEQ	25.120°S 152.101°E	
Crater Lakes	Tablelands	9.64 km^{2} (3.72 sq mi)	1934	Wet Tropics	WET	17.251°S 145.638°E	
Crows Nest	Toowoomba	18 km^{2} (6.9 sq mi)	1967		SEQ	27.269°S 152.118°E	
Cudmore	Barcaldine	212 km^{2} (82 sq mi)	1998		DEU	22.941°S 146.294°E	
Culgoa Floodplain	Balonne, Paroo	619 km^{2} (239 sq mi)	1994		DRP, MUL	28.901°S 146.966°E	
Currawinya	Bulloo, Paroo	3,443 km^{2} (1,329 sq mi)	1991		MUL	28.506°S 144.491°E	
Curtain Fig	Tablelands	2.09 km^{2} (0.81 sq mi)	2008	Wet Tropics	WET	17.280°S 145.570°E	In 2025 Yungaburra NP was incorporated into Curtain Fig National Park.
Curtis Island	Gladstone	106 km^{2} (41 sq mi)	1992	Great Barrier Reef	BBN	23.594°S 151.217°E	
D'Aguilar	Brisbane, Moreton Bay, Somerset	391 km^{2} (151 sq mi)	1930		SEQ	27.377°S 152.760°E	
Daarrba*	Cook	4.15 km^{2} (1.60 sq mi)	1973		CYP	15.068°S 145.124°E	
Daintree*	Douglas	1,166 km^{2} (450 sq mi)	1967	Wet Tropics	WET	16.367°S 145.248°E	
Dalrymple	Charters Towers	18 km^{2} (6.9 sq mi)	1990		EIU	19.797°S 146.109°E	
Dan Dan	Gladstone	16 km^{2} (6.2 sq mi)	2001		BBS, SEQ	24.162°S 151.063°E	
Danbulla	Tablelands, Mareeba, Cairns	114 km^{2} (44 sq mi)	2003	Wet Tropics	EIU, WET	17.121°S 145.581°E	
Davies Creek	Mareeba	4.86 km^{2} (1.88 sq mi)	1971		EIU, WET	17.004°S 145.581°E	
Dawes	Gladstone, North Burnett	89 km^{2} (34 sq mi)	2006		BBS, SEQ	24.535°S 151.264°E	
Deepwater	Gladstone	49 km^{2} (19 sq mi)	1979		SEQ	24.338°S 151.940°E	
Deer Reserve	Somerset	32 km^{2} (12 sq mi)	2006		SEQ	27.086°S 152.527°E	
Diamantina	Diamantina	5,070 km^{2} (1,960 sq mi)	1993		CHC, MGD	23.799°S 141.423°E	
Dinden	Mareeba, Cairns	207 km^{2} (80 sq mi)	2005	Wet Tropics	WET	16.995°S 145.639°E	
Dipperu^	Isaac	111 km^{2} (43 sq mi)	1980		BBN	21.948°S 148.720°E	
Djiru	Cassowary Coast	41 km^{2} (16 sq mi)	2009	Wet Tropics	WET	17.892°S 146.063°E	
Dryander	Whitsunday	132 km^{2} (51 sq mi)	1989		CMC	20.233°S 148.583°E	
Dularcha	Sunshine Coast	4.71 km^{2} (1.82 sq mi)	1921		SEQ	26.786°S 152.956°E	
Ella Bay	Cassowary Coast, Cairns	37 km^{2} (14 sq mi)	1978	Wet Tropics	WET	17.432°S 146.040°E	
Endeavour River	Cook	0.09 km^{2} (0.035 sq mi)	1975		CYP	15.436°S 145.218°E	A large portion of the park was used to create Waalmbaal Birri (Endeavour River) National Park as part of the 2026 Cooktown-area land handback.
Epping Forest^	Isaac	28 km^{2} (11 sq mi)	1971		BBN	22.357°S 146.706°E	
Erringibba	Western Downs	8.77 km^{2} (3.39 sq mi)	1990		BBS	27.289°S 149.706°E	
Errk Oykangand*	Carpentaria	382 km^{2} (147 sq mi)	1977		CYP, GUP	15.487°S 142.090°E	
Esk	Somerset	3.77 km^{2} (1.46 sq mi)	2006		SEQ	27.295°S 152.321°E	
Eubenangee Swamp	Cairns	19 km^{2} (7.3 sq mi)	1977		WET	17.424°S 145.962°E	
Eudlo Creek	Sunshine Coast	0.43 km^{2} (0.17 sq mi)	1918		SEQ	26.705°S 152.963°E	
Eungella	Mackay	622 km^{2} (240 sq mi)	1936		BBN, CMC	21.004°S 148.576°E	
Eurimbula	Gladstone	237 km^{2} (92 sq mi)	1977		SEQ	24.203°S 151.729°E	
Expedition	Banana, Maranoa, Central Highlands	1,292 km^{2} (499 sq mi)	1953		BBS	25.275°S 149.048°E	
Fairlies Knob	Fraser Coast	2.99 km^{2} (1.15 sq mi)	1910		SEQ	25.499°S 152.281°E	
Family Islands	Cassowary Coast	6.68 km^{2} (2.58 sq mi)	1936	Great Barrier Reef	WET	17.948°S 146.164°E	
Ferntree Creek	Sunshine Coast	0.73 km^{2} (0.28 sq mi)	1947		SEQ	26.610°S 152.965°E	
Finucane Island	Burke, Carpentaria	77 km^{2} (30 sq mi)	2003		GUP	17.631°S 139.781°E	
Fitzroy Island	Cairns	2.90 km^{2} (1.12 sq mi)	1989	Great Barrier Reef	WET	16.933°S 145.994°E	
Flinders Group*	Cook	28 km^{2} (11 sq mi)	1939	Great Barrier Reef	CYP	14.179°S 144.255°E	
Forest Den	Barcaldine	59 km^{2} (23 sq mi)	1991		DEU	22.120°S 145.220°E	
Fort Lytton	Brisbane	0.13 km^{2} (0.050 sq mi)	1988		SEQ	27.413°S 153.151°E	
Forty Mile Scrub	Mareeba, Tablelands	63 km^{2} (24 sq mi)	1970		EIU	18.097°S 144.856°E	
Frankland Group	Cairns	0.94 km^{2} (0.36 sq mi)	1936	Great Barrier Reef	WET	17.158°S 146.010°E	
Freshwater	Moreton Bay	1.62 km^{2} (0.63 sq mi)	1973		SEQ	27.177°S 152.991°E	
Gadgarra	Tablelands	83 km^{2} (32 sq mi)	2010	Wet Tropics	WET	17.278°S 145.703°E	
Gatton	Lockyer Valley	4.26 km^{2} (1.64 sq mi)	2006		SEQ	27.606°S 152.302°E	
Geham	Toowoomba	0.22 km^{2} (0.085 sq mi)	2006		SEQ	27.388°S 152.038°E	
Gheebulum Kunungai (Moreton Island)	Brisbane	171 km^{2} (66 sq mi)	1966		SEQ	27.241°S 153.415°E	
Girramay	Cassowary Coast	290 km^{2} (110 sq mi)	2007	Wet Tropics	WET	18.159°S 145.840°E	
Girraween	Southern Downs	118 km^{2} (46 sq mi)	1930		NET	28.856°S 151.949°E	
Girringun	Hinchinbrook, Tablelands, Cassowary Coast, Charters Towers	3,007 km^{2} (1,161 sq mi)	1965	Wet Tropics	EIU, WET	18.348°S 145.756°E	
Glass House Mountains	Sunshine Coast, Moreton Bay	30 km^{2} (12 sq mi)	1954		SEQ	26.950°S 152.943°E	
Glastonbury	Gympie	5.31 km^{2} (2.05 sq mi)	2001		SEQ	26.289°S 152.508°E	
Glenbar	Fraser Coast, Gympie	30 km^{2} (12 sq mi)	2006		SEQ	25.838°S 152.344°E	
Gloucester Island	Whitsunday	30 km^{2} (12 sq mi)	1934	Great Barrier Reef	BBN, CMC	20.013°S 148.458°E	
Goneaway	Barcoo	248 km^{2} (96 sq mi)	1995		CHC	23.768°S 142.233°E	
Goodedulla	Rockhampton	255 km^{2} (98 sq mi)	1994		BBS	23.248°S 149.739°E	
Goodnight Scrub	Bundaberg, North Burnett	67 km^{2} (26 sq mi)	1998		SEQ	25.307°S 151.889°E	
Goold Island	Cassowary Coast	8.23 km^{2} (3.18 sq mi)	1936	Great Barrier Reef	WET	18.166°S 146.173°E	
Goomboorian	Gympie	18 km^{2} (6.9 sq mi)	37015		SEQ	26.122°S 152.771°E	
Great Basalt Wall	Charters Towers	352 km^{2} (136 sq mi)	1987		DEU, EIU	20.009°S 145.241°E	
Great Sandy	Fraser Coast, Gympie, Noosa	2,215 km^{2} (855 sq mi)	1971	K'gari (Fraser Island)	SEQ	25.247°S 153.145°E	
Green Island	Cairns	0.08 km^{2} (0.031 sq mi)	1937	Great Barrier Reef	WET	16.760°S 145.974°E	
Grey Peaks	Cairns	33 km^{2} (13 sq mi)	1971	Wet Tropics	WET	16.921°S 145.838°E	
Grongah	Gympie, Fraser Coast	229 km^{2} (88 sq mi)	2007		SEQ	25.923°S 152.139°E	
Gulngay	Cassowary Coast	48 km^{2} (19 sq mi)	2019		WET	18.035°S 146.011°E	
Gympie	Gympie	18 km^{2} (6.9 sq mi)	2006		SEQ	26.055°S 152.709°E	
Halifax Bay Wetlands	Hinchinbrook	18 km^{2} (6.9 sq mi)	1978		WET	18.770°S 146.267°E	
Hampton	Toowoomba	0.04 km^{2} (0.015 sq mi)	2006		SEQ	27.353°S 152.074°E	
Hann Tableland	Mareeba	108 km^{2} (42 sq mi)	1989		EIU	16.875°S 145.221°E	
Hasties Swamp	Tablelands	0.57 km^{2} (0.22 sq mi)	1980		WET	17.299°S 145.476°E	
Hell Hole Gorge	Quilpie	127 km^{2} (49 sq mi)	1992		MUL	25.545°S 144.153°E	
Herberton Range	Tablelands	65 km^{2} (25 sq mi)	2008	Wet Tropics	WET	17.361°S 145.472°E	
Hinchinbrook Island	Cassowary Coast	404 km^{2} (156 sq mi)	1932	Great Barrier Reef	WET	18.371°S 146.214°E	
Holbourne Island	Whitsunday	0.34 km^{2} (0.13 sq mi)	1982	Great Barrier Reef	CMC	19.726°S 148.358°E	
Homevale	Isaac	420 km^{2} (160 sq mi)	1995		BBN, CMC	21.433°S 148.642°E	
Hope Islands*	Cook, Douglas	0.62 km^{2} (0.24 sq mi)	1939	Great Barrier Reef	WET	16.298°S 145.498°E	
Howick Group*	Cook	0.85 km^{2} (0.33 sq mi)	1989	Great Barrier Reef	CYP	14.508°S 144.989°E	
Hull River	Cassowary Coast	37 km^{2} (14 sq mi)	1994	Wet Tropics	WET	17.982°S 146.054°E	
Humboldt	Central Highlands	77 km^{2} (30 sq mi)	2008		BBN, BBS	24.208°S 148.956°E	
Idalia	Quilpie, Blackall-Tambo, Longreach	1,440 km^{2} (560 sq mi)	1990		MGD, MUL	24.954°S 144.682°E	
Isla Gorge	Banana	79 km^{2} (31 sq mi)	1964		BBS	25.141°S 149.930°E	
Japoon	Cassowary Coast	248 km^{2} (96 sq mi)	1992	Wet Tropics	WET	17.778°S 145.895°E	
Junee	Isaac	54 km^{2} (21 sq mi)	2000		BBN	22.756°S 148.993°E	
Juunju Daarrba Nhirrpan*	Cook	80 km^{2} (31 sq mi)	1977		CYP	14.942°S 145.062°E	
Kalkajaka*	Cook	9.03 km^{2} (3.49 sq mi)	1967		CYP, WET	15.666°S 145.234°E	
Keatings Lagoon	Cook	0.46 km^{2} (0.18 sq mi)	2026		CYP	15.506°S 145.227°E	Converted from conservation park to national park in June 2026.
Kelvin	Mackay	26 km^{2} (10 sq mi)	2009		CMC	21.587°S 149.185°E	
Keppel Bay Islands	Livingstone, Gladstone	8.27 km^{2} (3.19 sq mi)	1940	Great Barrier Reef	BBN, CMC	23.070°S 150.895°E	
Keppel Bay Islands^	Livingstone	1.04 km^{2} (0.40 sq mi)	1940	Great Barrier Reef	BBN, CMC	23.159°S 151.075°E	
Kinrara	Tablelands	76 km^{2} (29 sq mi)	2003		EIU	18.455°S 144.951°E	
Kirrama	Tablelands, Cassowary Coast	176 km^{2} (68 sq mi)	2005	Wet Tropics	WET	18.165°S 145.721°E	
Kondalilla	Sunshine Coast	16 km^{2} (6.2 sq mi)	1945		SEQ	26.682°S 152.834°E	
Koombooloomba	Tablelands, Cassowary Coast	293 km^{2} (113 sq mi)	2010	Wet Tropics	WET	17.968°S 145.603°E	
Kroombit Tops	Gladstone, Banana, North Burnett	433 km^{2} (167 sq mi)	1974		BBS, SEQ	24.424°S 150.943°E	
KULLA (McIlwraith Range)*	Cook	1,584 km^{2} (612 sq mi)	2008		CYP	13.901°S 143.342°E	
Kuranda	Mareeba, Cairns	274 km^{2} (106 sq mi)	2005	Wet Tropics	EIU, WET	16.688°S 145.425°E	
Kurrimine Beach	Cassowary Coast	9.10 km^{2} (3.51 sq mi)	1977	Wet Tropics	WET	17.731°S 146.097°E	
Kutini-Payamu (Iron Range)*	Cook	532 km^{2} (205 sq mi)	1981		CYP	12.633°S 143.279°E	
Lake Bindegolly	Bulloo	125 km^{2} (48 sq mi)	1991		MUL	28.011°S 144.197°E	
Lama Lama*	Cook	356 km^{2} (137 sq mi)	2008		CYP	14.426°S 143.746°E	
Lamington	Scenic Rim, Gold Coast	214 km^{2} (83 sq mi)	1915	Gondwana Rainforests	SEQ	28.244°S 153.157°E	
Lindeman Islands	Mackay	29 km^{2} (11 sq mi)	1936	Great Barrier Reef	CMC	20.481°S 149.086°E	
Littabella	Bundaberg, Gladstone	83 km^{2} (32 sq mi)	1980		SEQ	24.708°S 151.965°E	
Little Mulgrave	Cairns	109 km^{2} (42 sq mi)	2010	Wet Tropics	WET	17.104°S 145.703°E	
Littleton	Etheridge, Croydon	794 km^{2} (307 sq mi)	2015		EIU, GUP	18.345°S 142.661°E	
Lizard Island	Cook	9.91 km^{2} (3.83 sq mi)	1939	Great Barrier Reef	CYP	14.665°S 145.460°E	
Lochern	Longreach	249 km^{2} (96 sq mi)	1994		CHC, MGD	24.057°S 143.290°E	
Lockyer	Lockyer Valley	113 km^{2} (44 sq mi)	2008		SEQ	27.463°S 152.257°E	
Ma'alpiku Island*	Cook	0.26 km^{2} (0.10 sq mi)	1989	Great Barrier Reef	CYP	12.616°S 143.448°E	
Maalan	Tablelands	25 km^{2} (9.7 sq mi)	2005	Wet Tropics	WET	17.560°S 145.556°E	
Macalister Range	Douglas, Cairns	56 km^{2} (22 sq mi)	2010	Wet Tropics	WET	16.651°S 145.525°E	
Magnetic Island	Townsville	39 km^{2} (15 sq mi)	1954	Great Barrier Reef	BBN	19.139°S 146.832°E	
Main Range	Southern Downs, Scenic Rim, Lockyer Valley	383 km^{2} (148 sq mi)	1909	Gondwana Rainforests	BBS, SEQ	28.189°S 152.433°E	
Malbon Thompson Range	Cairns	6.2 km^{2} (2.4 sq mi)	2024			17.1944°S 145.9564°E	
Maleny	Sunshine Coast	19 km^{2} (7.3 sq mi)	2006		SEQ	26.663°S 152.716°E	
Mapleton	Sunshine Coast	101 km^{2} (39 sq mi)	2011		SEQ	26.573°S 152.816°E	
Mapleton Falls	Sunshine Coast	0.26 km^{2} (0.10 sq mi)	1973		SEQ	26.629°S 152.840°E	
Maria Creek	Cassowary Coast	7.46 km^{2} (2.88 sq mi)	1976		WET	17.778°S 146.070°E	
Mariala	Quilpie	273 km^{2} (105 sq mi)	1992		MUL	26.062°S 145.041°E	
Marpa*	Cook	0.38 km^{2} (0.15 sq mi)	1989	Great Barrier Reef	CYP	14.218°S 143.776°E	
Mazeppa	Isaac	41 km^{2} (16 sq mi)	1972		BBN	22.229°S 147.288°E	
Melsonby (Gaarraay)*	Cook	86 km^{2} (33 sq mi)	2006		CYP	15.203°S 144.856°E	
Miara	Bundaberg	18.06 km^{2} (6.97 sq mi)	2026		SEQ	24.650°S 152.200°E	Established in 2026 to protect land in the Miara–Yandaran area north of the Kolan River.
Michaelmas and Upolu Cays	Douglas	0.03 km^{2} (0.012 sq mi)	1975	Great Barrier Reef	WET	16.607°S 145.974°E	
Millstream Falls	Tablelands	3.69 km^{2} (1.42 sq mi)	1909		WET	17.635°S 145.466°E	
Minerva Hills	Central Highlands	28 km^{2} (11 sq mi)	1978		BBN	24.077°S 148.057°E	
Mitirinchi Island*	Cook	0.01 km^{2} (0.0039 sq mi)	1989	Great Barrier Reef	CYP	12.404°S 143.489°E	
Molle Islands	Whitsunday	18 km^{2} (6.9 sq mi)	1980	Great Barrier Reef	CMC	20.372°S 148.861°E	
Moogerah Peaks	Scenic Rim	9.27 km^{2} (3.58 sq mi)	1948		SEQ	28.022°S 152.544°E	
Mooloolah River	Sunshine Coast	17 km^{2} (6.6 sq mi)	1960		SEQ	26.723°S 153.096°E	
Moorrinya	Flinders	326 km^{2} (126 sq mi)	1993		DEU	21.400°S 144.956°E	
Moresby Range	Cassowary Coast	6.32 km^{2} (2.44 sq mi)	1972	Wet Tropics	WET	17.534°S 146.077°E	
Mount Abbot^	Whitsunday	14 km^{2} (5.4 sq mi)	2010		BBN	20.116°S 147.717°E	
Mount Aberdeen	Whitsunday	30 km^{2} (12 sq mi)	1952		BBN	20.200°S 147.930°E	
Mount Archer	Rockhampton, Livingstone	43 km^{2} (17 sq mi)	1994		BBN	23.331°S 150.591°E	
Mount Barney	Scenic Rim	183 km^{2} (71 sq mi)	1947	Gondwana Rainforests	SEQ	28.285°S 152.676°E	
Mount Bauple^	Fraser Coast	5.47 km^{2} (2.11 sq mi)	1977		SEQ	25.811°S 152.577°E	
Mount Binga	Toowoomba	11 km^{2} (4.2 sq mi)	2006		SEQ	27.036°S 151.948°E	
Mount Chinghee	Scenic Rim	13 km^{2} (5.0 sq mi)	1994	Gondwana Rainforests	SEQ	28.303°S 152.947°E	
Mount Colosseum	Gladstone	8.40 km^{2} (3.24 sq mi)	1994		SEQ	24.407°S 151.589°E	
Mount Coolum	Sunshine Coast	3.60 km^{2} (1.39 sq mi)	1990		SEQ	26.585°S 153.087°E	
Mount Etna Caves	Livingstone	5.81 km^{2} (2.24 sq mi)	1975		BBN	23.160°S 150.474°E	
Mount Hypipamee	Tablelands	3.64 km^{2} (1.41 sq mi)	1939	Wet Tropics	WET	17.424°S 145.488°E	
Mount Lewis	Mareeba, Douglas	279 km^{2} (108 sq mi)	2009	Wet Tropics	EIU, WET	16.515°S 145.271°E	
Mount Mackay	Cassowary Coast	37 km^{2} (14 sq mi)	2005	Wet Tropics	WET	17.943°S 145.974°E	
Mount Martin	Mackay	22 km^{2} (8.5 sq mi)	1994		CMC	21.092°S 148.897°E	
Mount O'Connell	Livingstone	7.57 km^{2} (2.92 sq mi)	1989		BBN	22.747°S 150.042°E	
Mount Ossa	Mackay	8.71 km^{2} (3.36 sq mi)	1994		CMC	20.975°S 148.823°E	
Mount Pinbarren	Noosa	0.23 km^{2} (0.089 sq mi)	1929		SEQ	26.318°S 152.855°E	
Mount Spurgeon	Mareeba	12 km^{2} (4.6 sq mi)	2008	Wet Tropics	WET	16.435°S 145.205°E	
Mount Walsh	North Burnett, Fraser Coast	141 km^{2} (54 sq mi)	1947		SEQ	25.624°S 152.063°E	
Mount Windsor	Cook, Douglas, Mareeba	482 km^{2} (186 sq mi)	2005	Wet Tropics	EIU, WET	16.248°S 145.004°E	
Mowbray	Douglas, Mareeba	87 km^{2} (34 sq mi)	1998	Wet Tropics	WET	16.606°S 145.452°E	
Mudlo	Gympie	22 km^{2} (8.5 sq mi)	2007		SEQ	26.026°S 152.211°E	
Munga-Thirri	Diamantina	10,120 km^{2} (3,910 sq mi)	1967		SSD	25.568°S 138.354°E	
Muundhi (Jack River)*	Cook	1,648 km^{2} (636 sq mi)	2005		CYP	14.883°S 144.588°E	
Nairana	Isaac	194 km^{2} (75 sq mi)	2003		BBN	21.693°S 146.909°E	
Nangur	Gympie	18 km^{2} (6.9 sq mi)	2006		SEQ	26.120°S 151.984°E	
Naree Budjong Djara	Redland	132 km^{2} (51 sq mi)	1962		SEQ	27.671°S 153.447°E	
Narkoola	Balonne	140 km^{2} (54 sq mi)	2010		MUL	28.061°S 147.080°E	
Narrien Range	Isaac	75 km^{2} (29 sq mi)	1991		BBN	22.910°S 146.967°E	
Nerang	Gold Coast	17 km^{2} (6.6 sq mi)	2009		SEQ	27.968°S 153.298°E	
Newry Islands	Mackay	4.64 km^{2} (1.79 sq mi)	1938	Great Barrier Reef	CMC	20.842°S 148.903°E	
Ngalba Bulal*	Cook, Douglas	425 km^{2} (164 sq mi)	1989	Wet Tropics	CYP, EIU, WET	15.915°S 145.175°E	
Ngaynggarr*	Cook	165 km^{2} (64 sq mi)	2016		CYP	15.148°S 144.740°E	
Nicoll Scrub	Gold Coast	0.27 km^{2} (0.10 sq mi)	1986		SEQ	28.188°S 153.424°E	
Noosa	Noosa, Sunshine Coast	29 km^{2} (11 sq mi)	1939		SEQ	26.441°S 153.092°E	
Northumberland Islands	Isaac, Mackay	17 km^{2} (6.6 sq mi)	1937	Great Barrier Reef	CMC	21.602°S 149.800°E	
Nour Nour	North Burnett	51 km^{2} (20 sq mi)	2007		SEQ	25.299°S 151.427°E	
Nuga Nuga	Central Highlands	29 km^{2} (11 sq mi)	1991		BBS	24.963°S 148.688°E	
Oakview	Gympie	42 km^{2} (16 sq mi)	2009		SEQ	26.147°S 152.347°E	
Olkola*	Cook, Carpentaria	3,732 km^{2} (1,441 sq mi)	2014		CYP	15.557°S 143.118°E	
Orpheus Island	Hinchinbrook	13 km^{2} (5.0 sq mi)	1960	Great Barrier Reef	WET	18.614°S 146.494°E	
Oyala Thumotang*	Cook	3,816 km^{2} (1,473 sq mi)	1977		CYP	13.578°S 142.799°E	
Palmerston Rocks	Cassowary Coast	0.10 km^{2} (0.039 sq mi)	1977		WET	17.568°S 145.899°E	
Palmgrove^	Central Highlands	256 km^{2} (99 sq mi)	1991		BBS	24.991°S 149.270°E	
Paluma Range	Townsville, Charters Towers, Hinchinbrook	790 km^{2} (310 sq mi)	1952	Wet Tropics	BBN, EIU, WET	19.106°S 146.308°E	
Peak Range	Isaac, Central Highlands	25 km^{2} (9.7 sq mi)	1983		BBN	22.479°S 147.879°E	
Percy Isles	Isaac	35 km^{2} (14 sq mi)	1938	Great Barrier Reef	CMC	21.651°S 150.272°E	
Pidna	Toowoomba	1.60 km^{2} (0.62 sq mi)	2006		SEQ	26.894°S 151.974°E	
Pinnacles	Townsville	57 km^{2} (22 sq mi)	2011		BBN, EIU	19.427°S 146.571°E	
Pioneer Peaks	Mackay	19 km^{2} (7.3 sq mi)	1980		CMC	21.028°S 148.939°E	
Pipeclay	Gympie	0.15 km^{2} (0.058 sq mi)	1974		SEQ	25.984°S 153.006°E	
Piper Islands*	Cook	0.06 km^{2} (0.023 sq mi)	1989	Great Barrier Reef	CYP	12.244°S 143.227°E	
Poona	Fraser Coast	54 km^{2} (21 sq mi)	1991		SEQ	25.589°S 152.821°E	
Porcupine Gorge	Flinders	53 km^{2} (20 sq mi)	1970		EIU	20.360°S 144.456°E	
Possession Island	Torres	5.08 km^{2} (1.96 sq mi)	1977		CYP	10.724°S 142.397°E	
Precipice	Banana	104 km^{2} (40 sq mi)	1989		BBS	25.307°S 150.101°E	
Pumicestone	Sunshine Coast, Moreton Bay	11 km^{2} (4.2 sq mi)	2010		SEQ	26.993°S 153.061°E	
Raine Island^	Cook	0.40 km^{2} (0.15 sq mi)	1985	Great Barrier Reef		11.590°S 144.035°E	
Ravensbourne	Toowoomba, Somerset	6.87 km^{2} (2.65 sq mi)	1922		SEQ	27.356°S 152.197°E	
Reliance Creek	Mackay	0.30 km^{2} (0.12 sq mi)	1980		CMC	21.046°S 149.111°E	
Repulse Islands	Whitsunday	1.48 km^{2} (0.57 sq mi)	1994	Great Barrier Reef	CMC	20.598°S 148.880°E	
Rinyirru (Lakefield)*	Cook	5,440 km^{2} (2,100 sq mi)	1979		CYP	15.012°S 144.020°E	
Rundle Range	Gladstone	22 km^{2} (8.5 sq mi)	1990		BBN	23.646°S 150.974°E	
Rungulla	Etheridge	1,201 km^{2} (464 sq mi)	2015		EIU, GUP	19.136°S 143.419°E	
Russell River	Cairns	54 km^{2} (21 sq mi)	1969	Wet Tropics	WET	17.281°S 145.978°E	
Sandbanks	Cook	0.08 km^{2} (0.031 sq mi)	1989	Great Barrier Reef	CYP	13.438°S 143.972°E	
Sarabah	Scenic Rim	0.01 km^{2} (0.0039 sq mi)	1973		SEQ	28.047°S 153.123°E	
Smith Islands	Mackay	12 km^{2} (4.6 sq mi)	1936	Great Barrier Reef	CMC	20.681°S 149.151°E	
Snake Range	Central Highlands	27 km^{2} (10 sq mi)	1972		BBN	24.039°S 147.583°E	
South Cumberland Islands	Mackay	32 km^{2} (12 sq mi)	1938	Great Barrier Reef	CMC	20.866°S 149.616°E	
Southern Moreton Bay Islands	Gold Coast	16 km^{2} (6.2 sq mi)	1998		SEQ	27.800°S 153.395°E	
Southwood	Western Downs	71 km^{2} (27 sq mi)	1970		BBS	27.813°S 150.138°E	
Springbrook	Gold Coast	67 km^{2} (26 sq mi)	1937	Gondwana Rainforests	SEQ	28.199°S 153.288°E	
Squirrel Creek National Park	Somerset	64.61 km^{2} (24.95 sq mi)	2024		SEQ	26.6922°S 152.3289°E	
St Helena Island	Brisbane	0.75 km^{2} (0.29 sq mi)	1979		SEQ	27.389°S 153.233°E	
Staaten River	Mareeba, Carpentaria	4,700 km^{2} (1,800 sq mi)	1977		GUP	16.600°S 142.736°E	
Sundown	Southern Downs	126 km^{2} (49 sq mi)	1977		NAN, NET	28.853°S 151.720°E	
Swain Reefs	Isaac, Livingstone, Mackay	0.58 km^{2} (0.22 sq mi)	1995	Great Barrier Reef		21.790°S 152.451°E	
Tamborine	Scenic Rim, Gold Coast	21 km^{2} (8.1 sq mi)	1908		SEQ	27.884°S 153.185°E	
Tarong	South Burnett	15 km^{2} (5.8 sq mi)	1995		SEQ	26.837°S 151.846°E	
Taunton^	Central Highlands	116 km^{2} (45 sq mi)	1994		BBN, BBS	23.539°S 149.217°E	
Teerk Roo Ra	Redland	4.60 km^{2} (1.78 sq mi)	2007		SEQ	27.500°S 153.351°E	
Tewantin	Noosa	42 km^{2} (16 sq mi)	2010		SEQ	26.387°S 152.988°E	
The Lakes National Park	Flinders	430 sq mi (1,100 km^{2})	2024			19.8764°S 144.2792°E	
The Palms	Toowoomba	0.73 km^{2} (0.28 sq mi)	1950		SEQ	26.926°S 151.888°E	
Three Islands Group	Cook	0.75 km^{2} (0.29 sq mi)	1939	Great Barrier Reef	CYP	15.115°S 145.426°E	
Thrushton	Balonne, Maranoa	257 km^{2} (99 sq mi)	1990		MUL	27.787°S 147.681°E	
Topaz Road	Tablelands	0.38 km^{2} (0.15 sq mi)	1977		WET	17.399°S 145.701°E	
Tregole	Murweh	76 km^{2} (29 sq mi)	1995		BBS, MUL	26.483°S 147.069°E	
Triunia	Sunshine Coast	0.34 km^{2} (0.13 sq mi)	1994		SEQ	26.653°S 152.903°E	
Tuchekoi	Noosa	3.84 km^{2} (1.48 sq mi)	2009		SEQ	26.369°S 152.840°E	
Tully Falls	Tablelands, Cassowary Coast	171 km^{2} (66 sq mi)	2006	Wet Tropics	WET	17.670°S 145.592°E	
Tully Gorge	Cassowary Coast, Tablelands	602 km^{2} (232 sq mi)	1963	Wet Tropics	WET	17.827°S 145.853°E	
Turtle Group	Cook	1.05 km^{2} (0.41 sq mi)	1939	Great Barrier Reef	CYP	14.655°S 145.252°E	
Undara Volcanic	Etheridge, Mareeba	683 km^{2} (264 sq mi)	1989		EIU	18.310°S 144.614°E	
Venman Bushland	Redland	4.15 km^{2} (1.60 sq mi)	1994		SEQ	27.634°S 153.199°E	
Waalmbaal Birri (Endeavour River)*	Cook	21.58 km^{2} (8.33 sq mi)	2026		CYP	15.442°S 145.218°E	The park was created as part of the 2026 Cooktown-area land handback.
Warro	Gladstone	60 km^{2} (23 sq mi)	2006		SEQ	24.648°S 151.716°E	
Waymbuurr (Mount Cook)*	Cook	7.16 km^{2} (2.76 sq mi)	1970		CYP	15.491°S 145.259°E	The park was redesignated as Waymbuurr (Mount Cook) National Park in 2026.
Welford	Barcoo, Longreach	1,240 km^{2} (480 sq mi)	1994		CHC, MGD, MUL	24.967°S 143.481°E	
West Hill	Isaac	11 km^{2} (4.2 sq mi)	1938	Great Barrier Reef	CMC	21.852°S 149.461°E	
White Mountains	Charters Towers, Flinders	1,122 km^{2} (433 sq mi)	1990		DEU, EIU	20.514°S 145.003°E	
Whitsunday Islands	Whitsunday	170 km^{2} (66 sq mi)	1936	Great Barrier Reef	CMC	20.253°S 148.988°E	
Wickham	Logan	1.45 km^{2} (0.56 sq mi)	2009		SEQ	27.831°S 153.160°E	
Wietalaba	Gladstone	18 km^{2} (6.9 sq mi)	2014		BBS, SEQ	24.295°S 151.209°E	
Wild Cattle Island	Gladstone	5.80 km^{2} (2.24 sq mi)	1992	Great Barrier Reef	SEQ	23.974°S 151.406°E	
Wiliyan-ngurru	Mount Isa	138 km^{2} (53 sq mi)	1988		MGD, MII	20.018°S 138.184°E	
Wondul Range	Goondiwindi, Toowoomba	147 km^{2} (57 sq mi)	1992		BBS	28.256°S 150.992°E	
Wongi	Fraser Coast, South Burnett	109 km^{2} (42 sq mi)	2006		SEQ	25.506°S 152.245°E	
Woocoo	Fraser Coast	2.43 km^{2} (0.94 sq mi)	2006		SEQ	25.638°S 152.329°E	
Woondum	Gympie, Noosa	40 km^{2} (15 sq mi)	2009		SEQ	26.278°S 152.815°E	
Wooroonooran	Cairns, Cassowary Coast, Tablelands	1,149 km^{2} (444 sq mi)	1921	Wet Tropics	WET	17.362°S 145.805°E	
Woowoonga	North Burnett	27 km^{2} (10 sq mi)	2006		SEQ	25.456°S 152.120°E	
Woroon	South Burnett	5.53 km^{2} (2.14 sq mi)	2006		SEQ	26.070°S 151.765°E	
Wrattens	Gympie, Somerset	217 km^{2} (84 sq mi)	2009		SEQ	26.316°S 152.334°E	
Wuthara Island*	Cook	1.10 km^{2} (0.42 sq mi)	1990	Great Barrier Reef	CYP	12.288°S 143.411°E	
Wuthathi (Captain Billy Landing)*	Cook	105.61 km^{2} (40.78 sq mi)	2025	Great Barrier Reef	CYP	11.623°S 143.625°E	
Wuthathi (Saunders Islands)*	Cook	0.61 km^{2} (0.24 sq mi)	1989	Great Barrier Reef	CYP	11.769°S 143.093°E	
Wuthathi (Shelburne Bay)*	Cook	373 km^{2} (144 sq mi)	2016		CYP	11.984°S 143.007°E	
Wuthathi (Sir Charles Hardy Group)*	Cook	1.32 km^{2} (0.51 sq mi)	1989	Great Barrier Reef	CYP	11.918°S 143.481°E	
Yamarrinh Wachangan Islands (Denham Group)*	Cook	0.70 km^{2} (0.27 sq mi)	1989		CYP	11.170°S 143.016°E	
Yungaburra	Tablelands	0.05 km^{2} (0.019 sq mi)	1953		WET	17.288°S 145.571°E	In 2025 its separate statutory entry was removed and its land incorporated into Curtain Fig National Park.
Yuwi Paree Toolkoon	Mackay	0.34 km^{2} (0.13 sq mi)	1998	Great Barrier Reef	CMC	21.173°S 149.266°E	

=== Resources Reserves ===
- Abbott Bay
- Amamoor Forest
- Bouldercombe Gorge
- Cooloola (Noosa River)
- Flat Top Range
- Heathlands
- Iron Range (Lockhart River)
- Jardine River
- Kennedy Road Gravel
- Lawn Hill (Arthur Creek)
- Lawn Hill (Creek)
- Lawn Hill (Gorge Mouth)
- Lawn Hill (Gregory River Base)
- Lawn Hill (Gregory)
- Lawn Hill (Lilydale)
- Lawn Hill (Littles Range)
- Lawn Hill (Stockyard Creek)
- Lawn Hill (Widdallion)
- Littleton
- Moonstone Hill
- Morgan Park
- Mount Rosey
- Munburra
- Palmer Goldfield
- Stones Country
- Sundown
- Wrattens

=== Scientific Areas ===
- Bald Mountain
- Helidon Hills
- Melaleuca
- Mynea Creek
- Nerang
- Northbrook
- Palgrave
- Saltwater Creek
- Stoney Range
- The Lagoons
- Unnamed (29 different areas)
- Wordoon

== List of marine protected areas ==
Marine protected areas within the Queensland jurisdiction consist of fish habitat areas declared under the Fisheries Act 1994 and marine parks declared under the Marine Parks Act 2004.

=== Fish habitat areas ===
Fish habitat areas are listed in two lists - 'A' and 'B'.

==== List 'A' ====
- Annan River
- Baffle Creek
- Beelbi
- Bowling Green Bay
- Broad Sound
- Burrum
- Cape Palmerston - Rocky Dam
- Cawarral Creek
- Cleveland Bay
- Colosseum Inlet
- Corio Bay
- Dallachy Creek
- Deception Bay
- Edgecumbe Bay
- Eight Mile Creek
- Elliott River
- Escape River
- Eurimbula
- Fitzroy River
- Hay's Inlet
- Hinchinbrook
- Hull River
- Jumpinpin-Broadwater
- Kauri Creek
- Kinkuna
- Kippa-Ring
- Maaroom
- Margaret Bay "Wuthathi
- Maroochy River
- Meunga Creek
- Moreton Banks
- Morning Inlet - Bynoe River
- Murray River
- Myora - Amity Banks
- Nassau River
- Noosa River
- Peel Island
- Pine River Bay
- Princess Charlotte Bay
- Pumicestone Channel
- Repulse
- Rodds Harbour
- Sand Bay
- Seventeen Seventy-Round Hill
- Silver Plains
- Staaten-Gilbert
- Starcke River (Ngulun)
- Susan River
- Temple Bay
- Tin Can Inlet
- Trinity Inlet
- Tully River
- West Hill
- Wreck Creek

==== List 'B' ====
- Annan River
- Barr Creek
- Bassett Basin
- Beelbi
- Bohle River
- Burdekin
- Burrum
- Cape Palmerston - Rocky Dam
- Cattle-Palm Creek
- Colosseum Inlet
- Coombabah
- Coomera
- Currumbin Creek
- Deception Bay
- Edgecumbe Bay
- Fraser Island
- Half Moon Creek
- Halifax
- Kolan River
- Margaret Bay "Wuthathi"
- Maroochy River
- Midge
- Noosa River
- Pimpama
- Pine River Bay
- Pumicestone Channel
- Rodds Harbour
- Seventeen Seventy-Round Hill
- Starcke River (Ngulun)
- Tallebudgera Creek
- Trinity Inlet
- West Hill
- Yorkeys Creek

=== Marine parks ===
The Queensland jurisdiction only included the following three marine parks as of 2016; the Great Barrier Reef Marine Park is located within the Australian government's jurisdiction.

- Great Barrier Reef Coast Marine Park
- Great Sandy Marine Park
- Moreton Bay Marine Park

== See also ==
- Protected areas of Australia
