= O'Connell =

O'Connell may refer to:

== People ==
- O'Connell (name), people with O'Connell as a last name or given name

== Schools ==
- Bishop Denis J. O'Connell High School, a high school in Arlington, Virginia

== Places ==
- Mount O'Connell National Park in Queensland, Australia
- O'Connell Bridge across the river Liffey in Dublin
- O'Connell Street, main street in Dublin, Ireland
- Stephen C. O'Connell Center, indoor arena at the University of Florida
- O'Connell, New South Wales

== See also ==
- Connell (disambiguation)
- Connelly (disambiguation)
- Justice O'Connell (disambiguation)
