= Olive River =

River in Queensland, Australia

Olive
- Location of Olive River mouth in Queensland

Location
- Country: Australia
- State: Queensland
- Region: Far North Queensland, Cape York Peninsula

Physical characteristics
- Source: Richardson Range, Great Dividing Range
  - location: in remote country
  - coordinates: 12°07′53″S 142°46′41″E
  - elevation: 55 m (180 ft)
- Mouth: Temple Bay, Coral Sea
  - location: north of Lockhart River
  - coordinates: 12°10′12″S 143°05′49″E
  - elevation: 0 m (0 ft)
- Length: 70 km (43 mi)
- Basin size: 2,056 km^{2} (794 sq mi) to 1,701.6 km^{2} (657.0 sq mi)
- Discharge
  - location: Near mouth
  - average: 44.7 m^{3}/s (1,410 GL/a)

The Olive River is a river in the Cape York Peninsula of Far North Queensland, Australia.

The headwaters of the river rise in the Richardson Range, part of the Great Dividing Range, on the Cape York Peninsula. The river initially flows south-easterly and then veers north east and continues across the mostly uninhabited coastal plain and then white sand dunes eventually discharging into Temple Bay and the Coral Sea, north of Lockhart River. The river descends 55 metres (180 ft) over its 70-kilometre (43 mi) course.

The river has a catchment area of 2,056 square kilometres (794 sq mi) of which an area of 43 square kilometres (17 sq mi) is composed of estuarine wetlands.

The traditional owners of the area are the Wuthahti and Kuuku Ya’u peoples, who maintain strong spiritual connections with their country. In 2009 the Federal Court granted native title rights over 1,980 square kilometres (760 sq mi) of land and waters north of the town of Lockhart River and north to the mouth of the Olive River, inclusive of part of the Wuthara Island National Park, the Mitirinchi Island National Park and the Piper Islands National Park. The area was visited by HMQS Paluma as part of a hydrographic survey conducted by the Admiralty in 1893 it is thought to either have been named after a mayor of Cooktown or the characteristic tea-coloured water in the river.

The riparian vegetation are home to many species only found on Cape York Peninsula including the threatened cycad plant, Cycas silvestris.

== See also ==
- List of rivers of Australia § Queensland
