= Goodenia splendida =

Scientific classification
- Kingdom: Plantae
- Clade: Tracheophytes
- Clade: Angiosperms
- Clade: Eudicots
- Clade: Asterids
- Order: Asterales
- Family: Goodeniaceae
- Genus: Goodenia
- Species: G. splendida

Binomial name
- Goodenia splendida A.E.Holland & T.P.Boyle

Species of plant

Goodenia splendida is a species of flowering plant in the family Goodeniaceae and is endemic to Queensland. It is an erect perennial herb with lance-shaped leaves mostly at the base of the plant, and racemes or thyrses of blue or purple flowers.

== Description ==
Goodenia splendida is an erect, perennial herb that typically grows to a height of about 50 cm (20 in) and has sticky foliage. The leaves are arranged at the base of the plant and are lance-shaped, 40–150 mm (1.6–5.9 in) long and 5–20 mm (0.20–0.79 in) wide on a petiole up to 30 mm (1.2 in) long. The flowers are arranged in racemes or thyrses up to 250 mm (9.8 in) long on a peduncle 5–25 mm (0.20–0.98 in) long with linear to lance-shaped bracts 10–30 mm (0.39–1.18 in) long and smaller bracteoles. Each flower is on a pedicel 3–8 mm (0.12–0.31 in) long, the sepals linear to lance-shaped with lobes 3–6 mm (0.12–0.24 in) long. The petals are blue or purple, hairy and 12–20 mm (0.47–0.79 in) long, the lower lobes 3.5–7 mm (0.14–0.28 in) long with wings 1.5–2 mm (0.059–0.079 in) wide. Flowering mainly occurs from March to October and the fruit is an elliptic capsule 8–11 mm (0.31–0.43 in) long and 3–4 mm (0.12–0.16 in) wide.

== Taxonomy and naming ==
Goodenia splendida was first formally described in 2002 by Ailsa E. Holland and T.P. Boyle in the journal Austrobaileya from specimens collected near Yarrowmere Station in 1983. The specific epithet (splendida) refers to the showy foliage and flowers.

== Distribution and habitat ==
This goodenia grows in woodland and shrubland with species of Eucalyptus and Melaleuca between the White Mountains National Park and Lake Buchanan in central eastern Queensland.

== Conservation status ==
Goodenia splendida is listed as of "least concern" under the Queensland Government Nature Conservation Act 1992.
