= Desert Uplands =

- Region
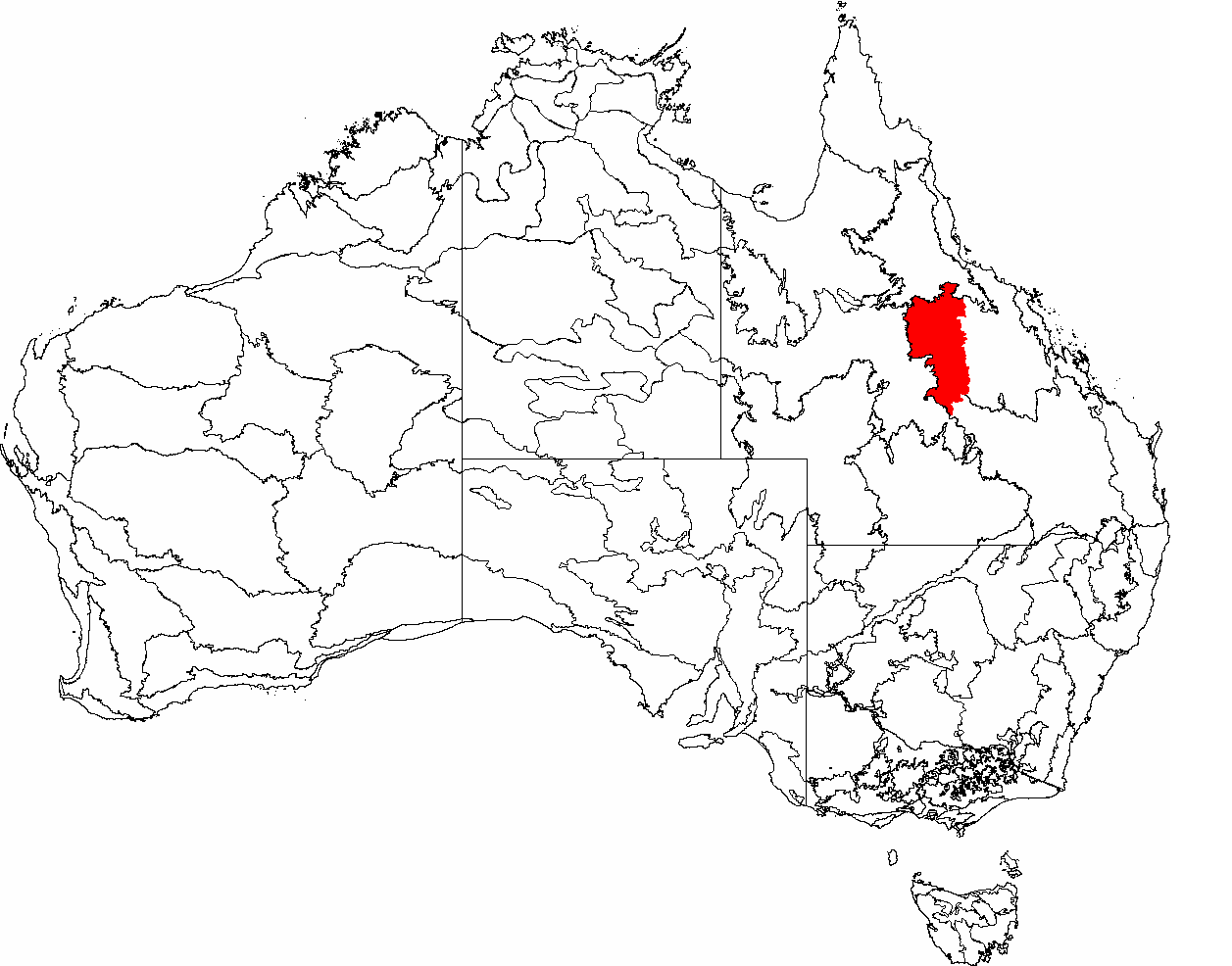
- The interim Australian bioregions, with Desert Uplands in red
- Country: Australia
- State: Queensland

Area
  - Total: 69,410.95 km^{2} (26,799.72 sq mi)
Localities around Desert Uplands
Einasleigh Uplands	Einasleigh Uplands	Einasleigh Uplands
Mitchell Grass Downs	Desert Uplands	Brigalow Belt North
Mitchell Grass Downs	Mitchell Grass Downs	Brigalow Belt South

The Desert Uplands is an interim Australian bioregion located in north and central western Queensland which straddles the Great Dividing Range between Blackall and Pentland.

== Geography ==
The bioregion contains Lake Galilee, Lake Dunn and Lake Buchanan. The climate is semi-arid with highly variable rainfall. Much of the area is used for cattle grazing and is part of the Great Artesian Basin, lying within both the Galilee and Eromanga Basins. The Brigalow Belt North and Brigalow Belt South are to the east of the bioregion, and the Einasleigh Uplands are located to the north.

=== Waterways ===
The main rivers in the bioregion are Belyando, Cape, Campaspe, Barcoo and Alice River and Aramac and Torrens Creeks. Wetlands at shallow salt lakes Lake Galilee and Lake Buchanan are listed on the Directory of Important Wetlands in Australia.

=== Subregions ===
The Desert Uplands bioregion has four subregions:

- Prairie-Torrens Creeks Alluvials (DEU01) – 1,580,384 hectares (3,905,210 acres)
- Alice Tableland (DEU02) – 2,866,760 hectares (7,083,900 acres)
- Cape-Campaspe Plains (DEU03) – 1,007,026 hectares (2,488,420 acres)
- Jericho (DEU04) – 1,486,926 hectares (3,674,270 acres)

== Flora ==
Spinifex grass is common. More than 80 weeds have been identified in the bioregion.

In 2003, it was estimated that 13 million trees per year were being destroyed in the Desert Uplands. This placed the percentage of land cleared at 6.8%, the third highest for any Queensland bioregion.

== Settlements ==
The two main settlements in the area are at Barcaldine and Aramac.

== Protected areas ==
Protected areas in the Desert Uplands bioregion include:

- Cudmore National Park
- Forest Den National Park
- Great Basalt Wall National Park
- Moorrinya National Park
- White Mountains National Park
- Cudmore Resources Reserve
- White Mountains Resources Reserve
- Bellview Nature Refuge
- Bimblebox Nature Refuge
- Bygana West Nature Refuge
- Doongmabulla Mound Springs Nature Refuge
- Edgbaston Nature Refuge
- Strathtay Nature Refuge
- Toomba Nature Refuge
- Ulcanbah Nature Refuge

== See also ==
- Regions of Queensland
