= NQ Dry Tropics =

Australian natural resource management body

NQ Dry Tropics (formerly Burdekin Dry Tropics NRM) is the natural resource management body for the Burdekin Dry Tropics region. Based in Townsville, it is an independent, community based, not-for-profit organisation that has been delivering on-ground Natural Resource Management (NRM) activities since 2005 to enhance the sustainability of the region's natural resources including water, soil and biodiversity.

The economy of the NQ Dry Tropics region is heavily reliant upon natural resources based industries, particularly agriculture. Agriculture is by far the most important employer in the rural areas of the region with well established grazing, sugarcane and horticultural industries. Other major industries include mining, energy and tourism.

== History ==
The National Action Plan for Salinity and Water Quality (NAPSWQ) and the Natural Heritage Trust Extension (NHT2) were natural resource management programs established by the Australian Government, in partnership with State Governments, to address the declining condition of natural resources in Australia. The long term objectives of these programs was to halt and reverse the decline in the condition of the natural resource base. It also recognised that the long term success of Natural resource management activities depended on involvement of sectors of the community.

The election of the Rudd Government saw development of the Caring for our Country program. It was a commitment of $2.25 billion in funding over the first five years commencing 1 July 2008.

=== Goals ===
Land care programs and sustainable farming.

== Geography ==
The NQ Dry Tropics region is located in north eastern Queensland, covering an area of approximately 133,432 km^{2} (51,518 sq mi) and is primarily defined by the catchment area of the Burdekin River plus the associated coastal and marine areas. The region has a population of approximately 240,000 which is mostly concentrated in the major population centres of Townsville, Ayr, Bowen and Charters Towers. Outside of these major centres the region has sparsely populated pastoral properties and mines.

=== Major watercourses ===
Major water courses in this catchment include:

- Basalt River
- Belyando River
- Bogie River
- Bohle River
- Bowen River
- Broken River
- Burdekin River
- Campaspe River
- Cape River
- Clarke River
- Don River
- Dry River
- Fanning River
- Haughton River
- Ross River
- Running River
- Sellheim River
- Star River
- Suttor River

=== Bioregions ===
There are 6 of 15 bioregions (as defined by Interim Biogeographic Regionalisation for Australia) that exist within the Burdekin Dry Tropics NRM region. These are:

- Brigalow Belt North
- Brigalow Belt South
- Central Mackay Coast
- Desert Uplands
- Einasleigh Uplands
- Wet Tropics

== Projects ==
- Landholders Driving Change
- Land Resource Assessment for the Burdekin Dry Tropics region
- Burdekin Water Quality Improvement Plan
