= Pipeclay =

Pipeclay or pipe clay may refer to:

- Catlinite or pipestone, found in Sioux Quartzite deposits in the upper midwestern and southwestern United States, that is used to fashion smoking pipes
- Pipe clay (Australia), also known as white ocre
- Pipeclay triangle, a piece of laboratory equipment used to support a crucible or other object being heated
- Pipeclay National Park in Australia
- White pipe clay, white-firing clay of the sort used to fashion smoking pipes in Europe

== See also ==
- Clay pipe dating, dating clay tobacco pipes found at archaeological sites to specific time periods
