= Mount Aberdeen =

Mount Aberdeen may refer to:

== Australia ==
- a mountain in Mount Aberdeen National Park, Queensland, Australia
- the former name of Mount Buffalo, in Mount Buffalo National Park, Victoria, Australia

== Canada ==
- Mount Aberdeen (Alberta), a mountain in the Canadian Rockies
