= Warro National Park =

National park in Australia

- IUCN category II (national park)
- Location within Queensland
- Location: Queensland
- Nearest city: Gin Gin
- Coordinates: 24°38′49.75″S 151°42′58.84″E
- Area: 60.32 km^{2} (23.29 sq mi)
- Established: 2006

The Warro National Park is a national park in Queensland, Australia with a size of 60 square kilometres (23 sq mi).

== Location ==
The Warro National Park is located in the Wide Bay–Burnett region in the Sunshine Coast about 340 kilometres (210 mi) north of Brisbane and 185 kilometres (115 mi) southeast of Rockhampton. The closest town is Gin Gin. From the city of Gin Gin, the park can be reached via the Bruce Highway in a northerly direction. After about 40 kilometres (25 mi), the highway runs 6 kilometres (3.7 mi) in length parallel to the western national park border. In the south, the national park borders on Lake Monduran. However, there are no visitor facilities.

The national parks of Bania, Bulburin, Littabella and Mount Colosseum are nearby.

== Flora and fauna ==
The national park protects an up to 410 meters high, dry rainforest and an eucalyptus forest.

The park is home to numerous birds, especially the coconut lorikeet (Trichoglossus haematodus moluccanus), the rufous whistler (Pachycephala rufiventris), the grey shrikethrush (Colluricincla harmonica) and the noisy friarbird (Philemon corniculatus). The frogs often include species from Hylidae and Australian common frog families, such as Platyplectrum ornatum. In addition, some endangered plant species are native to the park, such as Argophyllum nullumense, Kunzea flavescens and Eucalyptus decolor.
