= South Island National Park =

National park in Queensland, Australia

- IUCN category II (national park)
- Location within Queensland
- Location: Queensland
- Coordinates: 21°45′09″S 150°19′50″E
- Area: 16.2 km^{2} (6.3 sq mi)
- Established: 1941

South Island is a national park in North Queensland (Australia), 692 km northwest of Brisbane.

== See also ==
- Protected areas of Queensland
