= Anderson Street =

Anderson Street may refer to:

- Anderson Street Conservation Park
- Anderson Street (NJT station)
- Anderson Street Bridge (Hackensack River)
