= Alwal National Park =

National park in Australia

- IUCN category II (national park)
- Location within Queensland
- Location: Queensland
- Nearest city: Laura
- Coordinates: 15°12′12″S 143°34′55″E
- Area: 42.510 km^{2} (16.413 sq mi)
- Established: 2010
- Governing body: Queensland Parks and Wildlife Service
- Website: http://www.nprsr.qld.gov.au/parks/alwal

Alwal National Park is a national park in the Shire of Cook on the Cape York Peninsula in Far North Queensland, Australia.

== Geography ==
Protected within the park is a section of the Morehead River as well as escarpments, undulating low hills, seasonal wetlands and patches of vine-thicket. Alwal lies within the Cape York Peninsula bioregion and contains about 30 separate wetland ecosystems which cover just under 1% of the park. In the east sandstone escarpments and rocky slopes dominate the landscape.

== Fauna ==
Alwal National Park is home to some of last known populations of the Golden-shouldered parrot, one of Australia's most endangered bird species. The park also protects the habitat of the threatened Cape York rock-wallaby, red goshawk and black-necked stork.

== History ==
Alwal National Park was officially opened in May 2010 by acting Minister for Environment Annastacia Palaszczuk. It is named after the Golden-shouldered parrot which has the name Alwal in the Kunjen language.

The traditional owners of the land are the Uw Olkola people. The park is managed under a new model between the state government and Olkola Aboriginal Corporation Land Trust. The property was previously known as Mulkay.

== Facilities ==
There is no vehicle access or visitor facilities.

== See also ==
- Protected areas of Queensland
