= Mount Binga National Park =

National park in Australia

- IUCN category II (national park)
- Location within Queensland
- Location: Queensland
- Nearest city: Cooyar
- Coordinates: 27°2′26″S 151°56′54″E
- Area: 1,066.7 ha (4.119 sq mi)
- Established: 2006
- Governing body: Queensland Parks and Wildlife Service

Mount Binga National Park is a national park at Mount Binga in the Toowoomba Region of the Darling Downs region in southern Queensland, Australia. The park lies within the catchment area of Emu Creek, a tributary of the Brisbane River and belongs to the South East Queensland bioregion.

Mount Binga National Park was established in 2006 to conserve the natural and scenic values of the area. The park was originally part of Mount Binga State Forest which still exists adjacent to the national park.

The landscape is flat with some undulations and contains a wide range of vegetation types. Araucarian vine forest predominate. Five endangered species have been recorded in the park, including the endangered spotted gum. Bird species found at Mount Binga include the black-breasted buttonquail, black-faced monarch, rainbow bee-eater and rufous fantail.

== Facilities ==
There are no visitor facilities.

== See also ==
- Protected areas of Queensland
