= Tarong National Park =

National park in Australia

- IUCN category II (national park)
- Location within Queensland
- Location: Queensland
- Coordinates: 26°48′42″S 151°51′43″E
- Area: 14.90 km^{2} (5.75 sq mi)
- Established: 1995
- Governing body: Queensland Parks and Wildlife Service

Tarong is a national park in Queensland, Australia, 137 km northwest of Brisbane.

== See also ==
- Protected areas of Queensland
