= Mitchell Grass Downs bioregion =

Mitchell Grass Downs Australia
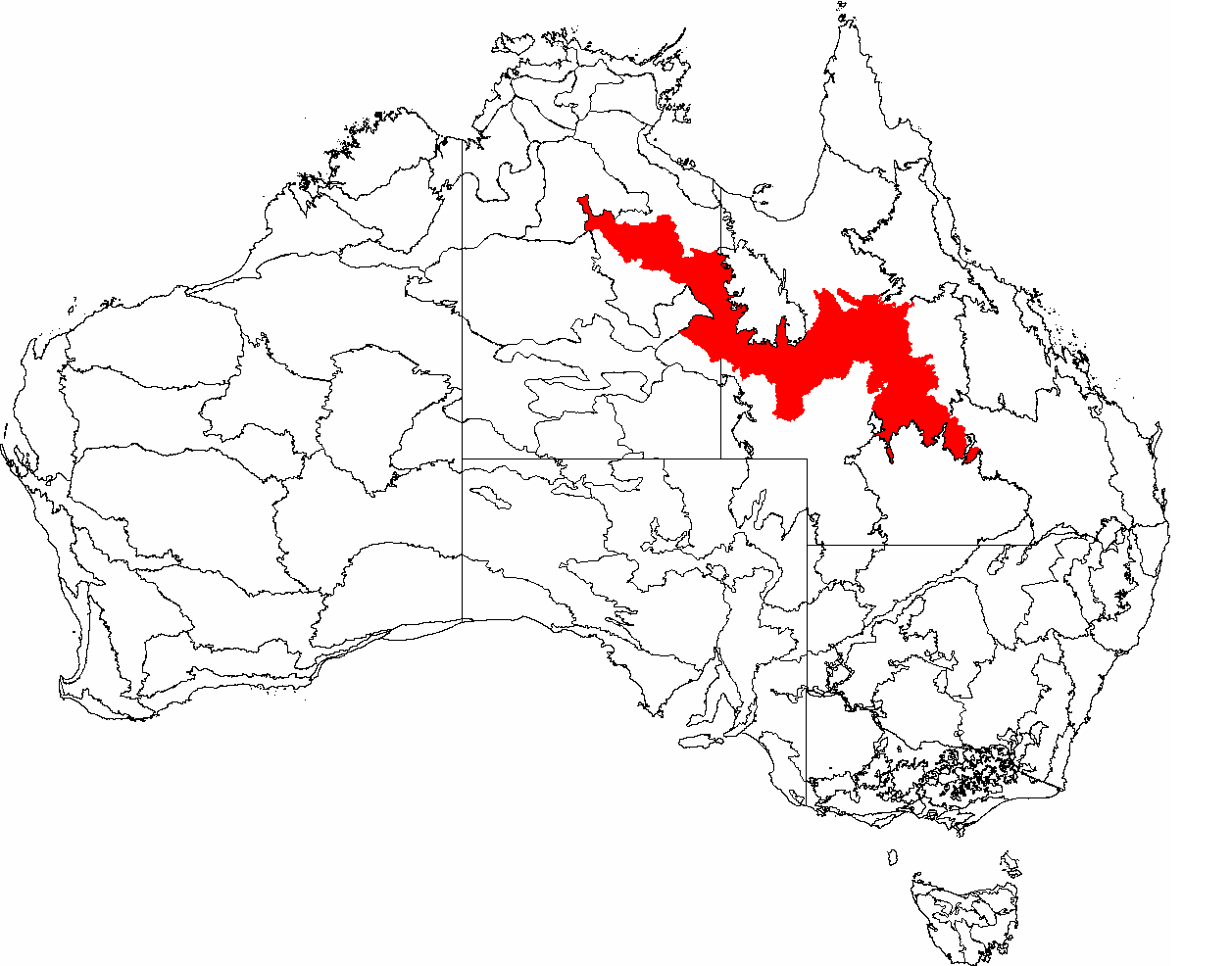
- The interim Australian bioregions, with Mitchell Grass Downs in red
- Area: 334,687.61 km^{2} (129,223.6 sq mi)
Localities around Mitchell Grass Downs:
Sturt Plateau	Gulf Fall and Uplands	Mount Isa Inlier
Tanami	Mitchell Grass Downs	Desert Uplands
Channel Country	Channel Country	Mulga Lands

The Mitchell Grass Downs (MGD) is an IBRA biogeographic region, located in the Northern Territory and Queensland, which comprises an area of 33,468,761 hectares (82,703,110 acres) with eight subregions.

IBRA regions and subregions: IBRA7
IBRA region / subregion	IBRA code	Area	States	Location in Australia
Mitchell Grass Downs	MGD	33,468,761 hectares (82,703,110 acres)	NT / Qld	
Sylvester	MGD01	1,153,283 hectares (2,849,820 acres)	NT / Qld	
Barkly Tableland	MGD02	9,479,612 hectares (23,424,630 acres)	NT / Qld	
Georgina Limestone	MGD03	2,292,026 hectares (5,663,720 acres)	NT / Qld	
Southwestern Downs	MGD04	3,715,454 hectares (9,181,090 acres)	NT / Qld	
Kynuna Plateau	MGD05	2,293,311 hectares (5,666,890 acres)	NT / Qld	
Northern Downs	MGD06	435,263 hectares (1,075,560 acres)	NT / Qld	
Central Downs	MGD07	9,378,817 hectares (23,175,560 acres)	NT / Qld	
Southern Wooded Downs	MGD08	4,720,995 hectares (11,665,830 acres)	NT / Qld	

== See also ==
- Geography of Australia
