= Gatton National Park =

National park in Queensland, Australia

- Location within Queensland
- Location: Queensland
- Nearest city: Toowoomba
- Coordinates: 27.607°S 152.302°E
- Area: 4.26 km^{2} (1.64 sq mi)
- Governing body: Queensland Parks and Wildlife Service
- Website: Official website

Gatton National Park is a national park in the Lockyer Valley Region of South East Queensland, Australia.

The park occupies the north east corner of Woodlands near Gatton. Gatton National Park lies within the Lockyer Creek water catchment and experiences a sub-tropical climate.

== Access ==
The Gatton Glenore Grove Rifle Club operates a rifle range over a section of the park on most Saturdays. Warning signs are placed for visitors prior. The park is accessible during other days of the week.

Vehicle access is not permitted in the national park which includes cars, motorbikes and bicycles. There are many walking tracks available.

== Facilities ==
There are no facilities in the park. There is road side parking available outside of the park. Camping is not permitted.

== Flora and fauna ==
The park contains a high diversity of plants and animals. The south-west corner of the park contains endangered remnant dry rainforest semi-evergreen vine thicket vegetation which has been severely cleared in the region due to agriculture. This vegetation is at risk due to fire as plants contained within the ecosystem are not fire adapted. The incursion of invasive plant species increases the risk of a fire occurring. The park also contains an isolated remnant 'of concern' regional ecosystem of open forest Eucalyptus moluccana on sedimentary rocks. Eucalyptus moluccana has been extensively cleared in the region for agriculture and is considered a vulnerable species according to IUCN Red List.

== See also ==
- Protected areas of Queensland
