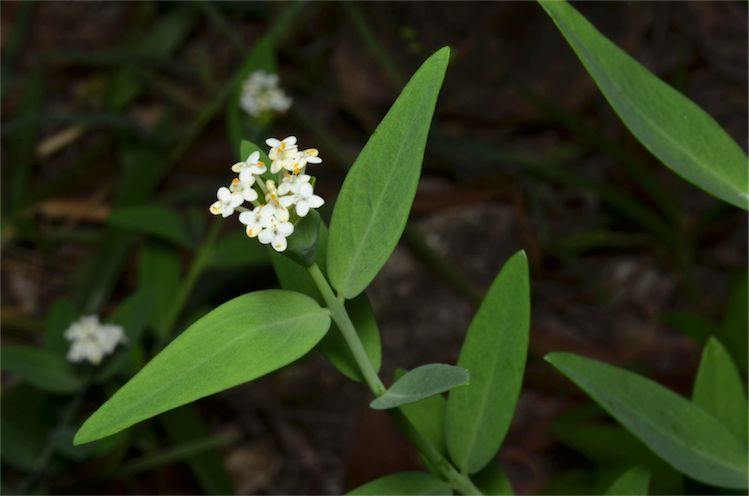
- In Cape Hillsborough National Park

Scientific classification
- Kingdom: Plantae
- Clade: Tracheophytes
- Clade: Angiosperms
- Clade: Eudicots
- Clade: Rosids
- Order: Malvales
- Family: Thymelaeaceae
- Genus: Pimelea
- Species: P. cornucopiae

Binomial name
- Pimelea cornucopiae Vahl

Synonyms
- Banksia cornucopiae (Vahl) Kuntze; Calyptostregia cornucopiae C.S.P.Foster & Henwood orth. var.; Calyptrostegia cornucopiae (Vahl) Endl.; Pimelea philippinensis C.B.Rob.; Pimelea ramosissima K.Schum.; Thecanthes cornucopiae (Vahl) Wikstr.

= Pimelea cornucopiae =

Species of shrub

Pimelea cornucopiae is a species of flowering plant in the family Thymelaeaceae and is native to north Queensland and some islands to the north of Australia, New Guinea and the Philippines. It is an erect shrub with egg-shaped leaves and clusters of white or creamy-white flowers.

== Description ==
Pimelea cornucopiae is an erect shrub that typically grows to a height of 10–50 cm (3.9–19.7 in). The leaves are narrowly egg-shaped, sometimes with the narrower end towards the base, 5–42 mm (0.20–1.65 in) long and 1.5–12 mm (0.059–0.472 in) wide. The flowers are white or creamy-white, each flower borne on a pedicel up to 5 mm (0.20 in) long, the floral tube 7–10 mm (0.28–0.39 in) long and glabrous. The sepals are usually erect, 0.8–1.3 mm (0.031–0.051 in) long and the stamens are about the same length as the sepals. Flowering occurs from February to July.

== Taxonomy ==
Pimelea cornucopiae was first formally described in 1804 by Martin Vahl in his book Enumeratio Plantarum.

== Distribution and habitat ==
This pimelea mainly grows in woodland or forest and occurs in near-coastal areas between the Torres Strait and Bundaberg in north Queensland, and in the Philippines, New Ireland, New Britain, New Guinea and the Louisiade Archipelago.
