= Sarabah National Park =

National park in Australia

- IUCN category II (national park)
- Location within Queensland
- Location: Queensland
- Nearest city: Canungra
- Coordinates: 28°02′54″S 153°07′19″E
- Area: 1.416 ha (3.50 acres)
- Established: 1973
- Governing body: Queensland Parks and Wildlife Service

Sarabah is a small national park in South East Queensland, Australia, 65 km south of Brisbane. The park lies within the catchment area of the Albert River.

The park contains the remains of lowland subtropical rainforest and fringing riparian open forest along Canungra Creek. It was declared a national park in 1973. At just 1.416 ha (3.5 acres) in size, it is Queensland's smallest national park.

== See also ==
- Protected areas of Queensland
