= Dalrymple National Park =

National park in Queensland, Australia

- IUCN category II (national park)
- Location within Queensland
- Location: Queensland
- Coordinates: 19°47′16″S 146°05′58″E
- Area: 16.6 km^{2} (6.4 sq mi)
- Established: 1990
- Governing body: Queensland Parks and Wildlife Service
- Website: www.epa.qld.gov.au/projects/park/index.cgi?parkid=217

Dalrymple is a national park in Queensland, Australia, 1108 km northwest of Brisbane.

The park has unique features such as ancient lava flows and the Burdekin River, the largest river in Queensland. This is the land of Gudjal Aboriginal people.

Among the interesting animals can be found here, bridled nailtail wallaby, greater glider and koala.

The elevation of the terrain is 275 metres above sea level.

== History ==
Remains of the old town of Dalrymple can be seen on the west bank of the Burdekin River. Built in 1864, it was the first inland town in the former British colony of North Australia. With the discovery of gold on the Cape River in 1867 and the Gilbert River in 1869, the town grew from a simple tent camp to a thriving town with five hotels and numerous stores. In 1870, however, a flood destroyed large parts of the town, and this and further gold discoveries near Ravenswood and Charters Towers led to its decline. In 1901, 34 years after the town was founded, only a few relics, such as the cemetery, fences and old mine shafts, still bore witness to its existence.

== Landscape ==
Dalrymple National Park was established to protect important geological formations that were created 2.4 million years ago. Basalt, limestone and sandstone can be found in the immediate vicinity. North of the Burdekin River, the 380-metre-high Mount Keelbottom rises 130 meters above the surrounding flatlands. To the southwest of the river are three lava flows, the youngest dating back to the eruption of the Toomba volcano 13,000 years ago, the two older layers dating back 1.3 million and 2.4 million years respectively. Some of the streams in the park, such as Fletcher and Lolworth Creek, have dug deep through the different layers of rock. In some places, basalt columns can be found on one bank of the creek, while 385-million-year-old coral limestone with numerous Devonian fossils can be found on the other.

== See also ==
- Protected areas of Queensland
