= Claremont Isles National Park =

National park in Australia

- IUCN category II (national park)
- Location within Queensland
- Location: Queensland
- Coordinates: 13°54′40″S 143°50′02″E
- Area: 0.41 km^{2} (0.16 sq mi)
- Established: 1989
- Governing body: Queensland Parks and Wildlife Service

Claremont Isles is a national park located in Queensland, Australia, 1783 km northwest of Brisbane. Established in 1989, the isles are managed by the Queensland Parks and Wildlife Service.

The isles constitute an important breeding and roosting habitat for a variety of birds, specially seabirds. The habitat consists of coral reefs and swaths of offshore seagrass. This makes it a unique habitat for the birds. To preserve the area, going ashore is prohibited.

The elevation of the terrain is 11.7 metres.

== Wildlife ==
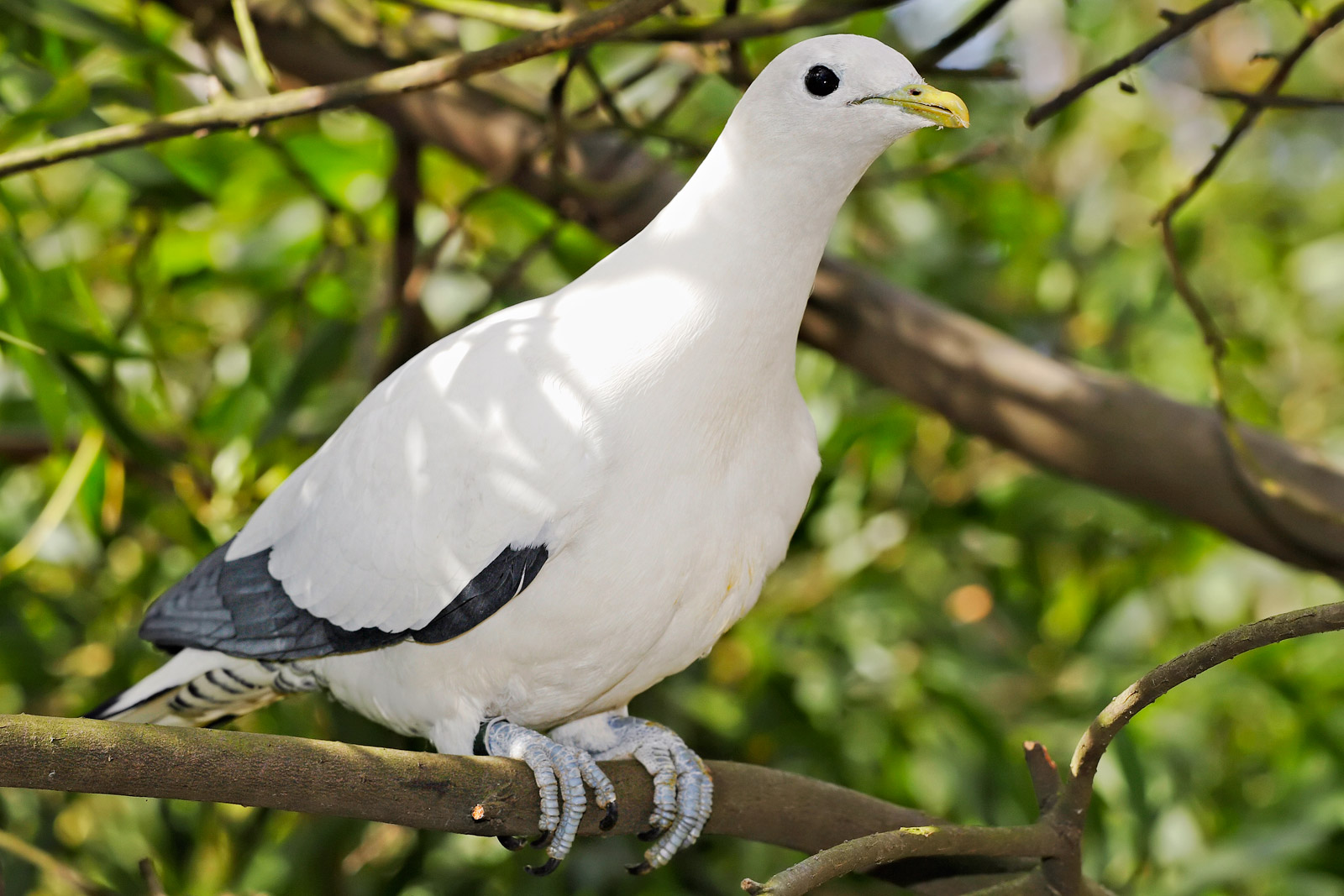
Pied imperial pigeon

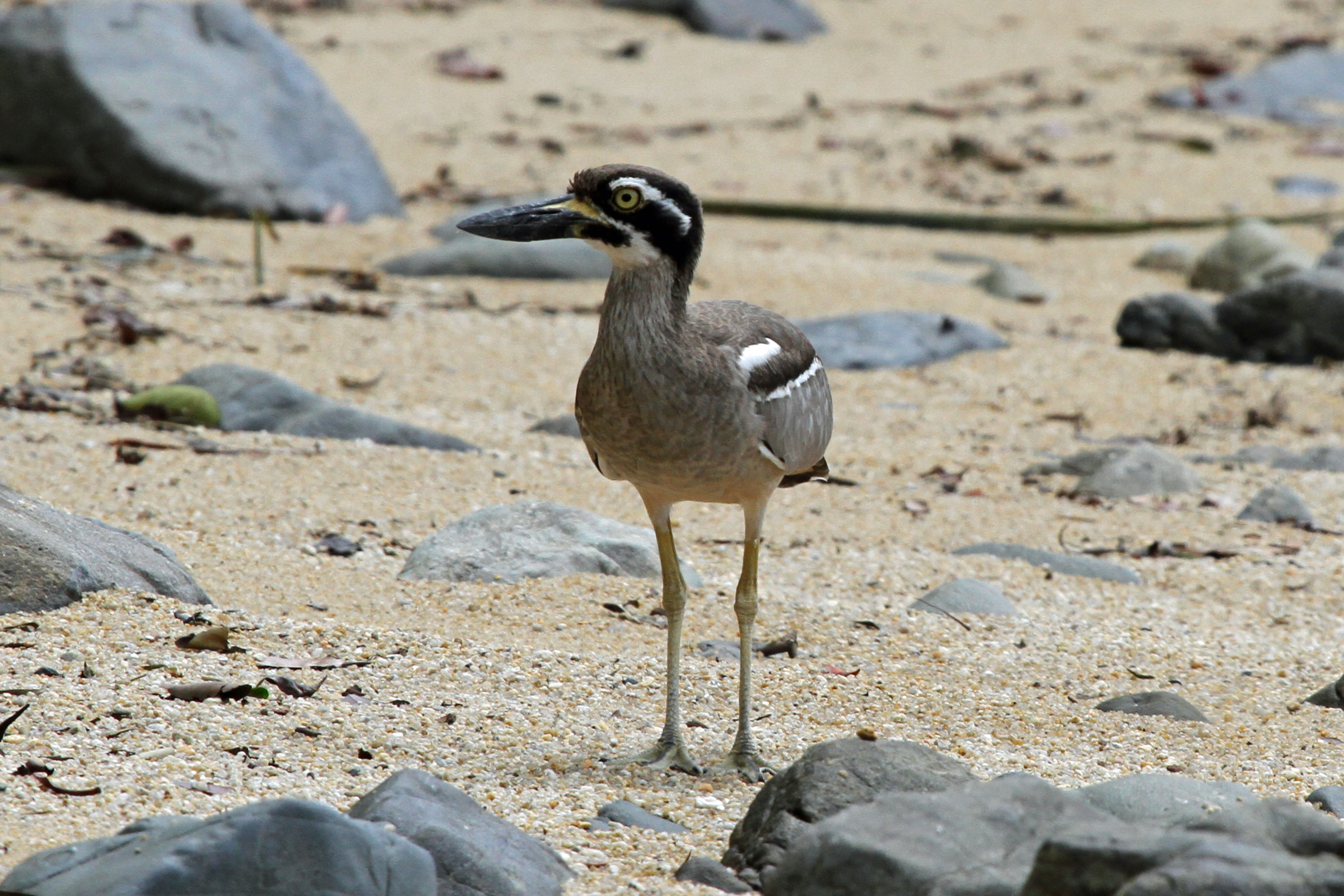
Beach stone-curlew

The isles provided habitat to a variety of birds and animals.

=== Birds ===
There are three islands in the Claremont Isles National Park: Fife, Pelican and Burkitt islands. All three islands have breeding populations of terns. Burkitt Island is an important breeding ground for the pied imperial pigeon. Migratory species such as the beach stone-curlew also flock to the island's extensive sand flats and lagoons. Australian terns lend the Pelican Island their name and Fife Island is famous for its population of wedge-tailed shearwaters.

== See also ==
- Protected areas of Queensland
