= Connell =

Connell may refer to:

== Places ==
- Connell (barony), County Kildare, Ireland
  - Great Connell Priory, a historic former house
- Connell, Washington, United States

== Other uses ==
- Connell (surname), including a list of people with the name

== See also ==
- Connelly (disambiguation)
- O'Connell (disambiguation)
