= Burrum Coast National Park =

National park in Australia

- IUCN category II (national park)
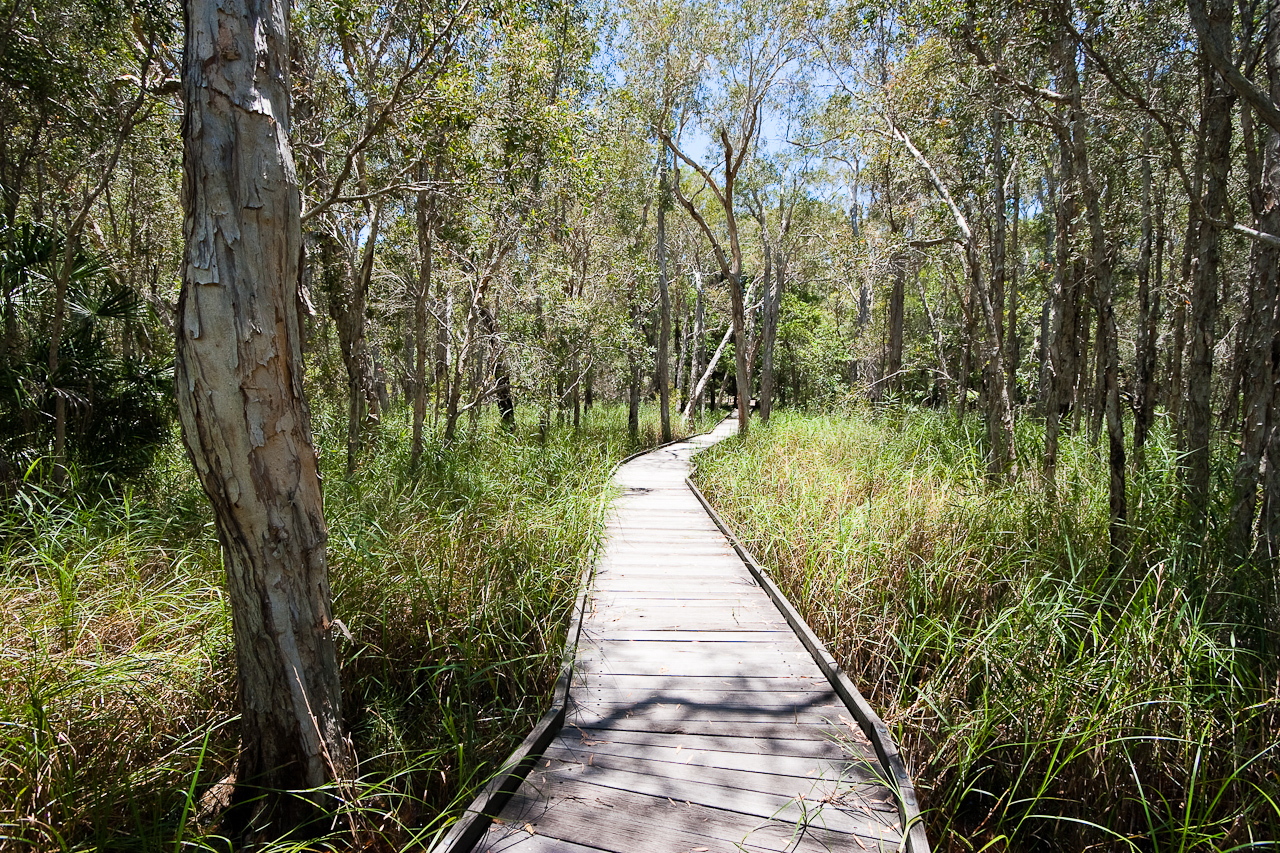
- Boardwalk at Burrum Coast National Park, December 2010

- Location within Queensland
- Location: Queensland
- Coordinates: 24°59′57″S 152°28′03″E
- Area: 225 km^{2} (87 sq mi)
- Established: 1995
- Governing body: Queensland Parks and Wildlife Service

Burrum Coast is a national park in the Bundaberg Region and Fraser Coast Region, Queensland, Australia.

A wide diversity of plant and animal species is represented in the park.

== Geography ==
The park is 281 km north of Brisbane.

The average elevation of the terrain is 17 metres above sea level.

== History ==
The Burrum Coast National Park was established in 1999 as the amalgamation of the Kinkuna, Woodgate and Burrum River national parks.

== See also ==
- Protected areas of Queensland
