= Sandbanks National Park =

National park in Australia

- IUCN category II (national park)
- Location within Queensland
- Location: Queensland
- Coordinates: 13°21′59″S 143°57′12″E
- Area: 0.11 km^{2} (0.042 sq mi)
- Established: 1989
- Governing body: Queensland Parks and Wildlife Service

Sandbanks is a national park in Far North Queensland, Australia, 1,829 km northwest of Brisbane.

== See also ==
- Protected areas of Queensland
