= Yamarrinh Wachangan Islands National Park =

National park in Queensland, Australia

- IUCN category II (national park)
- Location within Queensland
- Location: Queensland
- Coordinates: 11°06′32″S 143°00′57″E
- Area: 0.41 km^{2} (0.16 sq mi)
- Established: 1921
- Governing body: Queensland Parks and Wildlife Service

Yamarrinh Wachangan Islands (Denham Group) is a national park in Queensland, Australia, 2098 km northwest of Brisbane. The National Park consists of Aplin, Milman, Cholmondeley, Wallace, Sinclair and Cairncross islets and Boydong Island.

The park is the largest nesting place for hawksbill turtles and also supports the roosting and nesting of a large number of seabirds.

Vegetation consists of grassy areas, small parts of low closed forests, marginal mangroves and shrubs.

== See also ==
- Protected areas of Queensland
