= Judge O'Connell =

Judge O'Connell may refer to:

- Ambrose O'Connell (1881–1962), associate judge of the United States Court of Customs and Patent Appeals
- Beverly Reid O'Connell (1965–2017), judge of the United States District Court for the Central District of California
- John Joseph O'Connell (1894–1949), judge of the United States Court of Appeals for the Third Circuit

== See also ==
- Justice O'Connell (disambiguation)
