= Blackwood National Park =

National park in Australia

- IUCN category II (national park)
- Location within Queensland
- Location: Queensland
- Coordinates: 21°27′42″S 146°42′54″E
- Area: 16 km^{2} (6.2 sq mi)
- Established: 1991
- Governing body: Queensland Parks and Wildlife Service
- Website: www.nprsr.qld.gov.au/parks/blackwood

Blackwood is a national park in the Charters Towers Region, Queensland, Australia.

== Geography ==
The park is west of Mount Coolon in North Queensland, 924 km northwest of Brisbane. It is named after the Australian Blackwood tree species.

The parks is accessible via the Gregory Developmental Road. Blackwood was created to protect Brigalow Belt plant communities and includes landscapes of rugged hills and gorges, stony ridges and alluvial flats.

About 80 species of birds have been recorded in the park.

== Restrictions ==
Camping and fires are not permitted within the park.

== See also ==
- Protected areas of Queensland
