= Southwood National Park =

National park in Australia

- Location within Queensland
- Location: Queensland
- Coordinates: 27°48′53″S 150°08′08″E
- Area: 71.2 km^{2} (27.5 sq mi)
- Established: 1970
- Governing body: Queensland Parks and Wildlife Service

Southwood is a national park in Queensland, Australia, 288 km west of Brisbane.

Brigalow-belah forest remnants are conserved in this park on the western Darling Downs. Few intact examples of this vegetation type remain on the Downs. Cypress pine, poplar box, wilga bush, false sandalwood, western teatree and other plant species common throughout the semi-arid lands also grow in the park.

Southwood's scrubby forests are a refuge for wildlife. More than 92 species of birds have been seen in the park. The wonga pigeon is close to the inland limit of its range here. Large depressions known as gilgais are scattered through the park. These form by constant wetting and drying of the heavy clay soils.

This is the traditional land of the Bigambul people. Explorers Allan Cunningham and Thomas Mitchell passed this way but the surrounding area was slow to attract settlers. Formerly known as "Wild Horse Paradise", Southwood became a national park in 1970.

== See also ==
- Protected areas of Queensland
