= Triunia National Park =

National park in Australia

- IUCN category II (national park)
- Location within Queensland
- Location: Queensland
- Coordinates: 26°39′21″S 152°54′12″E
- Area: 0.18 km^{2} (0.069 sq mi)
- Established: 1994
- Governing body: Queensland Parks and Wildlife Service

Triunia is a national park in South East Queensland, Australia, 92 km north of Brisbane.

== See also ==
- Protected areas of Queensland
