= Newry Islands National Park =

National park in Queensland, Australia

- IUCN category II (national park)
- Location within Queensland
- Location: Queensland
- Coordinates: 20°51′06″S 148°53′58″E
- Area: 4.64 km^{2} (1.79 sq mi)
- Established: 1938
- Governing body: Queensland Parks and Wildlife Service

Newry Islands is a national park in North Queensland, Australia, 847 km northwest of Brisbane. It lies within the Great Barrier Reef World Heritage Area.

== See also ==
- Protected areas of Queensland
