= Hasties Swamp National Park =

National park in Australia

- IUCN category II (national park)
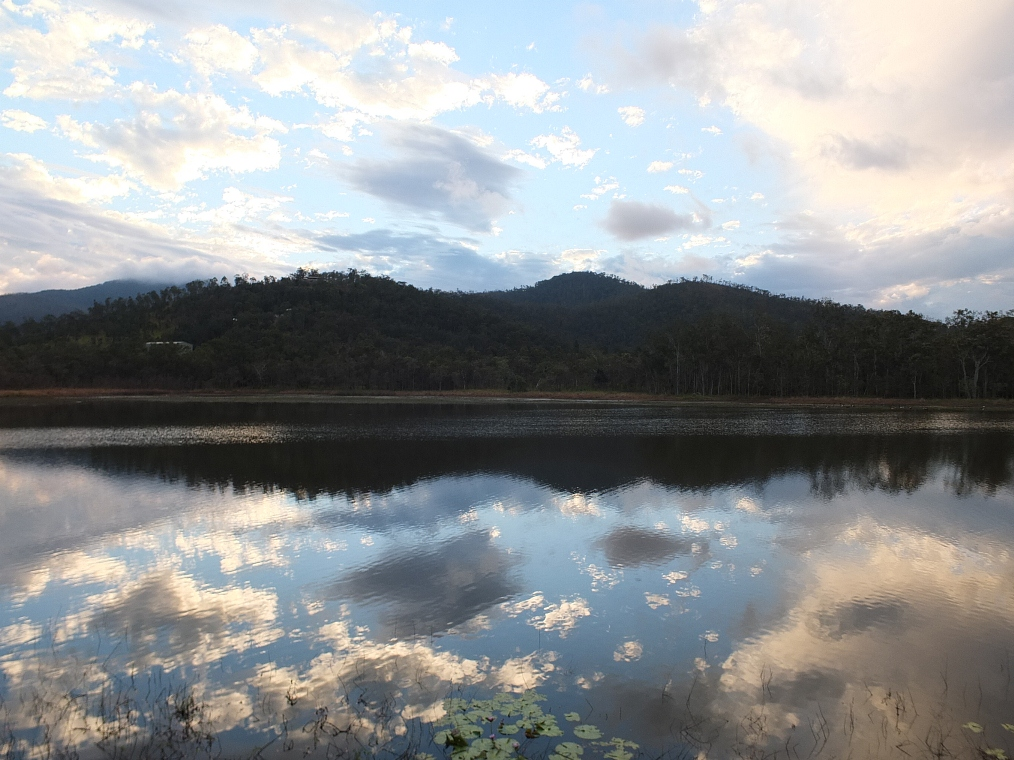

- Location within Queensland
- Location: Queensland
- Nearest city: Atherton, Queensland
- Coordinates: 17°18′01″S 145°28′27″E
- Area: 57 ha (140 acres)
- Established: 5 April 1980
- Governing body: Queensland Parks and Wildlife Service
- Website: Official website

Hasties Swamp is a national park in Queensland, Australia, 1,371 km northwest of Brisbane. The swamp is located several kilometres south of the town of Atherton in Far North Queensland. The main feature of the park is a seasonal wetland. Part of the swamp was first declared a national park on 5 April 1980.

Habitat protected within the park supports up to 300 species of birds. These include the sarus crane, pale-vented bush-hen and buff-banded rail.

A bird hide provides viewing opportunities for visitors, including those using wheelchairs.

The wetland is surrounded by open eucalypt forest. The average elevation of the terrain is 826 metres.

== See also ==
- Protected areas of Queensland
