= Coalstoun Lakes National Park =

National park in Australia

- IUCN category II (national park)
- Location within Queensland
- Location: Queensland
- Coordinates: 25°35′52″S 151°54′32″E
- Area: 26 ha (64 acres)
- Established: 1929
- Governing body: Queensland Parks and Wildlife Service

Coalstoun Lakes is a national park in Queensland, Australia, 236 km (147 mi) northwest of Brisbane. It features a volcano, Mount Le Brun, which has two craters that contain intermittent crater lakes. Mount Le Brun is one of the youngest volcanic formations in Australia, although it was formed more than 600,000 years ago. Coalstoun Lakes is Queensland's smallest national park.

The average elevation of the terrain is 277 metres (909 ft).

The lakes were named by local pioneer, Nugent Wade Brown, in 1894. There are various theories as to the origin of the name.

- One is that Coalstoun is the corruption of an Aboriginal word Goanalganai.
- Another theory is that the name 'Coalstoun' is a corruption of the word 'Colstoun'. Nugent Wade Brown's father, John Brown (1787–1860), emigrated to the Colony of New South Wales and established a property named Colstoun near what is now Gresford in the Hunter Valley in 1838.
- Colstoun was the ancestral home of the Brown family in Scotland. Colstoun is located south of Edinburgh and remains in the Brown family. According to Queensland Department of National Parks, Sport and Racing "The lakes were named after Coalstoun in Scotland by Wade Brun, manager of nearby Ban Ban Station." There is no doubt that Nugent Wade Brown and Wade Brun were the same person. His wife, Margaret Campbell-Antill, was an aunt of Major-General John Macquarie Antill.

== See also ==
- Protected areas of Queensland
