= Smith Islands National Park =

National park in Australia

- IUCN category II (national park)
- Location within Queensland
- Location: Queensland
- Coordinates: 20°35′21″S 149°06′38″E
- Area: 18.70 km^{2} (7.22 sq mi)
- Governing body: Queensland Parks and Wildlife Service

Smith Islands is a national park in North Queensland, Australia, 862 km northwest of Brisbane.

== See also ==
- Protected areas of Queensland
