= Sinclair Island (Queensland) =

Island near Cape Melville, Queensland, Australia

Coordinates: 14°33′11″S 144°54′11″E

Sinclair Island is part of the Yamarrinh Wachangan Islands (Denham Group) National Park (Cape York Peninsula Aboriginal Land), on the Great Barrier Reef, and one of the southern island in the Cole Islands group and National Park and is about 100 km south-east of Cape Melville, Queensland.

Sinclair Island is a vegetated sand cay located 15 km from the coast, well established with coconut palms and sisal that provide a habitat for a number of roosting birds and green turtles and hawksbill turtles.

This island is used by a number of tour operators. Fuel and supplies are available on the mainland at Bamaga, approximately 70 km north-west of the park.
