= Wickham National Park =

National park in Queensland, Australia

Coordinates: 27°50′00″S 153°9′32″E

Wickham National Park is a national park in South East Queensland, Australia. The park is located in Cedar Creek near Yarrabilba. Bushwalking, mountain bike riding and horseriding are popular activities taken place in the park. Wickham National Park has a sub-tropical climate and lies within the Albert River water catchment.

== See also ==
- Protected areas of Queensland
