= Humboldt National Park =

National park in Queensland, Australia

Coordinates: 24°14′31.3″S 148°56′0″E

- IUCN category II (national park)
- Location: Queensland
- Nearest city: Rolleston
- Area: 76.60 km^{2} (29.58 sq mi)
- Established: 2009
- Governing body: Queensland Parks and Wildlife Service

Humboldt is a national park in Queensland, Australia, approximately 110 km southeast of Emerald.

The park protects a wetland in the Comet River water catchment in the Brigalow Belt bioregion. Humboldt is a habitat for 148 species of animals and 278 species of plants.

== See also ==
- Protected areas of Queensland
