= Lake Buchanan (Queensland) =

Lake in Queensland, Australia

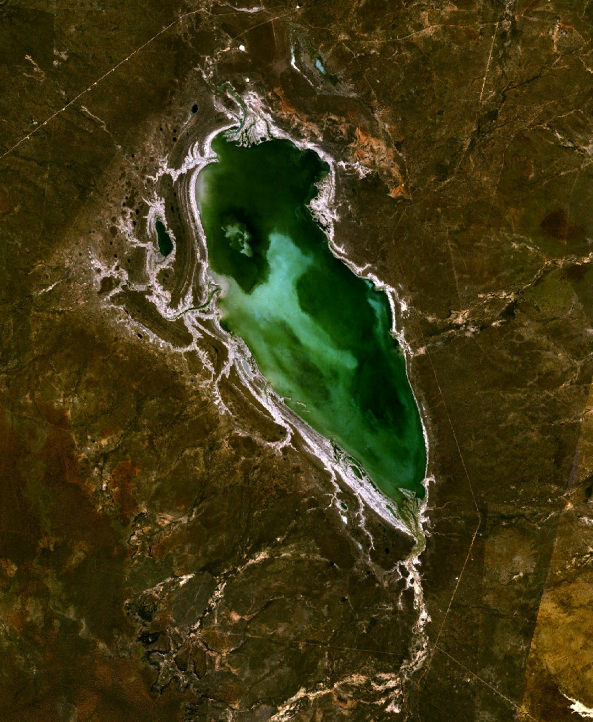
- World Wind image of Lake Buchanan, 2010.

- Location within Queensland Location within Australia
- Location: 163 km South West of Charters Towers, Queensland
- Coordinates: 21.5324°S 145.849°E
- Type: Salt lake
- Catchment area: Thomson River
- Basin countries: Australia
- Max. length: 21 km (13 mi)
- Max. width: 8 km (5.0 mi)
- Surface area: 117 km^{2} (45 sq mi)

Lake Buchanan is a flat salt lake at Pentland in the Charters Towers Region in North Queensland, Australia. It is approximately 28 kilometres (17 mi) long and 8 kilometres (5.0 mi) wide at its widest point, with a surface area of about 117 square kilometres (45 sq mi). It is part of the Thomson River catchment and part of the Desert Uplands bioregion.

Lake Buchanan is different from all other salt lakes in Australia because it occurs at a high elevation - on the Great Dividing Range. The lake is shallow and the water tends to be brackish. The land around the lake is used for grazing.

== Species ==
Lake Buchanan contains a number of significant species which are newly discovered and most probably endemic. These include the Lake Buchanan button grass (Dactyloctenium sp.), fringing rush (Fimbristylis sp. ), Lake Buchanan fringe rush, Lawrenica buchananensis (Malvaceae), and Buchanan's fairy shrimp (Branchinella buchananensis). The Lake Buchanan blue bush (Chenopodium auricomum) is a threatened species.

== See also ==
- Lake Galilee
- List of lakes of Australia
