= Mount Colosseum National Park =

National park in Australia

- IUCN category II (national park)
- Location within Queensland
- Location: Queensland
- Nearest city: Gladstone
- Coordinates: 24°24′33″S 151°35′01″E
- Area: 8.4 km^{2} (3.2 sq mi)
- Established: 1977
- Governing body: Queensland Parks and Wildlife Service
- Website: Official website

Mount Colosseum is a national park in Central Queensland, Australia, 370 kilometres (230 mi) northwest of Brisbane and about 6 kilometres (4 mi) south of the town of Miriam Vale.

Mount Colosseum is a volcanic dome and is the dominant feature on the skyline of the area. The dome rises to an elevation of 470 metres (1,542 ft) and is sparsely covered in hoop pines, while the dry rainforest below contains ironbarks and bloodwoods.

The park is undeveloped and has no facilities available for visitors. No camping is allowed in the park and no walking tracks exist within the park. It is strongly suggested that visitors visit in cooler months.

== See also ==
- Protected areas of Queensland
