= Littabella National Park =

National park in Australia

- IUCN category II (national park)
- Location within Queensland
- Location: Queensland
- Nearest city: Bundaberg
- Coordinates: 24°34′45″S 152°02′53″E
- Area: 83.8 km^{2} (32.4 sq mi)
- Established: 1980
- Governing body: Queensland Parks and Wildlife Service
- Website: Official website

Littabella is a national park in Central Queensland, Australia, 336 km north of Brisbane.

The park protects a mostly palustrine wetland within the catchments of Baffle Creek and Kolan River. Three rare or threatened animal species and one plant species have been found within the park.

== See also ==
- Protected areas of Queensland
