= Justice O'Connell =

Justice O'Connell may refer to:

- Jeremiah E. O'Connell (1883–1964), associate justice of the Rhode Island Supreme Court
- Kenneth J. O'Connell (1909–2000), chief justice of the Oregon Supreme Court
- Stephen C. O'Connell (1916–2001), associate justice of the Florida Supreme Court

== See also ==
- Judge O'Connell (disambiguation)
