= Wuthara Island National Park =

National park in Queensland, Australia

- Location within Queensland
- Location: Queensland
- Coordinates: 12°17′10″S 143°24′40″E
- Area: 1.09 km^{2} (0.42 sq mi)
- Established: 1990
- Governing body: Queensland Parks and Wildlife Service

Wuthara Island is a national park in Queensland, Australia. It is located 1,962 km northwest of Brisbane in the Great Barrier Reef Marine Park Queensland, about 40 km North East of Kutini-Payamu National Park and Lockhart River in the Cape Weymouth area in the Coral Sea just off the small locality of Portland Road.

From its founding in 1990 to 2011, the park was named Forbes Islands National Park.

== See also ==
- Protected areas of Queensland
