= Mount O'Connell National Park =

National park in Australia

- IUCN category II (national park)
- Location within Queensland
- Location: Queensland
- Nearest city: Marlborough
- Coordinates: 22°45′01″S 150°02′22″E
- Area: 7.57 km^{2} (2.92 sq mi)
- Established: 1989
- Governing body: Queensland Parks and Wildlife Service

Mount O'Connell is a small national park in Queensland, Australia, 605 km northwest of Brisbane. The park is located in the Shoalwater drainage sub-basin within the Brigalow Belt bioregion. It straddles the slopes of Mount O'Connell.

The Atalaya multiflora tree has been identified in the park.

== See also ==
- Protected areas of Queensland
