= South Eastern Queensland =

- Region
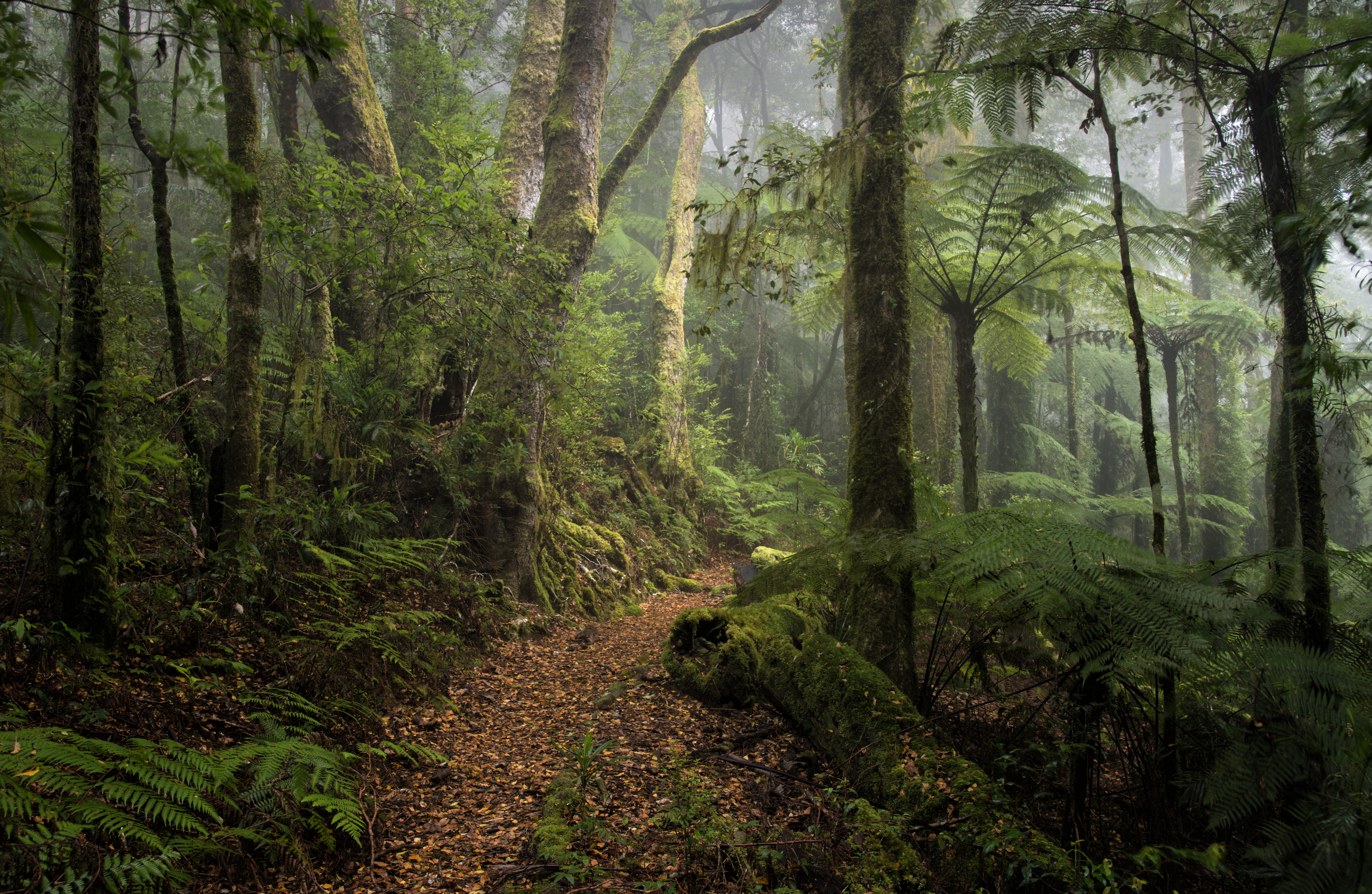
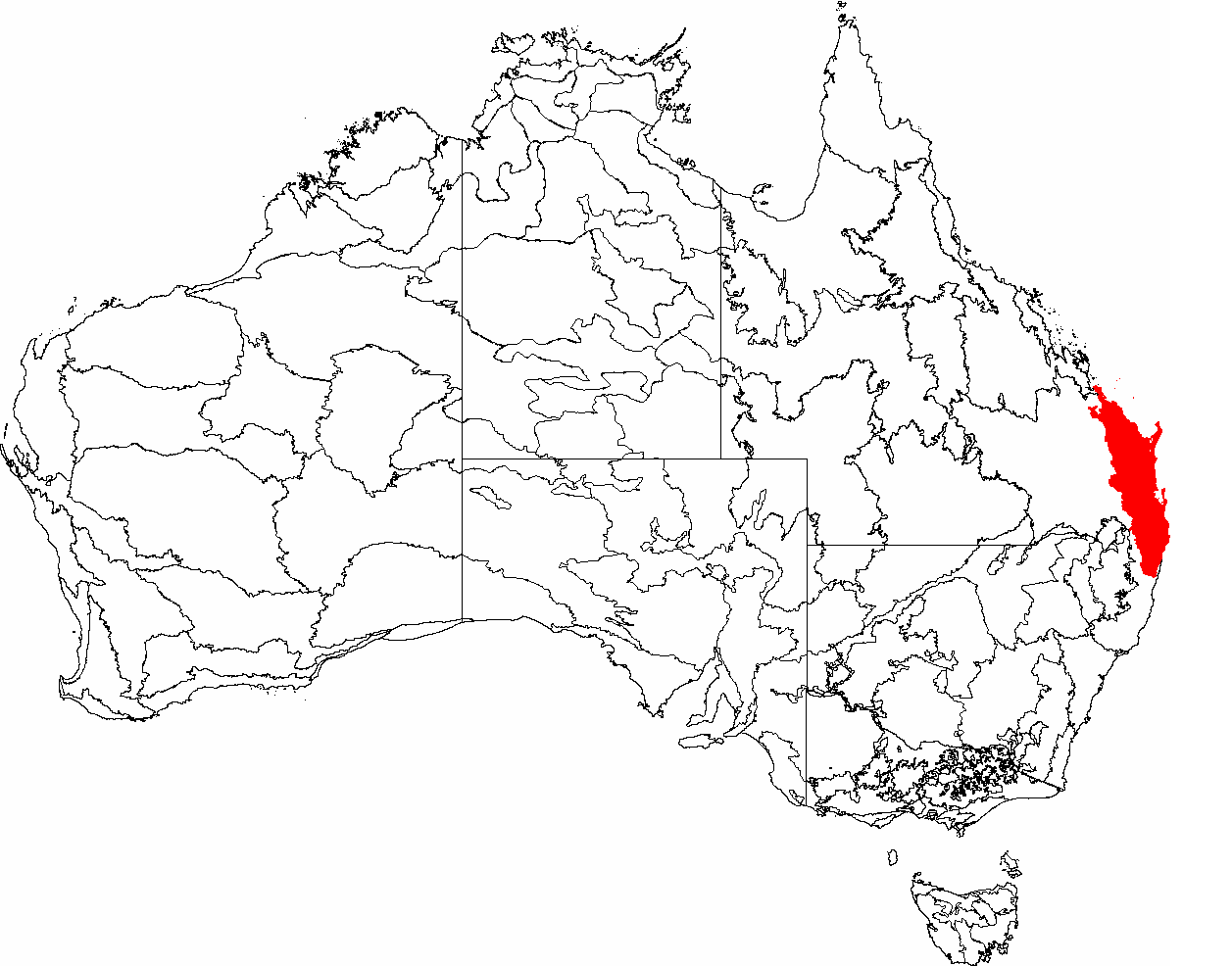
- Albert River Circuit Track in Lamington National Park The interim Australian bioregions, with South Eastern Queensland in red
- Country: Australia
- State: Australia

Area
  - Total: 78,049.21 km^{2} (30,134.97 sq mi)
Localities around South Eastern Queensland
Brigalow Belt South	Brigalow Belt North	Tasman Sea
Brigalow Belt South	South Eastern Queensland	Tasman Sea
NSW North Coast	NSW North Coast	Tasman Sea

South Eastern Queensland is an interim Australian bioregion located in south-eastern Queensland and north-eastern New South Wales. It has an area of 7,804,921 hectares (19,286,380 acres). It is one of the most biodiverse bioregions in Australia. The bioregion is home to eucalypt forests and woodlands, with rainforests on mountain slopes and in stream valleys and wallum heaths near the coast. South Eastern Queensland bioregion is the northernmost part of the Eastern Australian temperate forests ecoregion.

== Geography ==
South Eastern Queensland bioregion extends along the eastern coast of Australia in south-eastern Queensland and north-eastern New South Wales. It is bounded on the west by the Great Dividing Range, and on the east by the Tasman Sea. It is bounded on the north by the dry coastal region between Gladstone and Rockhampton, where the Brigalow Belt savannas extend to the coast. The Brigalow Belt also bounds the bioregion to the west, beyond the Great Dividing Range.

The bioregion encompasses South East Queensland, the most densely populated region in Queensland and home to over 70% of the state's population.

=== Subregions ===
South Eastern Queensland consists of 14 subregions:

- Burnett-Curtis Hills and Ranges (SEQ01) – 962,583 hectares (2,378,590 acres)
- Moreton Basin (SEQ02) – 784,969 hectares (1,939,700 acres)
- Burringbar-Conondale Ranges (SEQ03) – 630,616 hectares (1,558,290 acres)
- Sunshine Coast-Gold Coast Lowlands (SEQ04) – 351,123 hectares (867,640 acres)
- Brisbane-Barambah Volcanics (SEQ05) – 806,778 hectares (1,993,590 acres)
- South Burnett (SEQ06) – 563,866 hectares (1,393,340 acres)
- Gympie Block (SEQ07) – 859,020 hectares (2,122,700 acres)
- Burnett-Curtis Coastal Lowlands (SEQ08) – 700,181 hectares (1,730,180 acres)
- Great Sandy (SEQ09) – 356,502 hectares (880,940 acres)
- Scenic Rim (SEQ10) – 614,729 hectares (1,519,030 acres)
- Woodenbong (SEQ11) – 325,603 hectares (804,580 acres)
- Clarence Sandstones (SEQ12) – 327,829 hectares (810,080 acres)
- Clarence Lowlands (SEQ13) – 520,901 hectares (1,287,170 acres)
- Southern Great Barrier Reef (SEQ14) – 220 hectares (540 acres)

== Climate ==
South Eastern Queensland has a humid subtropical climate, with warm rainy summers and mild winters.

== Protected areas ==
The bioregion includes the Gondwana Rainforests and Fraser Island World Heritage Sites. Other protected areas include:

- Arakwal National Park
- Border Ranges National Park
- Broadwater National Park
- Broken Head Nature Reserve
- Bundjalung National Park
- Cape Byron State Conservation Area
- Gibraltar Range National Park
- Iluka Nature Reserve
- Koreelah National Park
- Mebbin National Park
- Moore Park Nature Reserve
- Nightcap National Park
- Richmond Range National Park
- Tooloom National Park
- Toonumbar National Park
- Tweed Heads Historic Site
- Tyagarah Nature Reserve
- Victoria Park Nature Reserve
- Washpool National Park
- Yuraygir National Park
