= Mitirinchi Island National Park =

National park in Queensland, Australia

- IUCN category II (national park)
- Location within Queensland
- Location: Queensland
- Coordinates: 12.40444°S 143.48917°E
- Area: 1.176 ha (2.91 acres)
- Established: 1989
- Governing body: Queensland Parks and Wildlife Service
- Website: Official website

Mitirinchi Island National Park is a national park that includes all of Quoin Island in the Shire of Cook, Queensland, Australia. It is within the Great Barrier Reef Marine Park. It is 1,942 kilometres (1,207 mi)northwest of Brisbane. It is approximately 20 kilometres (12 mi) east of Weymouth Bay and 50 kilometres (31 mi) north of Lockhart River.

The island is part of the traditional lands of the Kuuku Ya’u people.

== History ==
Quoin Island National Park was gazetted in 1994. In 2011, it was renamed Mitirinchi Island National Park, although the island itself remains officially named as Quoin Island. The name Quoin is believed to refer to the shape of the island which resembles a quoin of mire (a wedge used in naval cannons).

== Access ==
The national park is closed to visitors due to its status as a significant seabird breeding site. It is one of only three recorded breeding sites in the northern Great Barrier Reef for great frigatebirds, and is also home to a large breeding colony of black noddies.

== See also ==
- Protected areas of Queensland
