= Mount Aberdeen National Park =

National park in Australia

- IUCN category II (national park)
- Location within Queensland
- Location: Queensland
- Coordinates: 20°11′55″S 147°55′16″E
- Area: 29.10 km^{2} (11.24 sq mi)
- Established: 1967
- Governing body: Queensland Parks and Wildlife Service

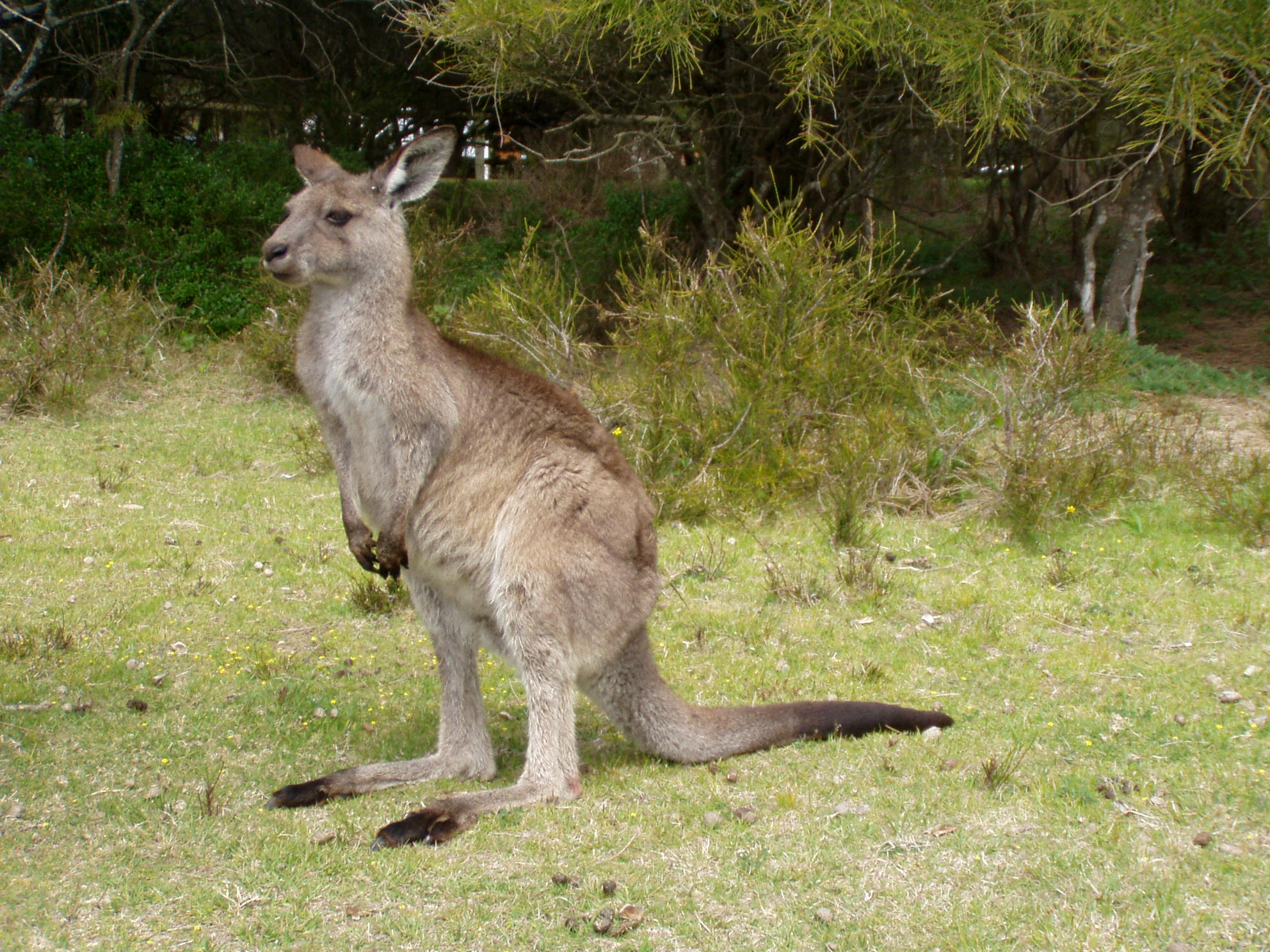

Mount Aberdeen is a national park in North Queensland, Australia, 961 km northwest of Brisbane, and 40 km south-west of Bowen. The Park is in 2 sections; the Mount Aberdeen section of 1840ha dedicated in 1952, and the Highlanders Bonnet section of 1370ha dedicated in 1967. The Park has no direct public access road or public facilities. Both Mount Aberdeen and Highlander's Bonnet are composed of granite, with Mount Aberdeen summit reaching 901 m and Highlander's Bonnet 624 m.

The park is notable for containing the sole regional occurrence of tropical cloud forest at the summit of Mount Aberdeen, with large areas of hoop pine (Araucaria cunninghamii) on the slopes of both peaks. Semi-evergreen vine thicket (subtropical dry broadleaf forest) is found in sheltered areas. There is also an unusual red gum-snow grass community in the park that is found nowhere else in Queensland. Mammals recorded in the park include unadorned rock wallabies, eastern grey kangaroos, common wallaroos, northern quolls and koalas. Found in the Park is the Mt Elliott grey ant, which is at its southern limit.

== See also ==
- Protected areas of Queensland
