= Pipeclay National Park =

National park in Australia

- IUCN category II (national park)
- Location within Queensland
- Location: Queensland
- Coordinates: 25°59′04″S 153°00′20″E
- Area: .025 km^{2} (0.0097 sq mi)
- Established: 1963
- Governing body: Queensland Parks and Wildlife Service

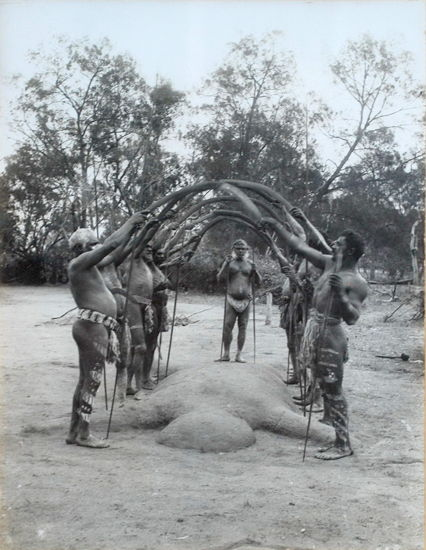
An Aboriginal Bora Ceremony, 1989

Pipeclay is a national park in Queensland, Australia, 165 km north of Brisbane. The park was originally established in 1972 to protect an intect Aboriginal bora ring, This is the "little bora ring" which represented the highest level of initiation. According to Aboroginal tradition, only those who had been initiated at the bora ring were allowed to visit it. The last initiation at the bora ring was in 1865.

It was made a national park by the Nature Conservation Act 1992. Under its management plan, recreational use is not encouraged, and access to the park is by permit only. Its name comes from the clay in the area, which was used for making pipes by both the Aboriginal and White populations.

== See also ==
- Protected areas of Queensland
