= Anderson Street Conservation Park =

Conservation park in Cairns, Australia

- Location within Queensland
- Location: Queensland
- Nearest city: Cairns
- Coordinates: 16°55′6.5″S 145°44′31″E
- Governing body: Queensland Parks and Wildlife Service
- Website: http://www.nprsr.qld.gov.au/managing/plans-strategies/statements/pdf/anderson-st-rpms.pdf

The Anderson Street Conservation Park is a protected conservation park in Manunda, Cairns, Queensland, Australia. It is managed by the Cairns Regional Council.

== History ==
The Anderson Street park was gazetted as an environmental park in 1976. In 1994 it became a conservation park under the Nature Conservation Act 1992.

== Protected biota ==
The park contains an area of endangered Melaleuca leucadendra open forest and a population of vulnerable spectacled flying-fox (Pteropus conspicillatus).

== See also ==
- Protected areas of Queensland
