= Forest Den National Park =

National park in Australia

- IUCN category II (national park)
- Location within Queensland
- Location: Queensland
- Coordinates: 22°07′18″S 145°10′31″E
- Area: 58.90 km^{2} (22.74 sq mi)
- Established: 1991
- Governing body: Queensland Parks and Wildlife Service

Forest Den is a national park in Queensland, Australia, 991 km northwest of Brisbane.

A great variety of plants is represented in the park, and the most important role of this national park is the preservation of black gidgee.

The park is located at 243 metres above sea level.

== See also ==
- Protected areas of Queensland
