= Great Basalt Wall National Park =

National park in Australia

- IUCN category II (national park)
- Location within Queensland
- Location: Queensland
- Nearest city: Charters Towers
- Coordinates: 19°52′52″S 145°43′17″E
- Area: 352 km^{2} (136 sq mi)
- Established: 1987
- Governing body: Queensland Parks and Wildlife Service

Great Basalt Wall is a national park in Queensland, Australia, 1124 km northwest of Brisbane. This national park protects 35,200 ha of land containing the Great Basalt Wall, a geological formation of the Toomba flow. The Toomba volcano erupted approximately 20,000 years ago, covered 670 square kilometres, and flowed for 120 km. It is one of the most recent volcanic eruptions in Queensland. Due to the viscous nature of the rocky lava flows the park is not accessible to the public.

249 animal species inhabit the park. The elevation of the terrain is 498 metres.

== See also ==
- Protected areas of Queensland
- List of volcanoes in Australia § Queensland
