= Malanda Falls Conservation Park =

Protected area in Queensland, Australia

Coordinates: 17.356°S 145.587°E

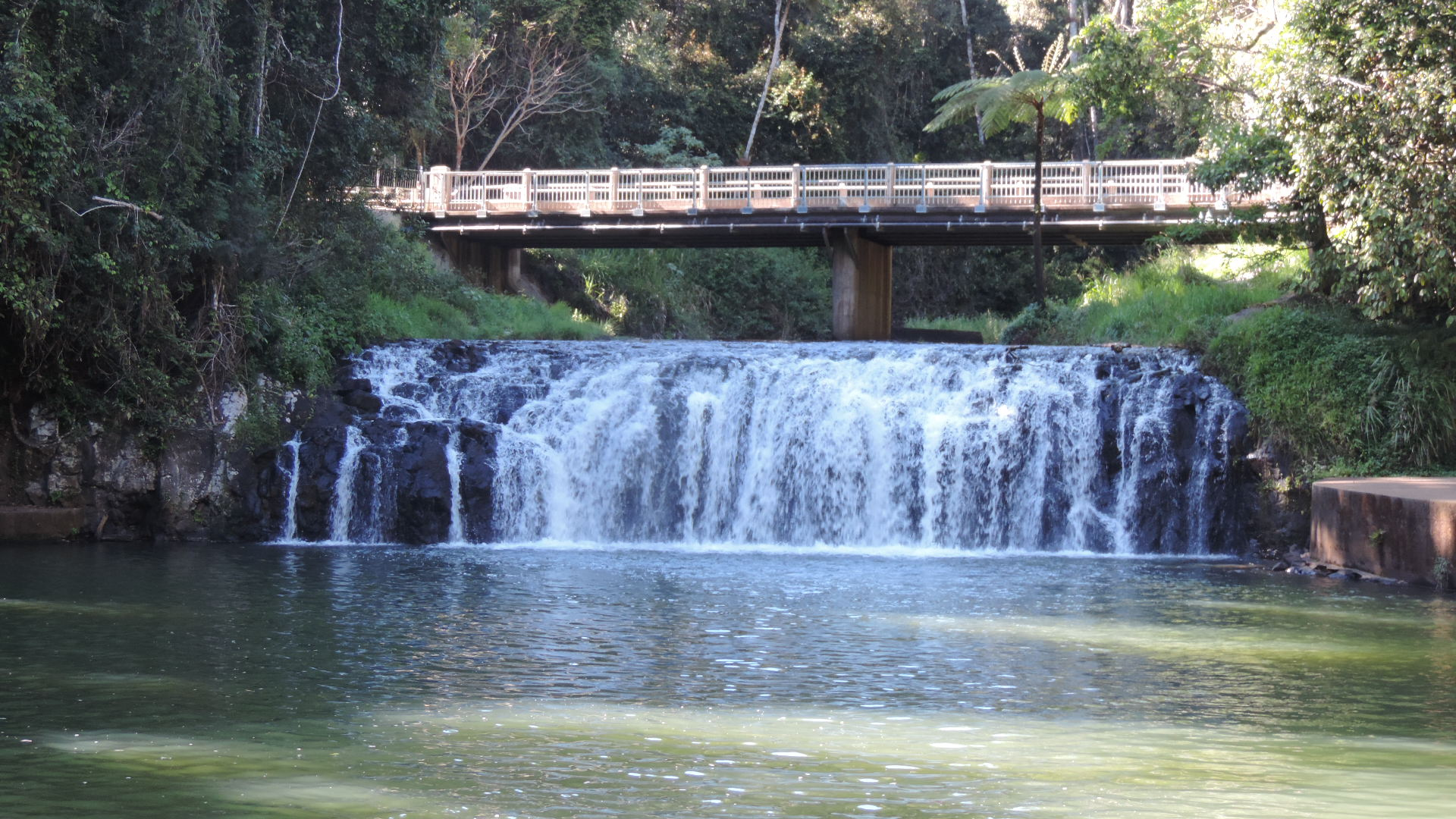
Malanda Falls, 2016

Malanda Falls Conservation Park is located on the Malanda–Atherton Road, 1 km from Malanda, Queensland, on the Atherton Tableland, Australia.

The Park protects a small tropical rainforest remnant. The Malanda Falls, on the North Johnstone River, tumble over an ancient lava flow which originated from the Mount Hypipamee area, 15 km away.

== See also ==
- Malanda Falls Swimming Pool, the heritage-listed tourism development around the falls
