= Moorrinya National Park =

National park in Australia

- IUCN category II (national park)
- Location within Queensland
- Location: Queensland
- Coordinates: 21°23′39″S 144°56′26″E
- Area: 326.07 km^{2} (125.90 sq mi)
- Established: 1993
- Governing body: Queensland Parks and Wildlife Service
- Website: Official website}

Moorrinya is a national park in North Queensland, Australia, 1,061 kilometres (659 mi) northwest of Brisbane.

== See also ==
- Protected areas of Queensland
