= White Mountains National Park =

National park in Queensland, Australia

- IUCN category II (national park)
- Location within Queensland
- Location: Queensland
- Coordinates: 20°21′41″S 144°42′59″E
- Area: 1,122 km^{2} (433 sq mi)
- Established: 1990
- Governing body: Queensland Parks and Wildlife Service

White Mountains is a national park in Queensland, Australia, approximately 1156 km northwest of Brisbane and 140 km southwest of Charters Towers and 80 km northeast of Hughenden.

On National Parks Day 2010 (Sunday, 28 March 2010), the Queensland State Government announced the addition of 4,200 hectares to the park.

== See also ==
- Protected areas of Queensland
