= Central Mackay Coast =

Bioregion in Queensland, Australia

Central Mackay Coast Queensland
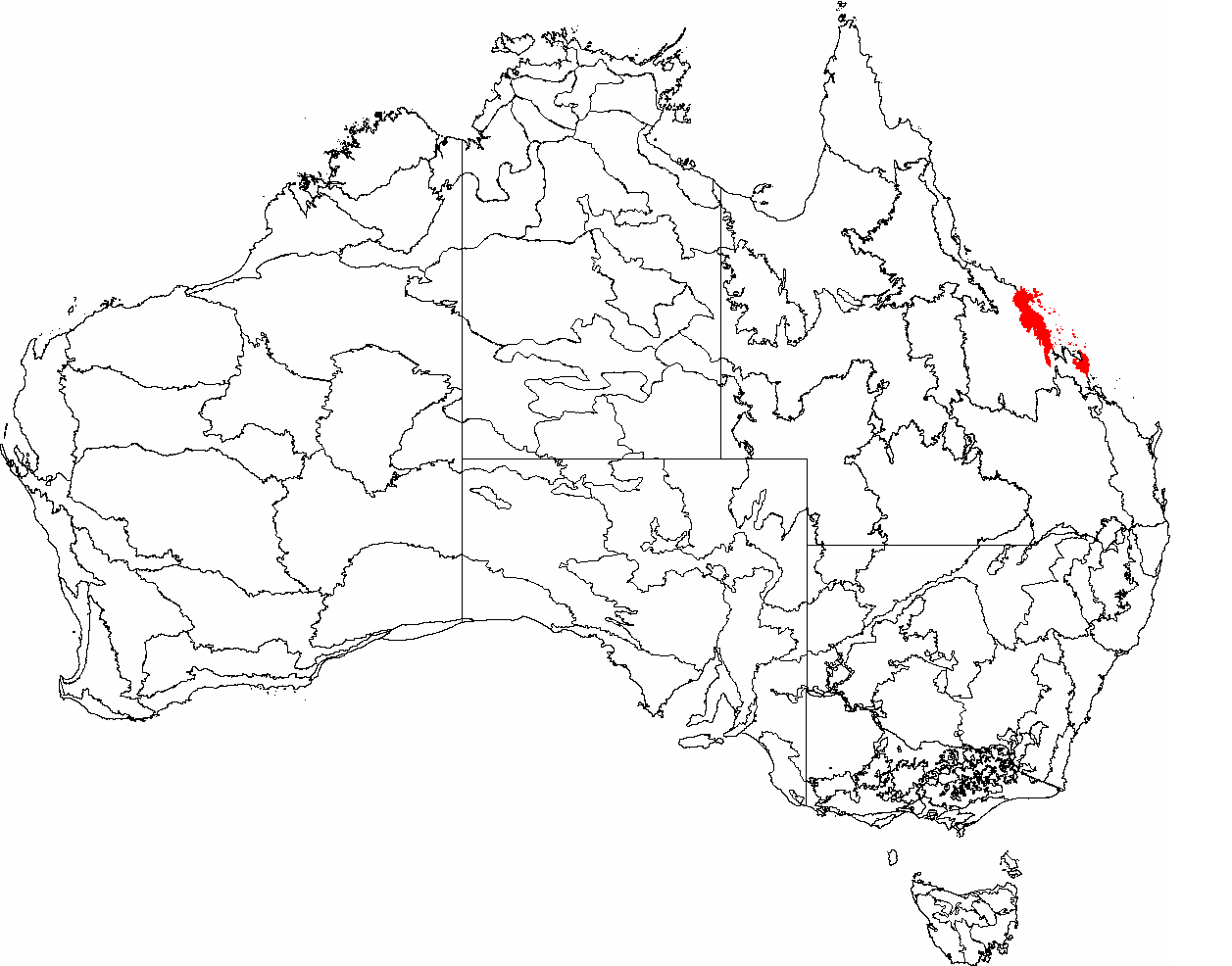
- The interim Australian bioregions, with Central Mackay Coast in red
- Area: 14,642.08 km^{2} (5,653.3 sq mi)
Localities around Central Mackay Coast:
Brigalow Belt North	Coral Sea	Coral Sea
Brigalow Belt North	Central Mackay Coast	Coral Sea
Brigalow Belt North	Brigalow Belt North	Coral Sea

Central Mackay Coast, an interim Australian bioregion, is located in Queensland, and comprises 1,464,208 hectares (3,618,140 acres).

The bioregion has the code CMC. There are six subregions.

IBRA regions and subregions: IBRA7
IBRA region / subregion	IBRA code	Area	States	Location in Australia
Central Mackay Coast	CMC	1,464,208 hectares (3,618,140 acres)	Qld	
Whitsunday	CMC01	89,179 hectares (220,370 acres)	Qld	
Proserpine - Sarina Lowlands	CMC02	466,498 hectares (1,152,740 acres)	Qld	
Clarke - Connors Ranges	CMC03	631,985 hectares (1,561,670 acres)	Qld	
Byfield	CMC04	127,697 hectares (315,550 acres)	Qld	
Manifold	CMC05	67,885 hectares (167,750 acres)	Qld	
Debella	CMC06	80,964 hectares (200,070 acres)	Qld	

== See also ==
- Geography of Australia
