= Mount Isa Inlier =

Mount Isa Inlier Queensland
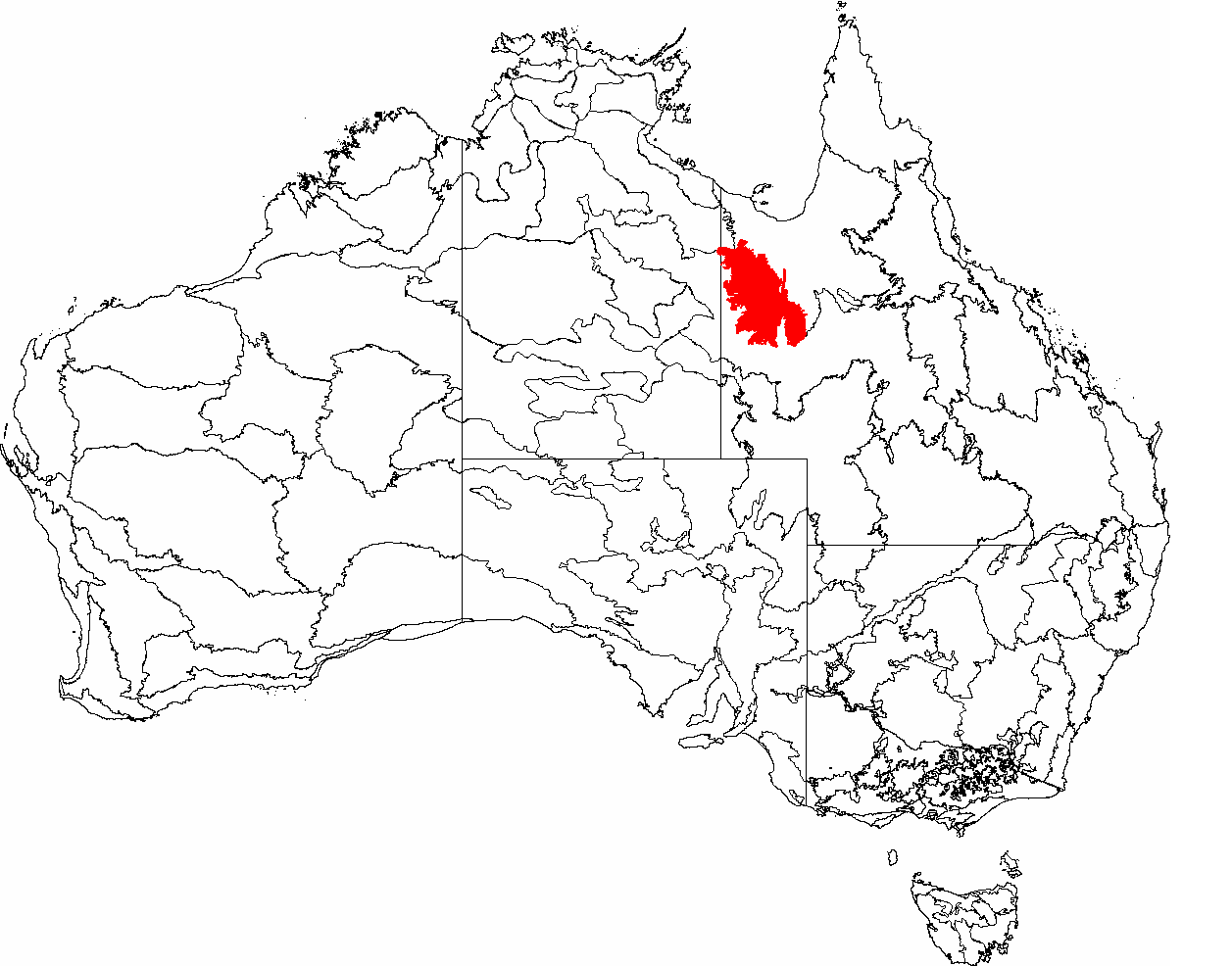
- The interim Australian bioregions, with Mount Isa Inlier in red
- Area: 67,782.63 km^{2} (26,171.0 sq mi)
Localities around Mount Isa Inlier:
Gulf Fall and Uplands	Gulf Plains	Gulf Plains
Mitchell Grass Downs	Mount Isa Inlier	Gulf Plains
MacDonnell Ranges	Mitchell Grass Downs	Mitchell Grass Downs

Mount Isa Inlier, an interim Australian bioregion, is located in the Queensland, and comprises 6,778,263 hectares (16,749,450 acres).

The bioregion has the code MII. There are three subregions.

IBRA regions and subregions: IBRA7
IBRA region / subregion	IBRA code	Area	States	Location in Australia
Mount Isa Inlier	MII	6,778,263 hectares (16,749,450 acres)	Qld	
Southwestern Plateaus and Floodouts	MII01	1,333,519 hectares (3,295,200 acres)	Qld	
Thorntonia	MII02	802,892 hectares (1,983,990 acres)	Qld	
Mount Isa	MII03	4,641,851 hectares (11,470,260 acres)	Qld	

== See also ==
- Geography of Australia
