= List of national parks of Australia =

This is a list of national parks within Australia that are managed by Australian, state and territory governments. The name may be a misnomer: nearly all parks are land owned and managed by the states and territories rather than the national government.

== Australian Capital Territory ==
Parks in this area are managed by the Transport Canberra & City Services.

Name	Coordinates	Date of establishment
Namadgi National Park	35°40′00″S 148°57′00″E	1984

== New South Wales ==
Parks in this area are managed by the NSW National Parks and Wildlife Service.

Name	Coordinates	Date of establishment
Abercrombie River National Park	34°05′38″S 149°42′29″E	1995-12
Arakwal National Park	28°39′37″S 153°37′16″E	2001
Bago Bluff National Park	31°31′56″S 152°37′44″E	1999
Bald Rock National Park	28°51′09″S 152°03′20″E	1971
Barakee National Park	31°38′30″S 151°51′06″E	1999
Barool National Park	29°39′37″S 152°11′33″E	1999
Barrington Tops National Park	32°03′10″S 151°29′38″E	1969
Basket Swamp National Park	28°55′59″S 152°09′11″E	1999
Belford National Park	32°39′S 151°18′E	2003-01-01
Bellinger River National Park	30°24′34″S 152°41′38″E	1997
Ben Halls Gap National Park	31°37′11″S 151°11′06″E	1995-12
Benambra National Park	35°46′50″S 147°05′55″E	2001-01
Beowa National Park	37°10′43″S 149°58′56″E	1971
Berowra Valley National Park	33°40′54″S 151°06′04″E	2012
Biamanga National Park	36°27′04″S 149°56′31″E	1994
Bindarri National Park	30°17′42″S 152°55′59″E	1999
Biriwal Bulga National Park	31°30′26″S 152°18′23″E	1999
Blue Mountains National Park	33°58′04″S 150°18′15″E	1959
Bongil Bongil National Park	30°23′55″S 153°02′05″E	1995-03-15
Boonoo Boonoo National Park	28°49′03″S 152°10′42″E	1982
Booti Booti National Park	32°14′40″S 152°32′36″E	1992
Border Ranges National Park	28°21′35″S 152°59′10″E	1979
Botany Bay National Park	34°01′14″S 151°13′29″E	1984
Bouddi National Park	33°31′00″S 151°24′00″E	1967-10-01
Bournda National Park	36°28′36″S 149°55′08″E	1992-04-24
Brindabella National Park	35°13′54″S 148°46′44″E	1996
Brisbane Water National Park	33°27′25″S 151°18′04″E	1967-10-01
Broadwater National Park	29°03′14″S 153°24′36″E	1974
Budawang National Park	35°25′12″S 150°02′42″E	1977
Budderoo National Park	34°39′59″S 150°39′29″E	1986
Bugong National Park	34°49′21″S 150°26′49″E	2001-01-01
Bundjalung National Park	29°14′51″S 153°19′43″E	1980
Bungawalbin National Park	29°05′53″S 153°08′38″E	1999
Bungonia National Park	34°47′50″S 150°00′59″E	2010-05
Butterleaf National Park	29°31′08″S 152°00′43″E	1999
Capoompeta National Park	29°23′34″S 152°00′32″E	1999
Carrai National Park	30°53′35″S 152°14′31″E	1999
Cascade National Park	30°15′29″S 152°48′31″E	1999
Cathedral Rock National Park	30°25′51″S 152°16′01″E	1978
Cattai National Park	33°32′50″S 150°53′49″E	1992
Chaelundi National Park	29°56′39″S 152°30′39″E	1997
Clyde River National Park	35°40′42″S 150°08′57″E	2000
Cocoparra National Park	34°06′57″S 146°13′23″E	1969-12-03
Conimbla National Park	33°44′54″S 148°26′21″E	1980
Conjola National Park	35°14′57″S 150°28′33″E	1994
Coolah Tops National Park	31°45′03″S 150°04′17″E	1996
Coorabakh National Park	31°42′44″S 152°31′21″E	1999
Cottan-Bimbang National Park	31°21′02″S 152°08′02″E	1999
Crowdy Bay National Park	31°48′59″S 152°43′17″E	1972
Culgoa National Park	29°04′50″S 147°02′07″E	1996
Cunnawarra National Park	30°37′29″S 152°13′02″E	1999
Deua National Park	35.9742°S 149.721°E	1979
Dharawal National Park	34°12′14″S 150°51′05″E	2012
Dharug National Park	33°22′08″S 151°03′07″E	1967-10-01
Dooragan National Park	31°39′52″S 152°46′26″E	1997
Dorrigo National Park	30°20′53″S 152°49′19″E	1967
Dunggir National Park	30°40′36″S 152°39′07″E	1997
Eurobodalla National Park	36°07′50″S 150°06′58″E	1995-12-22
Fortis Creek National Park	29°25′47″S 152°52′46″E	1997
Gardens of Stone National Park	33°09′17″S 150°02′27″E	1994
Garigal National Park	33°42′21″S 151°14′10″E	1991
Garrawilla National Park	31°06′47″S 149°38′20″E	2005
Georges River National Park	33°58′58″S 151°01′55″E	1992
Georges River Koala National Park		2025/2026
Ghin-Doo-Ee National Park	32°15′44″S 152°07′01″E	1999
Gibraltar Range National Park	29°33′16″S 152°19′26″E	1967-10-01
Goobang National Park	32°41′08″S 148°20′10″E	1995-12-22
Goonengerry National Park	28°34′47″S 153°24′17″E	1999
Goulburn River National Park	32°14′00″S 150°00′00″E	1983
Great Koala National Park		2026
Gulaga National Park	36°18′24″S 150°01′09″E	2001
Gundabooka National Park	30°30′10″S 145°42′50″E	1996-04
Guy Fawkes River National Park	29°57′47″S 152°14′00″E	1972
Hat Head National Park	31°04′49″S 153°01′48″E	1972
Heathcote National Park	34°07′49″S 150°58′16″E	1967-10-01
Indwarra National Park	30°05′08″S 151°15′02″E	1999
Jervis Bay National Park	34°59′14″S 150°45′22″E	1995
Jindalee National Park	34°30′44″S 148°02′08″E	2011-01-01
Junuy Juluum National Park	30°17′57″S 152°43′38″E	1999
Kanangra-Boyd National Park	33°56′16″S 150°05′27″E	1969-12-03
Kinchega National Park	32°32′39″S 142°17′49″E	1967
Kings Plains National Park	29°34′48″S 151°21′56″E	1988
Koreelah National Park	28°18′19″S 152°26′20″E	1999
Kosciuszko National Park	36°04′20″S 148°20′56″E	1944
Ku-ring-gai Chase National Park	33°39′04″S 151°12′04″E	1894
Kumbatine National Park	31°08′35″S 152°36′05″E	1999
Kwiambal National Park	29°09′15″S 150°59′02″E	2000-05-19
Lachlan Valley National Park	33°45′24″S 145°06′46″E	2010-07
Lane Cove National Park	33°47′01″S 151°08′20″E	1992
Livingstone National Park	35°22′08″S 147°21′36″E	2001
Macquarie Pass National Park	34°34′10″S 150°39′25″E	1969-12-03
Mallanganee National Park	28°55′09″S 152°45′13″E	1999
Mallee Cliffs National Park	34°10′31″S 142°34′37″E	1977
Maria National Park	31°09′46″S 152°52′24″E	1999
Marramarra National Park	33°31′30″S 151°03′29″E	1979
Maryland National Park	28°30′17″S 152°04′40″E	1999
Mebbin National Park	28°26′49″S 153°10′12″E	1999
Meroo National Park	35°26′54″S 150°23′50″E	2001
Mimosa Rocks National Park	36°40′00″S 149°56′10″E	1973
Mooball National Park	28°23′18″S 153°27′53″E	1999
Morton National Park	35°10′55″S 150°12′29″E	1967-10-01
Mount Clunie National Park	28°19′27″S 152°31′12″E	1999
Mount Imlay National Park	36°28′00″S 149°35′00″E	1972
Mount Jerusalem National Park	28°29′04″S 153°21′28″E	1995-12-22
Mount Kaputar National Park	30°17′26″S 150°08′34″E	1959
Mount Nothofagus National Park	28°19′03″S 152°38′01″E	1999
Mount Pikapene National Park	29°00′40″S 152°41′42″E	1999
Mount Royal National Park	32°12′01″S 151°19′25″E	1997
Mount Warning National Park	28°23′23″S 153°16′07″E	1967
Mummel Gulf National Park	31°18′45″S 151°50′40″E	1999
Mungo National Park	33°44′56″S 143°08′10″E	1979
Murramarang National Park	35°36′04″S 150°19′52″E	1973
Murray Valley National Park	35°47′36″S 145°01′37″E	2010
Murrumbidgee Valley National Park	34°42′54″S 146°12′04″E	2010
Mutawintji National Park	31°08′48″S 142°22′52″E	1998
Myall Lakes National Park	32°29′41″S 152°20′11″E	1972
Nangar National Park	33°25′32″S 148°30′15″E	1983-08-05
Narriearra Caryapundy Swamp National Park	29°12′54″S 142°31′48″E	2021-12-17
Nattai National Park	34°17′22″S 150°21′36″E	1991
New England National Park	30°35′34″S 152°27′29″E	1935
Nightcap National Park	28.5439°S 153.293°E	1983
Nowendoc National Park	31°31′58″S 151°35′52″E	1999
Nymboi-Binderay National Park	30°06′31″S 152°43′55″E	1997
Nymboida National Park	29°38′39″S 152°25′05″E	1980
Oolambeyan National Park	34°43′17″S 145°16′23″E	2001
Oxley Wild Rivers National Park	30°59′47″S 152°00′36″E	1986
Paroo-Darling National Park	31°31′S 143°54′E	2000
Popran National Park	33°22′37″S 151°10′48″E	1994
Ramornie National Park	29°42′41″S 152°40′24″E	1999
Richmond Range National Park	28°35′44″S 152°42′51″E	1997
Royal National Park	34°07′21″S 151°03′50″E	1879
Scheyville National Park	33°36′24″S 150°53′20″E	1996
Sea Acres National Park	31°27′50″S 152°55′52″E	1987
Seven Mile Beach National Park	34°48′48″S 150°45′25″E	1971
Single National Park	29°59′49″S 151°24′41″E	1999
South East Forest National Park	36°59′14″S 149°28′34″E	1997
Sturt National Park	29°05′37″S 141°30′32″E	1972
Sydney Harbour National Park	33°48′47″S 151°17′30″E	1975
Tallaganda National Park	35°44′37″S 149°28′53″E	2001-01-01
Tapin Tops National Park	31°39′49″S 152°11′13″E	1999
Tarlo River National Park	34°30′07″S 149°55′34″E	1982
Thirlmere Lakes National Park	34°13′32″S 150°32′20″E	1972
Tomaree National Park	32°45′10″S 152°08′27″E	1984
Tooloom National Park	28°26′47″S 152°27′13″E	1995-12-22
Toonumbar National Park	28°29′16″S 152°43′33″E	1995-12-22
Toorale National Park	30°15′54″S 145°24′04″E	2010-11-26
Towarri National Park	31°50′45″S 150°04′25″E	1998
Turon National Park	33°11′55″S 149°56′02″E	2002
Ulidarra National Park	30°15′01″S 153°04′50″E	1999
Wadbilliga National Park	36°28′00″S 149°35′00″E	1979
Wallaga Lake National Park	36°22′18″S 150°01′44″E	1972
Wallingat National Park	32°18′04″S 152°26′07″E	1999
Warra National Park	29°59′30″S 151°55′40″E	1999
Warrabah National Park	30°32′42″S 150°56′46″E	1984
Warrumbungle National Park	31°17′32″S 149°00′29″E	1967
Washpool National Park	29°20′49″S 152°19′59″E	1983
Watagans National Park	33°00′18″S 151°23′35″E	1999
Weddin Mountains National Park	33°58′20″S 148°01′23″E	1971
Werakata National Park	32°47′04″S 151°23′17″E	1999
Werrikimbe National Park	31°12′00″S 152°14′00″E	1975
Willandra National Park	33°14′07″S 144°56′19″E	1972
Willi Willi National Park	31°10′43″S 152°29′27″E	1996
Woko National Park	31°45′17″S 151°47′24″E	1982
Wollemi National Park	32°52′26″S 150°29′31″E	1979
Woomargama National Park	35°52′17″S 147°29′06″E	2001
Wyrrabalong National Park	33°17′35″S 151°32′35″E	1991
Yabbra National Park	29°56′39″S 152°30′39″E	1999
Yanga National Park	34°39′00″S 143°34′59″E	2005
Yarrobil National Park	32°17′56″S 149°22′12″E	2005
Yengo National Park	33°02′32″S 150°47′10″E	1988
Yuraygir National Park	29°54′19″S 153°13′37″E	1980

== Northern Territory ==
Name	Coordinates	Date of establishment	Managed by
Barranyi (North Island) National Park	15°34′10″S 136°52′08″E	1991	Parks and Wildlife Commission of the Northern Territory
Charles Darwin National Park	12°27′03″S 130°52′24″E	1998	Parks and Wildlife Commission of the Northern Territory
Davenport Murchison National Park	20°51′36″S 134°56′28″E	1993	Parks and Wildlife Commission of the Northern Territory
Djukbinj National Park	12°08′00″S 131°17′10″E	1997	Parks and Wildlife Commission of the Northern Territory
Dulcie Ranges National Park	22°34′40″S 135°36′29″E	1991	Parks and Wildlife Commission of the Northern Territory
Elsey National Park	14°57′11″S 133°11′35″E	1991	Parks and Wildlife Commission of the Northern Territory
Finke Gorge National Park	24°08′41″S 132°49′05″E	1967	Parks and Wildlife Commission of the Northern Territory
Judbarra / Gregory National Park	15°38′02″S 131°16′01″E	1990	Parks and Wildlife Commission of the Northern Territory
Kakadu National Park	13°02′11″S 132°26′23″E	1979-04-05	Director of National Parks
Keep River National Park	15°48′59″S 129°08′24″E	1991	Parks and Wildlife Commission of the Northern Territory
Limmen National Park	15°02′12″S 135°08′35″E	2012	Parks and Wildlife Commission of the Northern Territory
Litchfield National Park	13°03′17″S 130°54′18″E	1986	Parks and Wildlife Commission of the Northern Territory
Mary River National Park	12°08′00″S 131°17′08″E	2007	Parks and Wildlife Commission of the Northern Territory
Nitmiluk National Park	14.3122°S 132.423°E	1989	Parks and Wildlife Commission of the Northern Territory
Uluṟu-Kata Tjuṯa National Park	25°18′44″S 131°01′07″E	1958-01-23	Director of National Parks
Watarrka National Park	24°15′06″S 131°37′55″E	1989	Parks and Wildlife Commission of the Northern Territory
West MacDonnell National Park	23°26′11″S 132°25′05″E	1992	Parks and Wildlife Commission of the Northern Territory

== Queensland ==
Parks in this area are managed by the Queensland Parks and Wildlife Service

Name	Coordinates	Date of establishment
Alton National Park	27°59′23″S 149°18′48″E	1973
Alwal National Park	15°12′12″S 143°34′48″E	2010
Annan River (Yuku Baja-Muliku) National Park	15°34′00″S 145°12′25″E	2006
Apudthama National Park	10°55′16″S 142°37′37″E	1994
Astrebla Downs National Park	24°12′41″S 140°34′09″E	1996
Auburn River National Park	25°43′18″S 151°03′07″E	1964
Barnard Island Group National Park	17°40′29″S 146°10′22″E	1994
Barron Gorge National Park	16°50′34″S 145°39′07″E	1940
Beeron National Park	26°00′23″S 151°18′52″E	2009
Bellthorpe National Park	26°51′57″S 152°41′20″E	
Bendidee National Park	28°18′01″S 150°31′04″E	1979
Blackbraes National Park	19°28′44″S 144°10′53″E	1998
Blackdown Tableland National Park	23°43′25″S 149°03′36″E	1991
Blackwood National Park	21°27′42″S 146°42′54″E	1991
Bladensburg National Park	22°30′12″S 142°59′17″E	1984
Boodjamulla National Park	18°42′05″S 138°29′17″E	1985
Bowling Green Bay National Park	19°12′48″S 147°02′02″E	1977
Brampton Islands National Park	20°47′15″S 149°17′08″E	1968
Bribie Island National Park	26°52′02″S 153°07′36″E	1994
Broad Sound Islands National Park	21°48′49″S 149°47′14″E	2000
Bulburin National Park	24°38′57″S 151°30′29″E	2006
Bulleringa National Park	17°34′49″S 143°49′44″E	1992
Bunya Mountains National Park	26°47′58″S 151°32′13″E	1908
Burleigh Head National Park	28°05′43″S 153°27′26″E	1994
Burrum Coast National Park	24°59′57″S 152°28′03″E	1994
Byfield National Park	22°47′02″S 150°43′54″E	1988
Camooweal Caves National Park	20°01′09″S 138°11′24″E	1988
Cape Hillsborough National Park	20°53′56″S 148°59′38″E	1985
Cape Melville National Park	14°16′35″S 144°30′58″E	1973
Cape Palmerston National Park	21°35′25″S 149°25′39″E	1976
Cape Upstart National Park	19°42′48″S 147°45′39″E	1969
Capricorn Coast National Park	23°07′20″S 150°44′38″E	1992
Capricornia Cays National Park	23°30′29″S 152°05′27″E	1994
Carnarvon National Park	24°38′09″S 147°59′49″E	1932
Castle Tower National Park	24°09′27″S 151°18′25″E	1932
Cedar Bay National Park	15°46′37″S 145°20′46″E	1977
Chesterton Range National Park	26°09′15″S 147°19′27″E	1992
Chillagoe-Mungana Caves National Park	17°05′30″S 144°23′35″E	1995
Claremont Isles National Park	13°54′40″S 143°50′02″E	1989
Clump Mountain National Park	17°49′13″S 146°05′44″E	1963
Coalstoun Lakes National Park	25°35′52″S 151°54′32″E	1929
Conondale National Park	26°39′47″S 152°38′44″E	1977
Conway National Park	20°15′48″S 148°45′54″E	1938
Crater Lakes National Park	17°14′45″S 145°37′44″E	1994
Crows Nest National Park	27°15′14″S 152°04′27″E	1992
Cudmore National Park	22°55′30″S 146°18′14″E	1998
Culgoa Floodplain National Park	28°49′21″S 146°49′33″E	1994
Currawinya National Park	28°47′01″S 144°28′41″E	1991
Curtis Island National Park	23°31′49″S 151°13′16″E	1992
Daintree National Park	15°57′33″S 145°24′07″E	1988
Dalrymple National Park	19°47′16″S 146°05′58″E	1990
Danbulla National Park and State Forest	17°06′22″S 145°36′40″E	
Davies Creek National Park	17°00′35″S 145°34′54″E	1971
Deepwater National Park	24°15′40″S 151°53′31″E	1988
Diamantina National Park	23°21′26″S 141°08′10″E	1993
Dinden National Park	17°00′35″S 145°37′00″E	2005
Dipperu National Park	21°56′17″S 148°42′55″E	1969
Djiru National Park	17°53′30″S 146°03′42″E	2005
Dryander National Park	20°13′05″S 148°33′57″E	1938
Dularcha National Park	26°46′36″S 152°57′40″E	1921
Endeavour River National Park	15°26′31″S 145°13′01″E	1975
Epping Forest National Park	22°21′06″S 146°42′05″E	1971
Errk Oykangand National Park	15°28′10″S 142°05′06″E	1977
Eubenangee Swamp National Park	17°25′24″S 145°57′25″E	1968
Eudlo Creek National Park	26°42′25″S 152°57′43″E	1951
Eungella National Park	20°51′41″S 148°39′52″E	1936
Expedition National Park	25°07′44″S 148°51′56″E	1991
Fairlies Knob National Park	25°30′18″S 152°17′35″E	1910
Family Islands National Park	17°55′33″S 146°08′07″E	1994
Fitzroy Island National Park	16°55′48″S 145°59′32″E	1939
Flinders Group National Park	14°04′25″S 144°15′21″E	1939
Forest Den National Park	22°07′18″S 145°10′31″E	1991
Fort Lytton National Park	27°24′44″S 153°09′00″E	1990
Forty Mile Scrub National Park	18°05′22″S 144°51′43″E	1970
Frankland Group National Park	17°09′49″S 146°00′42″E	1994
Girramay National Park	18°02′41″S 146°01′41″E	2007
Girraween National Park	28.7742°S 151.912°E	1932
Girringun National Park	18°05′00″S 145°35′56″E	1994
Glass House Mountains National Park	26°50′51″S 152°57′14″E	1994
Gloucester Island National Park	20°00′55″S 148°27′18″E	1994
Goold Island National Park	18°10′01″S 146°10′16″E	1936
Goneaway National Park	23°46′02″S 142°13′47″E	1994
Goodedulla National Park	23°15′15″S 149°45′29″E	1994
Goodnight Scrub National Park	25°13′19″S 151°55′12″E	2005
Great Basalt Wall National Park	19°52′52″S 145°43′17″E	1987
Great Sandy National Park	25°02′42″S 153°12′35″E	1971
Green Island National Park	16°45′35″S 145°58′28″E	1937
Grey Peaks National Park	17°02′32″S 145°50′52″E	1971
Halifax Bay Wetlands National Park	18°52′03″S 146°16′08″E	1994
Hann Tableland National Park	16°47′54″S 145°09′04″E	1989
Hasties Swamp National Park	17°18′01″S 145°28′27″E	1980
Hell Hole Gorge National Park	25°32′15″S 144°09′17″E	1992
Herberton Range National Park	17°21′55″S 145°28′05″E	2008
Hinchinbrook Island National Park	18°22′55″S 146°14′49″E	1932
Holbourne Island National Park	19°43′37″S 148°21′36″E	1982
Homevale National Park	21°21′25″S 148°28′18″E	1995
Hope Islands National Park	15°43′53″S 145°27′26″E	1939
Hull River National Park	17°57′22″S 146°04′12″E	1968
Humboldt National Park	24°14′31″S 148°55′59″E	2009
Idalia National Park	24°57′31″S 144°41′49″E	1990
Isla Gorge National Park	25°10′10″S 149°56′42″E	1964
Japoon National Park	17°44′23″S 145°53′14″E	1992
Kalkajaka National Park	15°40′05″S 145°13′55″E	1967
Kirrama National Park		2006
Kondalilla National Park	26°40′05″S 152°51′30″E	1945
Kroombit Tops National Park	24°24′03″S 150°57′30″E	1974
KULLA (McIlwraith Range) National Park	13°54′00″S 143°20′32″E	2008
Kuranda National Park	17°00′35″S 145°37′00″E	1989
Kurrimine Beach National Park	17°43′56″S 146°05′44″E	1977
Kutini-Payamu National Park	12°39′35″S 143°20′53″E	1977
Lake Bindegolly National Park	28°00′48″S 144°11′37″E	1991
Lama Lama National Park	14°25′08″S 143°41′05″E	2008
Lamington National Park	28°08′32″S 153°06′54″E	1915
Lindeman Islands National Park	20°28′30″S 149°05′13″E	1941
Littabella National Park	24°34′45″S 152°02′53″E	1980
Lizard Island National Park	14°40′08″S 145°27′34″E	1939
Lochern National Park	24°14′14″S 143°19′33″E	1994
Lockyer National Park	27°26′23″S 152°14′35″E	2008
Macalister Range National Park	16°41′42″S 145°34′24″E	2010
Magnetic Island National Park	19°08′09″S 146°50′32″E	1954
Main Range National Park	27°48′57″S 152°15′58″E	1965
Malaan National Park	17°34′05″S 145°33′11″E	2005
Mapleton Falls National Park	26°37′50″S 152°50′20″E	1973
Maria Creek National Park	17°46′50″S 146°04′07″E	1972
Mariala National Park	26°01′46″S 145°04′17″E	1992
Marpa National Park	14°13′34″S 143°47′35″E	1989
Mazeppa National Park	22°13′54″S 147°17′28″E	1972
Melsonby (Gaarraay) National Park	15°04′01″S 145°07′29″E	2006
Michaelmas and Upolu Cays National Park	16°36′30″S 145°58′21″E	1975
Millstream Falls National Park	17°38′11″S 145°27′33″E	1909
Minerva Hills National Park	24°04′50″S 148°03′51″E	1994
Mitirinchi Island National Park	12°24′21″S 143°29′17″E	1989
Molle Islands National Park	20°22′36″S 148°51′27″E	1937
Moorrinya National Park	21°23′39″S 144°56′28″E	1993
Moresby Range National Park	17°32′15″S 146°04′33″E	1973
Moreton Island National Park	27°03′09″S 153°23′28″E	
Mount Archer National Park	23°19′31″S 150°34′55″E	1994
Mount Barney National Park	28°16′25″S 152°39′43″E	1947
Mount Bauple National Park	25°48′49″S 152°34′24″E	1935
Mount Binga National Park		2006
Mount Colosseum National Park	24°24′33″S 151°35′02″E	1977
Mount Cook National Park, Australia	15°29′34″S 145°15′33″E	1970
Mount Hypipamee National Park	17°25′30″S 145°29′10″E	1939
Mount Lewis National Park		2009
Mount Mackay National Park	17°56′46″S 145°58′28″E	2005
Mount Spurgeon National Park	16°26′57″S 145°12′17″E	2008
Mount Windsor National Park	16°16′23″S 145°00′11″E	2005
Munga-Thirri National Park	25°08′33″S 138°14′24″E	1967
Muundhi National Park	14°56′56″S 144°40′51″E	2005
Narkoola National Park		2010
Narrien Range National Park	22°53′53″S 146°56′27″E	1991
Nerang National Park	27°58′20″S 153°18′11″E	2009
Newry Islands National Park	20°51′06″S 148°53′58″E	1938
Nicoll Scrub National Park	28°11′22″S 153°25′26″E	1986
Noosa National Park	26°23′04″S 153°06′46″E	1939
North East Island National Park	21°39′57″S 150°20′11″E	1936
Northumberland Islands National Park	21°19′02″S 149°40′50″E	1994
Nuga Nuga National Park	24°57′55″S 148°41′04″E	1993
Nymph Island National Park	14°39′20″S 145°15′03″E	1980
Orpheus Island National Park	18°37′06″S 146°29′37″E	1960
Oyala Thumotang National Park	13°28′54″S 142°16′41″E	1994
Palmerston Rocks National Park	17°34′12″S 145°53′53″E	1967
Paluma Range National Park	18°52′18″S 146°07′30″E	1994
Peak Range National Park	22°28′54″S 147°52′37″E	1983
Pipeclay National Park	25°59′04″S 153°00′20″E	1963
Piper Islands National Park	12°13′10″S 143°15′49″E	1989
Poona National Park	25°35′20″S 152°49′22″E	1991
Porcupine Gorge National Park	20°23′57″S 144°26′25″E	1970
Possession Island	10°43′36″S 142°23′49″E	1977
Possession Island National Park		
Precipice National Park	13°21′59″S 143°57′12″E	1989
Ravensbourne National Park	27°21′24″S 152°12′06″E	1922
Repulse Island National Park	20°36′00″S 148°52′34″E	1994
Rinyirru National Park	14°32′42″S 144°06′58″E	1979
Rocky Islets National Park	14°51′32″S 145°28′40″E	1939
Round Top Island National Park	21°10′31″S 149°15′53″E	1998
Rundle Range National Park	23°39′38″S 150°58′24″E	1993
Russell River National Park	17°13′29″S 145°56′20″E	1969
Sandbanks National Park	13°21′59″S 143°57′12″E	1989
Sarabah National Park	28°02′48″S 153°07′23″E	1973
Saunders Islands National Park	11°42′12″S 143°10′47″E	1989
Sir Charles Hardy Group National Park	11°54′16″S 143°27′38″E	1989
Smith Islands National Park	20°35′21″S 149°06′38″E	1994
Snake Range National Park	24°02′35″S 147°35′01″E	1972
South Cumberland Islands National Park	20°44′28″S 149°28′25″E	1994
Southern Moreton Bay Islands National Park	27°43′05″S 153°23′04″E	2000
Southwood National Park	27°48′53″S 150°08′08″E	1970
Springbrook National Park	28°08′24″S 153°16′27″E	1990
St Helena Island National Park	27°23′36″S 153°13′54″E	1979
Starcke National Park	14°56′28″S 145°02′02″E	1977
Sundown National Park	28°52′06″S 151°37′07″E	1977
Swain Reefs National Park	21°14′22″S 151°50′48″E	1995
Tamborine National Park	27°51′37″S 153°10′42″E	1993
Tarong National Park	26°48′42″S 151°51′43″E	1995
Taunton National Park	23°32′00″S 149°13′17″E	1994
The Palms National Park	26°56′05″S 151°52′43″E	1950
Three Islands National Park	15°06′46″S 145°25′13″E	1939
Thrushton National Park	27°45′50″S 147°40′00″E	1990
Topaz Road National Park	17°24′00″S 145°41′59″E	1977
Triunia National Park	26°39′21″S 152°54′12″E	1994
Tully Falls National Park	17°46′36″S 145°33′36″E	2005
Tully Gorge National Park	17°35′30″S 145°34′05″E	1923
Turtle Group National Park	14°42′17″S 145°12′11″E	1939
Undara Volcanic National Park	18°12′04″S 144°35′46″E	1993
Venman Bushland National Park	27°37′39″S 153°12′01″E	1995
Welford National Park	25°03′31″S 143°26′02″E	1992
West Hill National Park	21°49′49″S 149°29′10″E	1971
White Mountains National Park	20°32′28″S 144°58′00″E	1990
Whitsunday Islands National Park	20°03′37″S 148°52′27″E	1944
Wondul Range National Park	28°03′48″S 151°01′19″E	1992
Wooroonooran National Park	17°08′47″S 145°47′35″E	1991
Wuthara Island National Park	12°17′10″S 143°24′40″E	1990
Yamarrinh Wachangan Islands National Park	11°06′32″S 143°00′57″E	1989
Yungaburra National Park	17°17′16″S 145°34′15″E	1953

== South Australia ==
Parks in this area are managed by the National Parks and Wildlife Service South Australia.

Name	Coordinates	Date of establishment
Adelaide International Bird Sanctuary National Park—Winaityinaityi Pangkara	34°35′38″S 138°23′53″E	2016
Belair National Park	35°00′47″S 138°39′21″E	1891
Canunda National Park	37°42′56″S 140°16′59″E	1959
Cleland National Park	34°58′03″S 138°41′45″E	2021
Coffin Bay National Park	34°34′56″S 135°19′19″E	1982
Coorong National Park	36°02′57″S 139°33′13″E	1967
Deep Creek National Park	35°37′40″S 138°13′19″E	2021
Flinders Chase National Park	35°58′38″S 136°40′23″E	1919
Gawler Ranges National Park	32°33′14″S 135°27′50″E	2002
Great Australian Bight Marine National Park	31°54′54″S 131°26′26″E	1996
Ikara-Flinders Ranges National Park	31°25′20″S 138°42′18″E	1945
Innes National Park	35°13′40″S 136°53′42″E	1970
Kati Thanda-Lake Eyre National Park	28.6689°S 137.524°E	1985
Lake Frome National Park	30°43′51.85″S 139°48′39.46″E	2021
Lake Gairdner National Park	31°41′50″S 135°51′14″E	1991
Glenthorne National Park–Ityamaiitpinna Yarta		2020
Lake Torrens National Park	31°02′40″S 137°51′35″E	1991
Lincoln National Park	34°52′04″S 135°52′12″E	1941
Malkumba-Coongie Lakes National Park	27.2614°S 140.157°E	2005
Mount Remarkable National Park	32°46′53″S 138°03′46″E	1952
Munga-Thirri–Simpson Desert National Park	26°14′46″S 137°52′23″E	2021
Murray River National Park	34°23′13″S 140°32′24″E	1991
Naracoorte Caves National Park	36°57′S 140°45′E	1994
Nilpena Ediacara National Park		2021
Nullarbor National Park	31°23′55″S 130°08′16″E	1979
Onkaparinga River National Park	35°09′38″S 138°33′14″E	1993
Vulkathunha-Gammon Ranges National Park	30°26′50″S 139°16′37″E	1970
Wapma Thura–Southern Flinders Ranges National Park		2021
Witjira National Park	26°22′18″S 135°37′48″E	1985

== Tasmania ==
Parks in this area are managed by the Tasmania Parks and Wildlife Service

Name	Coordinates	Date of establishment
Ben Lomond National Park	41°33′S 147°40′E	1947
Cradle Mountain-Lake St Clair National Park	41.83°S 145.92°E	1922
Douglas-Apsley National Park	41°46′S 148°12′E	1989
Franklin-Gordon Wild Rivers National Park	42°25′S 146°02′E	1908
Freycinet National Park	42°03′S 148°17′E	1916
Hartz Mountains National Park	43°14′S 146°46′E	1939
Kent Group National Park	39°28′S 147°19′E	1947
Maria Island National Park	42°38′S 148°06′E	1972
Mole Creek Karst National Park	41°36′S 146°17′E	1996
Mount Field National Park	42°40′S 146°35′E	1916
Mount William National Park	40°56′S 148°15′E	1973
Narawntapu National Park	41°08′S 146°40′E	1976
Rocky Cape National Park	40°54′S 145°32′E	1967
Savage River National Park	41°21′S 145°25′E	1999
South Bruny National Park	43°21′S 147°22′E	1997
Southwest National Park	42°50′S 146°09′E	1955
Strzelecki National Park	40°13′S 148°05′E	1967
Tasman National Park	42°52′S 147°59′E	1999
Walls of Jerusalem National Park	41°52′S 146°16′E	1978

== Victoria ==
Parks in this area are managed by Parks Victoria.

Name	Coordinates	Date of establishment
Alfred National Park	37°34′17″S 149°21′37″E	1925
Alpine National Park	37°20′15″S 146°45′25″E	1989
Barmah National Park	35°52′00″S 145°07′05″E	2010
Baw Baw National Park	37°45′50″S 146°13′23″E	1979
Brisbane Ranges National Park	37°47′43″S 144°16′44″E	1973
Budj Bim National Park	38°04′44″S 141°53′19″E	1960
Bunurong Marine National Park	38°41′28″S 145°39′22″E	
Burrowa-Pine Mountain National Park	36°05′24″S 147°45′29″E	1978
Cape Howe Marine National Park	37°32′00″S 149°57′00″E	
Chiltern-Mount Pilot National Park	36°07′59″S 146°36′04″E	2002
Churchill Island Marine National Park	38°29′53″S 145°19′01″E	
Churchill National Park	37°57′05″S 145°15′36″E	1941
Cobboboonee National Park	38°07′35″S 141°26′46″E	2008
Coopracambra National Park	37°18′41″S 149°13′12″E	1988
Corner Inlet Marine National Park	38°46′00″S 146°20′00″E	
Croajingolong National Park	37°37′00″S 149°28′00″E	1979
Dandenong Ranges National Park	37°48′37″S 145°23′10″E	1987
Discovery Bay Marine National Park	38°21′00″S 141°22′00″E	
Errinundra National Park	37°17′09″S 148°53′42″E	1988
French Island National Park	38°19′51″S 145°23′17″E	1998
Grampians National Park	37°12′28″S 142°24′00″E	1984
Great Otway National Park	38°46′24″S 143°33′25″E	2005
Greater Bendigo National Park	36°40′26″S 144°15′18″E	2002
Gunbower National Park	35°41′45″S 144°11′38″E	2010
Hattah-Kulkyne National Park	34°41′14″S 142°22′55″E	1960
Heathcote-Graytown National Park	36°47′47″S 144°51′58″E	2002
Kara Kara National Park	36°51′38″S 143°17′06″E	2002
Kinglake National Park	37°24′23″S 145°12′40″E	1928
Lake Eildon National Park	37°07′46″S 145°52′08″E	1997
Lind National Park	37°34′14″S 148°57′36″E	1925
Little Desert National Park	36°36′24″S 141°11′20″E	1968
Lower Glenelg National Park	38°03′58″S 141°17′20″E	1969
Lower Goulburn National Park	36°10′54″S 145°07′12″E	2010
Mitchell River National Park	37°39′20″S 147°20′46″E	1986
Mornington Peninsula National Park	38°30′08″S 144°53′18″E	1988
Morwell National Park	38°21′59″S 146°23′28″E	1967
Mount Buffalo National Park	36°44′18″S 146°46′30″E	1898
Mount Richmond National Park	38°16′13″S 141°25′30″E	1960
Murray-Sunset National Park	34°46′35″S 141°29′02″E	1991
Ninety Mile Beach Marine National Park	38°25′00″S 147°11′00″E	
Organ Pipes National Park	37°40′07″S 144°46′01″E	1972
Point Addis Marine National Park	38°25′00″S 144°14′00″E	
Point Hicks Marine National Park	37°48′S 149°15′E	
Point Nepean National Park	38°18′56″S 144°41′00″E	2005
Port Campbell National Park	38°39′01″S 143°03′45″E	1964
Snowy River National Park	37°16′30″S 148°33′11″E	1979
Tarra-Bulga National Park	38°26′30″S 146°34′48″E	1986
Terrick Terrick National Park	36°08′34″S 144°13′42″E	1999
The Lakes National Park	37°58′13″S 147°44′31″E	1927
Twelve Apostles Marine National Park	38°40′00″S 143°06′00″E	
Warby-Ovens National Park	36°19′47″S 146°11′17″E	2010
Wilsons Promontory Marine National Park	39°10′00″S 146°19′59″E	
Wilsons Promontory National Park	39°00′48″S 146°23′38″E	1898
Wyperfeld National Park	35°23′21″S 141°52′37″E	1921
Yarra Ranges National Park	37°40′50″S 145°59′28″E	1995

== Western Australia ==
Parks in this area are managed by the Department of Biodiversity, Conservation & Attractions:

Name	Date of establishment	Coordinates
Alexander Morrison National Park	23 May 1969	30.0493°S 115.5834°E
Avon Valley National Park	7 August 1970	31.6093°S 116.2272°E
Badgingarra National Park	16 February 1973	30.4351°S 115.4115°E
Beelu National Park	30 November 2004	31.9444°S 116.1478°E
Blackwood River National Park	30 November 2004	34.0941°S 115.3044°E
Boorabbin National Park	11 November 1977	31.2549°S 120.1706°E
Boorara-Gardner National Park	8 December 2004	34.7586°S 116.224°E
Boyndaminup National Park	8 December 2004	34.5136°S 116.5705°E
Brockman National Park	28 January 1927	34.5114°S 115.9996°E
Bunuba National Park	August 2023	17.9347°S 125.8718°E
Cape Arid National Park	22 October 1954	33.5451°S 123.3843°E
Cape Le Grand National Park	21 May 1948	33.9541°S 122.205°E
Cape Range National Park	9 October 1964	22.139°S 113.934°E
Cape Range (South) National Park	4 November 2020	22.5886°S 113.7251°E
Collier Range National Park	20 January 1978	24.7529°S 119.1346°E
D'Entrecasteaux National Park	28 November 1980	34.8737°S 116.3333°E
Dalgarup National Park	8 December 2004	33.9803°S 115.9843°E
Dirk Hartog Island National Park	28 October 2009	25.7943°S 113.0539°E
Drovers Cave National Park	19 May 1972	30.2305°S 115.0998°E
Dryandra Woodland National Park	17 January 2022	32.7833°S 116.9670°E
Drysdale River National Park	27 September 1974	14.9369°S 127.0777°E
Easter National Park	8 December 2004	34.2468°S 115.7951°E
Eucla National Park	12 October 1979	31.6826°S 128.9578°E
Fitzgerald River National Park	19 January 1973	33.9874°S 119.5263°E
Forest Grove National Park	8 December 2004	34.0965°S 115.135°E
Francois Peron National Park	8 January 1993	25.7286°S 113.5351°E
Frank Hann National Park	6 December 1963	32.8922°S 120.3278°E
Geikie Gorge National Park	20 January 1967	18.0702°S 125.7124°E
Gloucester National Park	29 January 1993	34.44°S 116.0755°E
Goldfields Woodlands National Park	14 April 2000	31.2441°S 120.5632°E
Goongarrie National Park	20 October 1978	29.9717°S 121.5097°E
Gooseberry Hill National Park	13 February 1970	31.9413°S 116.0469°E
Greater Beedelup National Park	8 December 2004	34.3747°S 115.8708°E
Greater Dordagup National Park	8 December 2004	34.5126°S 116.2694°E
Greater Hawke National Park	8 December 2004	34.5075°S 115.8704°E
Greater Kingston National Park	8 December 2004	34.0578°S 116.3631°E
Greater Preston National Park	8 December 2004	33.5887°S 116.1246°E
Greenmount National Park	24 April 1959	31.9109°S 116.0627°E
Gull Rock National Park	10 January 1964	35.003°S 118.0015°E
Hassell National Park	8 March 1963	34.6764°S 118.3293°E
Helena National Park	30 November 2004	32.155°S 116.3208°E
Hilliger National Park	30 November 2004	34.2259°S 115.694°E
Houtman Abrolhos Islands National Park	5 July 2019	28.4635°S 113.6975°E
Jane National Park	8 December 2004	34.5936°S 116.2454°E
John Forrest National Park	30 November 1900	31.8698°S 116.0862°E
Kalamunda National Park	7 December 1934	31.9597°S 116.076°E
Kalbarri National Park	22 November 1963	27.6396°S 114.4777°E
Karijini National Park	31 October 1969	22.5626°S 118.3375°E
Karlamilyi National Park	22 April 1977	22.3066°S 122.9112°E
Kennedy Range National Park	8 January 1993	24.5797°S 115.051°E
Korung National Park	30 November 2004	32.0695°S 116.1335°E
Lake Muir National Park	8 December 2004	34.5594°S 116.7248°E
Lakeside National Park	18 February 2021	27.6467°S 117.5152°E
Lawley River National Park	10 July 2000	14.6914°S 125.9061°E
Leeuwin-Naturaliste National Park	7 November 1902	34.1691°S 115.0505°E
Lesmurdie Falls National Park	1 February 1946	31.9952°S 116.0309°E
Lesueur National Park	24 January 1992	30.1326°S 115.1874°E
Matuwa Kurrara Kurrara National Park	5 May 2023	25°50′40″S 121°40′50″E
Midgegooroo National Park	30 November 2004	32.1294°S 116.1484°E
Millstream Chichester National Park	7 November 1969	21.4426°S 117.4841°E
Milyeannup National Park	30 November 2004	34.1554°S 115.6529°E
Mirima National Park	13 August 1982	15.7667°S 128.768°E
Mitchell River National Park	10 July 2000	14.9488°S 125.6096°E
Moore River National Park	10 March 1967	31.0849°S 115.6839°E
Mount Augustus National Park	22 September 1989	24.3329°S 116.8506°E
Mount Frankland National Park	23 December 1988	34.7946°S 116.8199°E
Mount Frankland North National Park	8 December 2004	34.6691°S 116.7037°E
Mount Frankland South National Park	8 December 2004	34.8507°S 116.5857°E
Mount Lindesay National Park	8 December 2004	34.813°S 117.3437°E
Mount Roe National Park	8 December 2004	34.7119°S 117.0209°E
Mungada Ridge National Park	17 January 2022	29.1434°S 116.9098°E
Murujuga National Park	17 January 2013	20.5652°S 116.8193°E
Nambung National Park	31 August 1956	30.5897°S 115.1573°E
Neerabup National Park	2 July 1965	31.6356°S 115.7182°E
Niiwalarra Islands National Park	4 December 2019	13.8900°S 126.5461°E
Peak Charles National Park	27 April 1979	32.9086°S 121.1083°E
Pimbee National Park	August 2023	25.5232°S 114.8718°E
Porongurup National Park	4 September 1925	34.684°S 117.8957°E
Prince Regent National Park	10 April 1964	15.5674°S 125.4685°E
Purnululu National Park	6 March 1987	17.5304°S 128.394°E
Scott National Park	17 July 1959	34.2423°S 115.2243°E
Serpentine National Park	29 March 1968	32.3958°S 116.0668°E
Shannon National Park	23 December 1988	34.7146°S 116.3858°E
Sir James Mitchell National Park	29 August 1924	34.3455°S 116.1461°E
Stirling Range National Park	6 June 1913	34.3903°S 117.8968°E
Stokes National Park	21 June 1974	33.8206°S 121.1984°E
Tathra National Park	23 May 1969	29.78°S 115.5306°E
Torndirrup National Park	9 September 1955	35.0981°S 117.871°E
Tuart Forest National Park	16 October 1987	33.6159°S 115.4647°E
Tunnel Creek National Park	19 July 1963	17.6107°S 125.144°E
Unnamed WA17519 National Park	3 September 1920	34.4728°S 115.9314°E
Unnamed WA46400 National Park	13 December 2000	34.1005°S 115.1788°E
Unnamed WA47688 National Park	26 July 2004	33.2006°S 116.2704°E
Unnamed WA53843 National Park	17 February 2021	34.3998°S 115.6528°E
Warlibirri National Park	22 September 2021	18.2572°S 126.3598°E
Walpole-Nornalup National Park	30 September 1910	34.9849°S 116.8721°E
Walyunga National Park	8 June 1893	31.721°S 116.0673°E
Wandoo National Park	30 November 2004	32.0671°S 116.4964°E
Warren National Park	15 March 1901	34.5045°S 115.9645°E
Watheroo National Park	8 July 1955	30.2093°S 115.8838°E
Waychinicup National Park	3 March 1961	34.894°S 118.3726°E
Wellington National Park	4 July 2000	33.3802°S 115.9589°E
West Cape Howe National Park	9 February 1962	35.0927°S 117.5972°E
Whicher National Park	8 December 2004	33.7836°S 115.4875°E
William Bay National Park	23 April 1909	35.0136°S 117.2449°E
Wiltshire-Butler National Park	30 November 2004	34.0371°S 115.4915°E
Windjana Gorge National Park	10 December 1971	17.4175°S 124.9774°E
Wolfe Creek Meteorite Crater National Park	15 November 1968	19.1723°S 127.7956°E
Wooditjup National Park	8 December 2004	33.9318°S 115.1221°E
Yalgorup National Park	5 February 1909	32.7527°S 115.6522°E
Yanchep National Park	25 August 1905	31.5368°S 115.6817°E
Yelverton National Park	8 December 2004	33.7475°S 115.0808°E

== External territories ==
Parks in the external territories are managed by the Director of National Parks

Name	Coordinates	Date of establishment
Christmas Island National Park	10°29′00″S 105°38′00″E	1980
Pulu Keeling National Park	11°50′00″S 96°49′00″E	1995-12-12
Booderee National Park and Botanic Gardens	35°09′03″S 150°38′43″E	1992
Norfolk Island National Park	29°04′00″S 167°56′00″E	1984

== See also ==
- Protected areas of Australia
