= Pterostylis stenosepala =

Narrow-sepalled leafy greenhood

Scientific classification
- Kingdom: Plantae
- Clade: Tracheophytes
- Clade: Angiosperms
- Clade: Monocots
- Order: Asparagales
- Family: Orchidaceae
- Subfamily: Orchidoideae
- Tribe: Cranichideae
- Genus: Pterostylis
- Species: P. stenosepala

Binomial name
- Pterostylis stenosepala (D.L.Jones) G.N.Backh.

Synonyms
- Bunochilus stenosepalus D.L.Jones

Species of orchid

Pterostylis stenosepala, commonly known as the narrow-sepalled leafy greenhood, is a plant in the orchid family Orchidaceae and is endemic to New South Wales. Flowering plants have up to six shiny, translucent green flowers with darker green stripes. The flowers have an insect-like labellum which is green with a dark green mound on its upper end. Non-flowering plants have a rosette of leaves on a stalk, but flowering plants lack the rosette, instead having between four and eight stem leaves.

== Description ==
Pterostylis stenosepala, is a terrestrial, perennial, deciduous, herb with an underground tuber. Non-flowering plants have a rosette of leaves 12–35 mm (0.5–1 in) long and 5–9 mm (0.2–0.4 in) wide on a stalk 20–40 mm (0.8–2 in) tall. Flowering plants have up to six shiny, translucent green flowers with darker green stripes on a flowering spike 100–350 mm (4–10 in) high. The flowering spike has between four and eight stem leaves which are 15–50 mm (0.6–2 in) long and 4–7 mm (0.2–0.3 in) wide. The dorsal sepal and petals are fused, forming a hood or "galea" over the column. The petals have a wide, transparent flange on their outer edges. The lateral sepals turn downwards, 12–14 mm (0.5–0.6 in) long, 5–6 mm (0.20–0.24 in) wide and joined for part of their length with greenish-yellow tips. The labellum is insect-like, 7–8 mm (0.28–0.31 in) long, about 3 mm (0.1 in) wide, with a dark green mound on the "head" end. Flowering occurs from August to October.

== Taxonomy and naming ==
This greenhood was first formally described in 2006 by David Jones and given the name Bunochilus stenosapalus. The description was published in Australian Orchid Research from a specimen collected in Conimbla National Park. In 2010, Gary Backhouse changed the name to Pterostylis stenosepala. The specific epithet (stenosepala) is derived from the Ancient Greek word stenos meaning "narrow" and the Neo-Latin word sepalum meaning "sepal", referring to the narrow lateral sepals.

== Distribution and habitat ==
The narrow-sepalled leafy greenhood grows in forest with grasses or shrubs near Orange and Cowra in the Central Tablelands and Central West Slopes.
