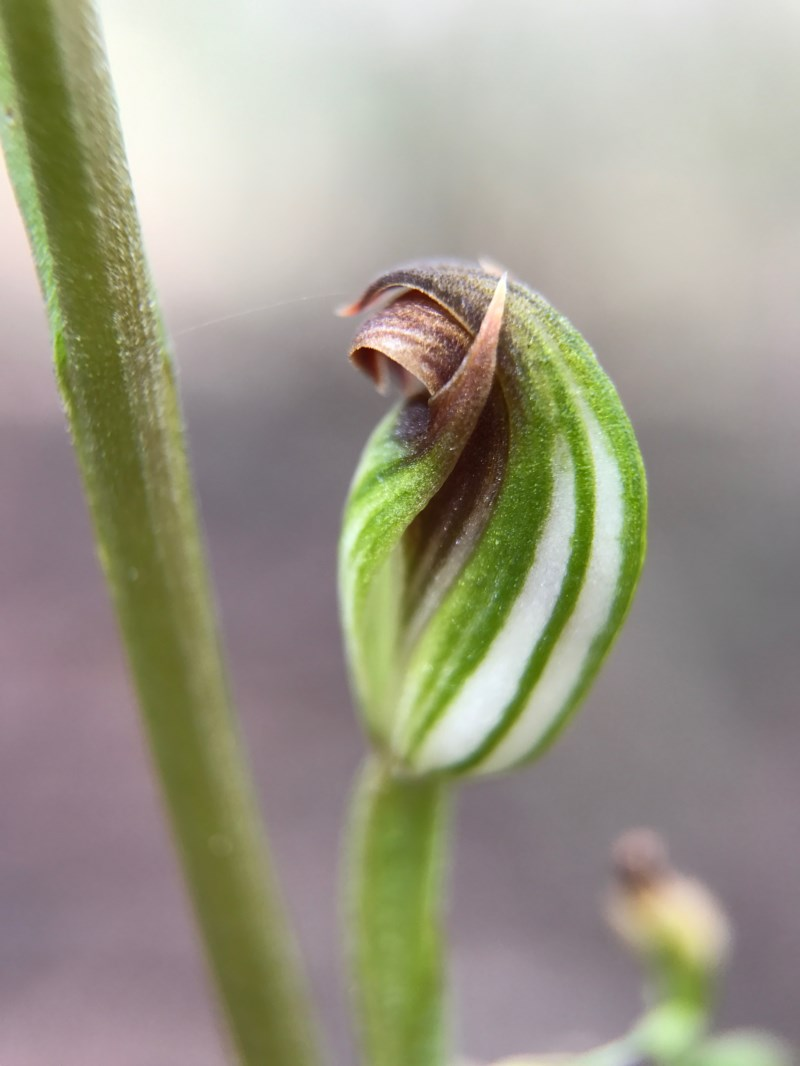
- Pterostylis rubescens growing near Canberra

Scientific classification
- Kingdom: Plantae
- Clade: Tracheophytes
- Clade: Angiosperms
- Clade: Monocots
- Order: Asparagales
- Family: Orchidaceae
- Subfamily: Orchidoideae
- Tribe: Cranichideae
- Genus: Pterostylis
- Species: P. rubescens

Binomial name
- Pterostylis rubescens R.Br.

Synonyms
- Speculantha parviflora (R.Br.) D.L.Jones & M.A.Clem.

= Pterostylis rubescens =

Blushing tiny greenhood

Species of orchid

Pterostylis rubescens, commonly known as the blushing tiny greenhood, is a species of orchid endemic to south-eastern Australia. As with similar orchids, the flowering plants differ from those which are not flowering. The non-flowering plants have a rosette of leaves but the flowering plants lack a rosette at the base and have up to eighteen tiny green, white and brownish flowers.

== Description ==
Pterostylis rubescens is a terrestrial, perennial, deciduous, herb with an underground tuber and when not flowering, a rosette of between five and fifteen egg-shaped to heart-shaped leaves which lie flat on the ground. Each leaf is 6–25 mm (0.2–1 in) long and 3–18 mm (0.1–0.7 in) wide. Flowering plants have between three and eighteen well-spaced flowers 10–18 mm (0.4–0.7 in) long are borne on a thin, wiry spike 150–600 mm (6–20 in) high. Three to six leaves are wrapped around the flowering spike. The flowers are almost spherical, green and white near the base, brownish near the tip and age to pinkish. The dorsal sepal and petals are fused, forming a hood or "galea" over the column. The dorsal sepal curves forward near the top and has a rough tip. The lateral sepals are erect and held closely against the galea with narrow tips about 2 mm (0.08 in) long that do not project above the galea. The sinus between the bases of the lateral sepals bulges forward and has a small notch in the centre. The labellum is about 4 mm (0.2 in) long, 2 mm (0.08 in) wide and is not visible above the sinus. Flowering occurs from January to May.

== Taxonomy and naming ==
The blushing tiny greenhood was first formally described in 2008 by David Jones who gave it the name Speculantha rubescens. The description was published in The Orchadian from a specimen collected in the Conimbla National Park. In 2010 Gary Backhouse changed the name to Pterostylis rubescens. The specific epithet (rubescens) is derived from the Latin word ruber meaning "red" or "reddish" with the suffix -escens meaning "becoming".

== Distribution and habitat ==
Pterostylis rubescens grows on slopes and ridges in open forest and woodland. It is widespread in northern Victoria and on the central and southern tablelands of New South Wales.
