= Jindalee National Park =

Protected area in New South Wales, Australia

- IUCN category II (national park)
- Location within New South Wales
- Location: New South Wales
- Nearest city: Cootamundra
- Coordinates: 34°30′43.9″S 148°02′08.5″E
- Area: 10.76 km^{2} (4.15 sq mi)
- Established: 1 January 2011
- Governing body: NSW National Parks and Wildlife Service
- Website: www.nationalparks.nsw.gov.au/visit-a-park/parks/jindalee-national-park

The Jindalee National Park is a protected national park that is located 10 kilometres (6.2 mi) north of Cootamundra, in the South West Slopes region of New South Wales, Australia. The northern boundary of the park runs adjacent to the Burley Griffin Way.

== History ==
Jindalee National Park was initially declared a forest reserve in 1877 and in August 1918 it was reclassified as a state forest. In January 2011, the park was reserved under the National Park Estate (South-Western Cypress Reservations) Act (2010) to protect remaining areas of cypress pine woodlands, which have been extensively cleared across New South Wales.

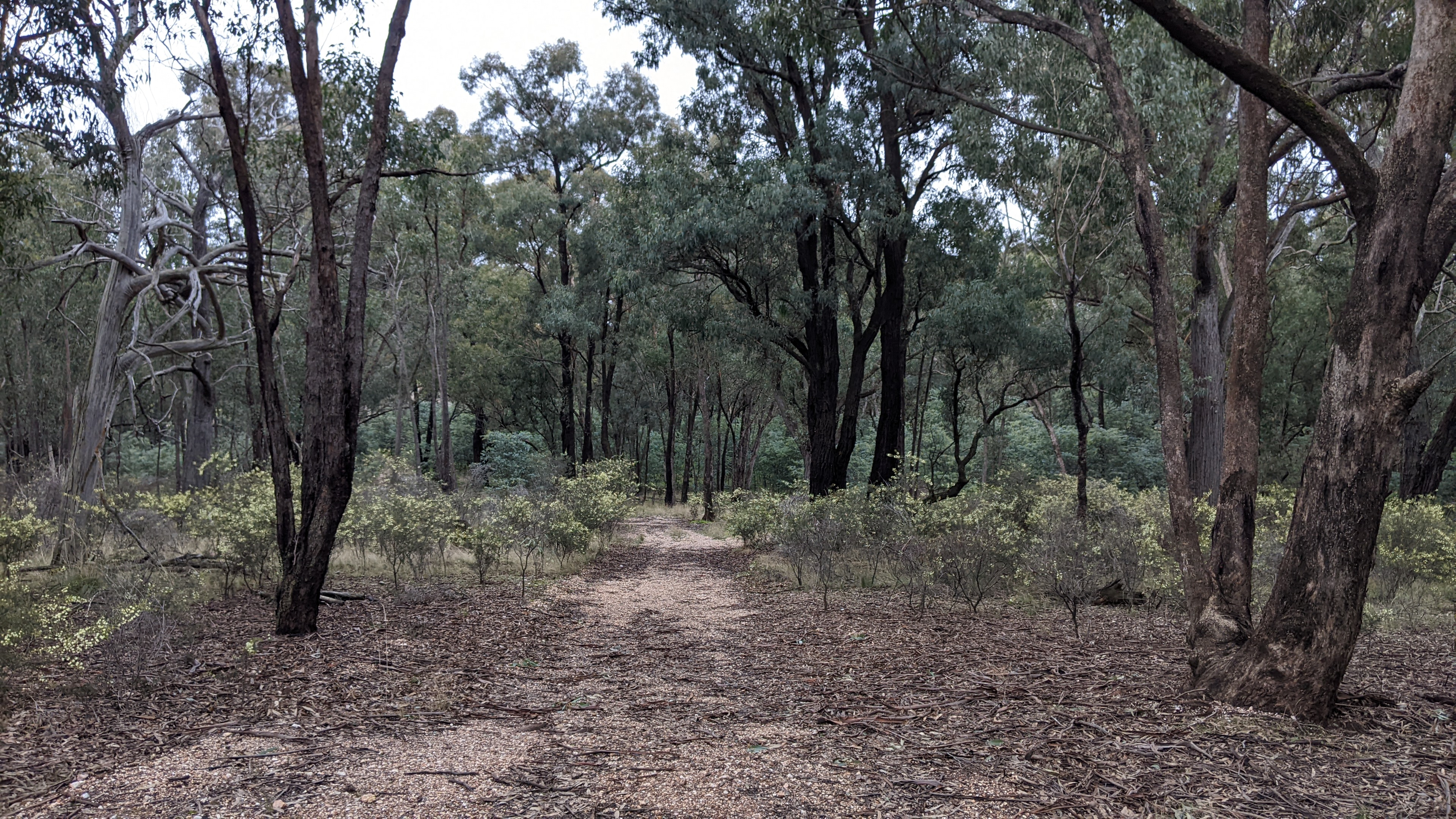
Box-ironbark forest, Jindalee National Park

== Features ==
The park is divided into two portions by a strip of private farmland along Berthong Road. It is characterised by undulating country, dissected by numerous minor drainage lines. The state forest had a long history of recreational activity, particularly motorbike use and in later years some mountain bike use. Following reservation, all of the existing roads within the park remained open to public vehicle access, however all vehicles are required to be registered and their use confined to the existing formed trails only.

== Flora ==
The park consists of several vegetation communities. Mugga ironbark-mixed box woodland makes up 74 percent of the park, 20 percent is mugga ironbark-western grey box-Cypress pine woodland, and 5.8 percent of the park is cleared land. 0.2 percent of the park is white box-yellow box-Blakely’s red gum grassy woodland, an ecological community classified as Critically Endangered in NSW. The pine donkey orchid, listed as Vulnerable in NSW under the Biodiversity Conservation Act 2016, occurs within Jindalee National Park.

Invasive plants found in the park include St. John's wort, Paterson's curse, viper's bugloss, blackberry, apple of Sodom, thistles and capeweed.

== Fauna ==
Threatened birds recorded in the park include swift parrot, regent honeyeater, little lorikeet, brown treecreeper, speckled warbler, black-chinned honeyeater, varied sittella, flame robin, diamond firetail, grey-crowned babbler, hooded robin, little eagle, turquoise parrot and painted honeyeater. Other birds found in the reserve include white-throated treecreeper and yellow-rumped thornbill.

Threatened mammals recorded in the park include squirrel glider and eastern pygmy possum.

Several introduced pest species occur, including the European fox, feral cat and various deer species.

== Issues ==
Illegal firewood collection and illegal off-road motorcycle and four-wheel drive vehicle use occur within Jindalee National Park.

== See also ==
- Protected areas of New South Wales
- List of national parks of Australia
