= Woolly ragwort =

Woolly ragwort is a common name for several plants and may refer to:

- Packera dubia, syn. Packera tomentosa, native to eastern North America
- Senecio garlandii, native to southeastern Australia
- Senecio falklandicus, native to the Falkland Islands
