= Saunders Island =

Saunders Island may refer to:

- Saunders Island (Greenland), northwestern Greenland, on the 70th meridian west
- Saunders Island (Falkland Islands)
- Saunders Island (South Sandwich Islands)

== See also ==
- Saunders Islands National Park, Queensland, Australia
- Saunders Islet, Queensland, Australia
- Saunders (disambiguation)
