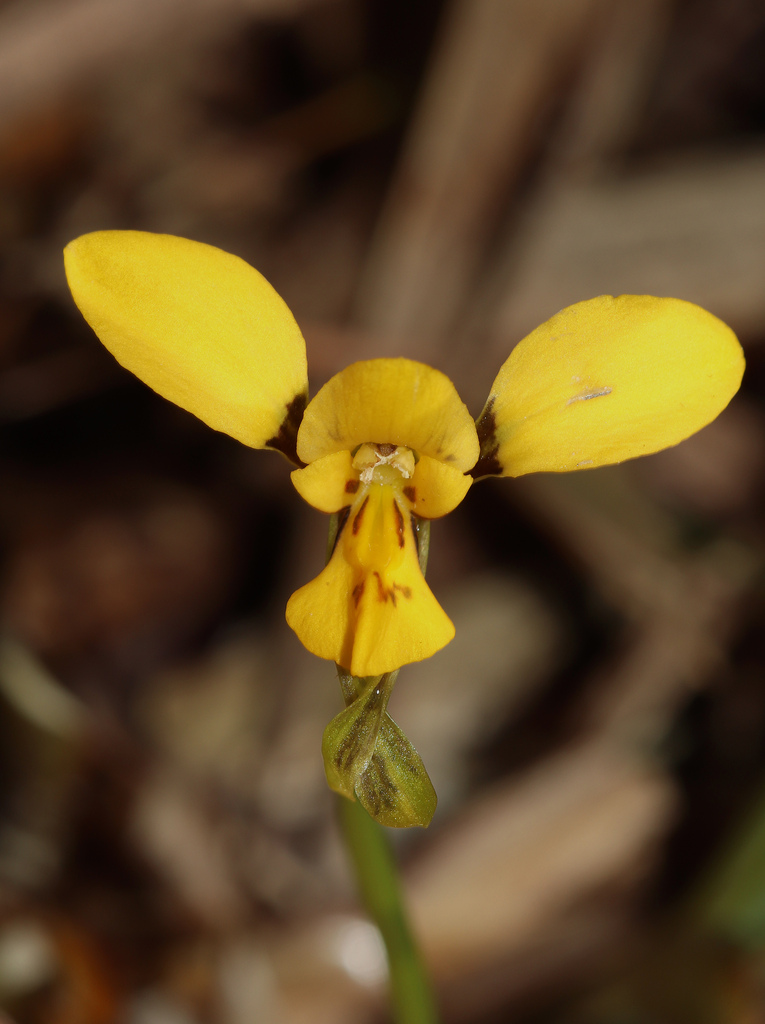

Conservation status
- Critically Endangered (IUCN 3.1)

Scientific classification
- Kingdom: Plantae
- Clade: Tracheophytes
- Clade: Angiosperms
- Clade: Monocots
- Order: Asparagales
- Family: Orchidaceae
- Subfamily: Orchidoideae
- Tribe: Diurideae
- Genus: Diuris
- Species: D. byronensis

Binomial name
- Diuris byronensis D.L.Jones

= Diuris byronensis =

Byron Bay donkey orchid

Species of orchid

Diuris byronensis, commonly known as the Byron Bay donkey orchid, is a species of orchid that is endemic to the Arakwal National Park in New South Wales. It has one or two grass-like leaves and up to five bright yellow flowers with blackish markings. It has a very limited distribution near Byron Bay.

== Description ==
Diuris byronensis is a tuberous, perennial herb with one or two leaves 100–250 mm (4–10 in) long, 2–4 mm (0.08–0.2 in) wide and folded lengthwise. Between two and five bright yellow flowers with blackish markings, 20–30 mm (0.8–1 in) wide are borne on a flowering stem 100–300 mm (4–10 in) tall. The dorsal sepal is more or less erect, 9–12 mm (0.4–0.5 in) long and 6–7 mm (0.2–0.3 in) wide. The lateral sepals are 20–34 mm (0.8–1 in) long, 1.5–2 mm (0.06–0.08 in) wide and turned downwards. The petals are held horizontally, often turned backwards with an elliptic blade 9–13 mm (0.4–0.5 in) long and 5–8 mm (0.2–0.3 in) wide on a brown stalk 4–6 mm (0.16–0.24 in) long. The labellum is 10–15 mm (0.4–0.6 in) long and has three lobes. The centre lobe is egg-shaped, 9–12 mm (0.4–0.5 in) long and 6–8 mm (0.2–0.3 in) wide and the side lobes are 1.5–2.5 mm (0.06–0.1 in) long and less than 1 mm (0.04 in) wide. There are two ridge-shaped calli 3 mm (0.1 in) long at the base of the mid-line of the labellum. Flowering occurs in August and September.

== Taxonomy and naming ==
Diuris byronensis was first formally described in 2003 by David Jones from a specimen collected near Byron Bay and the description was published in The Orchadian.

== Distribution and habitat ==
The Byron Bay donkey orchid is only known from a small part of the Arakwal National Park where it grows with sedges and grasses in a rare type of heath known as Byron Bay Dwarf Graminoid Clay Heath.

== Conservation ==
Diuris byronensis is classed as "critically endangered" in the IUCN Red List of Threatened Species and as "endangered" under the New South Wales Biodiversity Conservation Act. The main threats to the species are its limited geographic range, loss of habitat and weed invasion. Projects are underway to protect the habitat of this orchid and other threatened species.
