= Gunbower National Park =

National park in Victoria, Australia

- IUCN category II (national park)
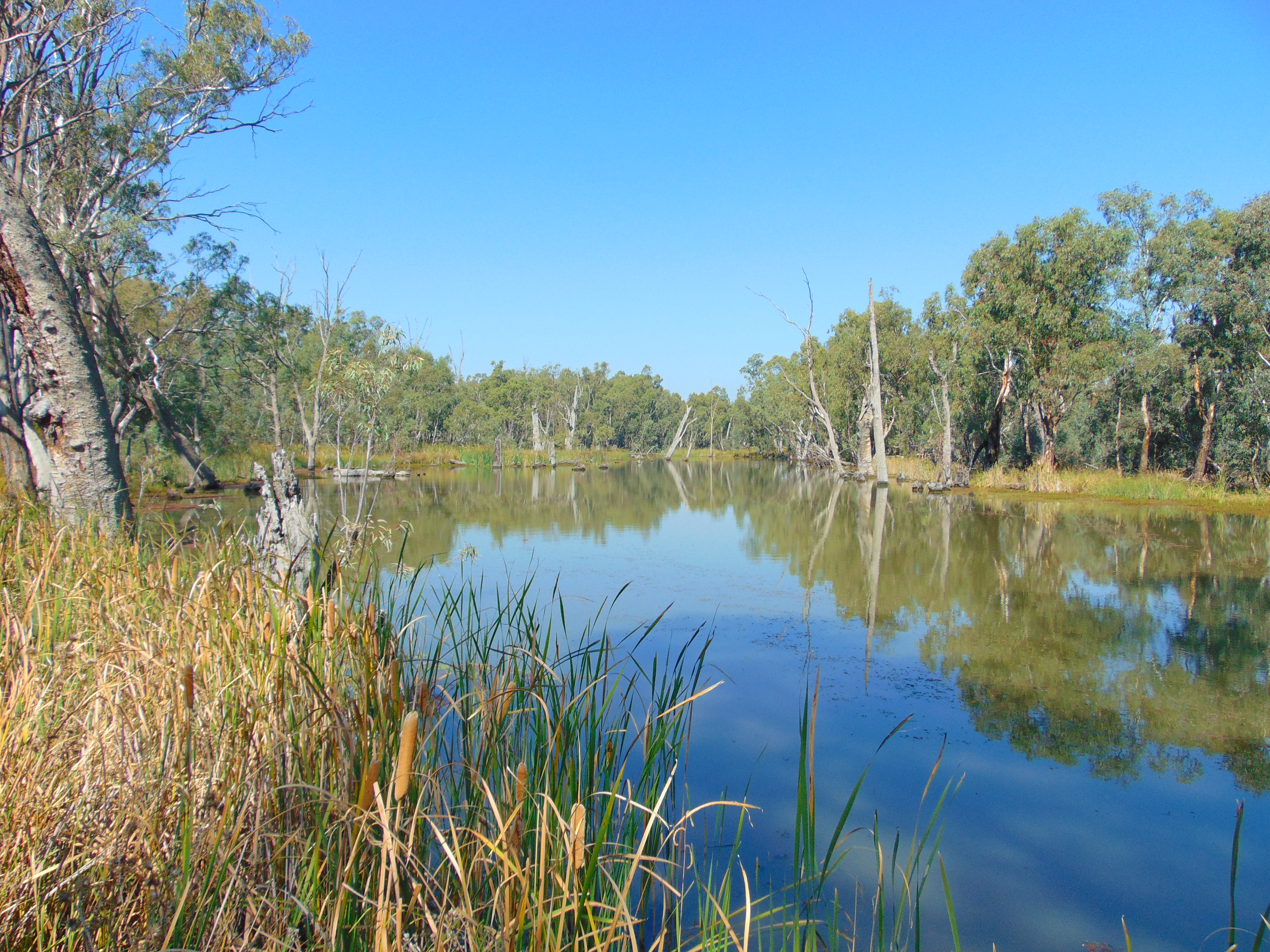

- Location within Victoria
- Location: Victoria
- Nearest city: Cohuna
- Coordinates: 35°41′45″S 144°11′39″E
- Area: 93.3 km^{2} (36.0 sq mi)
- Established: June 2010
- Governing body: Parks Victoria
- Website: Official website

Ramsar Wetland
- Official name: Gunbower Forest
- Designated: 15 December 1982
- Reference no.: 263

The Gunbower National Park is a national park located in the Loddon Mallee region of Victoria, Australia. The 9,330-hectare (23,100-acre) national park is situated between Echuca and Koondrook adjacent to the banks of the Murray River, approximately 250 kilometres (160 mi) north of Melbourne and was established in June 2010. The park contains the Gunbower Forest Ramsar wetlands site for the protection of migratory bird species.

== See also ==
- Protected areas of Victoria
- List of national parks of Australia
