= Point Addis Marine National Park =

Marine national park in Victoria, Australia

- IUCN category II (national park)
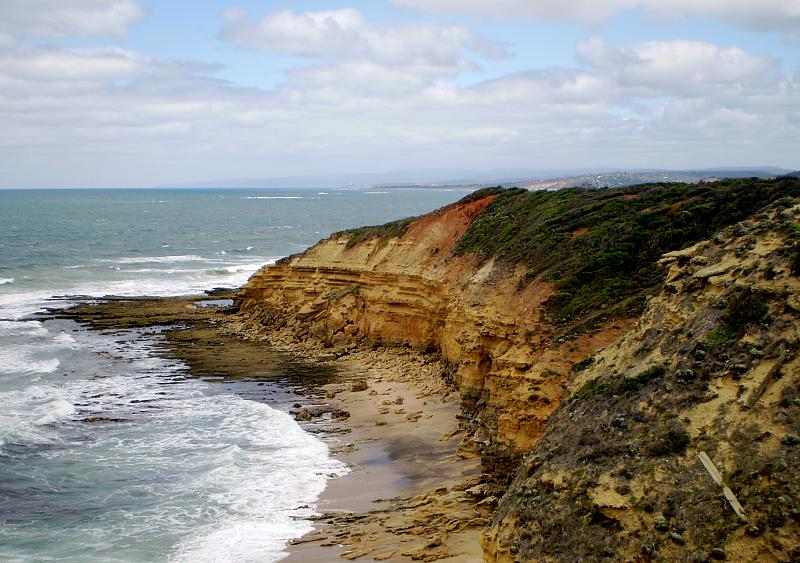
- Point Addis Marine National Park, 2008

- Location within Victoria
- Location: Victoria
- Coordinates: 38°25′S 144°14′E
- Area: 46 km^{2} (18 sq mi)
- Established: 16 November 2002
- Governing body: Parks Victoria
- Website: Official website

The Point Addis Marine National Park is a protected marine national park located near Anglesea on the Surf Coast region of Victoria, Australia. The 4,600-hectare (11,000-acre) marine park extends along 10 kilometres (6.2 mi) of coastline east of Anglesea, around Point Addis to the eastern end of Bells Beach and offshore 3 nautical miles (5.6 km; 3.5 mi) to the limit of Victorian waters.

== See also ==
- Protected areas of Victoria
- List of national parks of Australia
