= Brampton Island =

- Coordinates: 20°48′09″S 149°16′35″E
- Country: Australia
- State: Queensland

Area
  - Total: 4.6 km^{2} (1.8 sq mi)

Brampton Island is an island in the Cumberland Group, off shore from Mackay, Queensland, Australia. The island lies within the Great Barrier Reef World Heritage Area, and the majority of the island forms the Brampton Islands National Park, however there is a resort located on the island. The highest point of the island is Brampton Peak, 214 m above sea level.

== History ==
=== Early history ===
The traditional Aboriginal owners of Brampton Island are the Ngaro people, although no permanent population was present when Captain James Cook passed through the area in June 1770. The island was simply known as "M" in the naval charts until it was eventually given its European name in 1879, when Staff Commander Bedwell of the Royal Navy recognised the group of islands and named each after towns in the county of Cumberland. An expedition led by George Elphinstone Dalrymple landed at the island in 1860. They encountered a group of around 14 Aboriginal people with several bark canoes. These vessels were equipped with paddles decorated with red pigment as well as dugong-hunting harpoons made from palm fibre and sharpened bone.

=== Modern history ===
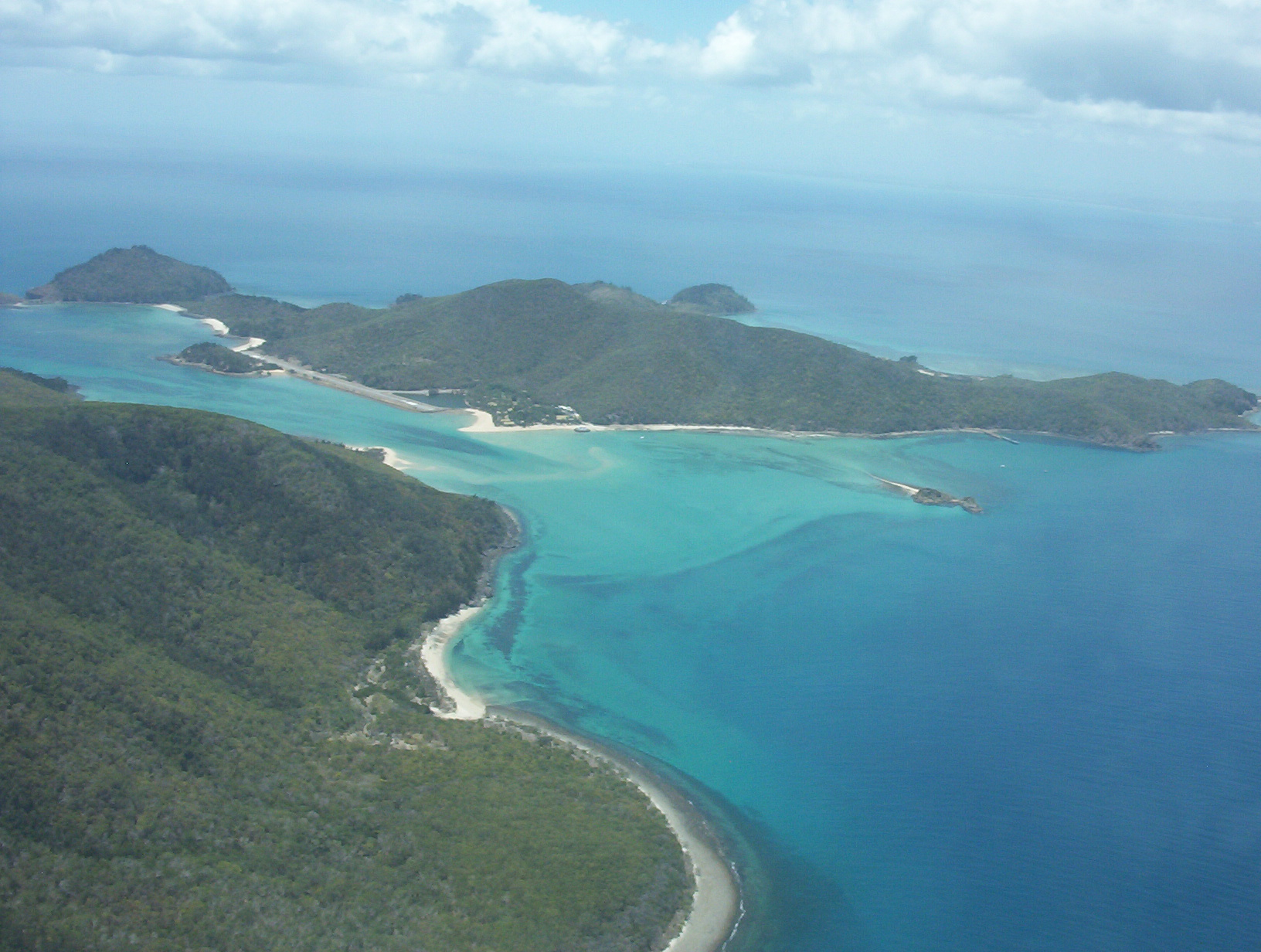
View of the island from the north east from a plane

==== Settlement and the development of the resort ====
In 1916, Joseph Busuttin and his family became the island's first European settlers. The island's resort was first established in December 1933 when two of the Busuttin sons welcomed passengers from the P&O ship Canberra. Busuttin's sons then sold the resort and left in 1959.

There were several owners briefly over the next two years, Carapark and Hotels of Australia. In 1961, the island was purchased for 80,000 pounds by the McLean family which had been operating Roylen Cruises from Mackay which was started by Tom McLean MBE, a former World War II Army Engineer.

Tom McLean's son Fitzroy, who previously had been the Master of an ex-World War II Fairmile, Roylen Star, became the manager of the island. Another former Roylen skipper, Ray Smith, became the Assistant Manager. The resort developed quickly with the aid of the Roylen Cruise fleet, operating a system called Cruise n Stay, by utilising both vessels and the accommodation at the island.

A small railway was introduced to run stores and supplies from the Deep Water Jetty to the resort. Due to the huge tidal differences (up to 6 metres or so) the jetty at the resort could only be utilised at certain times due to the depth of the water, whereas the Deep Water Jetty could be used around the clock.

An engineering feat during its day saw an airstrip built on the island in 1965 which was served by Trans Australia Airlines (TAA) aircraft including (during the 1970s) De Havilland Canada DHC-6 Twin Otters. It was, however, a relatively short airstrip and several aircraft had accidents there including one of TAA's Twin Otters. No one was killed in any of the accidents there.

There were several cyclones over this period and the island suffered considerable damage.

In the late 1980s the island's owners started demolishing villa style accommodation and constructed a new upmarket block referred to as the "Blue Lagoon" block. In 1985, TAA purchased Brampton Island, upgraded the resort. It was sold by successor Qantas to P&O in December 1997. After a major refurbishment, it was purchased by Voyages Hotels & Resorts in July 2004.

==== Celia Douty murder ====
On 1 September 1983, British resort worker Celia Douty was murdered in Dinghy Bay on Brampton Island. The crime remained unsolved until 2001, when it became the first murder in Australia to be solved using DNA profiling.

==== Light plane crash ====
On 3 April 2008, a single-engine Piper Cherokee crashed into the ocean just after taking off from Brampton Island. The pilot and four passengers survived and were rescued by helicopter.

== Land use ==
=== National park ===
Most of the island is part of Brampton Islands National Park, which is home to a range of wildlife and plants. There are also 17.8 km of walking tracks and a campsite, which requires a permit to use.

=== Resort ===
Until 2010 the Brampton Island Resort accommodated up to 220 guests in 106 rooms and was popular with couples. The resort offered a number of free and paid-for activities, including fishing trips, snorkelling and scenic flights.

The resort was operated by Voyages until 2010 when it was sold to Brampton Enterprises. In November 2010, Brampton Enterprises announced a major redevelopment of the resort which would involve closing the resort from 24 January 2011, with an expected reopening in December 2011. However, the resort did not reopen.

As at 2016, the resort was abandoned.
