= Dularcha Railway Tunnel =

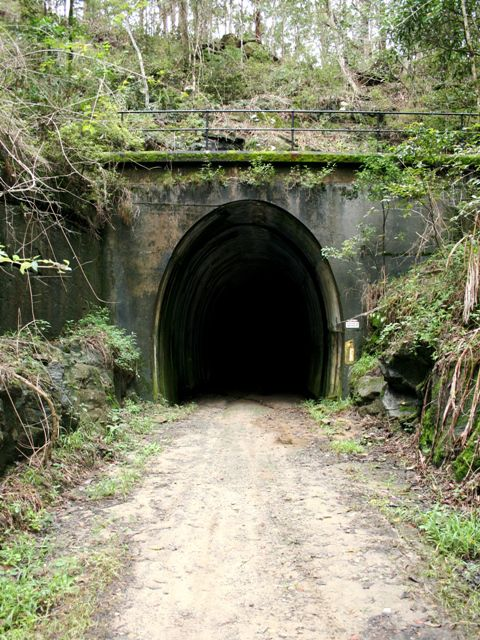
- Southern end of the Dularcha Railway Tunnel, 2009

- Location within Queensland Location within Australia
- 26.7804°S 152.9615°E
- Location: 1.5 km south of Mooloolah township in Landsborough, Sunshine Coast Region, Queensland, Australia

History
- Design period: 1870s - 1890s (late 19th century)
- Built: 1890 - 1891

Queensland Heritage Register
- Official name: Dularcha Railway Tunnel, North Coast Line No 1 : Mooloolah tunnel
- Type: state heritage (archaeological, built)
- Designated: 24 September 1999
- Reference no.: 601522
- Significant period: 1890s (fabric); 1891-1932 (historical railway use); 1924.
- Significant components: graffiti, cutting - railway, drainage, tunnel - railway
- Builders: T Jesser & Company

Dularcha Railway Tunnel is a heritage-listed former railway tunnel at 1.5 kilometres (0.93 mi) south of Mooloolah township in Landsborough, Sunshine Coast Region, Queensland, Australia. It was built from 1890 to 1891 by T Jesser & Company. It is also known as North Coast Line No 1 : Mooloolah tunnel. It was added to the Queensland Heritage Register on 24 September 1999.

== History ==
Dularcha Railway Tunnel, constructed in 1890–91, formed part of the section of railway from Landsborough to Yandina, which in turn was part of the North Coast railway line from Brisbane to Gympie.

The construction of Queensland railways began in 1864, however, unlike other states, routes were constructed independently of each other. Consequently, while a rail line had extended north from Gympie to Maryborough since 1881, it was not until 1888 that a line was opened from Brisbane to create a link with Gympie. Surveys for the section of line between Caboolture and Gympie had begun as early as 1884, however, the terrain had created difficulties which was eventually resolved by the construction of four major bridges and two tunnels. The North Coast Line was opened at Gympie in 1891. At the time, the North Coast Line was a direct link between Brisbane and Maryborough and brought Gympie within easy reach of Brisbane. So convenient was the line that a return journey from Brisbane to Gympie could be made in one day. Troops sent to quell the 1891 Shearer's Strike in Central Queensland were transported on this line.

The North Coast Line soon became a dominant method of freight transportation with passenger traffic increasing dramatically as each new link further north created an integrated rail system. It was popularity of train travel that promoted the gazetting of Dularcha National Park on 21 May 1924 under the State Forests and National Parks Act 1906. The area covered 336 acres (136 ha). This area included that part of the Landsborough to Yandina line which incorporated the Dularcha Railway Tunnel. Between 1900 and 1920, the North Coast Line was gradually increasing in importance. It was constructed over a period of forty years and coastal rail freight grew slowly as coastal shipping offered cheaper rates for heavy freight.

The first section of the railway specifically built as part of the North Coast Line was the line from Caboolture to Gympie. Surveying began in 1882 and took six years. There were so many new lines being planned that surveying resources were thinly spread. It was October 1886 before Section 5 from Gympie South to Martin's Halfway House (Cooran) on the road to Noosa was completed. The contract was awarded to Willocks & Company.

The North Coast Line from Brisbane's Roma Street to Sandgate opened on 11 May 1882. Later from Nundah to Petrie on 1 March 1888 and Caboolture on 11 June 1888. Plans of section 2 and 3 from Caboolture to Yandina were approved in November 1887 and was awarded to T Jesser and Company on 14 December 1888. The Jesser and Company had also been given the contract for the Bowen Railway in April 1890. Besides the major bridges over the Mooloolah River, Eudlo Creek, Petrie Creek and the South Maroochy River, the line included the only two tunnels on the entire North Coast Line, one of which was the Dularcha Railway Tunnel. Sections were opened as they were completed, from Caboolture to Landsborough on 1 February 1890, and to Yandina from 1 January 1891. For the first time the trip from Gympie to Brisbane could be accomplished in a day, a twelve-hour trip. Some of the first passengers to make the one-day journey were the troops sent to Central Queensland to quell the Shearers' strike.

The Brisbane-Gympie link put the Queensland Railways into competition with coastal shipping for the first time. Work began on regrading the North Coast line between Caboolture and Gympie in 1928 and continued until 1932. The northern section of the railway line including the tunnel was abandoned in 1932. At this time, the line was deviated east (about 600 metres (2,000 ft) south of the south portal) to its current location. As a result of the line deviation, the area of Dularcha National Park increased to 342 acres (138 ha).

Following the closure of the tunnel for railway purposes area was closed off inside the opening of the south portal when it was leased for mushroom growing c. 1942. An unsealed vehicular track, in part following the original rail route, passes through the National Park and the tunnel. The road connects the two communities of Landsborough and Mooloola.

The Dularcha Railway Tunnel was identified in the Queensland Railway Heritage Places Study: Stage 2. Volume 4.

== Description ==
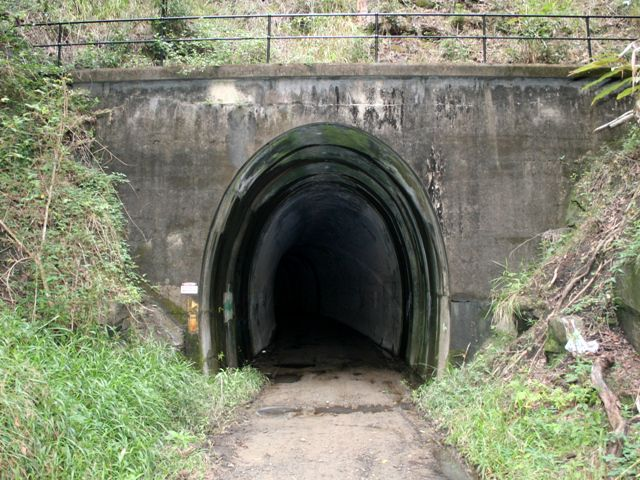
Northern end, 2009

Built through a sandstone ridge, Dularcha railway tunnel is located within Dularcha National Park, 5 kilometres (3.1 mi) north of Landsborough. Dominant vegetation in the area is brush box, flooded gums and ironbarks and stringybarks along the ridge. Part of the southern approach of the tunnel runs parallel to the current North Coast Line rail track.

The tunnel runs on a north–south axis. Two semi-elliptical concrete portals are located at the north and south openings of the tunnel. The tunnel is concrete-lined throughout with cuttings at either end. A vehicular dirt track in the National Park in part following the original rail line now removed, passes through the Dularcha Railway Tunnel joining the two towns.

The tunnel is approximately 100 metres (330 ft) long and curves slightly towards the northern portal. The northern and southern portals are both similar in structure and design. They are curved and are approximately 4 metres (13 ft) high and 4.2 metres (14 ft) wide. A horizontal concrete ridge is located at the top of each facade, delineating the completion of the tunnel and the commencement of the natural sandstone and vegetation. Protruding from the cement facade of each portal, under the horizontal ridges and near to the natural rock wall, is a terracotta drainage pipe with a diameter of 20 centimetres (7.9 in).

Internally, the tunnel is surfaced with undecorated cement. Two safety bays are recessed into the tunnel and wall are also concrete faced. They are located approximately one third of the way in from each portal on its left and are wide enough for two people. Weep holes are located throughout the tunnel and are colonised by small bats, including the large-footed myotis. The interior is cool and moist.

The interior walls near the portal openings have been subject to graffiti. Recent spray painting is evident, however, etched into the cement are letters, numbers and other unidentifiable marks, some appearing to be names and dates dating back to as early as 1910. Remains of a wall that once closed off the tunnel about half a metre inside the southern portal are still visible. A little further inside the tunnel, fixed to each wall, are several metal brackets, thought to be the remains of a gate hinge. Directly outside the southern portal, on the eastern side, lies the remains of a corroded rail line. Above the northern portal, on the western side, are the remains of telegraph poles.

Across the top of the tunnel giving access to the State forest, is Rose's Road. Remains of two wood post and wire fences are located above the north and south portal and run parallel with Rose's Road. The fences may have been designed to restrict access to the tunnel portals from the ridge. They do not appear to restrict the use of or deny access to Rose's Road.

== Heritage listing ==
Dularcha Railway Tunnel was listed on the Queensland Heritage Register on 24 September 1999 having satisfied the following criteria.

The place is important in demonstrating the evolution or pattern of Queensland's history.

The Dularcha Railway Tunnel is significant as part of the original formation of the track between Brisbane and Maryborough. The Tunnel provides evidence of the importance of the railway as a means of transportation, and its expansion north, in the late 1880s. Dularcha Railway Tunnel is significant for its association with the gazettal of the Dularcha National Park in 1922. The boundaries of the Park were created around the railway line enabling steam train travelling passengers to view a part of Queensland's forests.

The place demonstrates rare, uncommon or endangered aspects of Queensland's cultural heritage.

The Dularcha Railway Tunnel is significant as one of only two tunnels constructed along the entire North Coast Line and is good example of a concrete lined tunnel constructed for Queensland's narrow-gauge railway lines.

The place is important in demonstrating the principal characteristics of a particular class of cultural places.

The Dularcha Railway Tunnel is significant as one of only two tunnels constructed along the entire North Coast Line and is good example of a concrete lined tunnel constructed for Queensland's narrow-gauge railway lines.
