= Benambra National Park =

Protected area in New South Wales, Australia

- IUCN category II (national park)
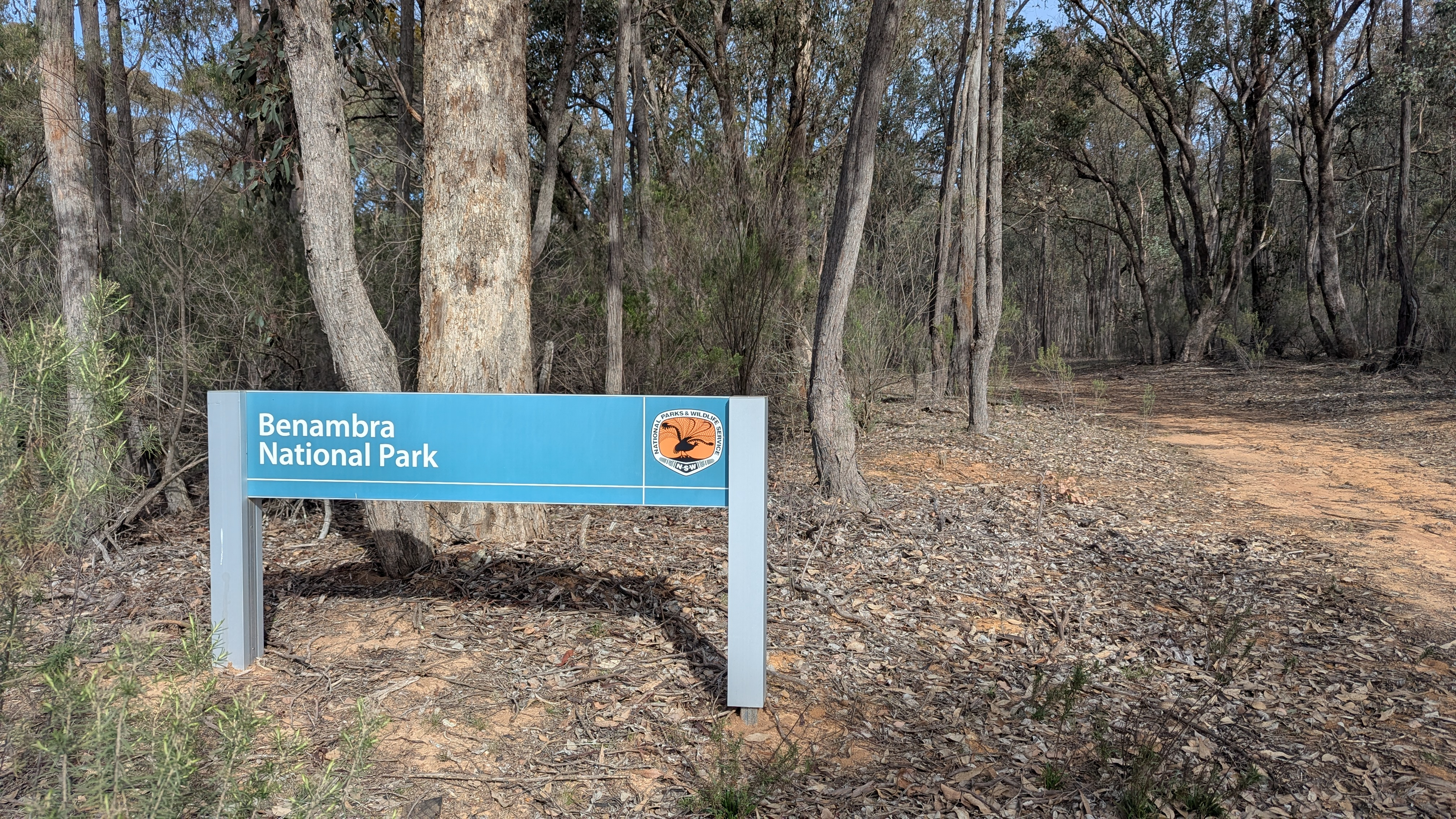

- Location within New South Wales
- Location: New South Wales
- Nearest city: Holbrook
- Coordinates: 35°46′50.1″S 147°05′54.6″E
- Area: 13.99 km^{2} (5.40 sq mi)
- Established: January 2001
- Governing body: NSW National Parks and Wildlife Service
- Website: https://www.nationalparks.nsw.gov.au/visit-a-park/parks/benambra-national-park

Benambra National Park is a protected national park that is located 30 kilometres (19 mi) northeast of Albury, 20 kilometres (12 mi) southeast of Culcairn, and 20 kilometres (12 mi) southwest of Holbrook, New South Wales, in the South West Slopes region of New South Wales, Australia. The park is almost entirely surrounded by private land, however access can be gained by contacting the NSW National Parks & Wildlife Service.

== History ==
Benambra National Park was initially declared a forest reserve in 1879, and in May 1918 it was reclassified as state forest. The national park was gazetted in 2001, to protect remnant areas of white box and red box woodlands, which have been extensively cleared across New South Wales. The park has a history of use for grazing and small scale timber harvesting for firewood and fencing.

In 1985 the entire park was burnt, after a lightning strike started a fire north-west of the reserve, which then burnt through park and stopped on a property adjacent to the eastern boundary of the park.

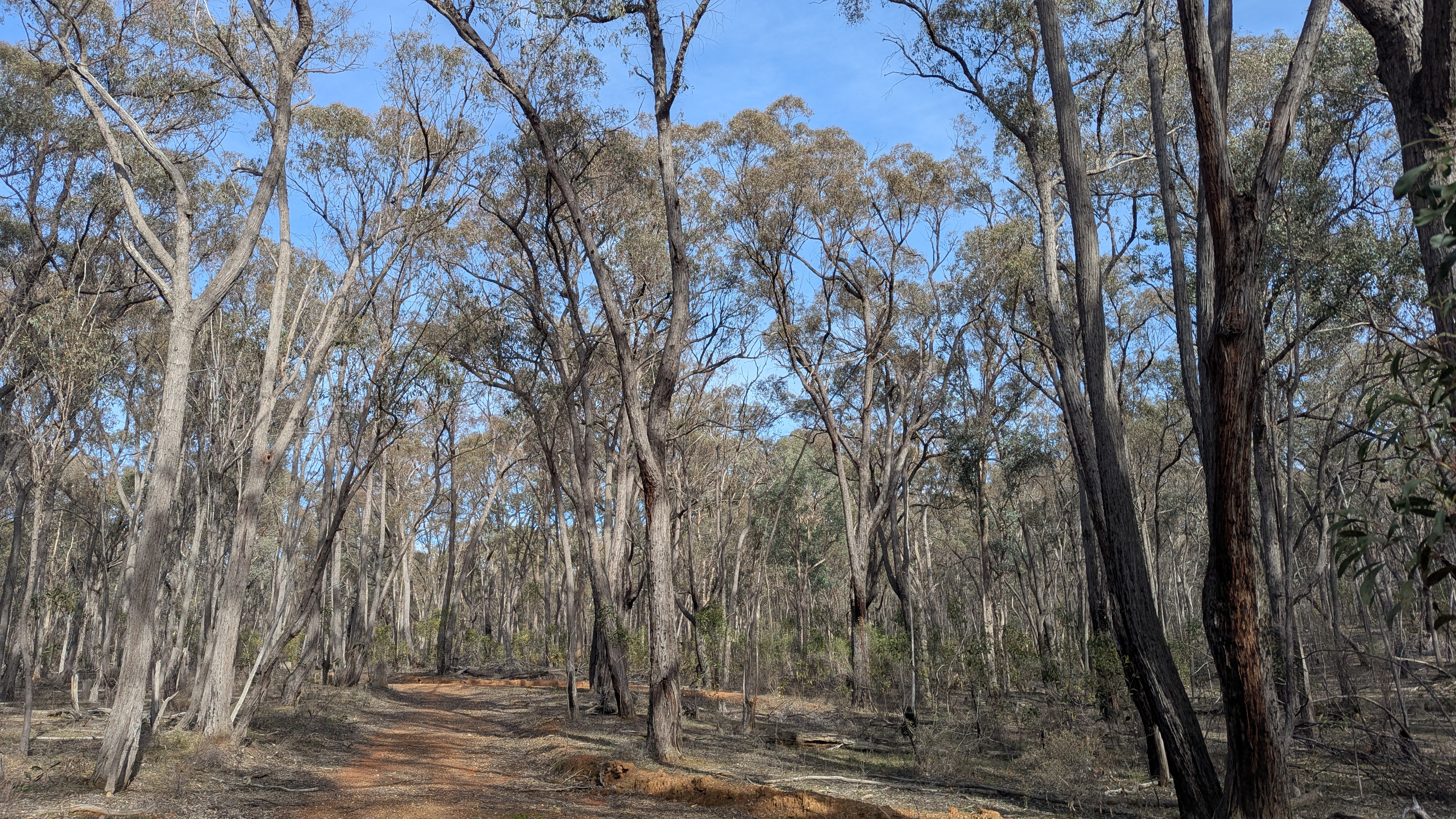
Eucalyptus forest, Benambra National Park

== Features ==
Benambra National Park is situated at the northern end of the Great Yambla Range, a prominent 23 kilometres (14 mi) long outcrop of cliff faces and flat-topped peaks, which forms part of the Lachlan Fold Belt. The park has an altitudinal range between 328 metres (1,076 ft) and 646 metres (2,119 ft) above sea level, covering steeply sloping hills, with only the north-eastern section of the national park being on relatively flat, low-lying country.

A large cave known as 'Morgan's Cave' exists within the park, which was reputedly used in the 1860s as a refuge by the notorious bushranger Dan Morgan.

=== Access ===
The park is almost entirely surrounded by private land. There is no public vehicle access to the park, however access to the park for activities such as bushwalking and birdwatching, can be gained by contacting the National Parks & Wildlife Service office in Tumut.

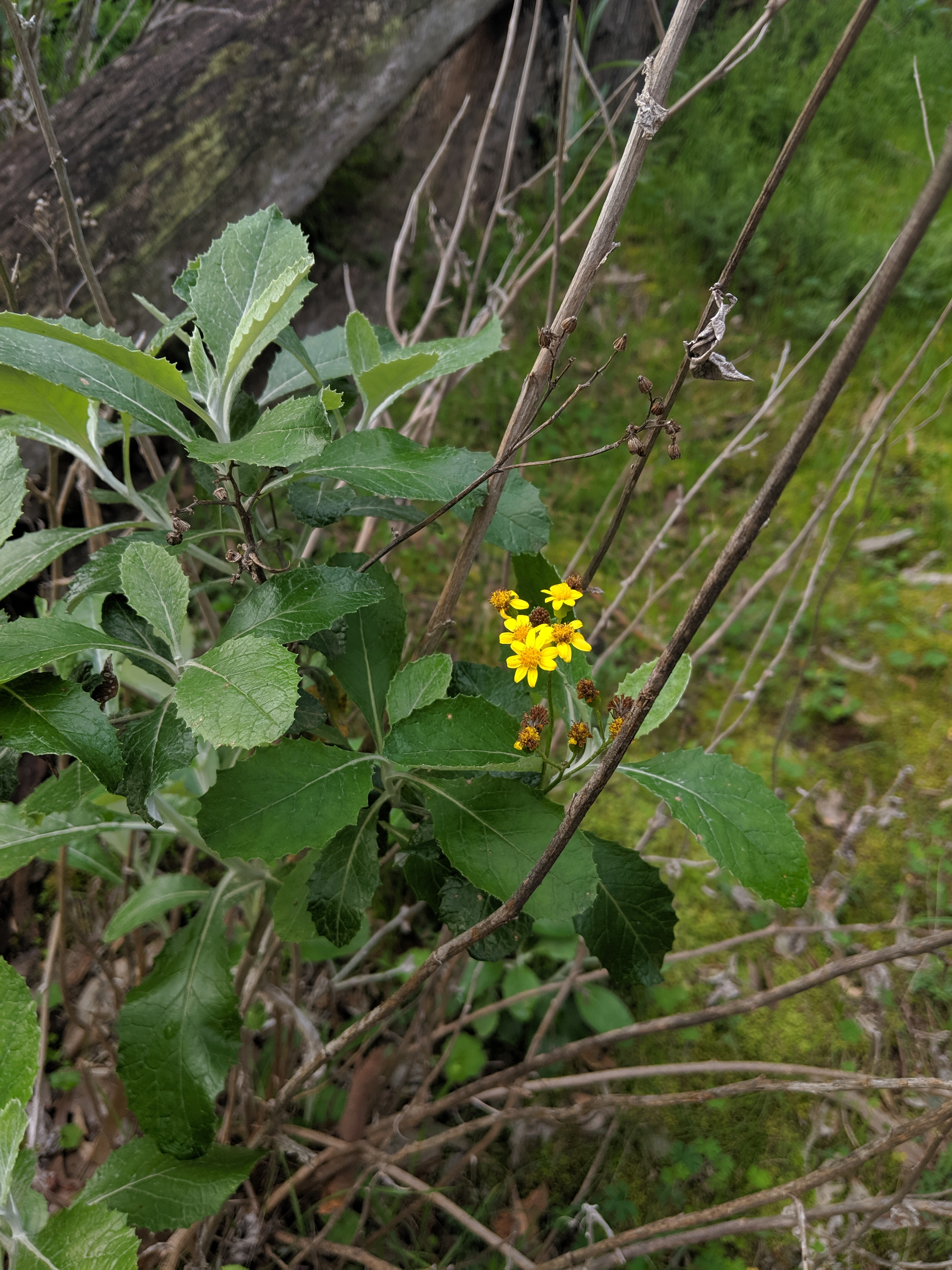
Flowering woolly ragwort

== Flora ==
The park comprises several vegetation communities. red box-white box-dry shrub open forest makes up 69 percent of the park, red box-long-leaved box grassy forest makes up 8 percent, red box swampy flat woodland makes up 7 percent, Dwyer's red gum-black cypress pine grass woodland makes up 5 percent, and 2 percent is Currawang wattle-drooping she-oak shrubland. Woolly ragwort, listed as Vulnerable in NSW under the Biodiversity Conservation Act 2016, occurs within Benambra National Park.

Invasive plants found in the park include St. John's wort, Paterson's curse and tree of heaven.

== Fauna ==
Threatened birds recorded in the park include black-chinned honeyeater, regent honeyeater, grey-crowned babbler, hooded robin, diamond firetail, painted honeyeater, swift parrot, turquoise parrot, brown treecreeper, and speckled warbler. Threatened mammals recorded in the park include southeastern long-eared bat, squirrel glider, eastern pygmy possum and yellow-footed antechinus. Reptiles found in the park include the yellow-faced whipsnake.

Several introduced pest species occur, including the European fox, feral goat, feral cat and European rabbit.

== See also ==
- Protected areas of New South Wales
- List of national parks of Australia
