= Dularcha National Park =

National park in Australia

- IUCN category II (national park)
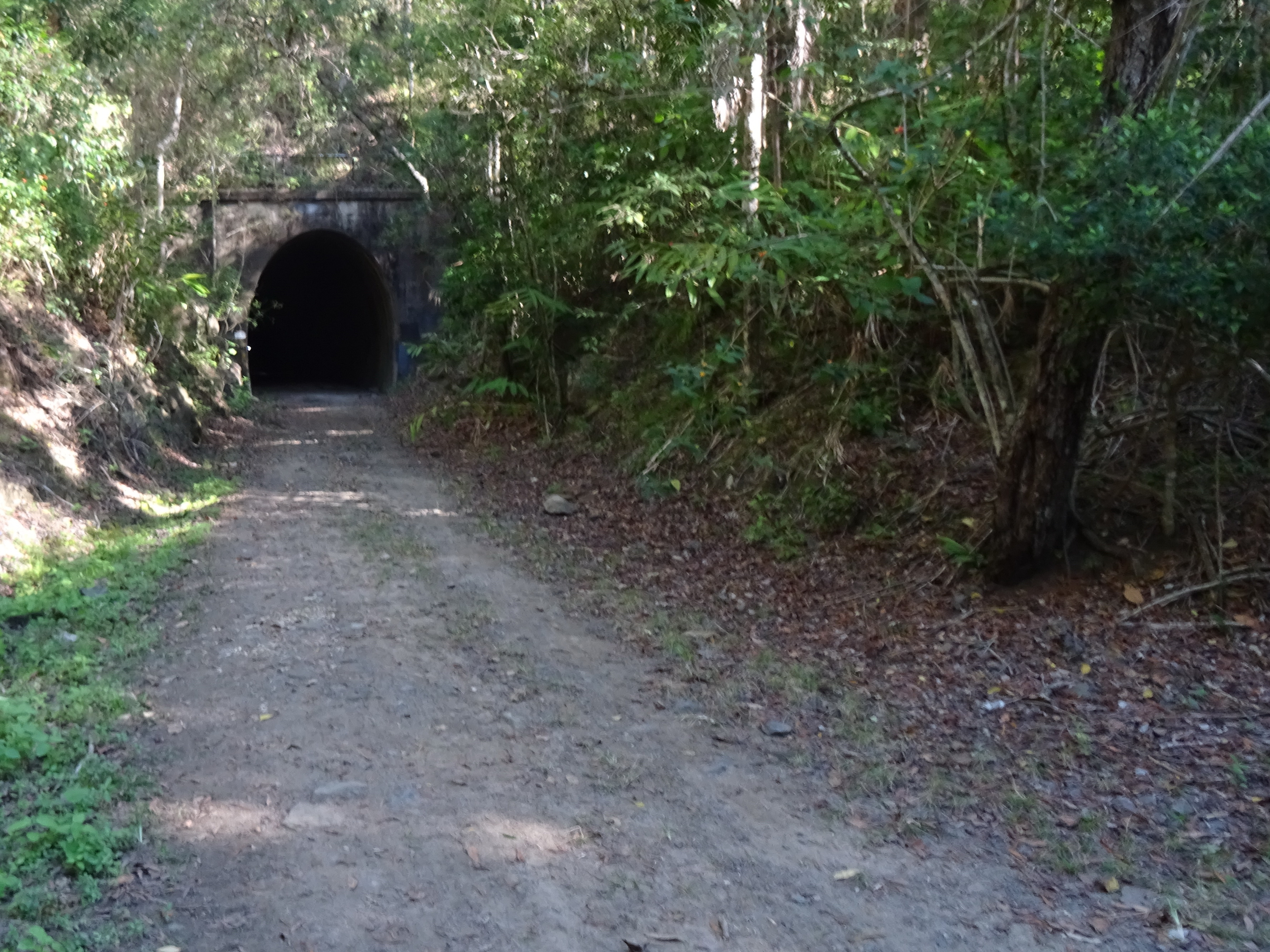
- Rail tunnel, Dularcha National Park, May 2017

- Location within Queensland
- Location: Queensland
- Coordinates: 26°46′36″S 152°57′40″E
- Area: 4.64 km^{2} (1.79 sq mi)
- Established: 1921
- Governing body: Queensland Parks and Wildlife Service
- Website: Official website

Dularcha is a national park in Queensland, Australia, 78 km north of Brisbane. The park occupies a north east portion of Landsborough. It is bisected by the North Coast railway line. The park covers an area of 4.64 km^{2} (1.79 sq mi). It lies within the Mooloolah River water catchment area of the South East Queensland bioregion.

The park features the heritage-listed Dularcha railway tunnel which was built in 1891. The park was initially declared so as to ensure rail passengers were provided a decent view of Queensland's forest. Use of the tunnel halted in 1932 when the line was moved to the east. The tunnel now serves as a seasonal lodge for a variety of small bats, including large-footed myotis. The park was extended in 2010 when Mooloolah Forest Reserve was added to the national park.

The park contains a riverine wetland covering 0.4 km^{2} (0.15 sq mi). A total of nine rare of threatened species have been identified within the park.

Dularcha National Park has a mild subtropical climate.

== Facilities ==
The only facilities provided are trails. Birdwatching, horse-riding, bush-walking and bike-riding are the main recreational activities in Dularcha. Camping is not permitted within the park. Domestic animals (with the exception of horses), fires, motorbikes and vehicles are banned.

== See also ==
- Protected areas of Queensland
