= Arakwal National Park =

National park in Australia

- IUCN category II (national park)
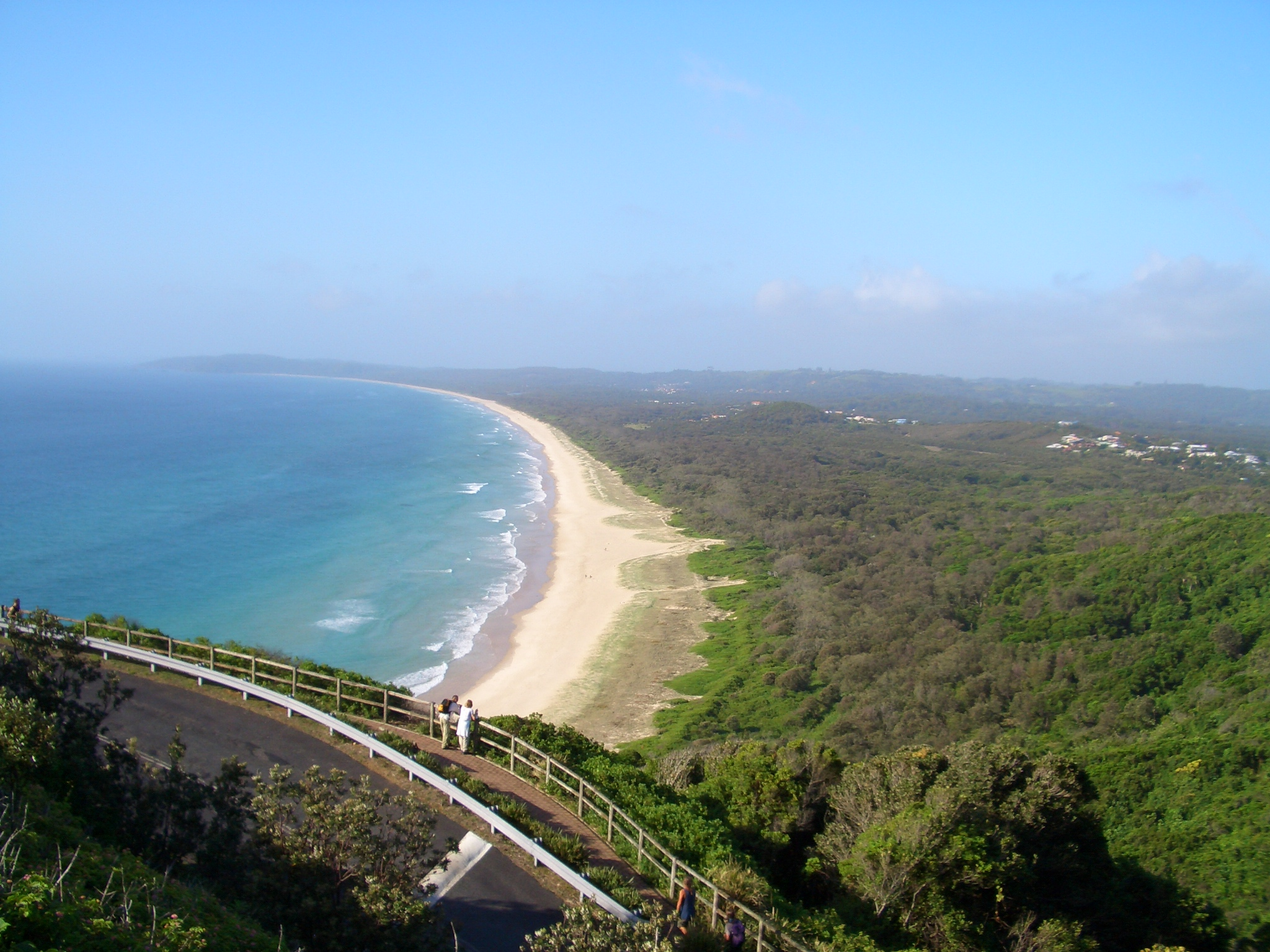
- Tallow Beach, Byron Bay; Arakwal National Park is on the right

- Location within New South Wales
- Location: New South Wales
- Nearest city: Byron Bay
- Coordinates: 28°39′37″S 153°37′16″E
- Area: 1.99 km^{2} (0.77 sq mi)
- Established: October 2001
- Governing body: NSW National Parks & Wildlife Service; The Arakwal National Park Management Committee
- Website: https://www.environment.nsw.gov.au/NationalParks/parkHome.aspx?id=N0173

Arakwal National Park is a national park in New South Wales, Australia, 624 km north of Sydney and immediately south of Cape Byron, the most easterly point of mainland Australia. The park protects an area of Wallum country, of coastal clay heaths, between the adjacent town of Byron Bay and east-facing Tallow Beach. It provides habitat to numerous bird species and two native frog species, the wallum froglet (Crinia tinnula) and wallum sedge frog (Litoria olongburensis), both of which are deemed vulnerable to extinction.

Traditionally the land of the Arakwal people, the park was proclaimed in 2001 after the Arakwal Indigenous community and the New South Wales state government reached a land use agreement. The Arakwal people are co-managers of the park.

National Park together with the Bay Byron its appeal a remote resort, the beach offers possibilities whale watching, bird watching, swimming, fishing and excursions.

Along the park stretch sandy beaches 3 kilometres long.

The Arakwal National Park is also listed under IUCN Green List along with Cape Byron State Conservation Area.

== See also ==
- List of national parks of Australia
- Protected areas of New South Wales
