= Pimbee National Park =

National park in Western Australia

- Interactive map of Pimbee National Park
- Type: National park
- Location: Gascoyne region
- Coordinates: 25°31′24″S 114°52′19″E
- Established: 2023
- Administrator: Department of Biodiversity, Conservation and Attractions Yinggarda Aboriginal Corporation

Pimbee National Park is a national park in the Gascoyne region of Western Australia, 180 km (110 mi) south-east of Carnarvon. It was declared in August 2023, is located in the Shire of Carnarvon, and is part of the Carnarvon xeric shrublands bioregion.

The national park is located on the traditional land of the Yingkarta people and is jointly managed by the Yinggarda Aboriginal Corporation and the Department of Biodiversity, Conservation and Attractions. At the time of the national park's creation, Kennedy Range National Park, also on Yingkarta country, was expanded and also placed under joint management, with the intention of having four Yingkarta rangers employed and based at Gascoyne Junction.

A Pimbee Conservation Park with a size of 99,000 hectares (240,000 acres) was proposed in 2019 on the former Pimbee leasehold property north of the Wooramel River and listed as in progress in the 2022 Collaborative Australian Protected Areas Database.
