= Murujuga National Park =

National park in Australia

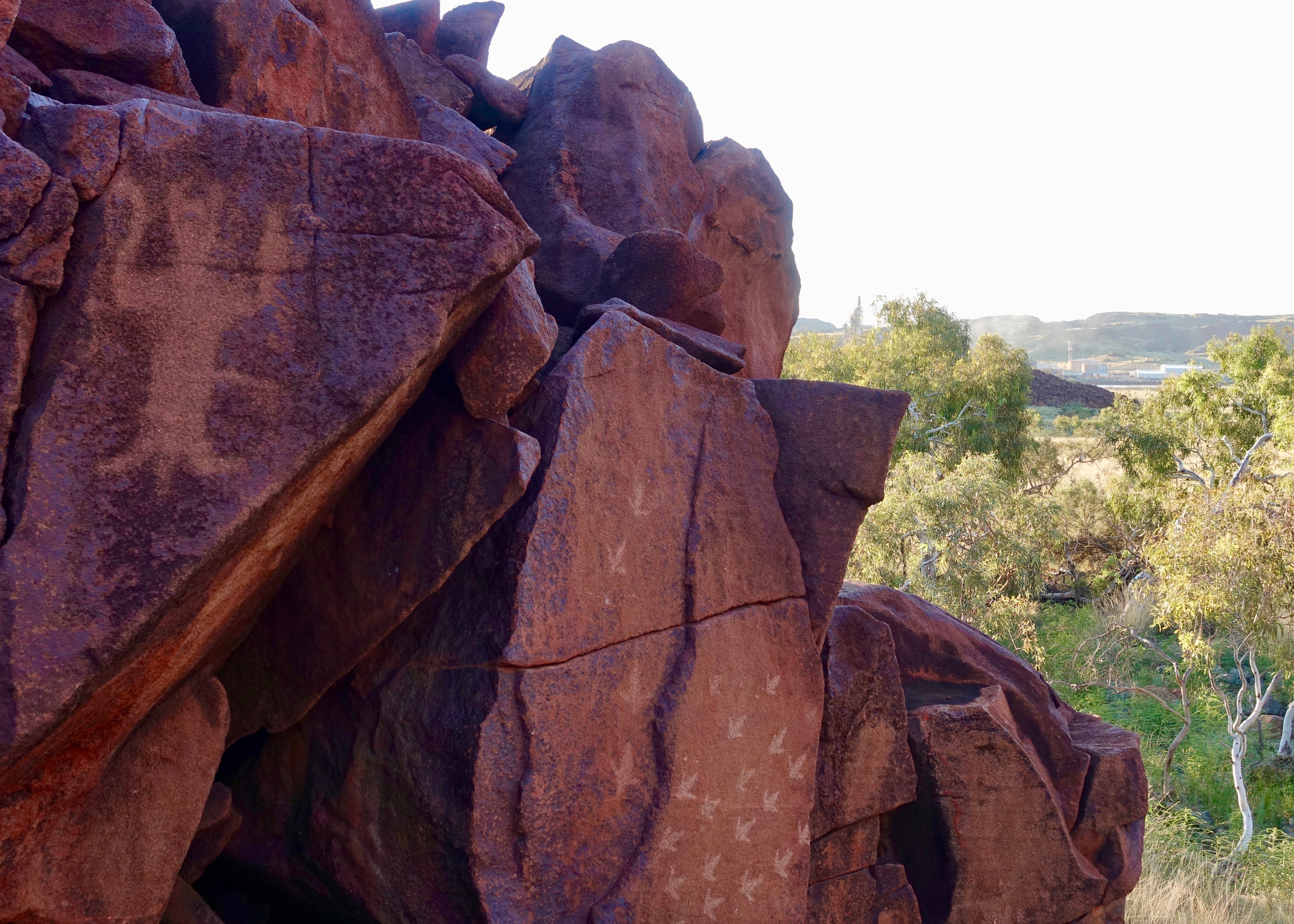

- Location within Western Australia
- Location: Pilbara, Western Australia, Australia
- Nearest city: Karratha (15 km)
- Coordinates: 20°35′S 116°50′E
- Area: 48.51 km^{2} (18.73 sq mi)
- Designation: National park
- Established: 17 January 2013
- Governing body: Department of Biodiversity, Conservation and Attractions
- Website: Murujuga National Park

Murujuga NP boundary

Murujuga National Park is a national park on Burrup Peninsula in the Pilbara region in the north-west of Western Australia, covering an area of 48.51 km^{2} (18.73 sq mi).

== History ==
Murujuga National Park was officially declared on 17 January 2013 as the 100th national park in Western Australia. The park protects what is considered the world’s highest concentration of ancient petroglyphs, with over ten thousand rock engravings created by the region's Aboriginal peoples.

== Description ==
The national park is located on the northern and western part of the Burrup Peninsula, also known by its Aboriginal name, Murujuga. It lies approximately 200 km (120 mi) west of Port Hedland and 15 km (9.3 mi) north of Karratha, and covers an area of 48.51 km^{2} (18.73 sq mi). It can be accessed via Dampier Road and Burrup Peninsula Road.

== Visiting ==
After the Murujuga National Park was closed for some months to allow for its construction, the Ngajarli Trail was completed in August 2020. Traditional owners working in collaboration with the government created a 700-metre (2,300 ft) universal boardwalk, along with interpretative signs. The Murujuga Aboriginal Corporation hopes to improve and enlarge facilities for visitors and to help them appreciate the cultural significance of the site.

== World Heritage Listing ==
In July 2025 UNESCO listed the rock art gallery, an area covering nearly 100,000 ha (250,000 acres) known as the Murujuga Cultural Landscape, as a World Heritage Site. The area includes the park.

=== Monitoring program and controversy ===
A monitoring program was instituted to develop emissions standards that would help protect the rock art from air pollution caused by industrial development on the Burrup peninsula. An 800-page monitoring report was completed in 2024 and made public on 22 August 2025, together with a summary document with an important graph having been altered against the lead scientist's wishes, and which included the statement: "The research indicates that the current levels of the pollutants of most concern for the rock art are lower than the interim guideline levels", this statement was described by the lead scientist, Adrian Baddeley, as, "factually incorrect and misrepresent(ing) the scientific findings". Adding to the discussion, WA Premier Roger Cook commented: "current industrial processes on the Burrup have not had an impact in relation to the rock art" and "... it's very pleasing that (there is) no ongoing impact as a result of that industrial activity", to which Baddeley's response was: "The claim that we established that no further damage is occurring to the rocks is simply false".

The year-old report and its summary were released just one month after the park's listing as a world heritage site and less than a week before the Australian federal government's announcement of a 40-year licence renewal for Woodside's Burrup Peninsula LNG plant.
