= Round Top Island National Park =

National park in Australia

- IUCN category II (national park)
- Location within Queensland
- Location: Queensland
- Coordinates: 21°10′31″S 149°15′53″E
- Area: 19 ha (47 acres)
- Governing body: Queensland Parks and Wildlife Service

Round Top Island is a national park in North Queensland, Australia, 797 km northwest of Brisbane.

== See also ==
- Protected areas of Queensland
