= Brampton Islands National Park =

National park in Australia

- IUCN category II (national park)
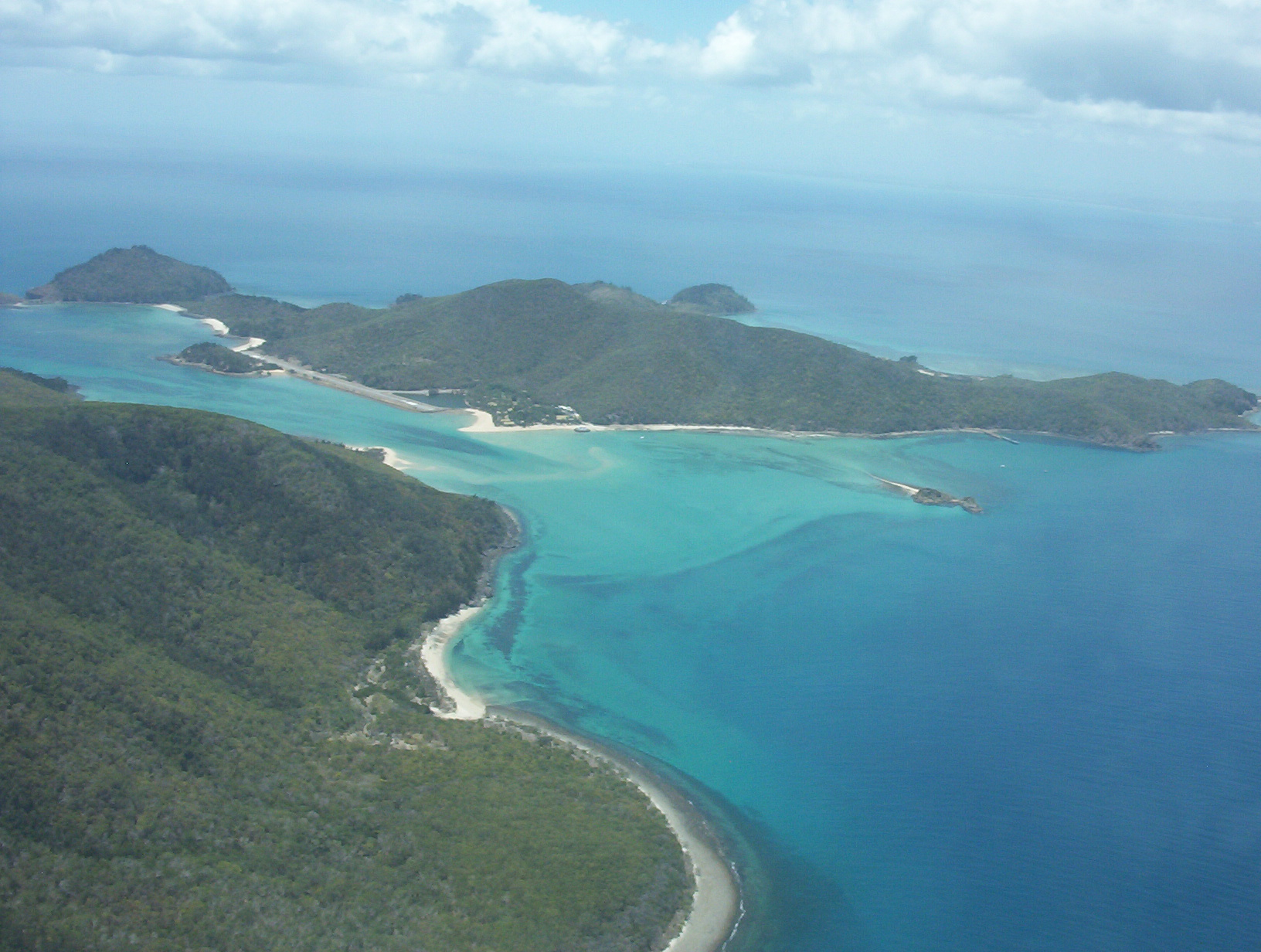
- Brampton Island

- Location within Queensland
- Location: Queensland
- Nearest city: Mackay
- Coordinates: 20°47′15″S 149°17′08″E
- Area: 10 km^{2} (3.9 sq mi)
- Established: 1968
- Governing body: Queensland Parks and Wildlife Service
- Website: http://www.nprsr.qld.gov.au/parks/brampton-islands/

Brampton Islands is a national park in the Mackay Region, Queensland, Australia, 834 kilometres (518 mi) northwest of Brisbane. The park covers much of Brampton Island and all of Carlisle Island.

The park features rainforests, sandy beaches and coral reefs. Walks exist to the summit and a circuit around the whole island. The 8.7 km circuit track leads visitors through open eucalypt forests, vine thickets, dry rainforests, grasslands and mangroves.

Camping is permitted on Carlisle Island which has some facilities. Marine stingers are found in the waters of the park between October and May.

One of the most striking features of the national park is Brampton Peak, which rises 214 metres above sea level.

Of the mammals in the park, koalas are represented, coastal sheath-tailed bat and black flying-fox.

== See also ==
- Protected areas of Queensland
