= Sir Charles Hardy Group National Park =

National park in Australia

- IUCN category II (national park)
- Location within Queensland
- Location: Queensland
- Coordinates: 11°54′16″S 143°27′38″E
- Area: 1.29 km^{2} (0.50 sq mi)
- Established: 1989
- Governing body: Queensland Parks and Wildlife Service

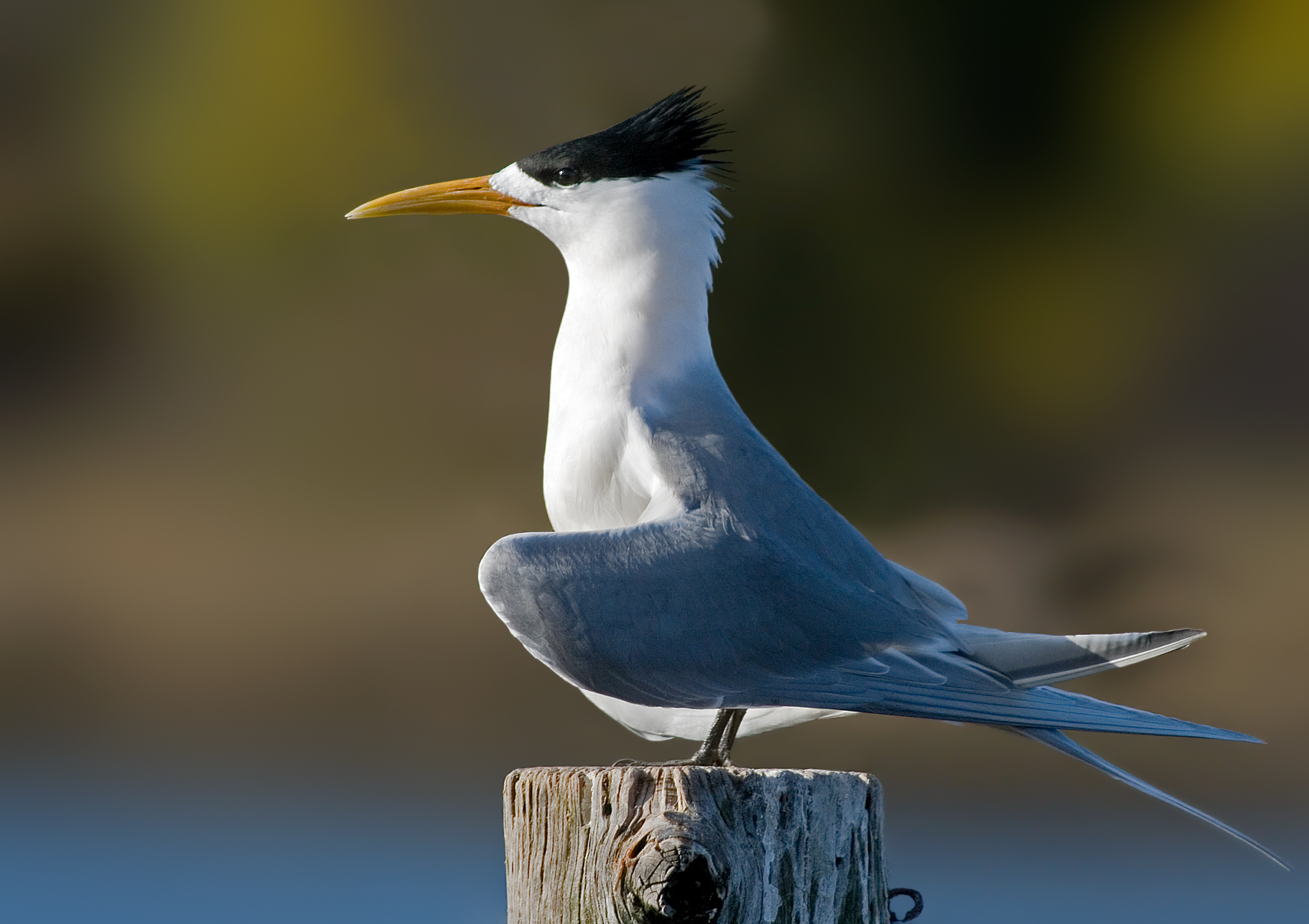
Crested Tern (Thalasseus bergii) in Tasmania, Australia

Sir Charles Hardy Group was a national park in Far North Queensland, Australia,1,997 km northwest of Brisbane. It was returned to the Wuthathi people in a land transfer in 2016.

== See also ==
- Protected areas of Queensland
