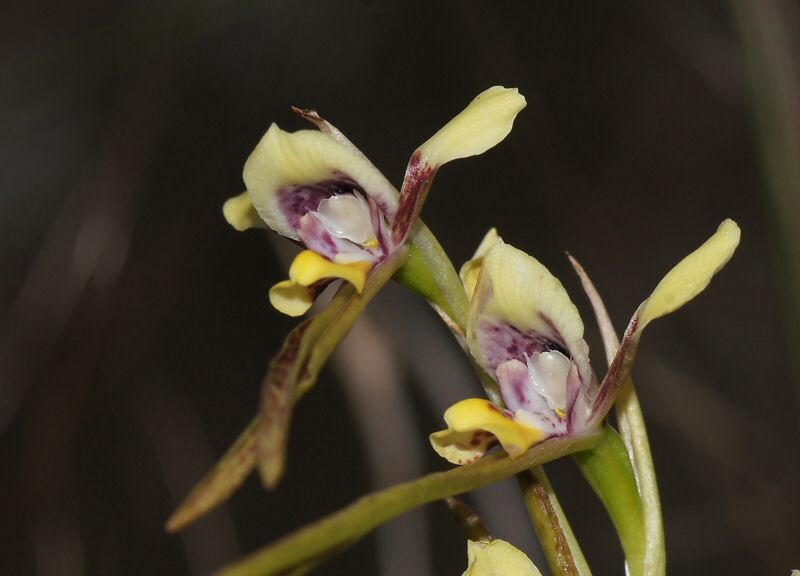

Scientific classification
- Kingdom: Plantae
- Clade: Embryophytes
- Clade: Tracheophytes
- Clade: Angiosperms
- Clade: Monocots
- Order: Asparagales
- Family: Orchidaceae
- Subfamily: Orchidoideae
- Tribe: Diurideae
- Genus: Diuris
- Species: D. tricolor

Binomial name
- Diuris tricolor Fitzg.

Synonyms
- Diuris sheaffiana Fitzg.; Diuris colemanae Rupp orth.var.; Diuris colemaniae Rupp

= Diuris tricolor =

Long-tailed donkey orchid

Species of orchid

Diuris tricolor, commonly known as long-tailed donkey orchid or pine donkey orchid, is a species of orchid that is endemic to eastern Australia. It has up to three grass-like leaves and up to six orange-coloured to yellow flowers with white and purplish tints. The lateral sepals are unusually long.

== Description ==
Diuris tricolor is a tuberous, perennial herb with up to three linear leaves 200–300 mm (8–10 in) long, 3–4 mm (0.1–0.2 in) wide and folded lengthwise. Between two and six orange-coloured to yellow flowers with white and purplish tints, 25–30 mm (0.98–1.2 in) wide are borne on a flowering stem 200–400 mm (8–20 in) tall. The dorsal sepal curves upwards, 10–15 mm (0.4–0.6 in) long, 6–9 mm (0.2–0.4 in) wide and broadly egg-shaped. The lateral sepals are narrow linear, 20–65 mm (0.8–3 in) long, much less than 1 mm (0.04 in) wide and turned downwards. The petals are more or less erect or turned backwards, egg-shaped to elliptic, the blade 10–16 mm (0.4–0.6 in) long and 6–10 mm (0.2–0.4 in) wide on a reddish purple stalk 3–7 mm (0.1–0.3 in) long. The labellum is 8–12 mm (0.3–0.5 in) long and has three lobes. The centre lobe is egg-shaped, 6–9 mm (0.2–0.4 in) long and wide with a central ridge. The side lobes are 3–4.5 mm (0.1–0.2 in) long and about 2 mm (0.08 in) wide. There are two callus ridges about 4 mm (0.2 in) long near the mid-line of the labellum. Flowering occurs from September to November.

== Taxonomy and naming ==
Diuris tricolor was first formally described in 1885 by Robert FitzGerald and the description was published in the Journal of Botany, British and Foreign. The specific epithet (tricolor) is derived from the Latin prefix tri- meaning "three", and color meaning "hue", "tint" or "complexion".

In 1940, Herman Rupp described D. colemaniae in honour of Edith Coleman and which he noted had shorter lateral sepals and a "quite different" labellum. Diuris colemaniae is now regarded as a synonym of D. tricolor.

== Distribution ==
Long-tailed donkey orchid grows in grassland and forest in south-east Queensland, sporadically south from Deepwater in New South Wales, and in the Australian Capital Territory. A single specimen has been recorded in Victoria, just south of the border.

== Conservation ==
Diuris tricolor is classed as Vulnerable in New South Wales under the Biodiversity Conservation Act 2016. The main threats to the species are habitat alteration and grazing by rabbits and goats.
