= Saunders Islands National Park =

National park in Queensland, Australia

- IUCN category II (national park)
- Location within Queensland
- Location: Queensland
- Coordinates: 11°42′12″S 143°10′47″E
- Area: 0.19 km^{2} (0.073 sq mi)
- Established: 1989
- Governing body: Queensland Parks and Wildlife Service

Saunders Islands is a national park in Far North Queensland, Australia, 2031 km northwest of Brisbane.

== See also ==
- Protected areas of Queensland
