= Conimbla National Park =

National park in New South Wales, Australia

- IUCN category II (national park)
- Location within New South Wales
- Location: New South Wales
- Nearest city: Cowra
- Coordinates: 33°44′54″S 148°26′21″E
- Area: 84.71 km^{2} (32.71 sq mi)
- Established: 18 July 1980
- Governing body: NSW National Parks and Wildlife Service
- Website: http://www.nationalparks.nsw.gov.au/conimbla-national-park

The Conimbla National Park is a protected national park in the Central West region of New South Wales in eastern Australia. The 8,471-hectare (20,930-acre) national park is situated approximately 253 kilometres (157 mi) west of Sydney, northwest of Cowra and northeast of Grenfell.

== Features ==
The park is important for the conservation of a sample of the plant and animal communities of the central west, an area which has largely been cleared and developed for agriculture. The Conimbla National Park also provides habitat for several species of threatened fauna and conserves populations of a number of plant species and communities which are now uncommon or rare because of clearing.

The park contains very attractive scenery, including a number of clifflines, a small gorge and several waterfalls. These ranges and peaks are important landscape features in the district. As it is one of the few naturally vegetated areas remaining in the district the park has the potential to be a valuable educational and recreational resource for locals and tourists.

One of the more visible features of the national park is Mount Yambira, which with its wooded chains rises 500 metres above the plain, forming a "bush island" in the middle of arable land in the west.

== See also ==
- Protected areas of New South Wales
- List of national parks of Australia
