= Regions of New South Wales =

In the state of New South Wales, Australia, there are many areas which are commonly known by regional names. Regions are areas that share similar characteristics. These characteristics may be natural such as the Murray River, the coastline, or the Snowy Mountains. Alternatively, the characteristics may be cultural, such as a viticulture land use. New South Wales is divided by numerous regional boundaries, based on different characteristics. In many cases boundaries defined by different agencies are coterminous.

== Local government ==
In New South Wales on the third tier of elected government after the federal and state governments are the local government authorities, which are responsible for the local government areas. The types of LGAs in New South Wales are cities, municipalities, shires and regions.

New South Wales has more than 150 local government areas which have an elected council and carry out various functions delegated to them by the Government of New South Wales.

== Australian Bureau of Statistics ==
The Australian Bureau of Statistics has moved towards a new Geographical Classification called the Australian Statistical Geography Standard. Geography is now divided into Statistical Area Level 1, 2, 3, and 4. Statistical Area Level 4 is the highest (regions of a State) and Statistical Area Level 1 being the lower (Mesh blocks are more refined but not readily available apart from the Census of Population and Housing).

Population by Statistical Area Level 4 and 3
NSW rank	Statistical Area Level 4 and 3	Population December 2014	10-year growth rate	Population density (people/km^{2})
1	Greater Sydney	4,840,628	15.7	391.4
2	Newcastle and Lake Macquarie	368,131	9.0	423.1
3	Illawarra	296,845	9.3	192.9
4	Hunter Valley excluding Newcastle	264,087	16.2	12.3
5	Richmond Tweed	242,116	8.9	23.6
6	Capital region	220,944	10.9	4.3
7	Mid North Coast	212,787	9.2	11.3
8	Central West	209,850	7.9	3.0
9	New England and North West	186,262	5.3	1.9
10	Riverina	158,144	4.7	2.8
11	Southern Highlands and Shoalhaven	146,388	10.4	21.8
12	Coffs Harbour-Grafton	136,418	7.6	10.3
13	Far West and Orana	119,742	0.3	0.4
14	Murray	116,130	4.0	1.2
New South Wales		7,518,472	10.4	13.0

For older statistics, such as the 2006 Census of Population and Housing, the Australian Bureau of Statistics has multiple regional structures for which it analyses and reports data. These regional structures derive from the Australian Standard Geographical Classification (AGSC). The AGSC defines at the very smallest level, the Census Collection District (CCD). These CCD's aggregate to form the Statistical Local Area (SLA), which is the common base unit for each of the larger regional structures. The boundaries of the SLA are designed to be typically coterminous with Local Government Areas unless the LGA does not fit entirely into a Statistical Subdivision (SSD), or is not of a comparative nature to other LGA's. Bureau of Statistics provides statistics for Local Government Areas, as well as three other statistical structures: Statistical Divisions, Statistical Regions, and Statistical Districts.

=== Statistical Divisions ===
Statistical Divisions (SD) form the main structural hierarchy of statistical analysis. These regions are structured to provide a broad range of social, demographic and economic statistics. The basis for the boundary delineations center on socioeconomic criteria. The thirteen divisions for New South Wales are:

Central West, Far West, Hunter, Illawarra, Mid-North Coast, Murray, Murrumbidgee, North Western, Northern, Off-Shore Areas & Migratory, Richmond-Tweed, South Eastern, Sydney

=== Statistical Regions ===
The Statistical Region (SR) structure was established in 1986 as a means for labor force analysis.

Sydney: Canterbury-Bankstown, Central Northern Sydney, Central Western Sydney, Eastern Suburbs, Fairfield-Liverpool, Gosford-Wyong, Inner Sydney, Inner Western Sydney, Lower Northern Sydney, North Western Sydney, Northern Beaches, Outer South Western Sydney, St George-Sutherland
Balance of New South Wales: Central West, Far West-North Western, Hunter, Illawarra, Mid-North Coast, Murray-Murrumbidgee, Northern, Richmond-Tweed, South Eastern

=== Statistical Districts ===
The Statistical District (SDist) is a non-capital, urban region of one or more adjoining areas, with a population of 25,000 or more. The SDist is defined with consideration of a 20-year growth forecast. The SDist does not need to conform to LGA boundaries or to state territory boundaries. The thirteen Statistical Districts in New South Wales are:

Newcastle, Wollongong, Nowra-Bomaderry, Bathurst-Orange, Lismore, Coffs Harbour, Port Macquarie, Tamworth, Dubbo, Wagga Wagga, Albury-Wodonga (New South Wales and Victoria), Gold Coast-Tweed (New South Wales and Queensland), Canberra-Queanbeyan (New South Wales and the Australian Capital Territory)

== Biogeographic regions ==
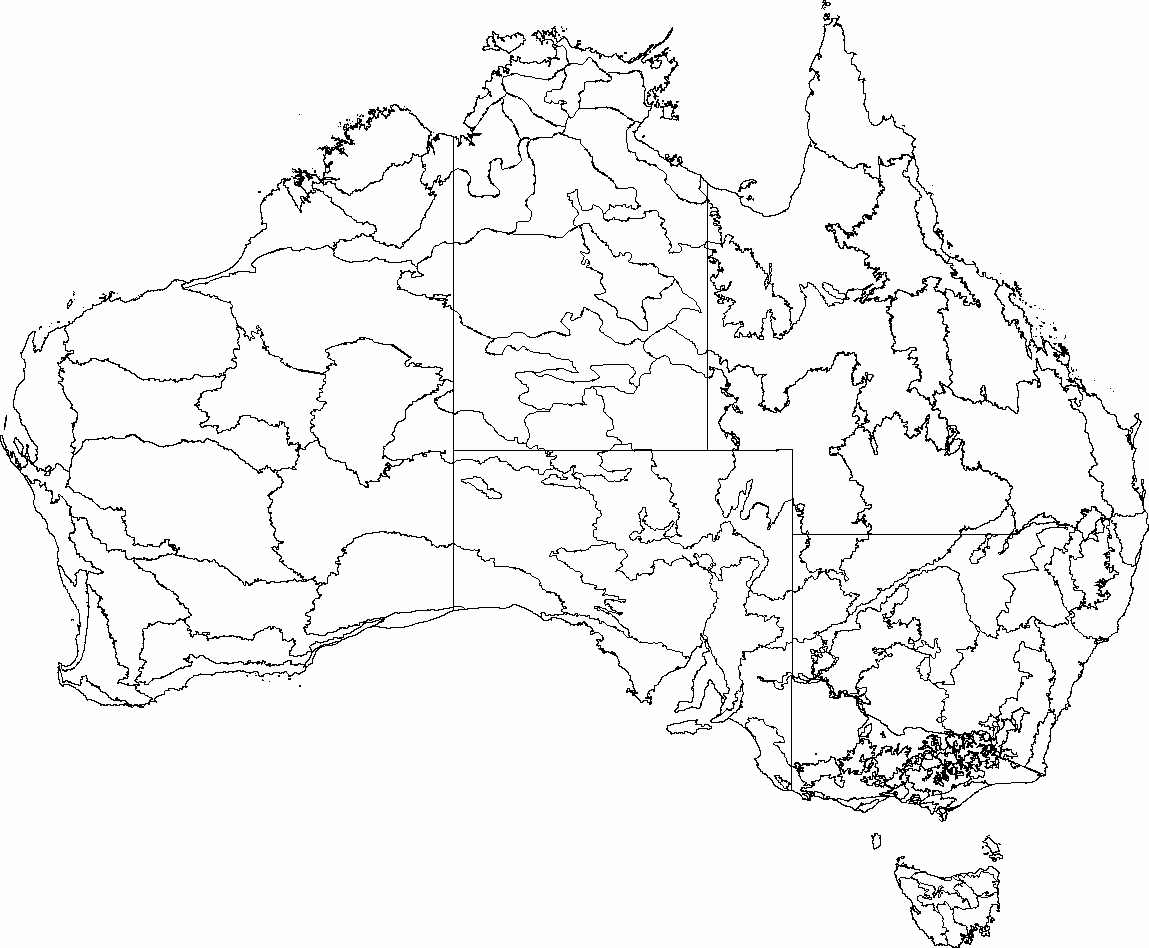
IBRA 6.1 regions map

The Interim Biogeographic Regionalisation for Australia (IBRA) is a biogeographic regionalisation of Australia; divided into 89 bioregions and 419 subregions. Each region is a land area made up of a group of interacting ecosystems that are repeated in similar form across the landscape. Regions and subregions cross state and territory boundaries. The bioregions that are located within all or part of New South Wales include:

- Australian Alps (part)
- Brigalow Belt South (part)
- Broken Hill Complex (part)
- Channel Country (part)
- Cobar Peneplain
- Darling Riverine Plains (part)
- Flinders Lofty Block (part)
- Mulga Lands (part)
- Murray Darling Depression (part)
- Nandewar (part)
- New England Tablelands
- NSW North Coast
- NSW South Western Slopes (part)
- Riverina (part)
- Simpson Strzelecki Dunefields (part)
- South East Corner (part)
- South Eastern Highlands (part)
- South East Queensland (part)
- Southern Volcanic Plain (part)
- Sydney Basin (Cumberland Plain)

== Informal divisions ==
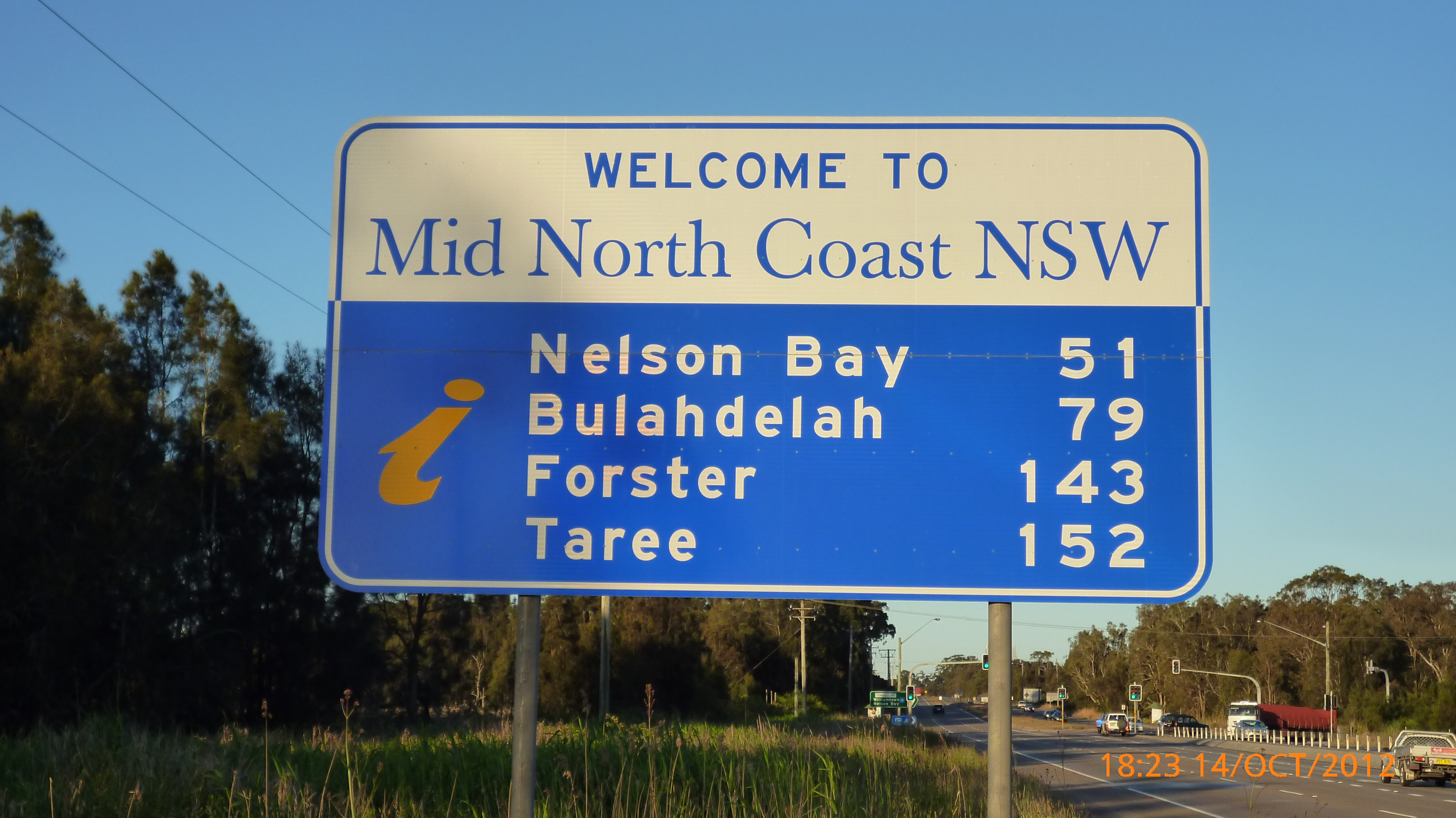
Despite being geographically in the Hunter Region, Port Stephens Council includes itself in the Mid North Coast for commercial purposes. This sign, welcoming travellers to the Mid North Coast, is only 900 m (2,953 ft) from the Hunter River on the Pacific Highway at Tomago.

New South Wales is also informally divided into a smaller number of regions. These regions have no general administrative function or status. Many of them are only vaguely defined, or are defined in different ways for different purposes. For example, departments of the New South Wales government, such as the New South Wales Police Force, or the Ministry of Health, define regions of the State for their own internal administrative purposes. These regions may be defined in completely different ways, as shown by the maps in the references.

The original basis for descriptive regional names in New South Wales is based on the geography of the State.

The State can be divided into four components:

- the coastal regions fronting the Tasman Sea in the east of the State
- the highlands which form part of the Great Dividing Range
- the western (inland) slopes of the highlands, which form the main agricultural region of the State
- the arid western plains

These four components are then typically divided into north, central and southern components based upon their location relative to Sydney.

This two-way subdivision gives rise to the generic pattern of regions, and in some cases, subregions:

Informal divisions of New South Wales
Region name	Subregion name	Comments
Sydney Metropolitan	Greater Sydney	A broad region within Sydney's metropolitan area that conjoins the Eastern Suburbs, St George-Sutherland, Macarthur-Wollondilly, North Shore, Northern Beaches, Western Suburbs, Hawkesbury and the Lower Blue Mountains sub-regions of Sydney. Encompassing 33 local government areas, its major districts include Liverpool, Blacktown, Fairfield, Parramatta, Bankstown, Auburn, Penrith, Campbelltown, Hurstville, Cronulla, Mascot, Hornsby, and Manly and among other commercial suburbs across Sydney.
Sydney Metropolitan	Blue Mountains	Generally that mountainous area west of the Nepean River and east of Lithgow, stretching to Capertee Valley in the north, and Wombeyan Caves in the south. The majority of the region is contained within a series of national parks. Katoomba and Blackheath are the main towns.
North Coast	Mid North Coast	extends from Port Stephens at Hawks Nest to as far north as Woolgoolga, near Coffs Harbour. Coffs Harbour and Port Macquarie are small cities.
North Coast	Northern Rivers	North of Woolgoolga to the Queensland border. Towns include Casino and the tourist town of Byron Bay. Small cities of Tweed Heads lies on the border, adjacent the major Queensland city of Gold Coast and Lismore. The climate is humid subtropical, with mild winters and warm-hot summers.
Central Coast	Central Coast	North of the Hawkesbury River to as far north as Lake Macquarie.
Central Coast	Hunter	Lies between the Mid North Coast and the Central Coast, and includes the valley of the Hunter River (which extends far inland between the Northern Tablelands and the Central West), as well as the Newcastle–Lake Macquarie conurbation, the second largest urban area in NSW.
South Coast	Illawarra	Coastal region between Royal National Park and Gerroa. Contains the Wollongong-Shellharbour conurbation, the third largest urban area in NSW, and smaller towns of Kiama and Gerringong.
South Coast	South Coast	East of Monaro and South of Gerroa to the Victorian border. Small city of Nowra, major towns Ulladulla, Bateman's Bay, Merimbula, Eden. Increasingly wild and forested, heading south.
New England	Northern Tablelands	Includes the towns and districts of Tenterfield, Glen Innes, Guyra, Armidale and Walcha. This is an extensive highland region with many areas above 1,000 metres (3,300 ft) in elevation.
New England	North West Slopes	The slopes and plains in the north-central areas of the State, to the west of the Northern Tablelands. Mid-sized city of Tamworth and other towns of Inverell, Narrabri, Moree, Gunnedah, Coonabarabran. A hilly, inland, and rather dry region that marks the transitional zone between the cool, wet highlands of the Northern Tablelands and the hot, dry plains of north-western NSW.
Central West	Central West Slopes	Lower, drier country to the west of the Central Tablelands, around the large towns of Cowra, Parkes, Forbes, Mudgee and other smaller centres which include Wellington, West Wyalong and Condobolin.
Central West	Central Tablelands	That highland region to the west of the Blue Mountains, but not particularly inland, namely around the cities of Bathurst and Orange and the towns of Lithgow and Oberon, meeting its southern limit at the Abercrombie River (from which it forms the Southern Tablelands).
Southern Tablelands	Southern Highlands	That moderately elevated region adjacent the Illawarra, around the towns of Mittagong, Bowral, Moss Vale, Bundanoon and Robertson, as well as the historic town of Berrima.
Southern Tablelands	Capital Country	Taking in the region surrounding Canberra (ACT), including the cities of Queanbeyan and Goulburn and the towns of Crookwell and Yass.
Snowy Mountains	Monaro	Lying on the sub-alpine Monaro plateau, south of the Australian Capital Territory/Canberra and west of the NSW South Coast. Main towns in the region are Cooma, Jindabyne, Berridale and Bombala.
Snowy Mountains	Snowy Mountains	The alpine areas including the ski resorts of Thredbo and Perisher Valley, as well as Cabramurra and the former gold-mining town of Kiandra. This can also be extended north to the Brindabella Range west of Canberra.
Riverina	South West Slopes	Generally taken as being directly west of the Snowy Mountains, in hilly, mountainous areas such as Gundagai, Tumut, Tumbarumba, Batlow and Khancoban, and additionally Young and Boorowa to the north. This Snowy Valleys region can also be extended south to Beechworth in Victoria's North-East. The climate is temperate with a pronounced winter rainfall maximum.
Riverina	Riverina	Lies in the south-centre and south-west of the State, around the Murray (which forms the border with Victoria), Murrumbidgee and Lachlan rivers. The borders and definitions of the region are ill-defined - it may or may not include the South West Slopes, and parts of Victoria are also sometimes considered the Riverina. If Wodonga is included in the region then Albury would be the largest city, followed by Wagga Wagga. Other cities and towns described as being in the Riverina include Griffith, Narrandera, Leeton, Temora, Cootamundra, Hay, Deniliquin, as far north as Hillston and various Victorian settlements on the southern end such as Kyabram.
Far West	Far West	Its only city is Broken Hill and other significant towns are Bourke, Brewarrina, Cobar, Ivanhoe, Balranald and Wentworth. Dry semi-arid climate, becoming a hot desert towards Broken Hill. Aboriginal-majority small town of Wilcannia is the only major settlement in the 450 km between Cobar and Broken Hill.
Orana	Orana / Western Plains	Spanning north-central and north-western NSW, the major localities are Dubbo and Cobar.

== Specific uses of regions for different purposes ==
=== Weather forecasting ===
The Australian Bureau of Meteorology divides New South Wales into sixteen districts.

1. Northern Rivers
2. Mid North Coast
3. Hunter (with the Central Coast)
4. Northern Tablelands
5. Sydney Metropolitan
6. Illawarra
7. South Coast
8. Central Tablelands
9. Southern Tablelands
10. Snowy Mountains
11. North West Slopes & Plains
12. Central West Slopes & Plains
13. South West Slopes
14. Riverina
15. Lower Western
16. Upper Western

=== New South Wales Government ===
==== Department of State and Regional Development ====
The Department of State and Regional Development lists fourteen regions in New South Wales.

- Central Coast
- Central West
- Far South Coast
- Far West
- Greater Sydney
- Hunter
- Illawarra
- Mid North Coast
- Murray
- New England - North West
- Northern Rivers
- Orana
- Riverina

==== Office of Local Government ====
The Office of Local Government listed twelve regions:

- Regional NSW
  - Central Coast
  - Central West
  - Far West
  - Hunter
  - Illawarra
  - Mid North Coast
  - Murray
  - New England
  - Northern Rivers
  - Orana
  - Riverina
  - South Coast and Southern Inland
- Greater Sydney
  - Metropolitan Sydney
  - Outer Metropolitan Sydney

Local governments in New South Wales have created regional groupings. The NSW Regional Organisations of Councils, typically with names like "Western Sydney Regional Organisation of Councils" (WSROC) have the main function of lobbying the State Government on various matters, coordinating economic development, joint purchasing between councils and regional promotion. They have no formal administrative function. There are thirteen networks of regional organisation, in addition to the six networks in Greater Metropolitan Sydney:

- Regional organisation
  - Canberra Region
  - Central Coast
  - Central NSW
  - Far North West
  - Far South West
  - Hunter
  - Illawarra Shoalhaven
  - Mid North Coast
  - Namoi
  - New England
  - Northern Rivers
  - Orana
  - Riverina and Murray
- Metropolitan organisation
  - Shore Region
  - Macarthur Region
  - Northern Sydney Region
  - Southern Sydney Region
  - Western Sydney Region (including Blue Mountains)
  - Sydney Coastal

==== Department of Planning ====
The NSW Department of Planning, Industry and Environment divides New South Wales into ten regions:

- Greater Sydney
- Central Coast
- Central West and Orana
- Far West
- Hunter
- Illawarra Shoalhaven
- New England North West
- North Coast
- Riverina Murray
- South East and Tablelands

==== Ministry of Health ====
The New South Wales Ministry of Health divided New South Wales into fifteen separate regions, called Local Health Districts. These are:

- Metropolitan Local Health Districts
  - Nepean Blue Mountains
  - Northern Sydney
  - South Eastern Sydney
  - South Western Sydney
  - Sydney
  - Western Sydney
- Rural & Regional NSW Local Health Districts
  - Central Coast
  - Far West
  - Hunter New England
  - Illawarra Shoalhaven
  - Mid North Coast
  - Murrumbidgee
  - Northern NSW
  - Southern NSW
  - Western NSW

Additionally, a small number of non-geographic specialty networks cover paediatric health, justice and forensic health, and the St' Vincent's Health network.

==== New South Wales Police Force ====
The New South Wales Police Force is organised into approximately 81 local area commands, which are aggregated into six regions:

- Greater Sydney
  - Central Metro Region
  - North West Metro Region
  - Southwest Metro Region
- Regional NSW
  - Northern Region
  - Southern Region
  - Western Region

==== New South Wales National Parks and Wildlife Service ====
The NSW National Parks & Wildlife Service uses the Interim Biogeographic Regionalisation for Australia bioregions based on ecological factors. These bioregions extend into neighbouring States.

=== Australia travel ===
Yet another subdivision of New South Wales into regions is as follows:

- Sydney
- Central Coast
- Hunter
- Blue Mountains
- Southern Highlands
- Snowy Mountains
- Illawarra
- South Coast
- Capital Country (similar to Southern Tablelands in other lists)
- Northern Rivers
- North Coast NSW (which is actually what other lists call the Mid North Coast)
- New England North West (Northern Tablelands and North West Slopes)
- Central New South Wales
- Riverina
- The Murray
- Outback New South Wales

This classification subdivides the most commonly accepted notion of "The Riverina" into two separate regions, "Riverina" and "The Murray". The "Blue Mountains" is also included as it own distinct region, which is usually considered a district of the state capital "Sydney".

== See also ==
- Regions of Sydney
- Regional Organisations of Councils
- NSW Regional Organisations of Councils
- Western Sydney Regional Organisation of Councils
