= New England Tablelands =

New England Tablelands may refer to

- Northern Tablelands, a region in the Australian state of New South Wales
- New England Tablelands bioregion, a bioregion mostly in the Northern Tablelands
