= Interim Biogeographic Regionalisation for Australia =

Biogeographic regionalisation of Australia

IBRA version 7.1 map

The Interim Biogeographic Regionalisation for Australia (IBRA) is a biogeographic regionalisation of Australia developed by the Australian government's Department of Sustainability, Environment, Water, Population, and Communities. It was developed for use as a planning tool, for example for the establishment of a national reserve system. The first version of IBRA was developed in 1993–94 and published in 1995.

Within the broadest scale, Australia is a major part of the Australasia biogeographic realm, as developed by the World Wide Fund for Nature. Based on this system, the world is also split into 14 terrestrial habitats, also called biomes, of which eight are shared by Australia. The Australian land mass is divided into 89 bioregions and 419 subregions. Each region is a land area made up of a group of interacting ecosystems that are repeated in similar form across the landscape.

IBRA is updated periodically based on new data, mapping improvements, and review of the existing scheme. The most recent version is IBRA7, developed during 2012, which replaced IBRA6.1.

== IBRA regions and subregions ==
This is a list of region and subregions under IBRA7. Region codes are given in parentheses, followed by area, where known. Images of regions are from IBRA6.1, pending creation of maps for IBRA7.

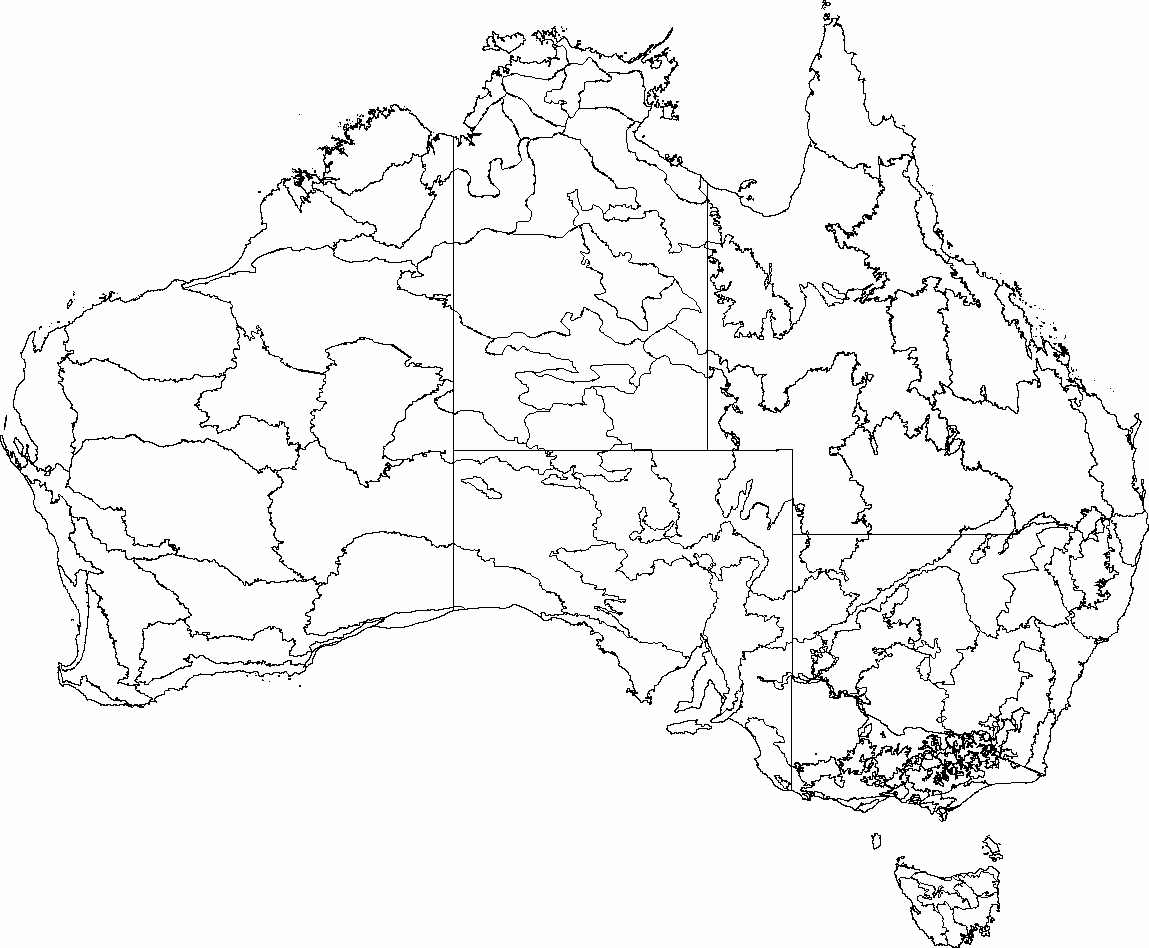
IBRA 6.1 regions map

=== A ===
IBRA regions and subregions: IBRA7
IBRA region / subregion	IBRA code	Area	States	Location in Australia
Arnhem Coast	ARC	3,335,669 hectares (8,242,620 acres)	NT	
Murgenella	ARC01	113,180 ha (279,700 acres)	NT	
Maningrida	ARC02	1,741,376 ha (4,303,030 acres)	NT	
Nhulunbuy	ARC03	1,159,659 ha (2,865,580 acres)	NT	
Groote	ARC04	268,735 ha (664,060 acres)	NT	
Wessels	ARC05	52,720 ha (130,300 acres)	NT	
Arnhem Plateau	ARP	2,306,023 hectares (5,698,310 acres)	NT	
Alligator	ARP01	1,038,621 ha (2,566,490 acres)	NT	
Mainoru	ARP02	1,267,401 ha (3,131,820 acres)	NT	
Australian Alps	AUA	1,232,981 hectares (3,046,760 acres)	NSW, VIC	
Snowy Mountains	AUA01	713,114 ha (1,762,140 acres)	NSW, VIC	
Victorian Alps	AUA02	519,866 ha (1,284,620 acres)	NSW, VIC	
Avon Wheatbelt	AVW	9,517,104 hectares (23,517,280 acres)	WA	
Merredin	AVW01	6,524,175 ha (16,121,590 acres)	WA	
Katanning	AVW02	2,992,929 ha (7,395,690 acres)	WA	

=== B ===
IBRA regions and subregions: IBRA7
IBRA region / subregion	IBRA code	Area	States	Location in Australia
Ben Lomond	BEL	657,500 hectares (1,625,000 acres)	TAS	
Ben Lomond (subregion)	BEL01	657,500 hectares (1,625,000 acres)	TAS	
Brigalow Belt North	BBN	33,790,510 hectares (83,498,200 acres)	QLD	
Townsville Plains	BBN01	763,495 ha (1,886,640 acres)	QLD	
Bogie River Hills	BBN02	1,054,392 ha (2,605,460 acres)	QLD	
Cape River Hills	BBN03	747,393 ha (1,846,850 acres)	QLD	
Beucazon Hills	BBN04	95,821 ha (236,780 acres)	QLD	
Wyarra Hills	BBN05	397,935 ha (983,320 acres)	QLD	
Northern Bowen Basin	BBN06	1,316,957 ha (3,254,270 acres)	QLD	
Belyando Downs	BBN07	1,772,127 ha (4,379,020 acres)	QLD	
Upper Belyando Floodout	BBN08	466,275 ha (1,152,190 acres)	QLD	
Anakie Inlier	BBN09	382,284 ha (944,640 acres)	QLD	
Basalt Downs	BBN10	1,274,731 ha (3,149,930 acres)	QLD	
Isaac-Comet Downs	BBN11	2,693,397 ha (6,655,530 acres)	QLD	
Nebo-Connors Ranges	BBN12	449,269 ha (1,110,170 acres)	QLD	
South Drummond Basin	BBN13	1,009,244 ha (2,493,900 acres)	QLD	
Marlborough Plains	BBN14	1,250,611 ha (3,090,330 acres)	QLD	
Brigalow Belt South	BBS	27,219,776 hectares (67,261,530 acres)	QLD / NSW	
Claude River Downs	BBS01	1,026,214 ha (2,535,830 acres)	QLD / NSW	
Woorabinda	BBS02	749,785 ha (1,852,760 acres)	QLD / NSW	
Boomer Range	BBS03	220,541 ha (544,970 acres)	QLD / NSW	
Mount Morgan Ranges	BBS04	1,275,970 ha (3,153,000 acres)	QLD / NSW	
Callide Creek Downs	BBS05	30,133 ha (74,460 acres)	QLD / NSW	
Arcadia	BBS06	715,288 ha (1,767,520 acres)	QLD / NSW	
Dawson River Downs	BBS07	982,807 ha (2,428,570 acres)	QLD / NSW	
Banana-Auburn Ranges	BBS08	1,547,555 ha (3,824,090 acres)	QLD / NSW	
Buckland Basalts	BBS09	281,306 ha (695,120 acres)	QLD / NSW	
Carnarvon Ranges	BBS10	2,263,686 ha (5,593,690 acres)	QLD / NSW	
Taroom Downs	BBS11	652,005 ha (1,611,140 acres)	QLD / NSW	
Southern Downs	BBS12	4,264,666 ha (10,538,220 acres)	QLD / NSW	
Barakula	BBS13	1,301,712 ha (3,216,600 acres)	QLD / NSW	
Dulacca Downs	BBS14	162,442 ha (401,400 acres)	QLD / NSW	
Weribone High	BBS15	966,510 ha (2,388,300 acres)	QLD / NSW	
Tara Downs	BBS16	511,339 ha (1,263,550 acres)	QLD / NSW	
Eastern Darling Downs	BBS17	1,697,945 ha (4,195,710 acres)	QLD / NSW	
Inglewood Sandstones	BBS18	1,219,008 ha (3,012,230 acres)	QLD / NSW	
Moonie-Commoron Floodout	BBS19	750,661 ha (1,854,920 acres)	QLD / NSW	
Moonie-Barwon Interfluve	BBS20	765,231 ha (1,890,930 acres)	QLD / NSW	
Northern Basalts	BBS21	624,671 ha (1,543,600 acres)	QLD / NSW	
Northern Outwash	BBS22	700,241 ha (1,730,330 acres)	QLD / NSW	
Pilliga Outwash	BBS23	535,392 ha (1,322,980 acres)	QLD / NSW	
Pilliga	BBS24	1,732,137 ha (4,280,200 acres)	QLD / NSW	
Liverpool Plains	BBS25	941,752 ha (2,327,120 acres)	QLD / NSW	
Liverpool Range	BBS26	521,960 ha (1,289,800 acres)	QLD / NSW	
Talbragar Valley	BBS27	203,894 ha (503,830 acres)	QLD / NSW	
Narrandool	BBS28	303,754 ha (750,590 acres)	QLD / NSW	
Broken Hill Complex	BHC	5,635,422 hectares (13,925,430 acres)	SA / NSW	
Barrier Range	BHC01	1,802,996 ha (4,455,300 acres)	SA / NSW	
Mootwingee Downs	BHC02	630,694 ha (1,558,480 acres)	SA / NSW	
Scopes Range	BHC03	260,806 ha (644,470 acres)	SA / NSW	
Barrier Range Outwash	BHC04	1,954,973 ha (4,830,840 acres)	SA / NSW	
Bimbowrie	BHC05	279,258 ha (690,060 acres)	SA / NSW	
Curnamona	BHC06	706,696 ha (1,746,280 acres)	SA / NSW	
Burt Plain	BRT	7,379,719 hectares (18,235,680 acres)	NT	
Yuendumu	BRT01	2,931,061 ha (7,242,810 acres)	NT	
Atartinga	BRT02	3,531,111 ha (8,725,570 acres)	NT	
Mount Chapple	BRT03	390,981 ha (966,140 acres)	NT	
Dulcie	BRT04	526,567 ha (1,301,180 acres)	NT	

=== C ===
IBRA regions and subregions: IBRA7
IBRA region / subregion	IBRA code	Area	States	Location in Australia
Cape York Peninsula	CYP	12,256,457 hectares (30,286,360 acres)	QLD	
Coen - Yambo Inlier	CYP01	2,312,126 hectares (5,713,390 acres)	QLD	
Starke Coastal Lowlands	CYP02	512,498 hectares (1,266,410 acres)	QLD	
Cape York - Torres Strait	CYP03	94,367 hectares (233,190 acres)	QLD	
Jardine - Pascoe Sandstones	CYP04	1,444,223 hectares (3,568,750 acres)	QLD	
Battle Camp Sandstones	CYP05	504,409 hectares (1,246,420 acres)	QLD	
Laura Lowlands	CYP06	1,791,228 hectares (4,426,220 acres)	QLD	
Weipa Plateau	CYP07	2,848,753 hectares (7,039,420 acres)	QLD	
(Northern) Holroyd Plain	CYP08	2,464,074 hectares (6,088,860 acres)	QLD	
Coastal Plains	CYP09	284,780 hectares (703,700 acres)	QLD	
Carnarvon	CAR	8,430,172 hectares (20,831,410 acres)	WA	
Cape Range	CAR01	2,380,498 hectares (5,882,340 acres)	WA	
Wooramel	CAR02	6,049,674 hectares (14,949,070 acres)	WA	
Central Arnhem	CEA	3,462,433 hectares (8,555,860 acres)	NT	
Wilton	CEA01	3,137,973 hectares (7,754,100 acres)	NT	
Parson	CEA02	324,460 hectares (801,800 acres)	NT	
Central Kimberley	CEK	7,675,587 hectares (18,966,790 acres)	WA	
Pentecost	CEK01	4,397,260 hectares (10,865,900 acres)	WA	
Hart	CEK02	2,324,667 hectares (5,744,380 acres)	WA	
Mount Eliza (Kimberley)	CEK03	953,661 hectares (2,356,550 acres)	WA	
Central Mackay Coast	CMC	1,464,208 hectares (3,618,140 acres)	QLD	
Whitsunday	CMC01	89,179 hectares (220,370 acres)	QLD	
Proserpine - Sarina Lowlands	CMC02	466,498 hectares (1,152,740 acres)	QLD	
Clarke - Connors Ranges	CMC03	631,985 hectares (1,561,670 acres)	QLD	
Byfield	CMC04	127,697 hectares (315,550 acres)	QLD	
Manifold	CMC05	67,885 hectares (167,750 acres)	QLD	
Debella	CMC06	80,964 hectares (200,070 acres)	QLD	
Central Ranges	CER	10,164,044 hectares (25,115,900 acres)	WA, NT, SA	
Mann-Musgrave Block	CER01	9,214,685 hectares (22,769,980 acres)	WA, NT, SA	
Wataru	CER02	423,360 hectares (1,046,100 acres)	WA, NT, SA	
Everard Block	CER03	525,998 hectares (1,299,770 acres)	WA, NT, SA	
Channel Country	CHC	30,409,437 hectares (75,143,360 acres)	NT, QLD, NSW, SA	
Toko Plains	CHC01	2,825,712 hectares (6,982,490 acres)	NT, QLD, NSW, SA	
Sturt Stony Desert	CHC02	8,945,360 hectares (22,104,500 acres)	NT, QLD, NSW, SA	
Goneaway Tablelands	CHC03	5,182,219 hectares (12,805,540 acres)	NT, QLD, NSW, SA	
Diamantina-Eyre	CHC04	1,456,544 hectares (3,599,200 acres)	NT, QLD, NSW, SA	
Cooper-Diamantina Plains	CHC05	4,136,121 hectares (10,220,580 acres)	NT, QLD, NSW, SA	
Coongie	CHC06	1,736,594 hectares (4,291,220 acres)	NT, QLD, NSW, SA	
Lake Pure	CHC07	1,204,027 hectares (2,975,220 acres)	NT, QLD, NSW, SA	
Noccundra Slopes	CHC08	1,798,759 hectares (4,444,830 acres)	NT, QLD, NSW, SA	
Tibooburra Downs	CHC09		NT, QLD, NSW, SA	
Core Ranges	CHC10	139,224 hectares (344,030 acres)	NT, QLD, NSW, SA	
Bulloo	CHC11	1,077,480 hectares (2,662,500 acres)	NT, QLD, NSW, SA	
Bulloo Dunefields	CHC12	1,326,712 hectares (3,278,380 acres)	NT, QLD, NSW, SA	
Central Depression	CHC13	580,685 hectares (1,434,900 acres)	NT, QLD, NSW, SA	
Cobar Peneplain	COP	7,385,346 hectares (18,249,590 acres)	NSW	
Boorindal Plains	COP1	400,236 hectares (989,000 acres)	NSW	
Barnato Downs	COP2	1,773,542 hectares (4,382,520 acres)	NSW	
Canbelego Downs	COP3	2,001,425 hectares (4,945,630 acres)	NSW	
Nymagee	COP4	2,070,061 hectares (5,115,230 acres)	NSW	
Lachlan Plains	COP5	1,140,082 hectares (2,817,200 acres)	NSW	
Coolgardie	COO	12,912,209 hectares (31,906,760 acres)	WA	
Mardabilla	COO1	1,843,125 hectares (4,554,460 acres)	WA	
Southern Cross	COO2	6,010,838 hectares (14,853,100 acres)	WA	
Eastern Goldfields	COO3	5,058,246 hectares (12,499,200 acres)	WA	
Coral Sea	COS	17,167 hectares (42,420 acres)		

=== D ===
IBRA regions and subregions: IBRA7
IBRA region / subregion	IBRA code	Area	States	Location in Australia
Daly Basin	DAB	2,092,229 hectares (5,170,010 acres)	NT	
Daly Basin	DAB01	2,092,229 hectares (5,170,010 acres)	NT	
Dampierland	DAL	8,360,871 hectares (20,660,160 acres)	WA	
Fitzroy Trough	DAL01	3,432,084 hectares (8,480,860 acres)	WA	
Pindanland	DAL02	4,928,787 hectares (12,179,300 acres)	WA	
Darling Riverine Plains	DRP	10,699,769 hectares (26,439,710 acres)	QLD / NSW	
Culgoa-Bokhara	DRP01	1,354,799 hectares (3,347,780 acres)	QLD / NSW	
Warrambool-Moonie	DRP02	1,151,637 hectares (2,845,760 acres)	QLD / NSW	
Castlereagh-Barwon	DRP03	4,500,355 hectares (11,120,620 acres)	QLD / NSW	
Bogan-Macquarie	DRP04	1,999,951 hectares (4,941,990 acres)	QLD / NSW	
Louth Plains	DRP05	276,573 hectares (683,430 acres)	QLD / NSW	
Wilcannia Plains	DRP06	504,562 hectares (1,246,800 acres)	QLD / NSW	
Menindee	DRP07	653,935 hectares (1,615,910 acres)	QLD / NSW	
Great Darling Anabranch	DRP08	147,138 hectares (363,590 acres)	QLD / NSW	
Pooncarie-Darling	DRP09	110,819 hectares (273,840 acres)	QLD / NSW	
Darwin Coastal	DAC	2,843,199 hectares (7,025,700 acres)	NT	
Darwin Coastal	DAC01	2,843,199 hectares (7,025,700 acres)	NT	
Davenport Murchison Ranges	DMR	5,805,108 hectares (14,344,730 acres)	NT	
Ashburton Range	DMR01	1,218,621 hectares (3,011,280 acres)	NT	
Davenport	DMR02	1,589,590 hectares (3,928,000 acres)	NT	
Barkly	DMR03	2,996,897 hectares (7,405,490 acres)	NT	
Desert Uplands	DEU	6,941,095 hectares (17,151,820 acres)	QLD	
Prairie-Torrens Creeks Alluvials	DEU01	1,580,384 hectares (3,905,210 acres)	QLD	
Alice Tableland	DEU02	2,866,760 hectares (7,083,900 acres)	QLD	
Cape-Campaspe Plains	DEU03	1,007,026 hectares (2,488,420 acres)	QLD	
Jericho	DEU04	1,486,926 hectares (3,674,270 acres)	QLD	

=== E ===
IBRA regions and subregions: IBRA7
IBRA region / subregion	IBRA code	Area	States	Location in Australia
Einasleigh Uplands	EIU	11,625,726 hectares (28,727,790 acres)	QLD	
Georgetown - Croydon	EIU01	1,041,407 hectares (2,573,370 acres)	QLD	
Kidston	EIU02	2,929,528 hectares (7,239,020 acres)	QLD	
Hodgkinson Basin	EIU03	1,607,221 hectares (3,971,530 acres)	QLD	
Broken River	EIU04	3,309,590 hectares (8,178,200 acres)	QLD	
Undara - Toomba Basalts	EIU05	2,076,208 hectares (5,130,420 acres)	QLD	
Herberton - Wairuna	EIU06	661,771 hectares (1,635,270 acres)	QLD	
Esperance Plains	ESP	2,921,327 hectares (7,218,760 acres)	WA	
Fitzgerald	ESP01	1,577,938 hectares (3,899,170 acres)	WA	
Recherche	ESP02	1,343,390 hectares (3,319,600 acres)	WA	
Eyre Yorke Block	EYB	6,120,409 hectares (15,123,860 acres)	SA	
Southern Yorke	EYB01	438,470 hectares (1,083,500 acres)	SA	
St Vincent	EYB02	1,093,789 hectares (2,702,810 acres)	SA	
Eyre Hills	EYB03	1,172,576 hectares (2,897,500 acres)	SA	
Talia	EYB04	1,096,175 hectares (2,708,710 acres)	SA	
Eyre Mallee	EYB05	2,319,398 hectares (5,731,360 acres)	SA	

=== F ===
IBRA regions and subregions: IBRA7
IBRA region / subregion	IBRA code	Area	States	Location in Australia
Finke	FIN	7,267,416 hectares (17,958,180 acres)	NT / SA	
Henbury	FIN01	2,257,063 hectares (5,577,320 acres)	NT / SA	
Finke River	FIN02	1,601,516 hectares (3,957,430 acres)	NT / SA	
Tieyon	FIN03	2,505,610 hectares (6,191,500 acres)	NT / SA	
Pedirka	FIN04	903,228 hectares (2,231,920 acres)	NT / SA	
Flinders Lofty Block	FLB	6,615,765 hectares (16,347,910 acres)	SA / NSW	
Mount Lofty Ranges	FLB01	300,580 hectares (742,700 acres)	SA / NSW	
Broughton	FLB02	1,032,918 hectares (2,552,400 acres)	SA / NSW	
Olary Spur	FLB02	1,745,479 hectares (4,313,170 acres)	SA / NSW	
Southern Flinders	FLB04	728,317 hectares (1,799,710 acres)	SA / NSW	
Northern Flinders	FLB05	1,846,804 hectares (4,563,550 acres)	SA / NSW	
Central Flinders	FLB06	961,667 hectares (2,376,330 acres)	SA / NSW	
Furneaux	FUR	537,543 hectares (1,328,300 acres)	TAS / VIC	
Wilsons Promontory	FUR01	41,144 hectares (101,670 acres)	TAS / VIC	
Flinders	FUR02	496,398 hectares (1,226,630 acres)	TAS / VIC	

=== G ===
IBRA regions and subregions: IBRA7
IBRA region / subregion	IBRA code	Area	States	Location in Australia
Gascoyne	GAS	18,075,257 hectares (44,664,930 acres)	WA	
Ashburton	GAS01	3,687,030 hectares (9,110,800 acres)	WA	
Carnegie	GAS02	4,718,656 hectares (11,660,050 acres)	WA	
Augustus	GAS03	9,669,571 hectares (23,894,030 acres)	WA	
Gawler	GAW	12,002,883 hectares (29,659,770 acres)	SA	
Myall Plains	GAW01	1,088,767 hectares (2,690,400 acres)	SA	
Gawler Volcanics	GAW02	1,556,182 hectares (3,845,410 acres)	SA	
Gawler Lakes	GAW03	2,049,193 hectares (5,063,670 acres)	SA	
Arcoona Plateau	GAW04	1,089,865 hectares (2,693,120 acres)	SA	
Kingoonya	GAW05	1,922,414 hectares (4,750,390 acres)	SA	
Torrens	GAW06	1,439,093 hectares (3,556,080 acres)	SA	
Roxby	GAW07	1,409,305 hectares (3,482,470 acres)	SA	
Commonwealth Hill	GAW08	1,448,062 hectares (3,578,240 acres)	SA	
Geraldton Sandplains	GES	3,142,149 hectares (7,764,420 acres)	WA	
Geraldton Hills	GES01	1,969,997 hectares (4,867,970 acres)	WA	
Leseur Sandplain	GES02	1,172,152 hectares (2,896,450 acres)	WA	
Gibson Desert	GID	15,628,918 hectares (38,619,900 acres)	WA	
Lateritic Plain	GID01	12,714,805 hectares (31,418,970 acres)	WA	
Dune Field	GID02	2,914,114 hectares (7,200,930 acres)	WA	
Great Sandy Desert	GSD	39,486,135 hectares (97,572,360 acres)	NT / WA	
McLarty	GSD01	12,316,754 hectares (30,435,360 acres)	NT / WA	
Mackay	GSD02	25,698,395 hectares (63,502,120 acres)	NT / WA	
Ehrenberg	GSD03	375,668 hectares (928,300 acres)	NT / WA	
Amedeus	GSD04	722,845 hectares (1,786,190 acres)	NT / WA	
Lake Bennett	GSD05	289,541 hectares (715,470 acres)	NT / WA	
Lake Lewis	GSD06	82,932 hectares (204,930 acres)	NT / WA	
Great Victoria Desert	GVD	42,246,564 hectares (104,393,530 acres)	SA / WA	
Shield	GVD01	4,741,854 hectares (11,717,380 acres)	SA / WA	
Central	GVD02	12,590,867 hectares (31,112,710 acres)	SA / WA	
Maralinga	GVD03	11,460,762 hectares (28,320,160 acres)	SA / WA	
Kintore	GVD04	4,961,542 hectares (12,260,240 acres)	SA / WA	
Tallaringa	GVD05	3,663,149 hectares (9,051,840 acres)	SA / WA	
Yellabinna	GVD06	4,828,389 hectares (11,931,210 acres)	SA / WA	
Gulf Coastal	GUC	2,711,718 hectares (6,700,800 acres)	NT	
Limmen	GUC01	12,714,805 hectares (31,418,970 acres)	NT	
Pellews	GUC02	2,914,114 hectares (7,200,930 acres)	NT	
Gulf Fall and Uplands	GFU	11,847,909 hectares (29,276,820 acres)	NT / QLD	
McArthur	GFU01	9,330,938 hectares (23,057,250 acres)	NT / QLD	
Nicholson	GFU02	2,516,971 hectares (6,219,570 acres)	NT / QLD	
Gulf Plains	GUP	22,041,825 hectares (54,466,540 acres)	NT / QLD	
Karumba Plains	GUP01	1,057,366 hectares (2,612,810 acres)	NT / QLD	
Armraynald Plains	GUP02	1,589,437 hectares (3,927,580 acres)	NT / QLD	
Woondoola Plains	GUP03	2,375,110 hectares (5,869,000 acres)	NT / QLD	
Mitchell-Gilbert Fans	GUP04	5,262,816 hectares (13,004,700 acres)	NT / QLD	
Claraville Plains	GUP05	3,738,013 hectares (9,236,830 acres)	NT / QLD	
Holroyd Plain-Red Plateau	GUP06	2,208,468 hectares (5,457,240 acres)	NT / QLD	
Doomadgee Plains	GUP07	1,831,823 hectares (4,526,530 acres)	NT / QLD	
Donors Plateau	GUP08	2,449,964 hectares (6,053,990 acres)	NT / QLD	
Gilberton Plateau	GUP09	1,403,937 hectares (3,469,200 acres)	NT / QLD	
Wellesley Islands	GUP10	124,893 hectares (308,620 acres)	NT / QLD	

=== H ===
IBRA regions and subregions: IBRA7
IBRA region / subregion	IBRA code	Area	States	Location in Australia
Hampton	HAM	1,088,198 hectares (2,689,000 acres)	SA, WA	
Hampton	HAM01	1,088,198 hectares (2,689,000 acres)	SA, WA	

=== I ===
IBRA regions and subregions: IBRA7
IBRA region / subregion	IBRA code	Area	States	Location in Australia
Indian Tropical Islands	ITI	27,329 hectares (67,530 acres)		
Christmas Island	ITI01	13,664 hectares (33,760 acres)		
Cocos Islands	ITI02	1,463 hectares (3,620 acres)		
Timor Sea Coral Islands	ITI03	12,203 hectares (30,150 acres)		

=== J ===
IBRA regions and subregions: IBRA7
IBRA region / subregion	IBRA code	Area	States	Location in Australia
Jarrah Forest	JAF	4,509,074 hectares (11,142,160 acres)	WA	
Northern Jarrah Forest	JAF01	1,898,799 hectares (4,692,030 acres)	WA	
Southern Jarrah Forest	JAF02	2,610,275 hectares (6,450,130 acres)	WA	

=== K ===
IBRA regions and subregions: IBRA7
IBRA region / subregion	IBRA code	Area	States	Location in Australia
Kanmantoo	KAN	812,415 hectares (2,007,520 acres)	SA	
Kangaroo Island	KAN01	441,685 hectares (1,091,430 acres)	SA	
Fleurieu	KAN02	370,730 hectares (916,100 acres)	SA	
King	KIN	425,567 hectares (1,051,600 acres)	TAS	
King	KIN01	425,567 hectares (1,051,600 acres)	TAS	

=== L ===
IBRA regions and subregions: IBRA7
IBRA region / subregion	IBRA code	Area	States	Location in Australia
Little Sandy Desert	LSD	11,089,857 hectares (27,403,630 acres)	WA	
Rudall	LSD01	991,277 hectares (2,449,500 acres)	WA	
Trainor	LSD02	10,098,580 hectares (24,954,100 acres)	WA	

=== M ===
IBRA regions and subregions: IBRA7
IBRA region / subregion	IBRA code	Area	States	Location in Australia
MacDonnell Ranges	MAC	3,929,444 hectares (9,709,870 acres)	NT	
McDonnell	MAC01	1,483,959 hectares (3,666,940 acres)	NT	
Watarrka	MAC02	1,092,782 hectares (2,700,320 acres)	NT	
Hartz Range	MAC03	1,352,702 hectares (3,342,600 acres)	NT	
Mallee	MAL	7,397,559 hectares (18,279,770 acres)	WA	
Eastern Mallee	MAL01	3,415,839 hectares (8,440,720 acres)	WA	
Western Mallee	MAL02	3,981,720 hectares (9,839,000 acres)	WA	
Mitchell Grass Downs	MGD	33,468,761 hectares (82,703,110 acres)	NT / QLD	
Sylvester	MGD01	1,153,283 hectares (2,849,820 acres)	NT / QLD	
Barkly Tableland	MGD02	9,479,612 hectares (23,424,630 acres)	NT / QLD	
Georgina Limestone	MGD03	2,292,026 hectares (5,663,720 acres)	NT / QLD	
Southwestern Downs	MGD04	3,715,454 hectares (9,181,090 acres)	NT / QLD	
Kynuna Plateau	MGD05	2,293,311 hectares (5,666,890 acres)	NT / QLD	
Northern Downs	MGD06	435,263 hectares (1,075,560 acres)	NT / QLD	
Central Downs	MGD07	9,378,817 hectares (23,175,560 acres)	NT / QLD	
Southern Wooded Downs	MGD08	4,720,995 hectares (11,665,830 acres)	NT / QLD	
Mount Isa Inlier	MII	6,778,263 hectares (16,749,450 acres)	QLD	
Southwestern Plateaus and Floodouts	MII01	1,333,519 hectares (3,295,200 acres)	QLD	
Thorntonia	MII02	802,892 hectares (1,983,990 acres)	QLD	
Mount Isa	MII03	4,641,851 hectares (11,470,260 acres)	QLD	
Mulga Lands	MUL	25,188,333 hectares (62,241,730 acres)	NSW / QLD	
West Balonne Plains	MUL01	1,991,194 hectares (4,920,350 acres)	NSW / QLD	
Eastern Mulga Plains	MUL02	1,563,269 hectares (3,862,920 acres)	NSW / QLD	
Nebine Plains, Block Range	MUL03	1,898,731 hectares (4,691,870 acres)	NSW / QLD	
North Eastern Plains	MUL04	660,369 hectares (1,631,810 acres)	NSW / QLD	
Warrego Plains	MUL05	2,492,085 hectares (6,158,080 acres)	NSW / QLD	
Langlo Plains	MUL06	1,290,484 hectares (3,188,860 acres)	NSW / QLD	
Cuttaburra-Paroo	MUL07	1,703,985 hectares (4,210,640 acres)	NSW / QLD	
West Warrego	MUL08	4,790,087 hectares (11,836,560 acres)	NSW / QLD	
Northern Uplands	MUL09	1,147,549 hectares (2,835,660 acres)	NSW / QLD	
West Bulloo	MUL10	2,852,104 hectares (7,047,700 acres)	NSW / QLD	
Urisino Sandplains	MUL11	2,007,350 hectares (4,960,300 acres)	NSW / QLD	
Warrego Sands	MUL12	479,471 hectares (1,184,800 acres)	NSW / QLD	
Kerribree Basin	MUL13	399,576 hectares (987,370 acres)	NSW / QLD	
White Cliffs Plateau	MUL14	1,074,309 hectares (2,654,680 acres)	NSW / QLD	
Paroo Overflow	MUL15	301,217 hectares (744,320 acres)	NSW / QLD	
Paroo-Darling Sands	MUL16	536,556 hectares (1,325,860 acres)	NSW / QLD	
Murchison	MUR	28,120,554 hectares (69,487,400 acres)	WA	
Eastern Murchison	MUR01	21,135,040 hectares (52,225,800 acres)	WA	
Western Murchison	MUR02	6,985,514 hectares (17,261,580 acres)	WA	
Murray Darling Depression	MDD	19,958,349 hectares (49,318,150 acres)	NSW, SA, VIC	
South Olary Plain	MDD01	5,439,224 hectares (13,440,620 acres)	NSW, SA, VIC	
Murray Mallee	MDD02	5,037,583 hectares (12,448,140 acres)	NSW, SA, VIC	
Murray Lakes and Coorong	MDD03	249,191 hectares (615,760 acres)	NSW, SA, VIC	
Lowan Mallee	MDD04	2,391,719 hectares (5,910,070 acres)	NSW, SA, VIC	
Wimmera	MDD05	2,145,380 hectares (5,301,300 acres)	NSW, SA, VIC	
Darling Depression	MDD06	3,662,438 hectares (9,050,080 acres)	NSW, SA, VIC	
Braemer	MDD07	1,032,815 hectares (2,552,140 acres)	NSW, SA, VIC	

=== N ===
IBRA regions and subregions: IBRA7
IBRA region / subregion	IBRA code	Area	States	Location in Australia
Nandewar	NAN	2,701,977 hectares (6,676,730 acres)	NSW / QLD	
Nandewar Northern Complex	NAN01	962,254 hectares (2,377,780 acres)	NSW / QLD	
Inverell Basalts	NAN02	230,854 hectares (570,450 acres)	NSW / QLD	
Kaputar	NAN03	78,307 hectares (193,500 acres)	NSW / QLD	
Peel	NAN04	1,430,562 hectares (3,535,000 acres)	NSW / QLD	
Naracoorte Coastal Plain	NCP	2,458,215 hectares (6,074,380 acres)	SA / VIC	
Bridgewater	NCP01	463,723 hectares (1,145,880 acres)	SA / VIC	
Glenelg Plain	NCP02	554,775 hectares (1,370,880 acres)	SA / VIC	
Lucindale	NCP03	731,656 hectares (1,807,960 acres)	SA / VIC	
Tintinara	NCP04	708,061 hectares (1,749,660 acres)	SA / VIC	
New England Tablelands	NET	3,002,213 hectares (7,418,630 acres)	NSW	
Bundarra Downs	NET01	151,867 hectares (375,270 acres)	NSW	
Beardy River Hills	NET02	24,625 hectares (60,850 acres)	NSW	
Walcha Plateau	NET03	473,825 hectares (1,170,850 acres)	NSW	
Armidale Plateau	NET04	290,577 hectares (718,030 acres)	NSW	
Wongwibinda Plateau	NET05	106,929 hectares (264,230 acres)	NSW	
Deepwater Downs	NET06	97,773 hectares (241,600 acres)	NSW	
Glenn Innes-Guyra Basalts	NET07	277,299 hectares (685,220 acres)	NSW	
Ebor Basalts	NET08	35,709 hectares (88,240 acres)	NSW	
Moredun Volcanics	NET09	117,461 hectares (290,250 acres)	NSW	
Severn River Volcanics	NET10	150,795 hectares (372,620 acres)	NSW	
Northeast Forest Lands	NET11	206,492 hectares (510,250 acres)	NSW	
Tenterfield Plateau	NET12	139,242 hectares (344,070 acres)	NSW	
Yarrowyck-Kentucky Downs	NET13	65,135 hectares (160,950 acres)	NSW	
Binghi Plateau	NET14	64,555 hectares (159,520 acres)	NSW	
Stanthorpe Plateau	NET15	267,999 hectares (662,240 acres)	NSW	
Eastern Nandewars	NET16	319,096 hectares (788,500 acres)	NSW	
Tingha Plateau	NET17	78,461 hectares (193,880 acres)	NSW	
Nightcap	NET18	113,767 hectares (281,120 acres)	NSW	
Round Mountain	NET19	20,606 hectares (50,920 acres)	NSW	
Northern Kimberley	NOK	8,420,100 hectares (20,807,000 acres)	WA	
Mitchell	NOK01	5,970,915 hectares (14,754,450 acres)	WA	
Berkeley	NOK02	2,449,185 hectares (6,052,070 acres)	WA	
NSW North Coast	NNC	3,996,591 hectares (9,875,790 acres)	NSW	
Washpool	NNC01	59,377 hectares (146,720 acres)	NSW	
Cataract	NNC02	121,338 hectares (299,830 acres)	NSW	
Dalmorton	NNC03	316,458 hectares (781,980 acres)	NSW	
Chaelundi	NNC04	188,279 hectares (465,250 acres)	NSW	
Yuraygir	NNC05	45,815 hectares (113,210 acres)	NSW	
Coffs Coast and Escarpment	NNC06	308,115 hectares (761,370 acres)	NSW	
Macleay Hastings	NNC07	729,170 hectares (1,801,800 acres)	NSW	
Carrai Plateau	NNC08	20,100 hectares (50,000 acres)	NSW	
Macleay Gorges	NNC09	153,349 hectares (378,930 acres)	NSW	
Upper Manning	NNC10	83,181 hectares (205,540 acres)	NSW	
Comboyne Plateau	NNC11	123,315 hectares (304,720 acres)	NSW	
Mummel Escarpment	NNC12	400,916 hectares (990,690 acres)	NSW	
Barrington	NNC13	110,903 hectares (274,050 acres)	NSW	
Tomalla	NNC14	227,615 hectares (562,450 acres)	NSW	
Ellerston	NNC15	113,183 hectares (279,680 acres)	NSW	
Upper Hunter	NNC16	232,750 hectares (575,100 acres)	NSW	
Karuah Manning	NNC17	602,423 hectares (1,488,620 acres)	NSW	
Rocky River Gorge	NNC18	86,829 hectares (214,560 acres)	NSW	
Guy Fawkes	NNC19	73,477 hectares (181,570 acres)	NSW	
NSW South Western Slopes	NSS	8,681,126 hectares (21,451,530 acres)	NSW / VIC	
Inland Slopes	NSS01	4,640,857 hectares (11,467,810 acres)	NSW / VIC	
Lower Slopes	NSS02	3,938,809 hectares (9,733,010 acres)	NSW / VIC	
Capertee Valley	NSS03	101,460 hectares (250,700 acres)	NSW / VIC	
Nullarbor	NUL	19,722,774 hectares (48,736,040 acres)	SA / WA	
Carlisle	NUL01	5,788,547 hectares (14,303,810 acres)	SA / WA	
Nullarbor Plain	NUL02	12,785,260 hectares (31,593,100 acres)	SA / WA	
Yalata	NUL03	1,148,966 hectares (2,839,160 acres)	SA / WA	

=== O ===
IBRA regions and subregions: IBRA7
IBRA region / subregion	IBRA code	Area	States	Location in Australia
Ord Victoria Plain	OVP	12,540,703 hectares (30,988,750 acres)	NT / WA	
Purnululu	OVP01	3,233,873 hectares (7,991,070 acres)	NT / WA	
South Kimberley Interzone	OVP02	7,728,296 hectares (19,097,040 acres)	NT / WA	
Gregory	OVP03	74,982 hectares (185,280 acres)	NT / WA	
Camfield	OVP04	828,712 hectares (2,047,790 acres)	NT / WA	

=== P ===
IBRA regions and subregions: IBRA7
IBRA region / subregion	IBRA code	Area	States	Location in Australia
Pacific Subtropical Islands	PSI	5,817 hectares (14,370 acres)		
Lord Howe Island	PSI01	1,909 hectares (4,720 acres)		
Norfolk Island	PSI02	3,908 hectares (9,660 acres)		
Pine Creek	PCK	2,851,777 hectares (7,046,890 acres)	NT	
Pine Creek	PCK01	2,851,777 hectares (7,046,890 acres)	NT	
Pilbara	PIL	17,823,126 hectares (44,041,900 acres)	WA	
Chichester	PIL01	8,374,728 hectares (20,694,400 acres)	WA	
Fortescue	PIL02	1,951,435 hectares (4,822,100 acres)	WA	
Hamersley	PIL03	5,634,727 hectares (13,923,710 acres)	WA	
Roebourne	PIL04	1,862,236 hectares (4,601,690 acres)	WA	

=== R ===
IBRA regions and subregions: IBRA7
IBRA region / subregion	IBRA code	Area	States	Location in Australia
Riverina	RIV	9,704,469 hectares (23,980,270 acres)	NSW, SA, VIC	
Lachlan	RIV01	2,377,523 hectares (5,874,990 acres)	NSW, SA, VIC	
Murrumbidgee	RIV02	2,946,813 hectares (7,281,730 acres)	NSW, SA, VIC	
Murray Fans	RIV03	1,952,238 hectares (4,824,090 acres)	NSW, SA, VIC	
Victorian Riverina	RIV04	1,890,627 hectares (4,671,840 acres)	NSW, SA, VIC	
Robinvale Plains	RIV05	162,003 hectares (400,320 acres)	NSW, SA, VIC	
Murray Scroll Belt	RIV06	375,266 hectares (927,300 acres)	NSW, SA, VIC	

=== S ===
IBRA regions and subregions: IBRA7
IBRA region / subregion	IBRA code	Area	States	Location in Australia
Simpson Strzelecki Dunefields	SSD	27,984,283 hectares (69,150,670 acres)	NSW, NT, QLD, SA	
Andado	SSD01	1,355,195 hectares (3,348,760 acres)	NSW, NT, QLD, SA	
Simpson Desert	SSD02	12,962,073 hectares (32,029,980 acres)	NSW, NT, QLD, SA	
Dieri	SSD03	5,152,029 hectares (12,730,940 acres)	NSW, NT, QLD, SA	
Warriner	SSD04	1,032,165 hectares (2,550,540 acres)	NSW, NT, QLD, SA	
Strzelecki Desert	SSD05	7,482,821 hectares (18,490,450 acres)	NSW, NT, QLD, SA	
South East Coastal Plain	SCP	1,749,237 hectares (4,322,460 acres)	VIC	
Gippsland Plain	SCP01	1,246,995 hectares (3,081,390 acres)	VIC	
Otway Plain	SCP02	237,799 hectares (587,610 acres)	VIC	
Warrnambool Plain	SCP03	264,443 hectares (653,450 acres)	VIC	
South East Corner	SEC	2,532,053 hectares (6,256,840 acres)	NSW / VIC	
East Gippsland Lowlands	SEC01	623,515 hectares (1,540,740 acres)	NSW / VIC	
South East Coastal Ranges	SEC02	1,734,517 hectares (4,286,080 acres)	NSW / VIC	
Bateman	SEC03	174,020 hectares (430,000 acres)	NSW / VIC	
South Eastern Highlands	SEH	8,375,961 hectares (20,697,450 acres)	ACT, NSW, VIC	
Highlands-Southern Fall	SEH01	1,196,334 hectares (2,956,210 acres)	ACT, NSW, VIC	
Highlands-Northern Fall	SEH02	1,415,806 hectares (3,498,530 acres)	ACT, NSW, VIC	
Otway Ranges	SEH03	149,857 hectares (370,300 acres)	ACT, NSW, VIC	
Strzelecki Ranges	SEH04	342,045 hectares (845,210 acres)	ACT, NSW, VIC	
Murrumbateman	SEH06	630,454 hectares (1,557,890 acres)	ACT, NSW, VIC	
Bungonia	SEH07	431,185 hectares (1,065,480 acres)	ACT, NSW, VIC	
Kanangra	SEH08	131,310 hectares (324,500 acres)	ACT, NSW, VIC	
Crookwell	SEH09	466,523 hectares (1,152,800 acres)	ACT, NSW, VIC	
Oberon	SEH10	293,164 hectares (724,420 acres)	ACT, NSW, VIC	
Bathurst	SEH11	161,486 hectares (399,040 acres)	ACT, NSW, VIC	
Orange	SEH12	284,172 hectares (702,200 acres)	ACT, NSW, VIC	
Hill End	SEH13	504,377 hectares (1,246,340 acres)	ACT, NSW, VIC	
Bondo	SEH14	541,990 hectares (1,339,300 acres)	ACT, NSW, VIC	
Kybeyan-Gourock	SEH15	479,221 hectares (1,184,180 acres)	ACT, NSW, VIC	
Monaro	SEH16	1,267,543 hectares (3,132,170 acres)	ACT, NSW, VIC	
Capertee Uplands	SEH17	80,494 hectares (198,910 acres)	ACT, NSW, VIC	
South Eastern Queensland	SEQ	7,804,921 hectares (19,286,380 acres)	NSW / QLD	
Burnett-Curtis Hills and Ranges	SEQ01	962,583 hectares (2,378,590 acres)	NSW / QLD	
Moreton Basin	SEQ02	784,969 hectares (1,939,700 acres)	NSW / QLD	
Burringbar-Conondale Ranges	SEQ03	630,616 hectares (1,558,290 acres)	NSW / QLD	
Sunshine Coast-Gold Coast Lowlands	SEQ04	351,123 hectares (867,640 acres)	NSW / QLD	
Brisbane-Barambah Volcanics	SEQ05	806,778 hectares (1,993,590 acres)	NSW / QLD	
South Burnett	SEQ06	563,866 hectares (1,393,340 acres)	NSW / QLD	
Gympie Block	SEQ07	859,020 hectares (2,122,700 acres)	NSW / QLD	
Burnett-Curtis Coastal Lowlands	SEQ08	700,181 hectares (1,730,180 acres)	NSW / QLD	
Great Sandy	SEQ09	356,502 hectares (880,940 acres)	NSW / QLD	
Scenic Rim	SEQ10	614,729 hectares (1,519,030 acres)	NSW / QLD	
Woodenbong	SEQ11	325,603 hectares (804,580 acres)	NSW / QLD	
Clarence Sandstones	SEQ12	327,829 hectares (810,080 acres)	NSW / QLD	
Clarence Lowlands	SEQ13	520,901 hectares (1,287,170 acres)	NSW / QLD	
Southern Volcanic Plain	SVP	2,440,340 hectares (6,030,200 acres)	SA / VIC	
Victorian Volcanic Plain	SVP01	2,356,147 hectares (5,822,170 acres)	SA / VIC	
Mount Gambier	SVP02	84,194 hectares (208,050 acres)	SA / VIC	
Stony Plains	STP	13,166,372 hectares (32,534,810 acres)	SA	
Breakaways	STP01	2,444,385 hectares (6,040,210 acres)	SA	
Oodnadatta	STP02	2,593,717 hectares (6,409,210 acres)	SA	
Murnpeowie	STP03	2,910,385 hectares (7,191,720 acres)	SA	
Peake-Dennison Inlier	STP04	158,623 hectares (391,970 acres)	SA	
Macumba	STP05	693,282 hectares (1,713,140 acres)	SA	
Witjira	STP06	1,677,111 hectares (4,144,230 acres)	SA	
Baltana	STP07	2,688,870 hectares (6,644,300 acres)	SA	
Sturt Plateau	STU	9,857,531 hectares (24,358,490 acres)	NT	
Renehan	STU01	1,938,959 hectares (4,791,270 acres)	NT	
Newcastle	STU02	4,333,836 hectares (10,709,140 acres)	NT	
Birdum	STU03	3,584,736 hectares (8,858,080 acres)	NT	
Subantarctic Islands	SAI	49,164 hectares (121,490 acres)	NSW / VIC	
Heard and McDonald Islands	SAI01	36,764 hectares (90,850 acres)	NSW / VIC	
Macquarie Island	SAI02	12,400 hectares (31,000 acres)	NSW / VIC	
Swan Coastal Plain	SWA	1,525,798 hectares (3,770,330 acres)	WA	
Dandarragan Plateau	SWA01	383,465 hectares (947,560 acres)	WA	
Perth	SWA02	1,142,334 hectares (2,822,770 acres)	WA	
Sydney Basin	SYB	3,629,597 hectares (8,968,930 acres)	NSW	
Kerrabee	SYB01	437,384 hectares (1,080,800 acres)	NSW	
Hunter	SYB02	461,515 hectares (1,140,430 acres)	NSW	
Wollemi	SYB04	687,622 hectares (1,699,150 acres)	NSW	
Yengo	SYB05	461,327 hectares (1,139,960 acres)	NSW	
Wyong	SYB06	211,494 hectares (522,610 acres)	NSW	
Pittwater	SYB07	148,389 hectares (366,680 acres)	NSW	
Cumberland	SYB08	275,693 hectares (681,250 acres)	NSW	
Burragorang	SYB09	257,572 hectares (636,470 acres)	NSW	
Sydney Cataract	SYB10	153,839 hectares (380,140 acres)	NSW	
Moss Vale	SYB11	96,903 hectares (239,450 acres)	NSW	
Illawarra	SYB12	122,752 hectares (303,330 acres)	NSW	
Ettrema	SYB13	179,126 hectares (442,630 acres)	NSW	
Jervis	SYB14	135,981 hectares (336,020 acres)	NSW	

=== T ===
IBRA regions and subregions: IBRA7
IBRA region / subregion	IBRA code	Area	States	Location in Australia
Tanami	TAN	25,997,277 hectares (64,240,670 acres)	NT / WA	
Tanami Desert	TAN01	20,769,151 hectares (51,321,690 acres)	NT / WA	
Wycliffe	TAN02	1,600,893 hectares (3,955,890 acres)	NT / WA	
Sandover	TAN03	3,627,233 hectares (8,963,090 acres)	NT / WA	
Tasmanian Central Highlands	TCH	767,849 hectares (1,897,400 acres)	TAS	
Central Highlands	TCH01	767,849 hectares (1,897,400 acres)	TAS	
Tasmanian Northern Midlands	TNM	415,445 hectares (1,026,590 acres)	TAS	
Northern Midlands	TNM01	415,445 hectares (1,026,590 acres)	TAS	
Tasmanian Northern Slopes	TNS	623,103 hectares (1,539,720 acres)	TAS	
Northern Slopes	TNS01	623,103 hectares (1,539,720 acres)	TAS	
Tasmanian South East	TSE	1,131,822 hectares (2,796,790 acres)	TAS	
South East	TSE01	1,131,822 hectares (2,796,790 acres)	TAS	
Tasmanian Southern Ranges	TSR	757,228 hectares (1,871,150 acres)	TAS	
Southern Ranges	TSR01	757,228 hectares (1,871,150 acres)	TAS	
Tasmanian West	TWE	1,565,077 hectares (3,867,390 acres)	TAS	
West	TWE01	1,565,077 hectares (3,867,390 acres)	TAS	
Tiwi Cobourg	TIW	1,010,580 hectares (2,497,200 acres)	NT	
Tiwi	TIW01	748,927 hectares (1,850,640 acres)	NT	
Coburg	TIW02	261,652 hectares (646,560 acres)	NT	

=== V ===
IBRA regions and subregions: IBRA7
IBRA region / subregion	IBRA code	Area	States	Location in Australia
Victoria Bonaparte	VIB	7,301,242 hectares (18,041,760 acres)	NT / WA	
Keep	VIB01	6,441,592 hectares (15,917,520 acres)	NT / WA	
Hermit Creek	VIB02	170,646 hectares (421,680 acres)	NT / WA	
Angalarri	VIB03	689,004 hectares (1,702,570 acres)	NT / WA	
Victorian Midlands	VIM	3,469,789 hectares (8,574,040 acres)	VIC	
Goldfields	VIM01	1,326,133 hectares (3,276,950 acres)	VIC	
Central Victorian Uplands	VIM02	1,217,922 hectares (3,009,550 acres)	VIC	
Greater Grampians	VIM03	237,416 hectares (586,670 acres)	VIC	
Dundas Tablelands	VIM04	688,318 hectares (1,700,870 acres)	VIC	

=== W ===
IBRA regions and subregions: IBRA7
IBRA region / subregion	IBRA code	Area	States	Location in Australia
Warren	WAR	844,771 hectares (2,087,470 acres)	WA	
Warren	WAR01	844,771 hectares (2,087,470 acres)	WA	
Wet Tropics	WET	1,989,107 hectares (4,915,190 acres)	QLD	
Herbert	WET01	220,920 hectares (545,900 acres)	QLD	
Tully	WET02	162,958 hectares (402,680 acres)	QLD	
Innisfail	WET03	195,200 hectares (482,000 acres)	QLD	
Atherton	WET04	177,037 hectares (437,470 acres)	QLD	
Paluma-Seaview	WET05	233,751 hectares (577,610 acres)	QLD	
Kirrama-Hinchinbrook	WET06	257,594 hectares (636,530 acres)	QLD	
Bellenden Ker-Lamb	WET07	271,062 hectares (669,810 acres)	QLD	
Macalister	WET08	112,652 hectares (278,370 acres)	QLD	
Daintree-Bloomfield	WET09	357,932 hectares (884,470 acres)	QLD	

=== Y ===
IBRA regions and subregions: IBRA7
IBRA region / subregion	IBRA code	Area	States	Location in Australia
Yalgoo	YAL	5,087,577 hectares (12,571,680 acres)	WA	
Edel	YAL01	1,588,634 hectares (3,925,600 acres)	WA	
Tallering	YAL02	3,498,943 hectares (8,646,080 acres)	WA	

== See also ==
- Ecoregions in Australia
- Integrated Marine and Coastal Regionalisation of Australia (IMCRA)
