= New South Wales Regional Organisations of Councils =

Associations in Australia

New South Wales has 17 Regional Organisations of Councils (ROCs) which are voluntary groupings of councils in Australia. ROCs usually involve collaborative partnerships between neighbouring councils in a particular region or area.

Local Government NSW is an umbrella group for councils to organise and collaborate.

== Sydney metropolitan ROCs ==
With the demise of the Inner Metropolitan Regional Organisation of Councils as an active ROC, there are five ROCs in the metropolitan area:

- Northern Sydney Regional Organisation of Councils (NSROC)
- Southern Sydney Regional Organisation of Councils (SSROC)
- Western Sydney Regional Organisation of Councils (WSROC)
- Sydney Coastal Councils Group Inc (SCCG - a special purpose ROC focusing upon sustainable management of the coastal environment)

With the exception of some councils which are on the border of two ROCs and have decided to become joint members of both, the above represent distinct regional groupings. In addition, a number of coastal councils also belong to the Sydney Coastal Councils Group Inc which functions as a ROC in addressing environmental and natural resource management issues relating to the Sydney coastline.

Some metropolitan ROCs, in particular SHOROC, WSROC, NSROC and SSROC are particularly active in areas such as regional advocacy and joint activities involving their member councils such as regional tendering agreements. A more detailed description of the functions of ROCs can be found in the article Regional Organisations of Councils.

== ROCs outside the metropolitan area ==
There are a number of active ROCs outside the metropolitan area, most notably in the Hunter and Illawarra. Non-metropolitan ROCs include:

- Central Coast Regional Organisation of Councils (CCROC)
- Central NSW Councils (CENTROC)
- Hunter Councils Inc
- Mid North Coast Group of Councils
- Namoi Regional Organisation of Councils (NamoiROC)
- New England Local Government Group
- Northern Rivers Regional Organisation of Councils (NOROC)
- Orana Regional Organisation of Councils (OROC)
- Riverina Eastern Regional Organisation of Councils (REROC)
- Riverina and Murray Regional Organisation of Councils (RAMROC)
- South East Regional Organisation of Councils (SEROC)
- Southern Councils Group

== See also ==
- Regional Organisations of Councils
- Regions of New South Wales
- Local government areas of New South Wales
- Western Sydney Regional Organisation of Councils
