= Nandewar =

- Region
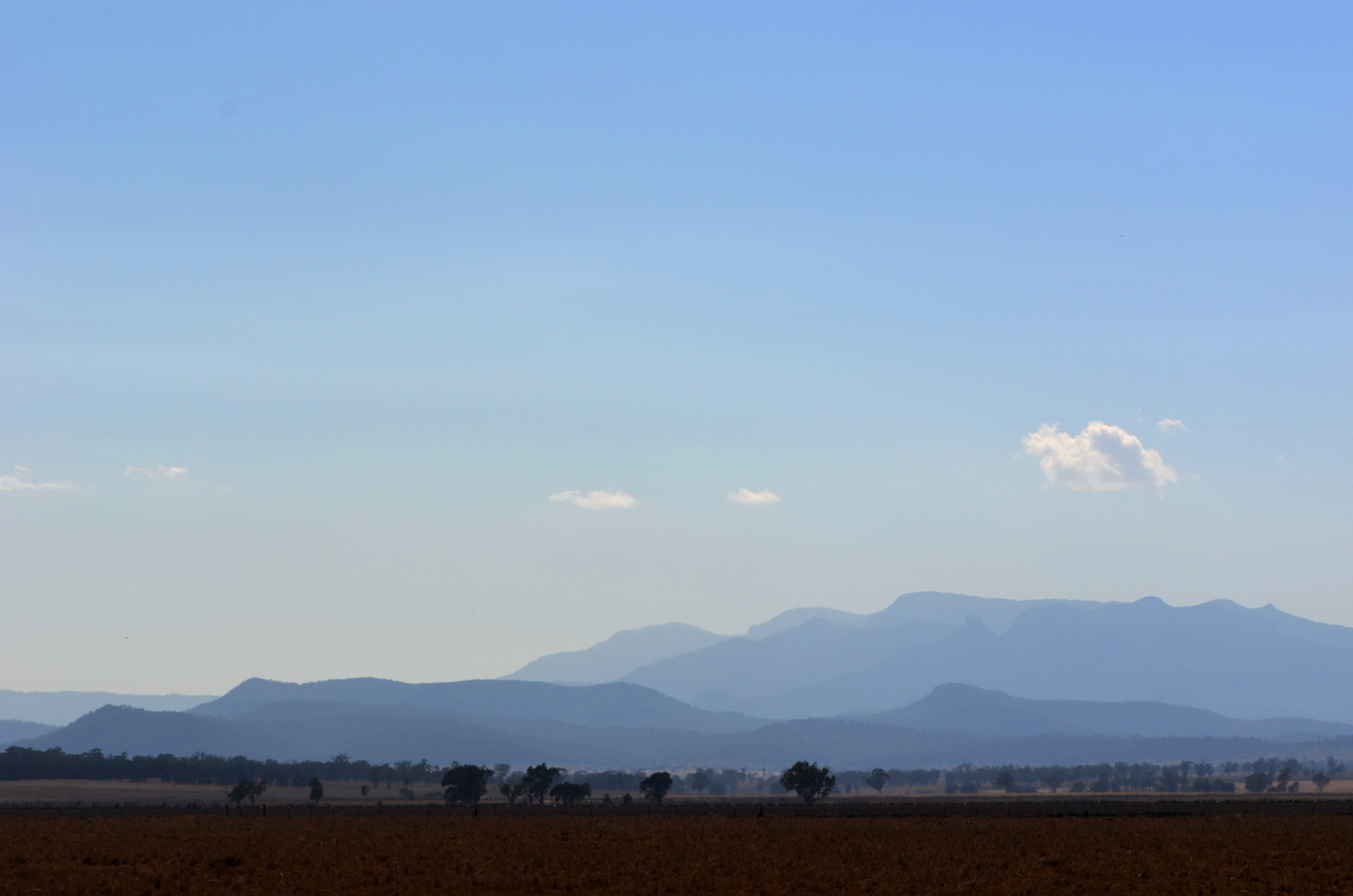
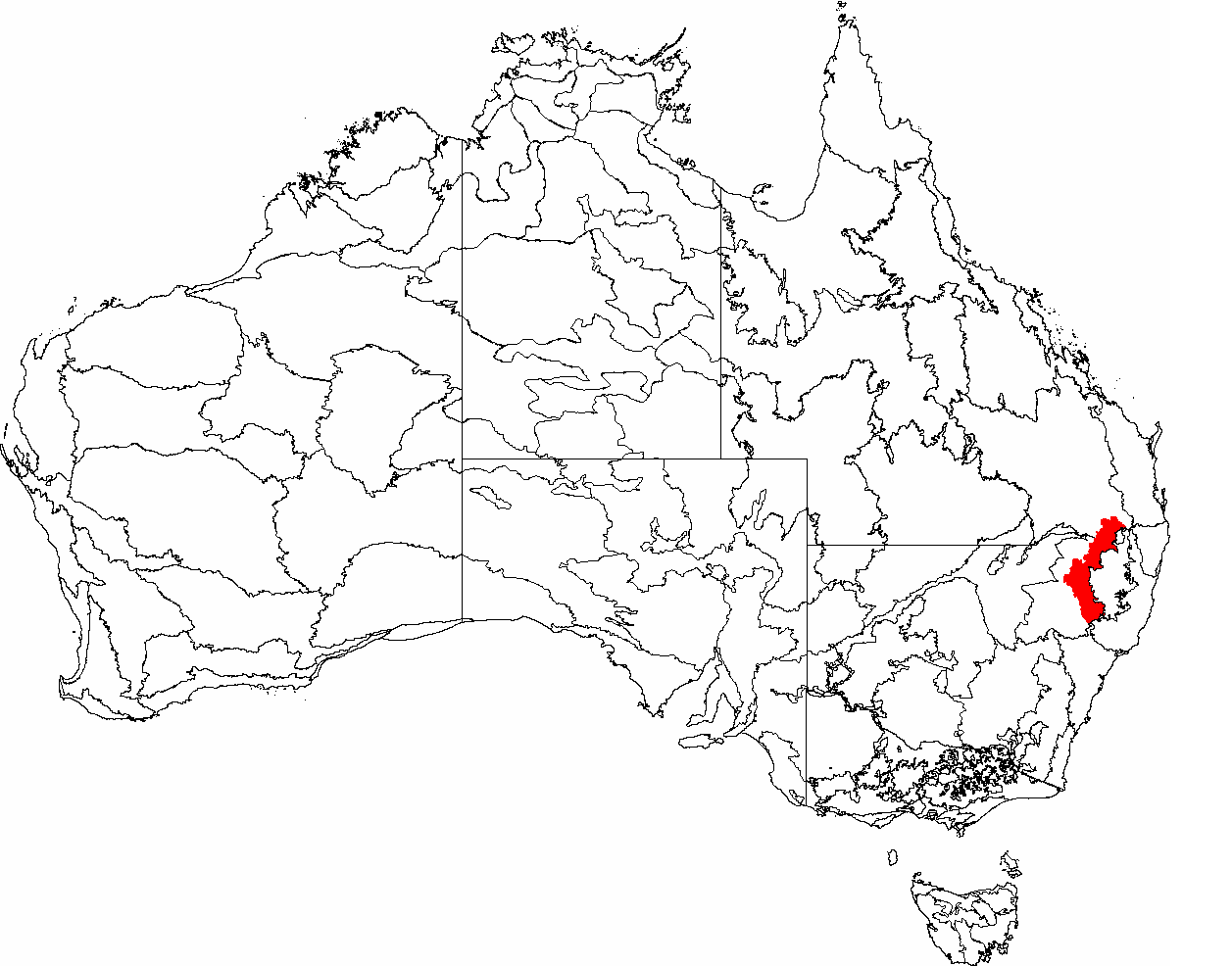
- Nandewar ranges (looking east from the Brigalow Belt South) The interim Australian bioregions, with Nandewar in red
- Country: Australia
- State: Australia

Area
  - Total: 27,019.77 km^{2} (10,432.39 sq mi)
Regions around Nandewar
Brigalow Belt South	Brigalow Belt South	New England Tablelands
Brigalow Belt South	Nandewar	New England Tablelands
Brigalow Belt South	Sydney Basin	NSW North Coast

Nandewar (code NAN), an interim Australian bioregion, is located in New South Wales and Queensland, and comprises an area of 2,701,977 hectares (6,676,730 acres), surrounded by the Brigalow Belt South to the west, south-west and north-west, and to the east by the New England Tablelands. This is a region of hills on Palaeozoic sediments and lithosols and of Eucalyptus albens woodlands and summer rainfall.

== Regions ==
In the IBRA system Nandewar has the code of NAN, and it has four sub-regions:

IBRA regions and subregions: IBRA7
IBRA subregion	IBRA code	Area	
IBRA subregion	IBRA code	ha	acres
Nandewar Northern Complex	NAN01	962,254	2,377,780
Inverell Basalts	NAN02	230,854	570,450
Kaputar	NAN03	78,307	193,500
Peel	NAN04	1,430,562	3,535,000

== See also ==
- Geography of Australia
