= Western Sydney Regional Organisation of Councils =

Australian local government group

{{multiple issues~

}} Western Sydney Regional Organisation of Councils is one of the oldest Regional Organisations of Councils or ROCs in NSW, Australia. It was formed in November 1973 to represent the councils of Western Sydney and to advocate for the people of the region.

The organisation's current membership includes 5 Greater Western Sydney councils.

== WSROC Member Councils ==
The following councils make up WSROC:

- Blacktown City Council
- Blue Mountains City Council
- Cumberland Council
- Hawkesbury City Council
- Liverpool City Council (Liverpool City Council has elected to withdraw its membership of WSROC in 2026.)

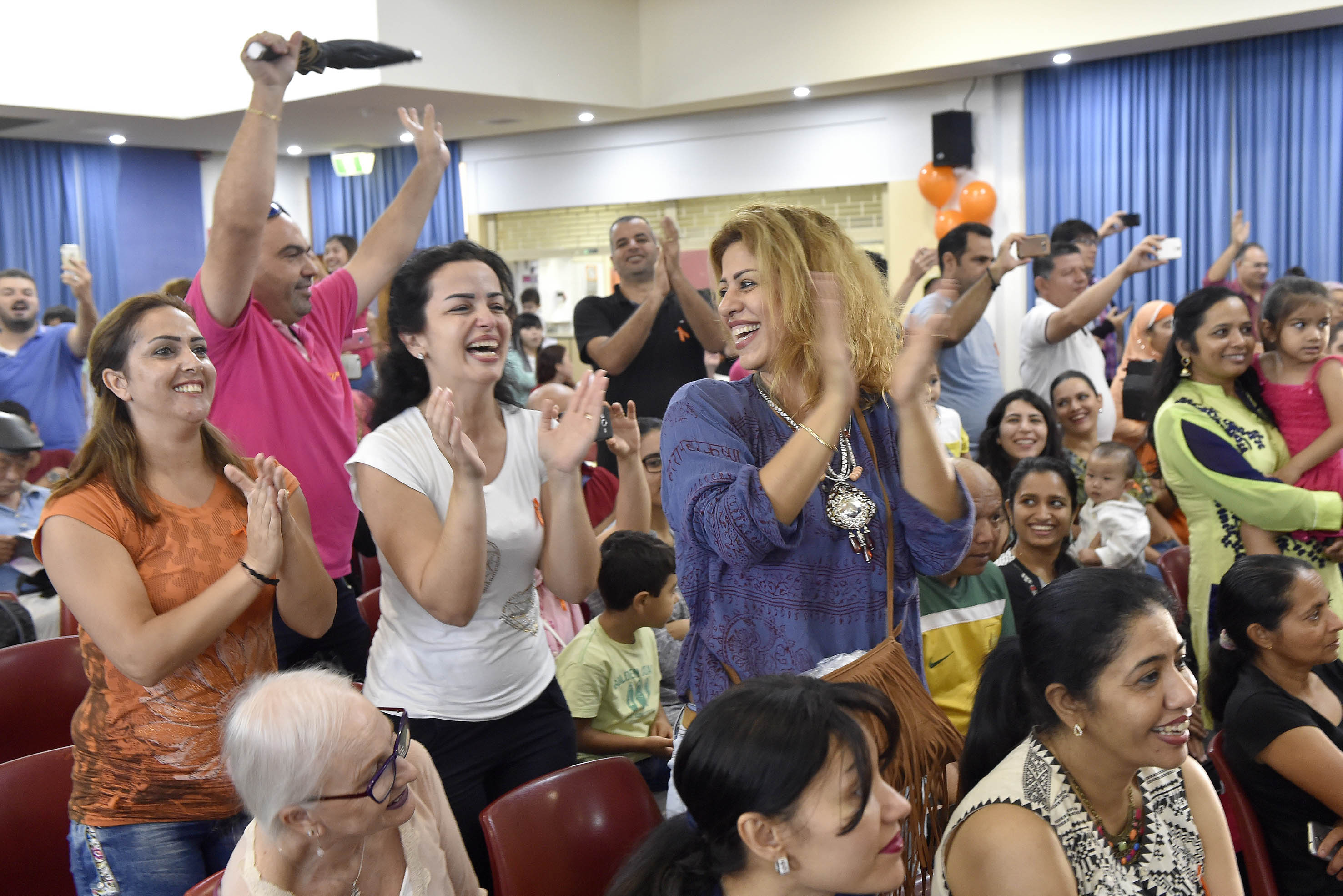
People enjoying a 'Harmony Day' community event in Western Sydney

Greater Western Sydney is a vast and culturally diverse region spanning some 8,982 square kilometres and had an estimated resident population as of 2024 of 2,799,641.

As Australia’s third-largest economy, Western Sydney contributes an estimated $170 billion in Gross Regional Product, with an average annual 2.5% growth rate.

== History ==
The Whitlam federal Labor government elected in 1972 had a strong interest in regions and formed the Department of Urban and Regional Development. In 1973 the department introduced a program to promote regional co-operation between councils.

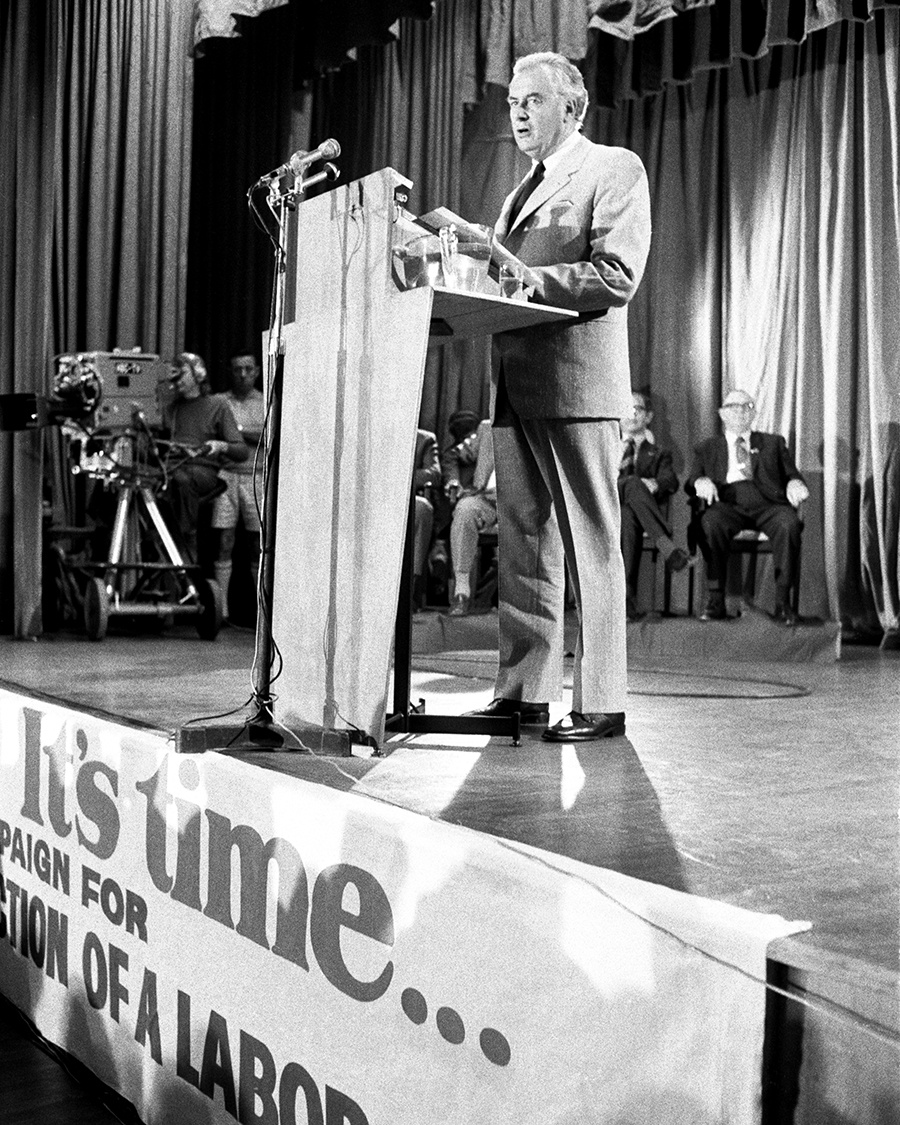
Prime Minister Gough Whitlam gives a policy speech at the Blacktown Civic Centre in 1972

At the time of its formation in 1973, councils in Western Sydney had already been meeting in a number of informal groupings to discuss their concerns. These largely centred on the failure of state governments in the postwar era to provide infrastructure and services such as hospitals, public transport and tertiary education to match the region's rapidly growing population.

These concerns coincided with the Whitlam government's interest in regional co-operation and provided the basis for WSROC's ongoing support by its member councils even after the demise of the Labor government.

WSROC employed its first staff member in 1977 and became a company limited in 1991. Although most of the other Whitlam-era ROCs eventually folded, WSROC itself became a model for the formation in the 1980s and 1990s of a number of other ROCs. WSROC remains distinct from most other ROCs, however, because of its continued strong emphasis on research and advocacy.

== Recent achievements ==
On 8 November 2023, ABC News reported that WSROC has called on the NSW Government to move the deadline for food and organic waste (FOGO) collections to 2035. The NSW Government's waste and sustainable materials strategy currently requires the separation of household food and garden organic waste by 2030.

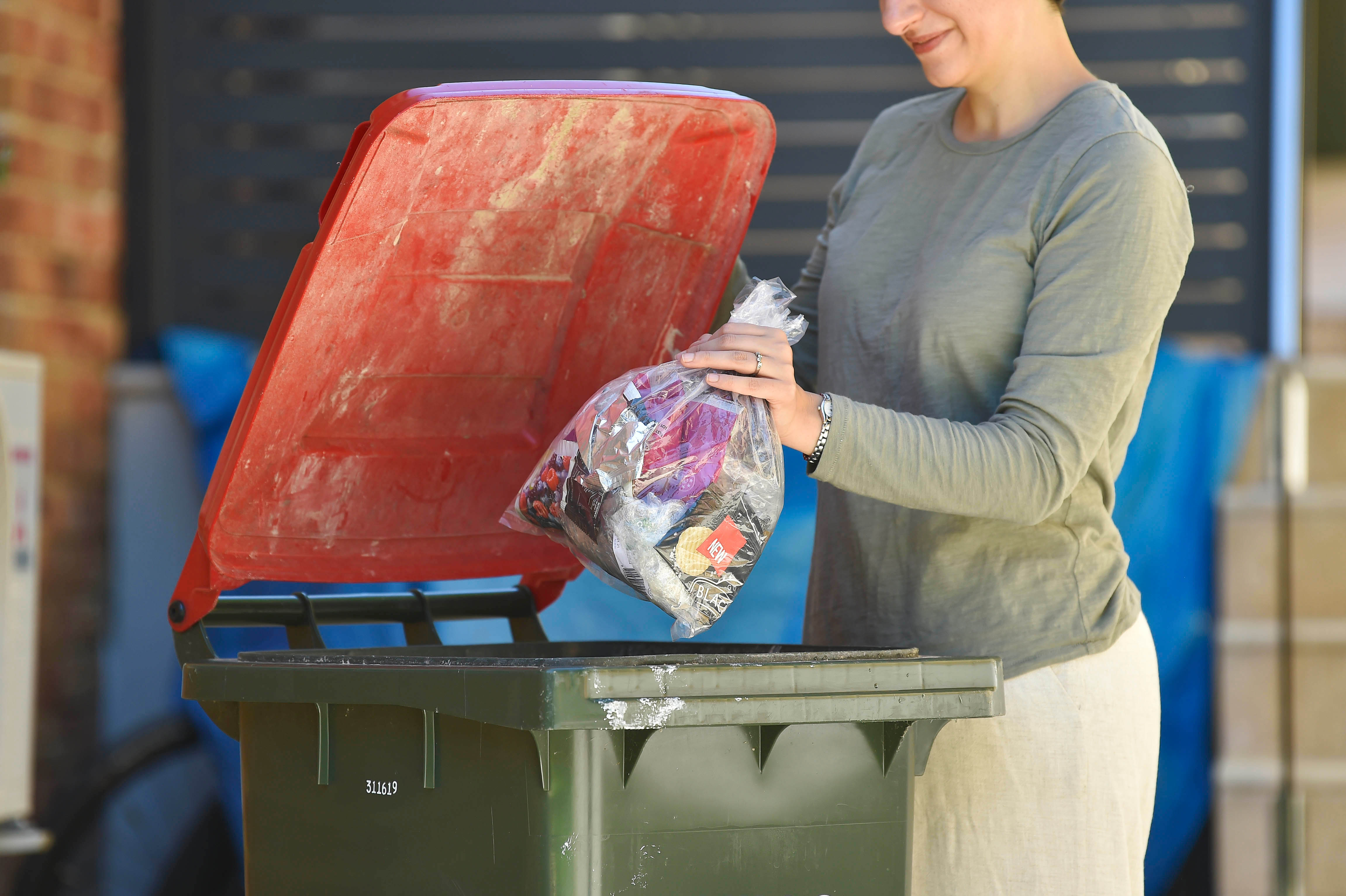
WSROC undertakes litter research, manages litter prevention projects and collaborates on recycling at a regional level.

In August 2022, the NSW Minister for Infrastructure, Minister for Cities, and Minister for Active Transport, Rob Stokes MP, joined The Walking Volunteers to officially launch a new 80-kilometre stretch of the Great West Walk from Katoomba to Emu Plains.

Other major initiatives by WSROC include establishing the Greater Sydney Heat Taskforce and overseeing the Heat Smart City Plan, a five-year multi-sector plan to put in place systems and mechanisms to protect Greater Sydney from the impacts of extreme heat.

WSROC also has oversight of the Cumberland Plain Conservation Plan (CPCP) Program in partnership with the NSW Department of Planning Housing and Infrastructure.

The CPCP offers compliance support to councils to reduce and prevent illegal vegetation clearance on the Sydney Cumberland Plain regions and to provide support to First Nations communities in the region.

WSROC also oversees the Western Sydney Energy Program in conjunction with Western Sydney councils to achieve energy, cost and emission savings. The program's current aspiration is to reduce Western Sydney's annual carbon emissions by 200,000 tonnes per year.

Over the last 10 years, WSROC has attracted some $20 million in project grants, enabling it to undertake major regional projects, prepare original research, undertake community engagement programs, strategic planning and professional development for council staff, achieving significant economies of scale for its members.

== Structure ==
All member councils make an equal annual contribution to the operating costs of WSROC and have equal voting rights on the organisation's board, which is its primary decision-making body.

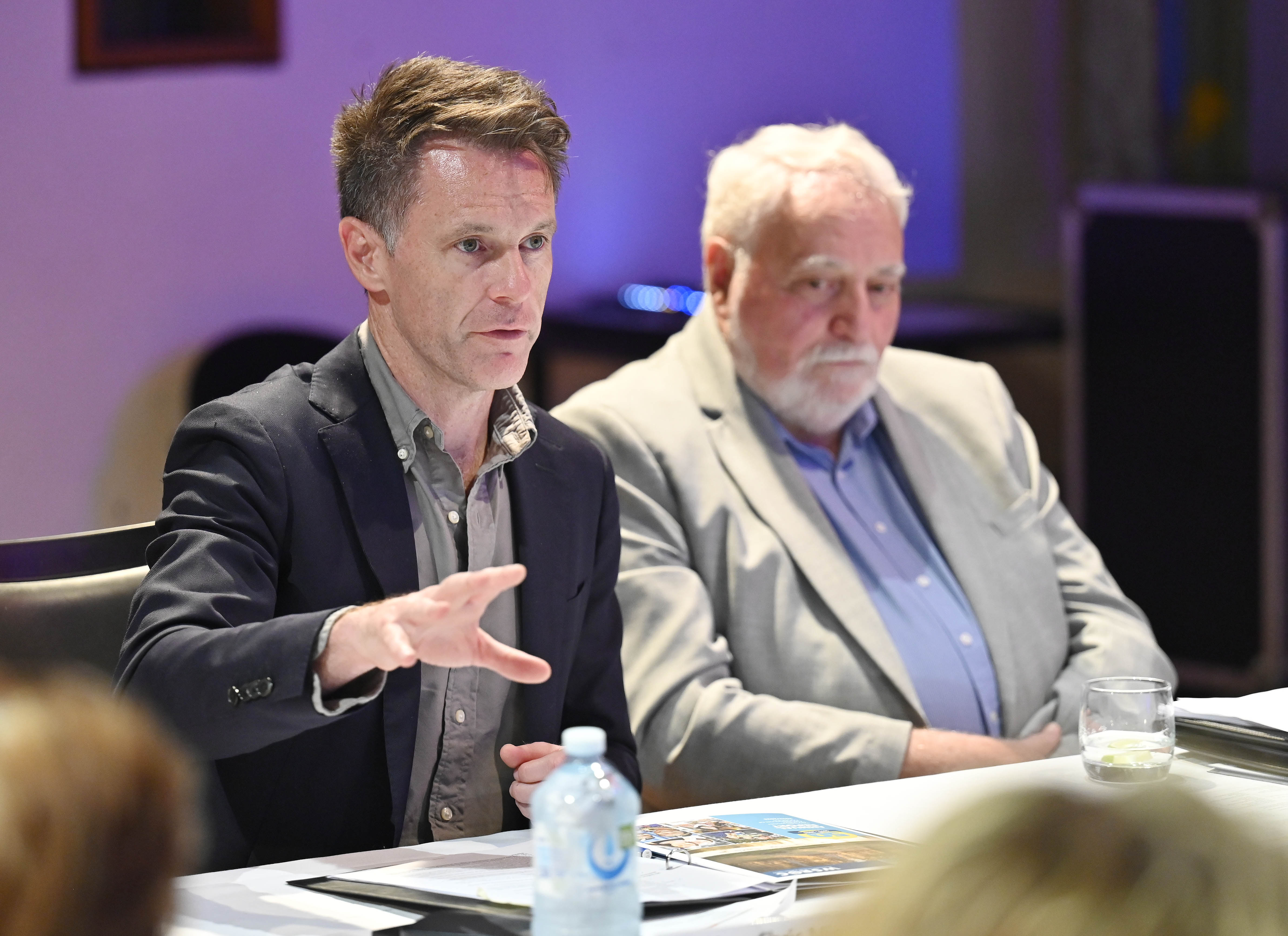
NSW Premier Chris Minns (left) attends a WSROC Board Meeting chaired by Emeritus WSROC President Councillor Barry Calvert (right).

The WSROC board comprises two voting directors from each member council who serve a four-year term concurrent with their councillor terms. The directors in turn elect the organisation's president and other executive positions. The organisation is supported by a small regional secretariat. Several professional committees made up of staff from member Councils also assist in implementing the work program.

The Board sets WSROC's strategic plan and work program through a planning forum held every four years and regularly reviewed. The work program centres on WSROC's primary role – to lobby for the councils and communities of Western Sydney – but the organisation also undertakes a number of other "typical" ROC roles such as regional project development and management, resource sharing between councils and supporting regional joint purchase initiatives.

== Alumni ==
A number of politicians who were subsequently elected to state or federal parliament had key roles on the WSROC board in the early stages of their political careers.

Current examples include Chris Bowen who is the Federal Minister for Immigration and Citizenship and who served as a WSROC president, as did Paul Lynch who is the Shadow Minister for Attorney General and Justice in the NSW state opposition and Helen Westwood, a member of the NSW Legislative Council.

In 2015, former Member for Strathfield (NSW Legislative Assembly) Charles Casuscelli RFD was appointed CEO of WSROC. He continued to occupy that role until his passing in June 2025.

The currernt CEO of WSROC is Ms Francine Binns.

== See also ==
- Regional Organisations of Councils
- Regions of New South Wales
- Local government areas of New South Wales
- Greater Western Sydney
