= Helen Westwood =

Australian politician

The Honourable Helen Westwood AM
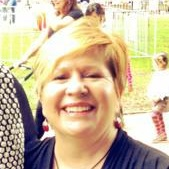

Member of Legislative Council of New South Wales
- In office 24 March 2007 – 6 March 2015

Personal details
- Party: Labor Party

Helen Mary Westwood AM is a former Australian politician and Labor Party member of the New South Wales Legislative Council. Westwood was a member of the council from 2007 to 2015.

== Personal and early life ==
Westwood was born to Harry and Cecily Wray. Her brother David is known in the music industry as crooner Frank Bennett. Westwood married Bob in 1973, and they have two daughters and four grandchildren.

She attended Catholic schools, but in her final year she attended Birrong Girls High School along with fellow politician Lynda Voltz.

She began her working life at 15 years of age and she has had a variety of jobs including shop assistant, accounting machinist, clerical assistant, stay-at-home mum, community worker and electorate officer.

Westwood was previously married and is currently in a same-sex relationship.

== Political career ==
Helen Westwood joined the Bargo-Picton Branch of the Australian Labor Party in 1976 (and which is now subsumed into the Wollondilly Branch). She became the Secretary of the Sefton Branch in 1977 and has remained an active member ever since.

She was a Councillor of Bankstown City Council between 1995 and 2007. She was its Deputy Mayor between 1997 and 1998, and between September 2002 to May 2006, she was the Mayor of Bankstown. She claims to be the first mayor of Bankstown to be elected to the New South Wales Parliament. She was a board member of the Western Sydney Regional Organisation of Councils (WSROC) since 2001 and chair from 2004 to 2005. She was also a member of the Executive of the New South Wales Local Government Association. She was a Director of the Board of Waste Recycling and Processing Corporation from 1996 to 2007.

In 2006, she resigned as Mayor to become an adviser to State Fisheries Minister Ian MacDonald as a prelude to her nomination on the Labor Party ticket for the Legislative Council.

She was elected to the New South Wales Legislative Council in 2007 as a Left faction candidate. She received the twelfth highest quota for the council.

Shortly after her election, she raised allegations about politician Paul Gibson assaulting fellow MP Sandra Nori resulting in Gibson standing down from the Ministry whilst the allegations were investigated. Gibson never returned to the Ministry and another Minister, Phil Koperberg, was briefly stood aside in a related historical domestic violence allegations. These matters caused significant damage to the Iemma Labor Government.

In 2008, she was one of a number of Australian politicians who backed besieged politician Belinda Neal.

In 2011, she was deputy chair of a parliamentary inquiry into domestic violence which pushed for an integrated response to domestic and family violence by the NSW Government.

In 2014, Helen Westwood participated in a move by the Labor-affiliated Australian Services Union to allow the membership to vote on who the Union's delegates would preselect for the Labor ticket in the Legislative Council. Despite winning the endorsement of the ASU rank and file Helen ultimately failed in her bid to regain preselection on the back of other Left-affiliated unions (the AMWU, CFMEU and CPSU) voting for Luke Foley, Lynda Voltz and Mick Veitch. Allegations were raised that this was the final payback for the earlier allegations against Paul Gibson.

== Awards ==
In 2001, she was awarded the Centenary Medal in 2001 for service to Local Government.

In 2006, she was made a Member of the Order of Australia (AM) for her services to Local Government.

In 2007, she was commended in the Women of the West Award for her commitment and dedication to improving social balance, equity, opportunity and community harmony.

Civic offices
| Preceded by David Blake | Mayor of Bankstown; 2002 – 2006 | Succeeded by Tania Mihailuk |
