= Binghi Plateau =

The Binghi Plateau is a sub-region of the New England Tablelands bioregion of northern New South Wales, Australia. It is within Glen Innes Severn and Tenterfield Shires. Mainly composed of open eucalypt forest, it is rich in native animals and plants.
