= Bogie River Hills =

Subregion of the Brigalow Belt North in Queensland, Australia

Coordinates: 20°18′28″S 147°58′05″E

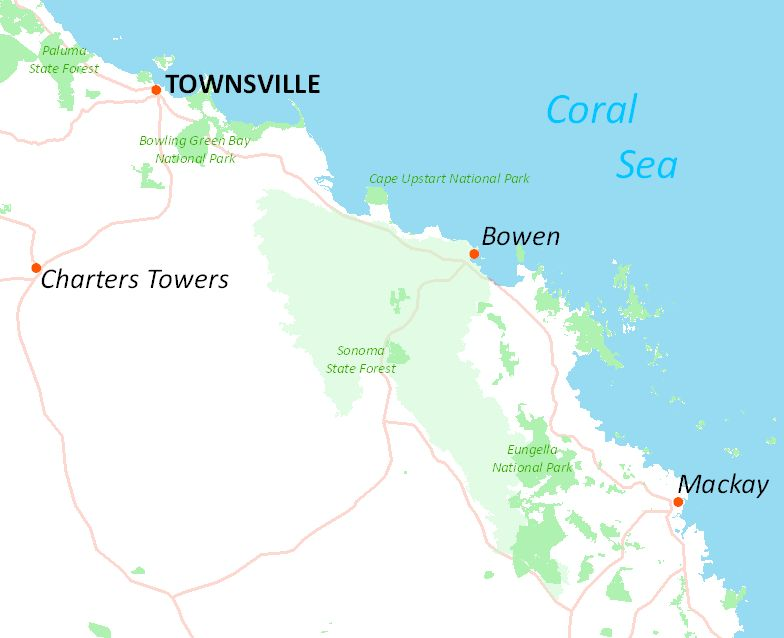
Extent of the Bogie River Hills

The Bogie River Hills is a subregion of the Brigalow Belt North in Queensland, Australia.

The Bogie river Hills subregion has a total area of approximately 9000 sq. kilometres and is oriented along a north-west - south-east axis. It is bounded by the eastern margin of the Bowen Basin (Millaroo fault zone) in the west, the ranges that descend to the Proserpine coastal lowlands in the east, Burdekin River delta and the coastal plains in the north, and to the south-east, it runs down towards the Eungella Dam.

A portion of the alluvial plain of the lower Burdekin River is located in the north and north west of the subregion. Smaller alluvial plains are located on the Bowen and Bogie rivers which flow through the subregion into the Burdekin River. The Don River which flows into the sea near Bowen has an alluvial plain and a small delta. To the north of the Don River is a narrow coastal plain across which several small coastal streams flow, this is analogous to but smaller than the Townsville coastal plain to the north.

To the south the Lizzie Creek Volcanics, which are largely basic volcaniclastic rocks with interbedded sedimentary rocks have produced distinct landforms, soils and vegetation communities. This area is essentially lowlands with a few isolated peaks. It consists of the lower drainage basins of the Bogie, Bowen, and Broken rivers, and several smaller streams. Elevation is between 50 and 200 metres.

The remainder of the subregion is largely mountainous, hilly and undulating land on acid to intermediate igneous rocks. This area contains a number of prominent mountains including Mount Abbot, Edinburgh Castle, Mount Aberdeen, Highlanders Bonnet. Elevation ranges from about 200 metres to over 100 metres.

The Bogie River Hills has a mean annual rainfall of 700 mm, but actual rainfall tends to be higher in the east where the main mountain ranges occur, and lower towards the south-west. There is a marked rain shadow on the western side of the Clarke, Normanby, and Broken River ranges, which has resulted in one of the steepest rainfall gradients in Australia. Drainage of the subregion is largely into the Bogie River/Bowen River/Burdekin River system and then into the Townsville Plains bioregion, through the Burdekin delta, and then out to sea. Drainage is also partly toward Bowen via the Don River, and towards Proserpine via the upper Proserpine and Andromache rivers. The Peter Faust Dam and Eungella Dam are located within this subregion.

The main settlements in this subregion are Bowen, with Collinsville/Scottsdale immediately outside the central-western part of the subregion boundary. Coal mining is a major industry at Collinsville, and a dedicated railway line runs from there to a coal loading facility at Abbot Point. There Bowen Developmental Road is the sealed road between Bowen and Collinsville which then continues southward. The Bruce Highway passes through the coastal area in the north-east. Other roads are gravel, with low-level concrete stream crossings.

== See also ==
- Regions of Queensland
