= Regional Organisations of Councils =

Voluntary groupings of neighbouring councils in Australia

Regional Organisations of Councils (ROCs) – sometimes called Voluntary Regional Organisations of Councils – are voluntary groupings of councils in Australia. ROCs usually involve collaborative partnerships between neighbouring councils in a particular region or area.

ROCs vary considerably in size and structure but they have two things in common: their member councils have agreed to work together on one or more common issues and they nominate councillors (and in a small number of cases, council staff) to represent them on the ROC’s board.

Smaller ROCs operate entirely through the staff of their member councils and may not have any formal structure. Others are incorporated associations or companies and have a small staffed secretariat funded mainly through membership fees. ROCs also derive income from fees for managing joint activities for their member councils or from grants from state and federal governments.

The activities of ROCs vary from organisation to organisation and include:

- Research and advocacy on key regional issues to state and federal governments
- Management of regional tendering and purchase agreements which achieve economies of scale and/or cost savings for member councils
- Facilitation of cooperative activities between councils such as regional planning, environmental management or economic development
- Management of regional projects funded by other levels of government
- Information exchange and best practice initiatives
- Regional promotion

Some of these activities may involve only member councils but many ROCs also develop strategic partnerships with other organisations, regional or state associations or state and federal government agencies. However, ROCs usually have no formal statutory authority and their advocacy can bring them into conflict with state government.

Not all councils belong to a ROC, whilst a small number of councils on the borders between two ROCs belong to more than one organisation. The number of ROCs and proportion of participating councils varies from state to state, with NSW and Queensland having the highest number of active ROCs. There are 17 NSW Regional Organisations of Councils and 18 in Queensland.

== See also ==
- List of regions of Australia
- NSW Regional Organisations of Councils
