= Brigalow Belt =

Ecoregion in Queensland, Australia

Coordinates: 21°59′S 148°07′E

Brigalow Belt Brigalow tropical savanna
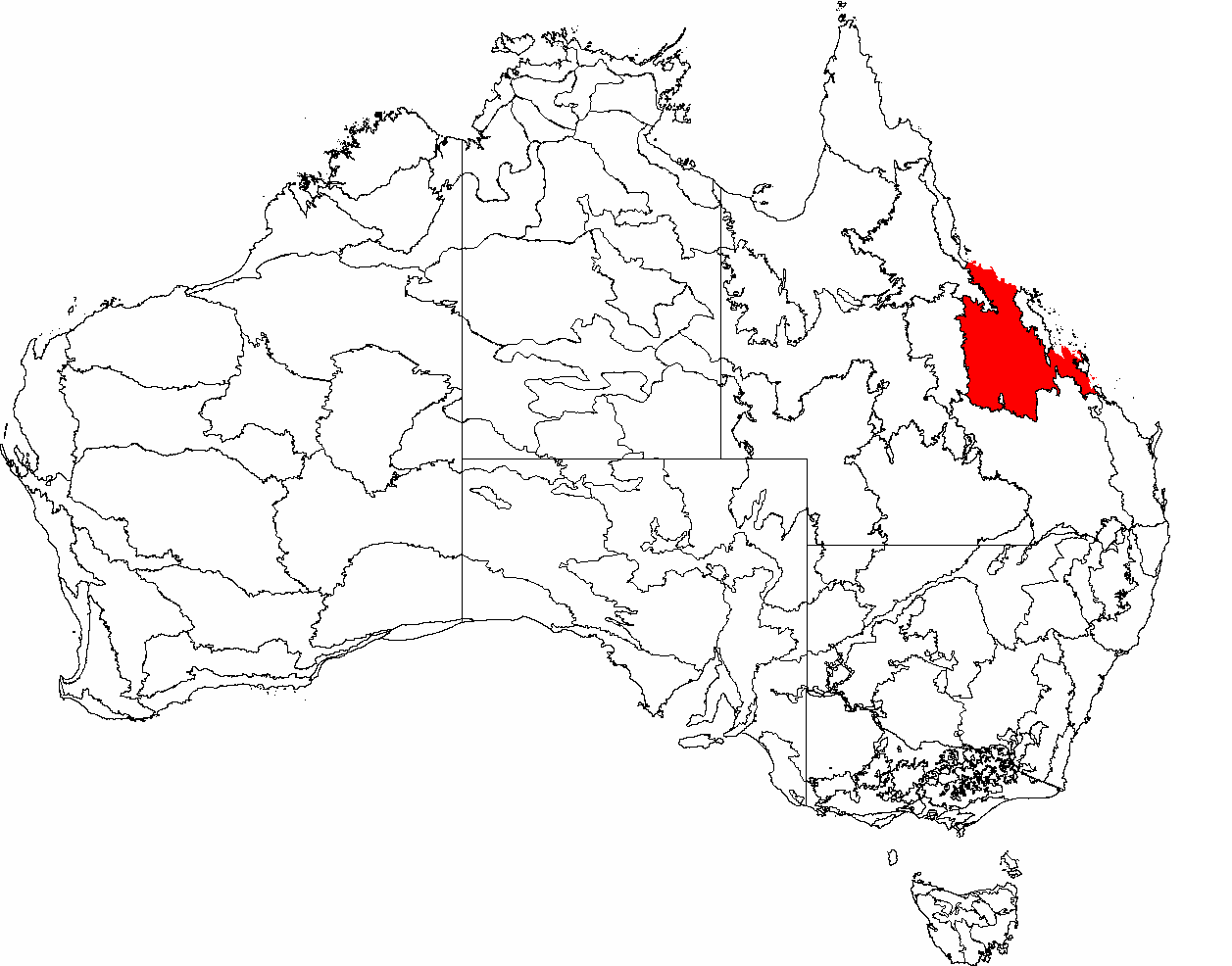
- Brigalow Belt North (BBN) (IBRA

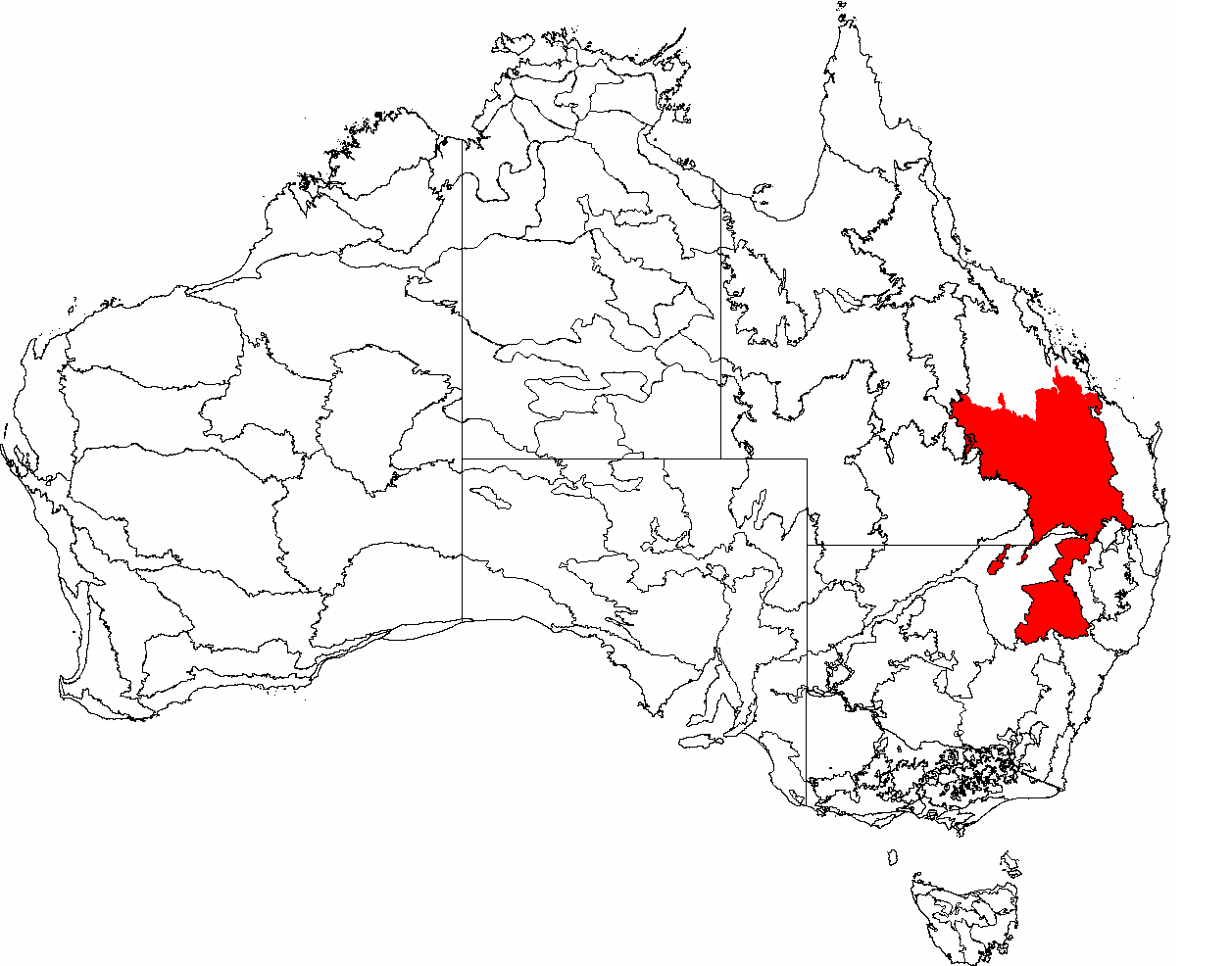
- Brigalow Belt South (BBS) (IBRA)

Ecology
- Realm: Australasian
- Biome: tropical and subtropical grasslands, savannas, and shrublands
- Borders: List: Eastern Australia mulga shrublands; Eastern Australia temperate forests; Einasleigh Uplands savanna; Mitchell Grass Downs; Queensland tropical rain forests; Southeast Australia temperate savanna

Geography
- Area: 408,242 km^{2} (157,623 mi^{2})
- Country: Australia
- States: Queensland; New South Wales

Conservation
- Conservation status: Critical/endangered
- Protected: 17,891 km² (4%)

The Brigalow Belt is a wide band of acacia-wooded grassland that runs between tropical rainforest of the coast and the semi-arid interior of Queensland and northern New South Wales, Australia. The Interim Biogeographic Regionalisation for Australia (IBRA) divides the Brigalow Belt into two IBRA regions, or bioregions, Brigalow Belt North (BBN) and Brigalow Belt South (BBS). The North and South Brigalow Belt are two of the 85 bioregions across Australia and the 15 bioregions in Queensland. Together they form most of the Brigalow tropical savanna ecoregion.

== Location and description ==
The Northern Brigalow Belt covers just over 135,000 square kilometres (52,124 sq mi) and runs from just north of Townsville to Emerald and Rockhampton on the Tropic of Capricorn, while the Southern Brigalow Belt runs from there down to the Queensland/New South Wales border and a little beyond, until the habitat becomes the eucalyptus dominated Eastern Australian temperate forests.

This large, complex strip of countryside covers an area of undulating to rugged slopes, consisting of ranges as well as plains of ancient sand and clay deposits, basalt and alluvium. The Northern Brigalow Belt includes the coal producing Bowen Basin, with the nearby Drummond Basin and the fertile Peak Downs areas. The southern belt, which begins with the sandstone gorges of the Carnarvon Range of the Great Dividing Range, runs into the huge Great Artesian Basin. The south-west side includes the farming area of Darling Downs.

A number of important rivers drain the Brigalow Belt. The large Fitzroy River system and the Belyando and Burdekin rivers near the tropics all drain eastwards, while the south-western areas drain westwards into the Murray–Darling basin via the Maranoa, Warrego and Condamine Rivers.

In the north, there are tropical summer rains and warm weather all year round, while in the south the winter is slightly cooler and there is more rainfall outside of the summer months. Throughout the belt, the interior, with less than 500 mm of rainfall per year, is drier than the coast, which may have 750 mm or more.

== Flora ==
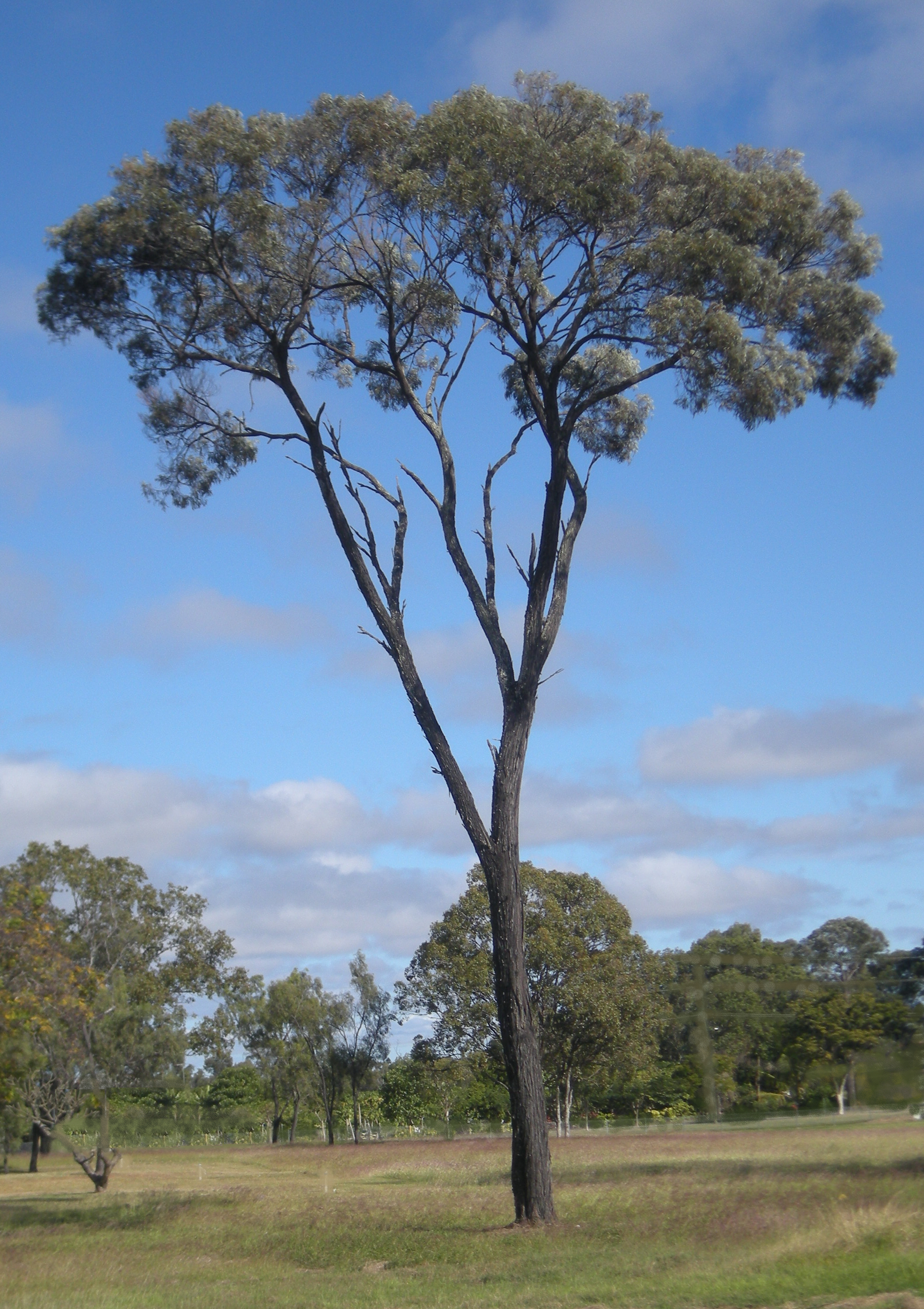
Brigalow tree, coastal central Queensland.

The characteristic plant communities are woodlands of highly water stress tolerant brigalow (Acacia harpophylla), a slender acacia tree which thrives on the clay soil and once covered much of the area especially the fertile lowlands. Most of the brigalow has been cleared to make agricultural land, but the Queensland Bottle Tree is often left uncleared due to its leaves being fodder for cattle. Eucalypt woodlands of silver-leaved and narrow-leaved ironbarks, poplar box and other boxes, blackbutt and coolibah are also intact primarily on the higher slopes. Callitris glaucophylla is common near areas with clay soils.

Dichanthium grasslands are another typical habitat of the area while pockets of thicker woodland of brigalow mixed with Casuarina cristata and ooline occur in moister valleys and vine thickets, wetlands, and softwood scrubs are sometimes found although in their undeveloped state, these specialised micro-habitats are rare today. There is a particularly rich variety of habitats in areas such as Isla Gorge and Blackdown Tableland in the sandstone belt of the Carnarvon Range. The Northern Brigalow Belt is one of fifteen national biodiversity hotspots in Australia.

== Fauna ==
The region is home to the unadorned rock-wallaby and the black-striped wallaby, which lives in the areas of vine thicket along with a wingless dung beetle (Onthophagus apterus). Two endangered mammals are found in the Brigalow Belt; the bridled nail-tail wallaby in Taunton and Idalia National Parks, and the burrowing northern hairy-nosed wombat in the grassland and eucalyptus of Epping Forest National Park. There are also populations of dunnart, wallaby, bat and koala. Birds found here include black-throated finch and russet-tailed thrush, while endemic reptiles include the Fitzroy River turtle.

A variety of spiders and insects are found there, including Euoplos dignitas, an armoured trapdoor spider discovered in 2023.

Already extinct fauna include the white-footed rabbit-rat and the Darling Downs hopping mouse.

Eastern grey kangaroo in Carnarvon Gorge National Park, Queensland (1982)

== Threats and preservation ==
Together with the Mulga Lands, the Brigalow Belt are where most of Queensland's land clearing is occurring. Much of the brigalow woodland has been cleared or radically reduced to the extent that some wildlife, failing to thrive in the altered environment, has become extinct here with a number of the remaining communities threatened or endangered. The clearance of brigalow and poplar box is ongoing as there are a number of nature reserves of which do protect the various types of habitat found in the Belt including brigalow and eucalyptus woodland, grassland, vine thicket, high peaks, sandstone gorges and wetlands however these tend to be located on the sandstone uplands rather than the fertile lowlands, where the brigalow woodlands are still vulnerable to clearance and are often limited to small areas of parkland. The grasslands of the region are also under threat from introduced pasture grasses such as buffelgrass and weeds such as Congress weed. One particular threat comes from alterations to natural flow patterns caused by the addition of dams and weirs which impact the riverine and floodplain plant and animal species.

=== Protected areas ===
A little more than two per cent of the Brigalow Belt lies within national parks and other protected areas. The largest national parks in the Brigalow Belt are: Taunton (the largest at 115 km^{2}); Epping Forest, Dipperu, Bowling Green Bay, Goodedulla National Park, Chesterton Range National Park, Homevale National Park, Blackdown Tableland National Park, Expedition National Park, and Carnarvon National Park.

== Subregions ==
IBRA subregions of the Brigalow Belt North include Townsville Plains, Bogie River Hills, Cape River Hills, Beucazon Hills, Wyarra Hills, Northern Bowen Basin, Belyando Downs, Upper Belyando Floodout, Anakie Inlier, Basalt Downs, Isaac–Comet Downs, Nebo–Connors Ranges, South Drummond Basin and Marlborough Plains.

IBRA regions and subregions: IBRA7
IBRA region / subregion	IBRA code	Area	States	Location in Australia
Brigalow Belt North	BBN	33,790,510 hectares (83,498,200 acres)	Qld	
Townsville Plains	BBN01	763,495 ha (1,886,640 acres)	Qld	
Bogie River Hills	BBN02	1,054,392 ha (2,605,460 acres)	Qld	
Cape River Hills	BBN03	747,393 ha (1,846,850 acres)	Qld	
Beucazon Hills	BBN04	95,821 ha (236,780 acres)	Qld	
Wyarra Hills	BBN05	397,935 ha (983,320 acres)	Qld	
Northern Bowen Basin	BBN06	1,316,957 ha (3,254,270 acres)	Qld	
Belyando Downs	BBN07	1,772,127 ha (4,379,020 acres)	Qld	
Upper Belyando Floodout	BBN08	466,275 ha (1,152,190 acres)	Qld	
Anakie Inlier	BBN09	382,284 ha (944,640 acres)	Qld	
Basalt Downs	BBN10	1,274,731 ha (3,149,930 acres)	Qld	
Isaac-Comet Downs	BBN11	2,693,397 ha (6,655,530 acres)	Qld	
Nebo-Connors Ranges	BBN12	449,269 ha (1,110,170 acres)	Qld	
South Drummond Basin	BBN13	1,009,244 ha (2,493,900 acres)	Qld	
Marlborough Plains	BBN14	1,250,611 ha (3,090,330 acres)	Qld	

IBRA regions and subregions: IBRA7
IBRA region / subregion	IBRA code	Area	States	Location in Australia
Brigalow Belt South	BBS	27,219,776 hectares (67,261,530 acres)	Qld / NSW	
Claude River Downs	BBS01	1,026,214 ha (2,535,830 acres)	Qld / NSW	
Woorabinda	BBS02	749,785 ha (1,852,760 acres)	Qld / NSW	
Boomer Range	BBS03	220,541 ha (544,970 acres)	Qld / NSW	
Mount Morgan Ranges	BBS04	1,275,970 ha (3,153,000 acres)	Qld / NSW	
Callide Creek Downs	BBS05	30,133 ha (74,460 acres)	Qld / NSW	
Arcadia	BBS06	715,288 ha (1,767,520 acres)	Qld / NSW	
Dawson River Downs	BBS07	982,807 ha (2,428,570 acres)	Qld / NSW	
Banana-Auburn Ranges	BBS08	1,547,555 ha (3,824,090 acres)	Qld / NSW	
Buckland Basalts	BBS09	281,306 ha (695,120 acres)	Qld / NSW	
Carnarvon Ranges	BBS10	2,263,686 ha (5,593,690 acres)	Qld / NSW	
Taroom Downs	BBS11	652,005 ha (1,611,140 acres)	Qld / NSW	
Southern Downs	BBS12	4,264,666 ha (10,538,220 acres)	Qld / NSW	
Barakula	BBS13	1,301,712 ha (3,216,600 acres)	Qld / NSW	
Dulacca Downs	BBS14	162,442 ha (401,400 acres)	Qld / NSW	
Weribone High	BBS15	966,510 ha (2,388,300 acres)	Qld / NSW	
Tara Downs	BBS16	511,339 ha (1,263,550 acres)	Qld / NSW	
Eastern Darling Downs	BBS17	1,697,945 ha (4,195,710 acres)	Qld / NSW	
Inglewood Sandstones	BBS18	1,219,008 ha (3,012,230 acres)	Qld / NSW	
Moonie-Commoron Floodout	BBS19	750,661 ha (1,854,920 acres)	Qld / NSW	
Moonie-Barwon Interfluve	BBS20	765,231 ha (1,890,930 acres)	Qld / NSW	
Northern Basalts	BBS21	624,671 ha (1,543,600 acres)	Qld / NSW	
Northern Outwash	BBS22	700,241 ha (1,730,330 acres)	Qld / NSW	
Pilliga Outwash	BBS23	535,392 ha (1,322,980 acres)	Qld / NSW	
Pilliga	BBS24	1,732,137 ha (4,280,200 acres)	Qld / NSW	
Liverpool Plains	BBS25	941,752 ha (2,327,120 acres)	Qld / NSW	
Liverpool Range	BBS26	521,960 ha (1,289,800 acres)	Qld / NSW	
Talbragar Valley	BBS27	203,894 ha (503,830 acres)	Qld / NSW	
Narrandool	BBS28	303,754 ha (750,590 acres)	Qld / NSW	
