= New England Tablelands bioregion =

New England Tablelands
- Region
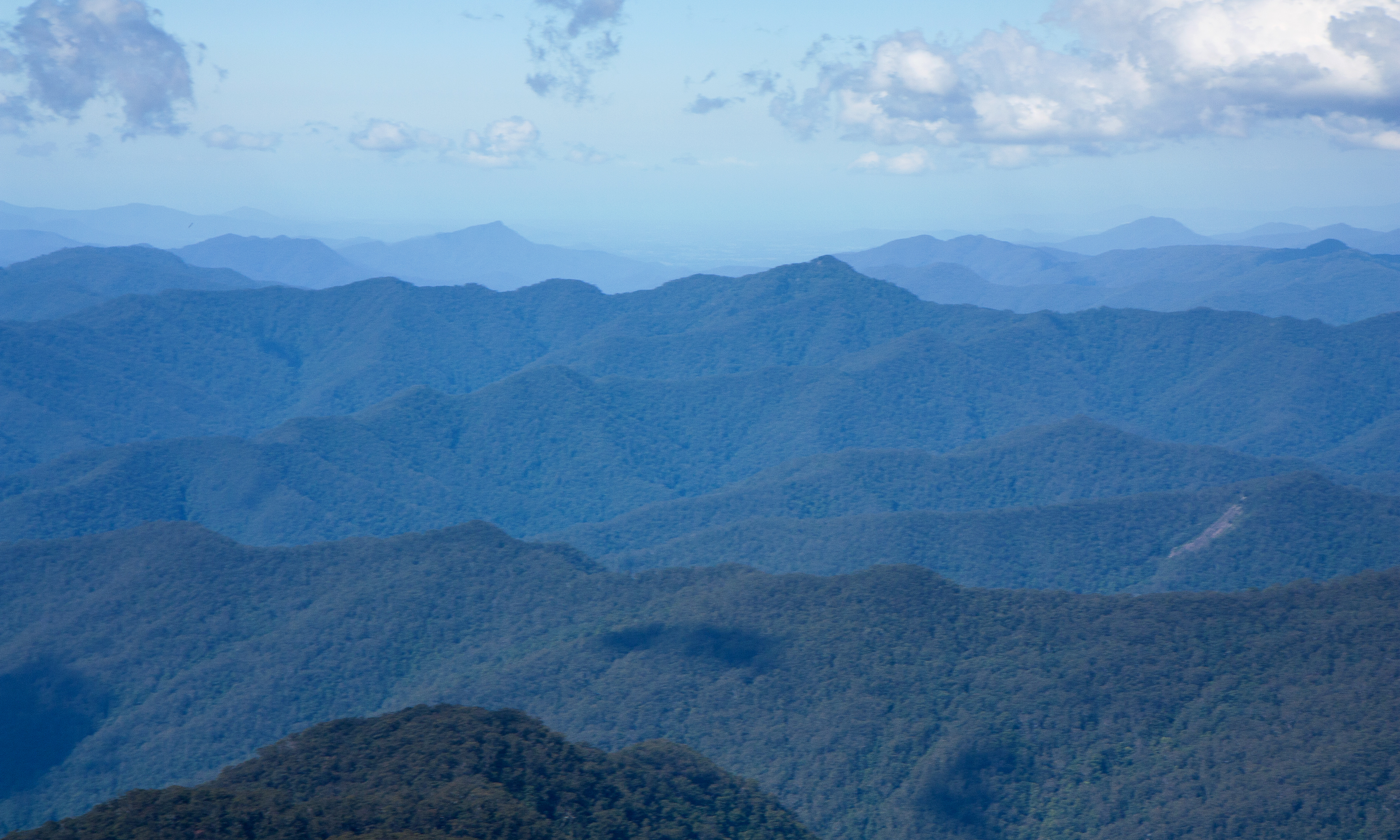
- View west over the New England Tablelands from Point Lookout.

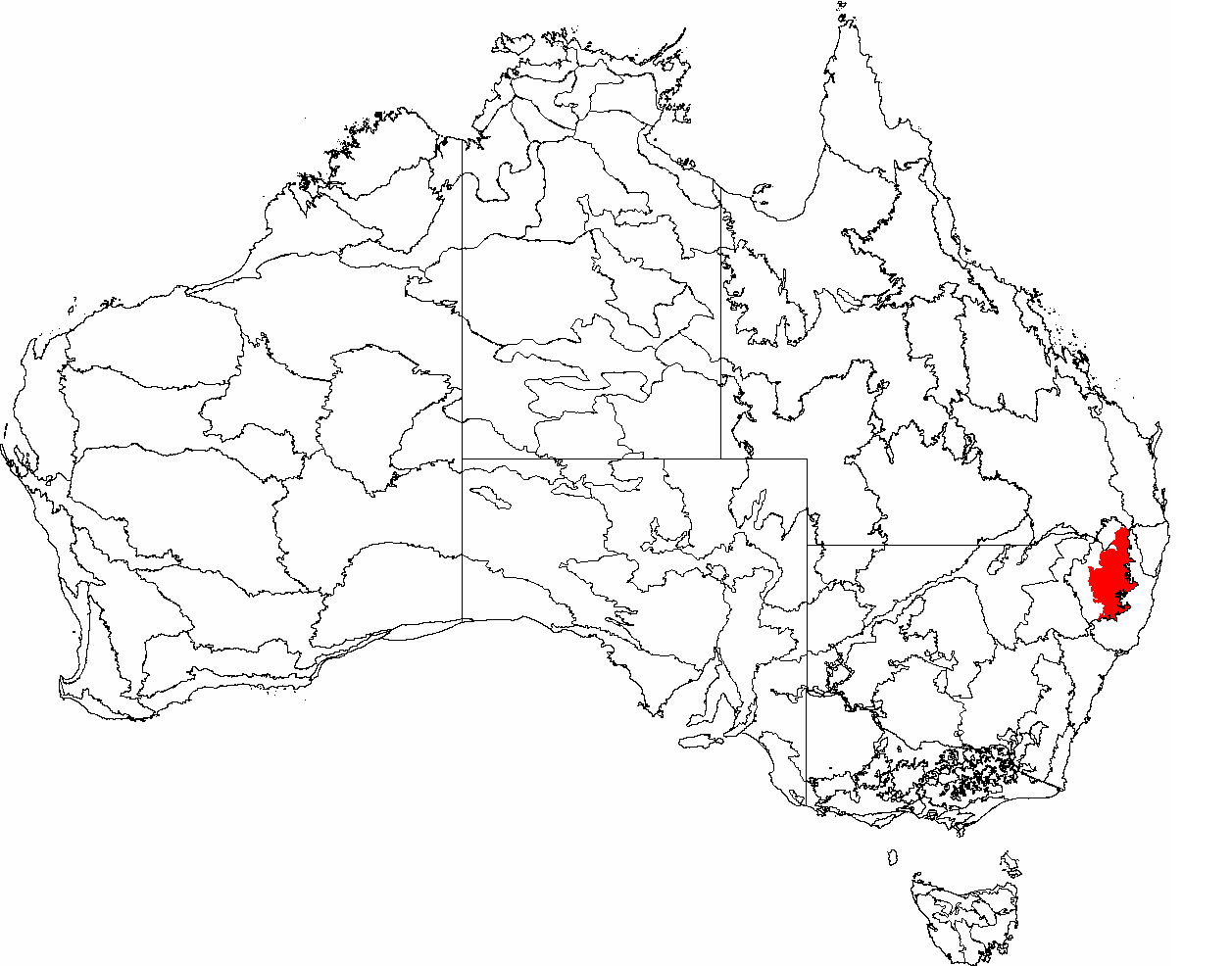
- The interim Australian bioregions, with New England Tablelands in red.
- Country: Australia
- State: Australia

Area
  - Total: 30,022 km^{2} (11,592 sq mi)
- Elevation: 600–1,500 m (2,000–4,900 ft)
- Mean max temp: 9–17 °C (48–63 °F)
- Mean min temp: −3.6–6 °C (25.5–42.8 °F)
- Annual rainfall: 653–1,765 mm (25.7–69.5 in)
Regions around New England Tablelands
| Nandewar | Nandewar | New South Wales North Coast |
| Nandewar | New England Tablelands | New South Wales North Coast |
| Nandewar | Nandewar | New South Wales North Coast |

New England Tablelands (code NET), an interim Australian bioregion, is located mainly in New South Wales, comprising 3,002,213 hectares (7,418,630 acres), of which 2,860,758 hectares (7,069,090 acres) or 95.23 per cent of the bioregion lies within New South Wales; and the residual within Queensland. This bioregion is one of the smaller bioregions in NSW, occupying 3.57 per cent of the state.

The New England Tableland Bioregion is a stepped plateau of hills and plains with elevations between 600 and 1,500 metres (2,000 and 4,900 ft) on Permian sedimentary rocks, intrusive granites and extensive Tertiary basalts. Rainfall varies considerably from 653 to 1,765 millimetres (25.7 to 69.5 in) and mean temperatures range from −3 to 17 °C (27 to 63 °F), based on changes with topography. In terms of plants, the region is dominated by stringy bark/box/peppermint species, including Eucalyptus caliginosa, E. nova-anglica, E. melliodora and E. blakelyi.

== Subregions ==
In the IBRA system it has the code of (NET), and it has nineteen sub-regions:

IBRA regions and subregions: IBRA7
| IBRA subregion | IBRA code | Area | |
| IBRA subregion | IBRA code | ha | acres |
|---|---|---|---|
| Bundarra Downs | NET01 | 151,867 | 375,270 |
| Beardy River Hills | NET02 | 24,625 | 60,850 |
| Walcha Plateau | NET03 | 473,825 | 1,170,850 |
| Armidale Plateau | NET04 | 290,577 | 718,030 |
| Wongwibinda Plateau | NET05 | 106,929 | 264,230 |
| Deepwater Downs | NET06 | 97,773 | 241,600 |
| Glenn Innes-Guyra Basalts | NET07 | 277,299 | 685,220 |
| Ebor Basalts | NET08 | 35,709 | 88,240 |
| Moredun Volcanics | NET09 | 117,461 | 290,250 |
| Severn River Volcanics | NET10 | 150,795 | 372,620 |
| Northeast Forest Lands | NET11 | 206,492 | 510,250 |
| Tenterfield Plateau | NET12 | 139,242 | 344,070 |
| Yarrowyck-Kentucky Downs | NET13 | 65,135 | 160,950 |
| Binghi Plateau | NET14 | 64,555 | 159,520 |
| Stanthorpe Plateau | NET15 | 267,999 | 662,240 |
| Eastern Nandewars | NET16 | 319,096 | 788,500 |
| Tingha Plateau | NET17 | 78,461 | 193,880 |
| Nightcap | NET18 | 113,767 | 281,120 |
| Round Mountain | NET19 | 20,606 | 50,920 |
