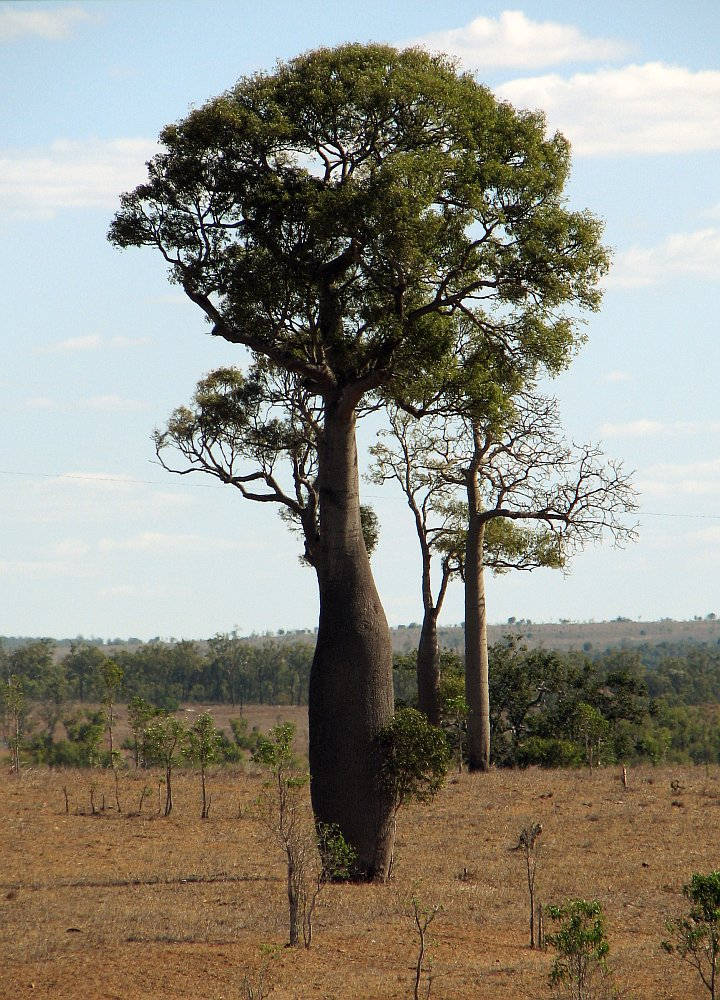

Conservation status
- Least Concern (IUCN 3.1)

Scientific classification
- Kingdom: Plantae
- Clade: Tracheophytes
- Clade: Angiosperms
- Clade: Eudicots
- Clade: Rosids
- Order: Malvales
- Family: Malvaceae
- Genus: Brachychiton
- Species: B. rupestris

Binomial name
- Brachychiton rupestris (T.Mitch. ex Lindl.) K.Schum.

Synonyms
- Delabechea rupestris T.Mitch. ex Lindl. Brachychiton delabechei F.Muell. Sterculia rupestris (T.Mitch. ex Lindl.) Benth. Brachychiton rupestre orth. var. K.A.W.Williams

= Brachychiton rupestris =

Queensland bottle tree

Species of tree native to Queensland, Australia

Brachychiton rupestris (commonly known as the narrow-leaved bottle tree or Queensland bottle tree) is a tree in the family Malvaceae, (Note: The genus Brachychiton was traditionally placed in the family Sterculiaceae, but that family, along with Bombacaceae and Tiliaceae, has been found to be polyphyletic and is now sunk into a more broadly-defined Malvaceae) endemic to the Australian state of Queensland. Described by Sir Thomas Mitchell and John Lindley in 1848, it earned its name from its bulbous trunk, which can be up to 3.5 metres (11 ft) in diameter at breast height (DBH). Reaching around 10–25 m (33–82 ft) high, the Queensland bottle tree is deciduous, losing its leaves seasonally, between September and December. The leaves are simple or divided, with one or more narrow leaf blades up to 11 centimetres (4 in) long and 2 cm (0.8 in) wide. Cream-coloured flowers appear from September to November, and are followed by woody, boat-shaped follicles that ripen from November to May. No subspecies are recognised.

As a drought deciduous and succulent tree, much like the baobab (Adansonia) of Madagascar, B. rupestris adapts readily to cultivation, and is quite tolerant of a range of soils and temperatures. It is a key component and emergent tree in the endangered central semi-evergreen vine thickets (also known as bottletree scrub) of the Queensland Brigalow Belt. Remnant trees are often left by farmers on cleared land for their value as shade and fodder trees, and as homes for various birds and animals.

== Description ==
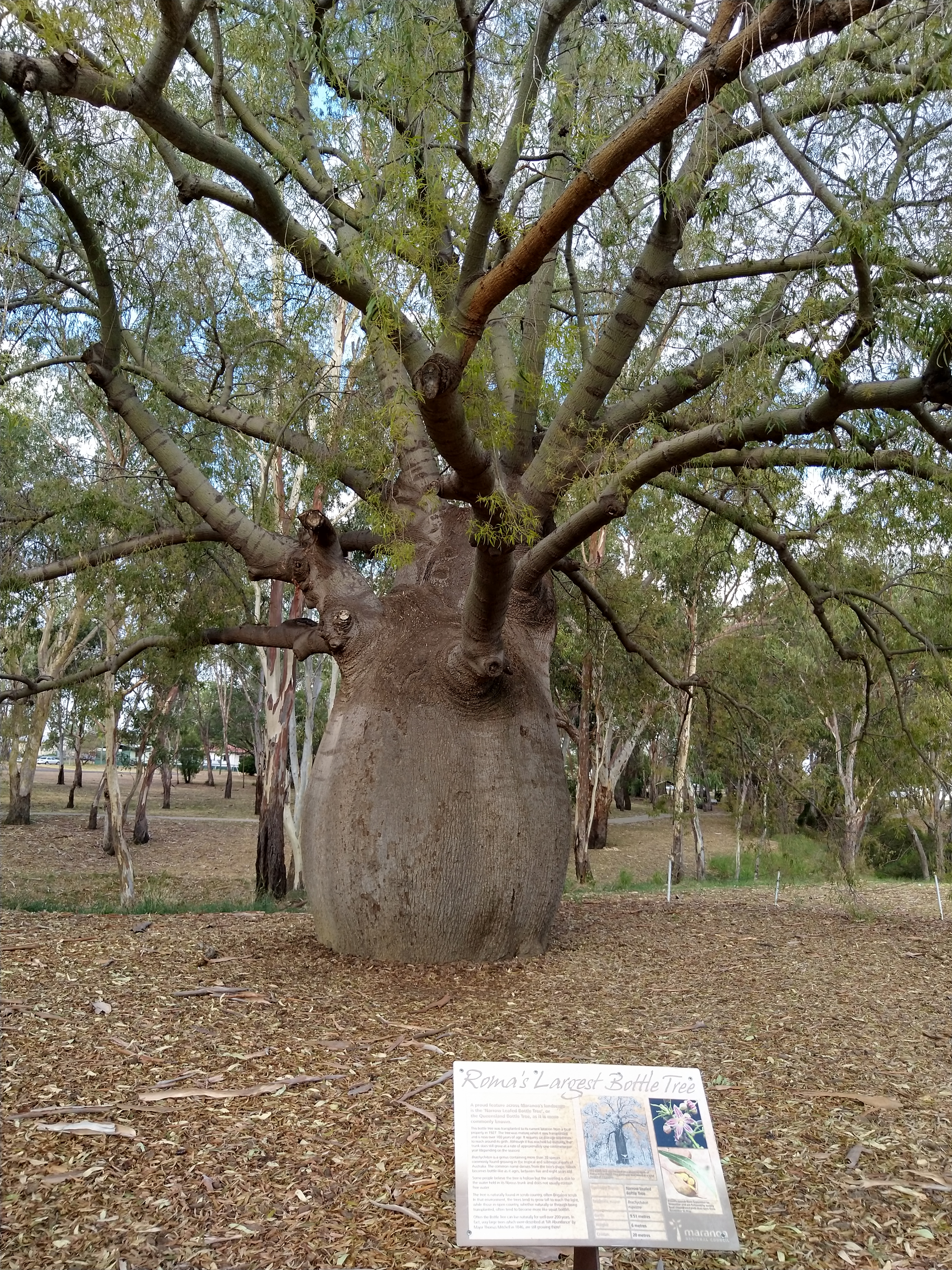
Largest bottle tree in Roma, Queensland, where the species is used extensively for street plantings

Brachychiton rupestris grows as a succulent tree reaching 10–20 m (33–66 ft), rarely 25 m (82 ft), in height, though plants in cultivation are usually shorter. The thick trunk is 5–15 m (16–49 ft) tall, with a 1–3.5 m (3.3–11.5 ft) diameter at breast height (DBH). It has dark grey bark and is marked by shallow tessellation and deeper fissures. Smaller branches are light green or grey, as are the trunks of immature trees. Like those of all members of the genus, the leaves are alternately arranged along the stems.

B. rupestris is deciduous. Trees in their native habitat are typically leafless between September and December; the timing, duration and extent of leaf drop may be affected by extremes of rainfall or drought. Sometimes trees shed leaves from only some branches. On every tree, the leaves vary in shape, ranging from narrow and elliptic to deeply divided. The upper surface is glossy, contrasting with a pale undersurface. The adult leaf blades are 4–11 cm (1.6–4.3 in) long and 0.8–2 cm (0.3–0.8 in) wide with pointed (acuminate or apiculate) tips. They have a raised midrib on the upper and lower surface, with 12–25 pairs of lateral veins that are more prominent on the upper surface, arising at 50–60 degrees from the midrib. The compound juvenile leaves have 3–9 spear-shaped (lanceolate) or linear lobes. These each measure 4–14 cm (1.6–5.5 in) long and 0.3–1 cm (0.1–0.4 in) wide.

Panicles of creamy-yellow flowers with red markings appear from September to November in the species' native range. These arise from axillary buds on end branches. Each panicle contains 10–30 flowers and is 3–8 cm (1.2–3.1 in) long, and each flower is 0.5–1 cm (0.2–0.4 in) long and 1.3–1.8 cm (0.5–0.7 in) wide. The length of the lobes of the perianth is more than half the perianth diameter. Like all Brachychiton species, B. rupestris is monoecious—each plant has distinct male and female flowers. Male flowers have 15 stamens, with pale yellow anthers, while female flowers have cream or white stigmas surrounded by rudimentary stellate (star-shaped) carpels, which sit atop the ovaries.

Groups of 3 to 5 woody boat-shaped follicles, each containing 4 to 8 (or occasionally up to 12) seeds, develop from November to May. The follicles, smooth on the outer surface and hairy inside, split along their length to reveal seeds. The seeds, which are ovoid with a smooth surface, and 6–7 mm (0.24–0.28 in) long by 3.5–4.5 mm (0.14–0.18 in) wide, are covered by a hairy coating known as the exotesta.

The closely related Proserpine bottle tree (Brachychiton compactus) that occurs only in the vicinity of the town of Proserpine can be distinguished by its more oval leaves, more compact flower heads, and longer ellipsoid follicles. The undescribed Ormeau bottle tree has brighter lime-green new foliage and leaves but is otherwise similar to the Proserpine bottle tree.

== Taxonomy and naming ==
Leaves

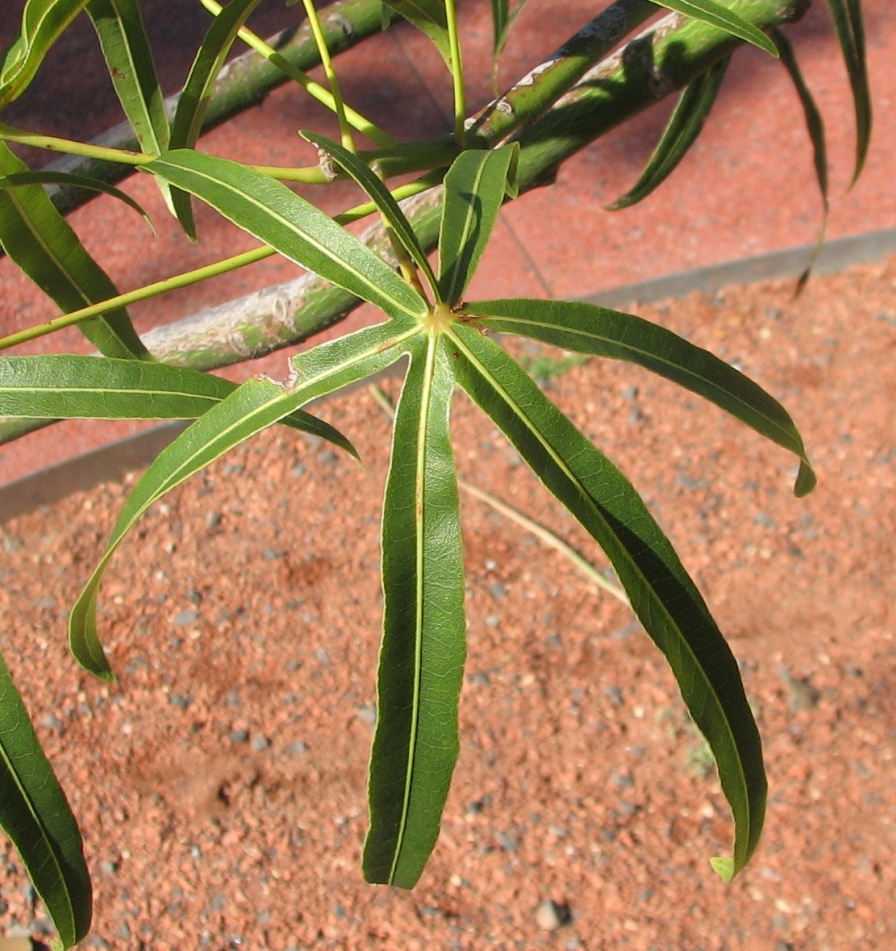
Juvenile

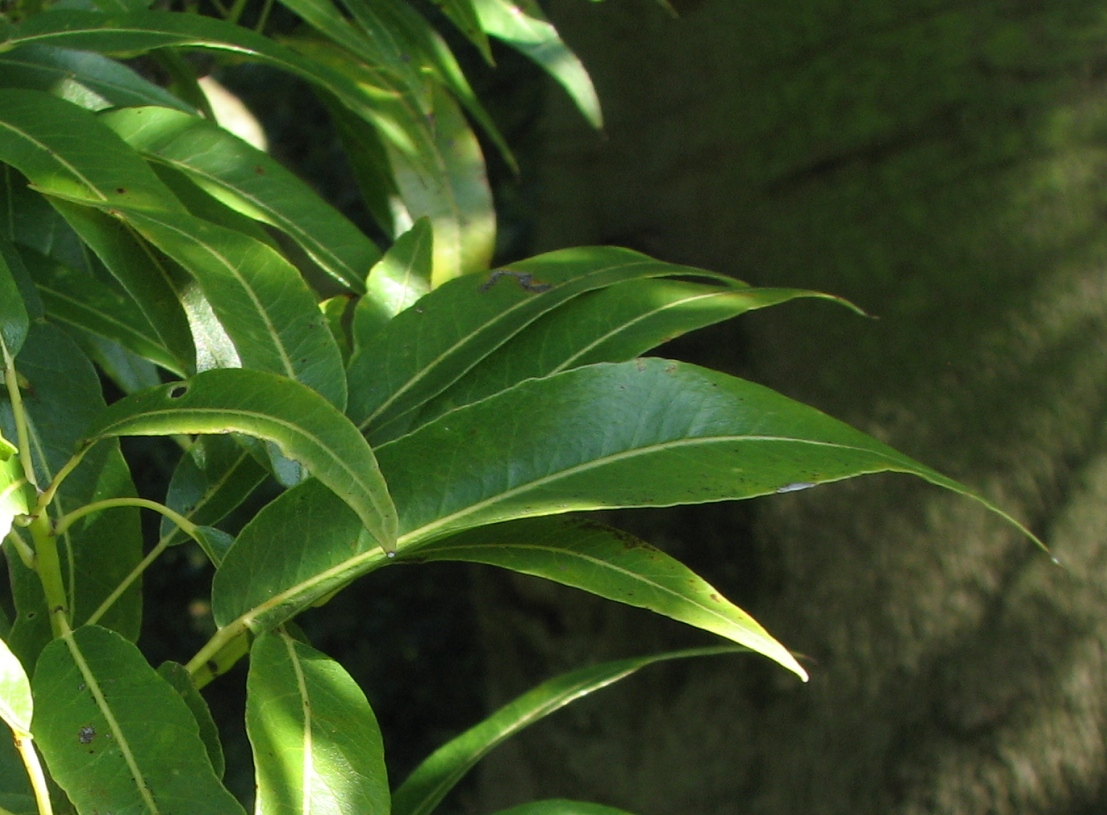
Adult

The species came to the attention of the scientific community when explorer Sir Thomas Mitchell observed the trees on his expedition through Queensland in 1848 and published an account in Journal of an Expedition into the Interior of Tropical Australia in the same year. He came across them as he ascended Mount Abundance near present-day Roma, remarking that "The trunk bulged out in the middle like a barrel, to nearly twice the diameter at the ground, or of that at the first springing of the branches above. These were small in proportion to their great girth, and the whole tree looked very odd." In the same publication, English botanist John Lindley provided the first formal description. Lindley placed it in the genus Delabechea as the sole representative—Delabechea rupestris. The genus name was selected by Mitchell to honour the director of the British Geological Survey, Henry De la Beche, while the Latin specific epithet rupestris (meaning 'living among rocks') alludes to the rocky hilltop habitat of specimens observed by Mitchell. Ferdinand von Mueller, the Government Botanist in Victoria, renamed it Brachychiton delabechei in 1862, incorporating the genus Delabechea into Brachychiton.

In his landmark Flora Australiensis, English botanist George Bentham published the first key for the nine described species of Brachychiton, and relegated them to a section of Sterculia. Hence the Queensland bottle tree became Sterculia rupestris. Von Mueller maintained his recognition of Brachychiton as a separate genus. German botanist Otto Kuntze challenged the generic name Sterculia in 1891, on the grounds that the name Clompanus took precedence. He republished the Queensland bottle tree as Clompanus rupestris. German botanist Karl Moritz Schumann gave it its current binomial name in 1893, which was accepted by Achille Terraciano of the Orto botanico di Palermo and subsequent authorities, and remains current.

In 1988, Gordon Guymer of the Queensland Herbarium published a taxonomic revision of Brachychiton; he classified B. rupestris in the section Delabechea along with the related and newly described Proserpine bottle tree. A third species, from southeast Queensland, has been recognised but not yet described. Unique to the section, all three species have bulbous trunks and can have large cavities in the vertical wood parenchyma. The genus Brachychiton lies within an Australasian clade within the subfamily Sterculioideae (previously family Sterculiaceae) in a large broadly defined Malvaceae. It is only distantly related to Sterculia, belonging to a different clade within the Sterculioideae.

The name of the genus is derived from the Greek brachys, 'short', and chiton, 'tunic', a reference to the loose seed coats. Brachychiton was for many years misconstrued as being of neuter gender—first by the genus describers Heinrich Wilhelm Schott and Stephan Endlicher and later by von Mueller and others—with the specific names then incorrectly amended. Thus the bottle tree's binomial was recorded as Brachychiton rupestre, now regarded as an orthographical variant. Besides Queensland bottle tree, common names for the species include narrow-leaved bottle tree and bottle tree.

Brachychiton × turgidulus is a naturally occurring hybrid cross of B. rupestris with the kurrajong B. populneus subsp. populneus. It is particularly prevalent east of Boonah.

== Distribution and habitat ==
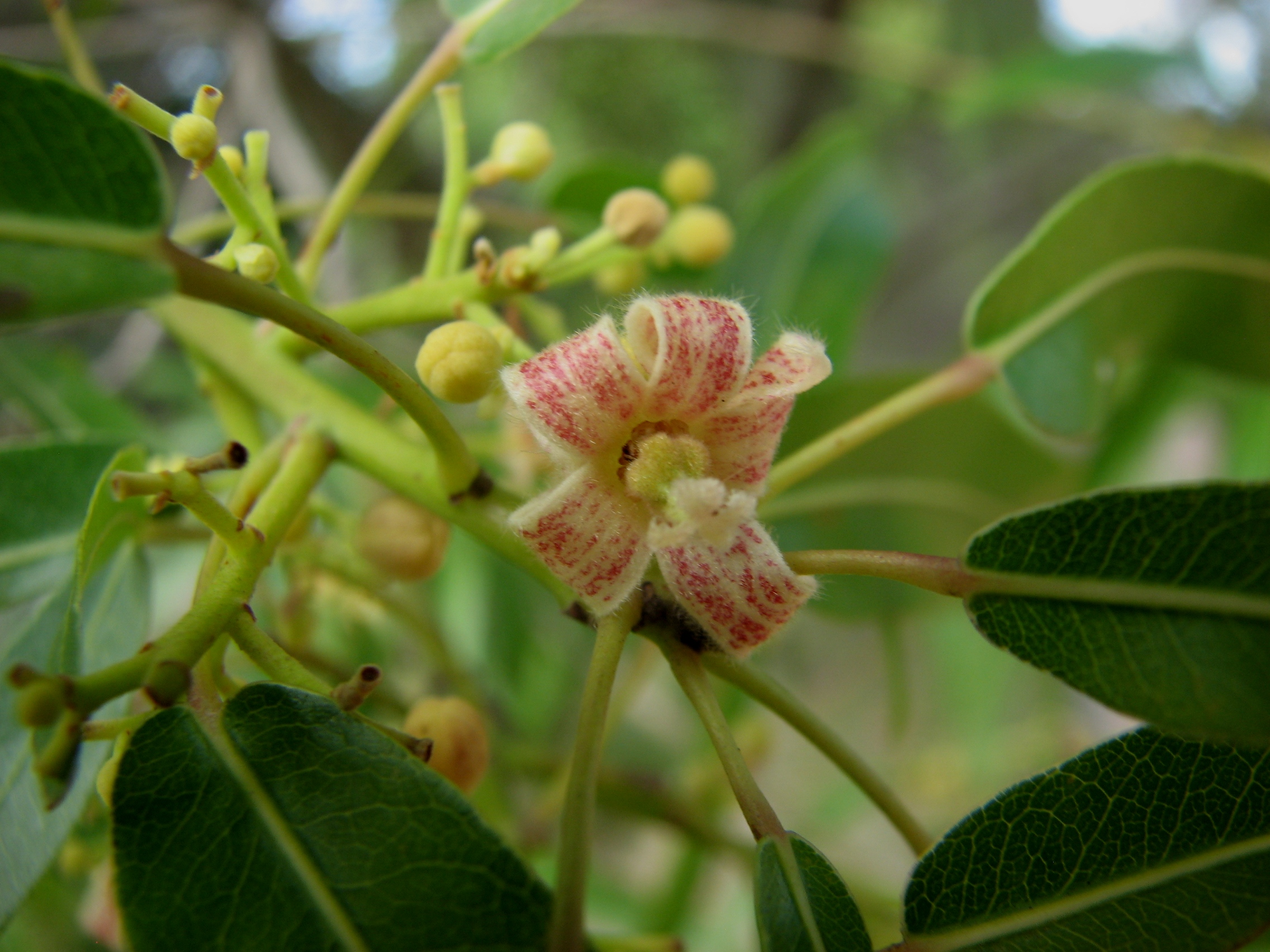
Female flower

Brachychiton rupestris is found in central Queensland from latitude 22° S to 28° S, with the western limits of its range defined by the 500 mm rainfall isohyet. It grows on the tops and slopes of hills or ridges in low hilly country, in clay, shale, or basalt soils. It is an emergent tree in forests dominated by brigalow (Acacia harpophylla), hoop pine (Araucaria cunninghamii), or ooline (Cadellia pentastylis). It is always present in the Central semi-evergreen vine thicket—also known as Bottletree Scrub—of the Brigalow Belt. Other common species include broad-leaved bottle tree (Brachychiton australis) and belah (Casuarina cristata). The narrow-leaved bottle tree is replaced by the kurrajong in similar communities in New South Wales.

=== Conservation ===
Although the species status under Queensland's Nature Conservation Act is least concern, it is an emergent tree species in an endangered ecosystem known as "semi-evergreen vine thickets of the Brigalow Belt (North and South) and Nandewar bioregions", listed under the Commonwealth EPBC Act, and is declining across its range. Furthermore, the health of trees in cleared areas may be compromised. The species is conserved within its natural habitat in a number of National Parks including Auburn River, Benarkin, Bunya Mountains, Coalstoun Lakes, Dipperu, Good Night Scrub, Humboldt, Isla Gorge and Tregole.

== Ecology ==
Brachychiton rupestris has been recorded as a host plant for the mistletoe species Dendrophthoe glabrescens. Insects hosted by the species include the pale cotton stainer bug, a pest of cotton crops, and the kurrajong leaf roller caterpillar that chews on the foliage and rolls individual leaves, within which it then pupates. Bottle tree scrub is a key habitat of the near threatened black-breasted buttonquail. Brachychiton rupestris can withstand bushfires and responds by flowering and putting forth new foliage afterwards.

== Uses ==
Aboriginal people made use of the trees through eating the roots of young plants and by consuming secretions from the trunk that were induced by wounds. Fibre obtained from the species was used to make nets. The leaves have also been used for fodder, and Queensland farmers often leave bottle trees as a potential food source when land is cleared. During drought conditions, whole trees have been felled to feed stock. The soft edible pulp inside the trunk is exposed by removing the bark. The pulp is energy-rich but protein-poor, and occasional cases of nitrate poisoning have led to cattle deaths.

== Cultivation ==
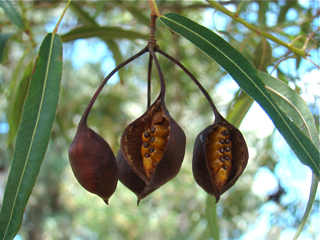
Open follicles split longitudinally to reveal seeds inside. The follicle interior is lined with hairs that can irritate skin.

Bottle trees are commonly found planted in streets and parks, on farms, and as features in gardens. An avenue in Roma, Queensland, was planted between 1918 and 1920, each tree representing one of 93 local men killed in World War I. The species has been cultivated as an indoor plant and a bonsai subject.

Bottle trees grow best in well-drained, slightly acidic soil, in full sunshine. They are suited to cultivation in regional climates equivalent to USDA hardiness zones 9 to 12. In the first stages of growth, the bottle tree is very slow-growing, and the formation of the unique bottle shape is not visible until the tree is about 5 to 8 years old. Mature trees transplant easily, and can withstand intervals of up to three months between digging and replanting without detriment. Bottle trees grown from seed may take up to 20 years to flower. Flowering takes place after adult leaves have appeared.

Plants are readily propagated from seed. As seed is surrounded by irritating hairs within the pod, extraction requires care. Stem cuttings of semi-mature growth can be taken in late summer and require the application of rooting hormones and bottom heat.

== See also ==
- Adansonia gregorii, the bottle tree or baobab of Western Australia and the Northern Territory.
