= Bowman Creek (disambiguation) =

Bowman Creek is a tributary of the Susquehanna River in Pennsylvania.

Bowman Creek may also refer to:

- Bowman Creek (New South Wales), a watercourse in Australia
- Bowman Creek (Schoharie Creek tributary), a watercourse near Burtonsville, New York
- Bowman Creek, Pennsylvania, an unincorporated community in Monroe Township, Wyoming County

== See also ==
- Bowmans Creek, a river in Montgomery County, New York
