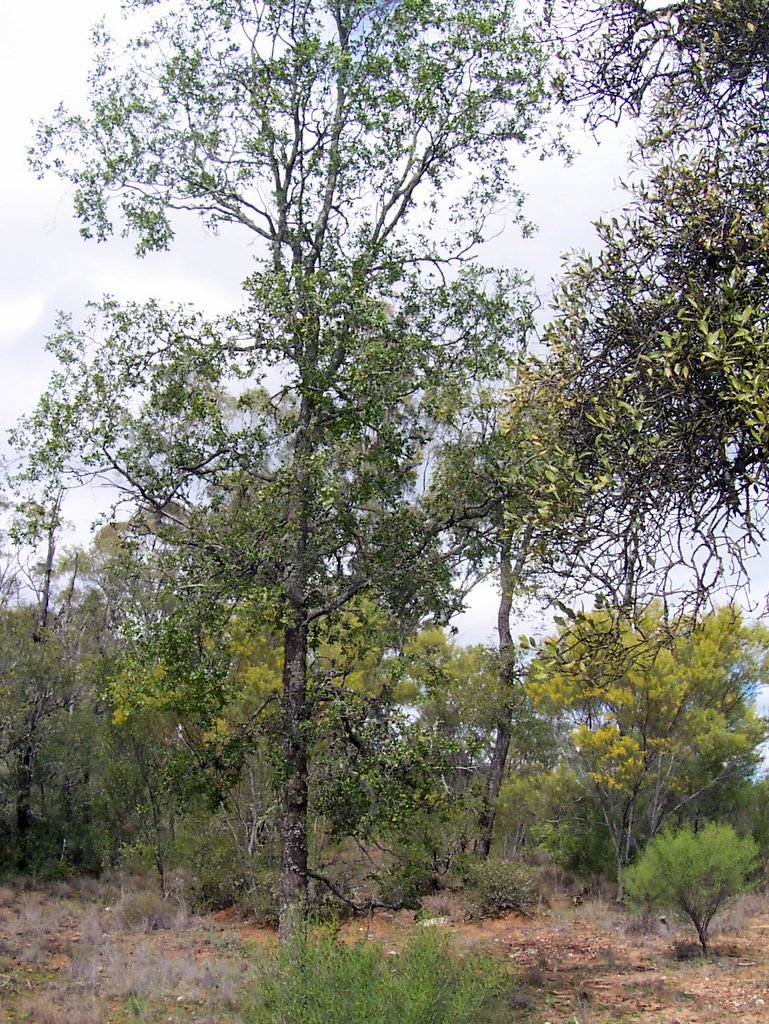
- At Gamilaroi Nature Reserve

Conservation status
- Vulnerable (EPBC Act)

Scientific classification
- Kingdom: Plantae
- Clade: Tracheophytes
- Clade: Angiosperms
- Clade: Eudicots
- Clade: Rosids
- Order: Fabales
- Family: Surianaceae
- Genus: Cadellia; F.Muell.
- Species: C. pentastylis

Binomial name
- Cadellia pentastylis F.Muell.

= Cadellia =

Genus of trees

Cadellia is a monotypic genus of trees in the botanical family Surianaceae. The sole species, Cadellia pentastylis, commonly known as ooline, is a medium to large tree with bright green leaves and rough tile-pattern bark. It has rain forest origins dating from the Pleistocene Era when much of Australia was wetter than it is today. It grows on moderately fertile soils, preferably those suited for agriculture or pasture development. Due to extensive forest clearing, it is now considered a vulnerable plant in Australia.

== Description ==
The Cadellia tree grows to be about 10 m—rarely 25 m in height. It has leaves that are alternate, undivided and obovate or oval in shape. Flowering occurs from about October to December. The flowers have five white petals, about 5-7 mm in length. The ooline's fruit is brownish, wrinkled, and remains surrounded by five red sepals at its base. Fruiting generally occurs from November to December. The fruit's edibility for humans is not stated.

== Distribution ==
Cadellia pentastylis is listed as vulnerable under the Australian Environment and Biodiversity Conservation Act 1999. Small and typically fragmented stands of ooline may be found in scattered localities on the lower western slopes of Australia's great dividing range between latitudes of 24°S to 30°S. Populations are known from the North Western Slopes of New South Wales, such as around Mount Black Jack near Gunnedah, Tenterfield, Terry Hie Hie, and Moree. Ooline can also be found in Sundown National Park and Tregole National Park in Queensland.

== Taxonomy ==
The Cadellia is one of four sections of the Fabales clade. Its pollen is prolate spheroidal, striate with a granular aperture surface membrane. Pollen morphology has linked the Surianaceae in a clade comprising Polygalaceae, Fabaceae, and Quillaja. There are also strong genetic affinities between the Mexican endemic genus Recchia and Cadellia. These can be determined by different types of microscopy, such as light microscopy, scanning electron microscopy, and transmission electron microscopy.

== Gallery ==
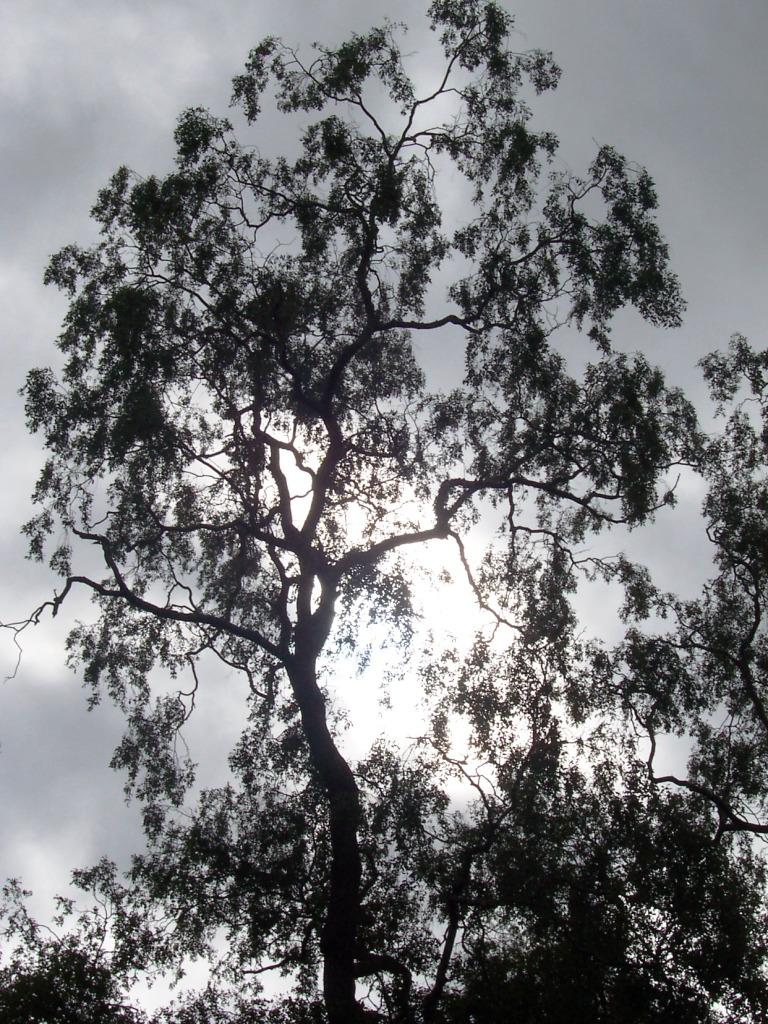
Ooline, Gamilaroi Nature Reserve, NSW

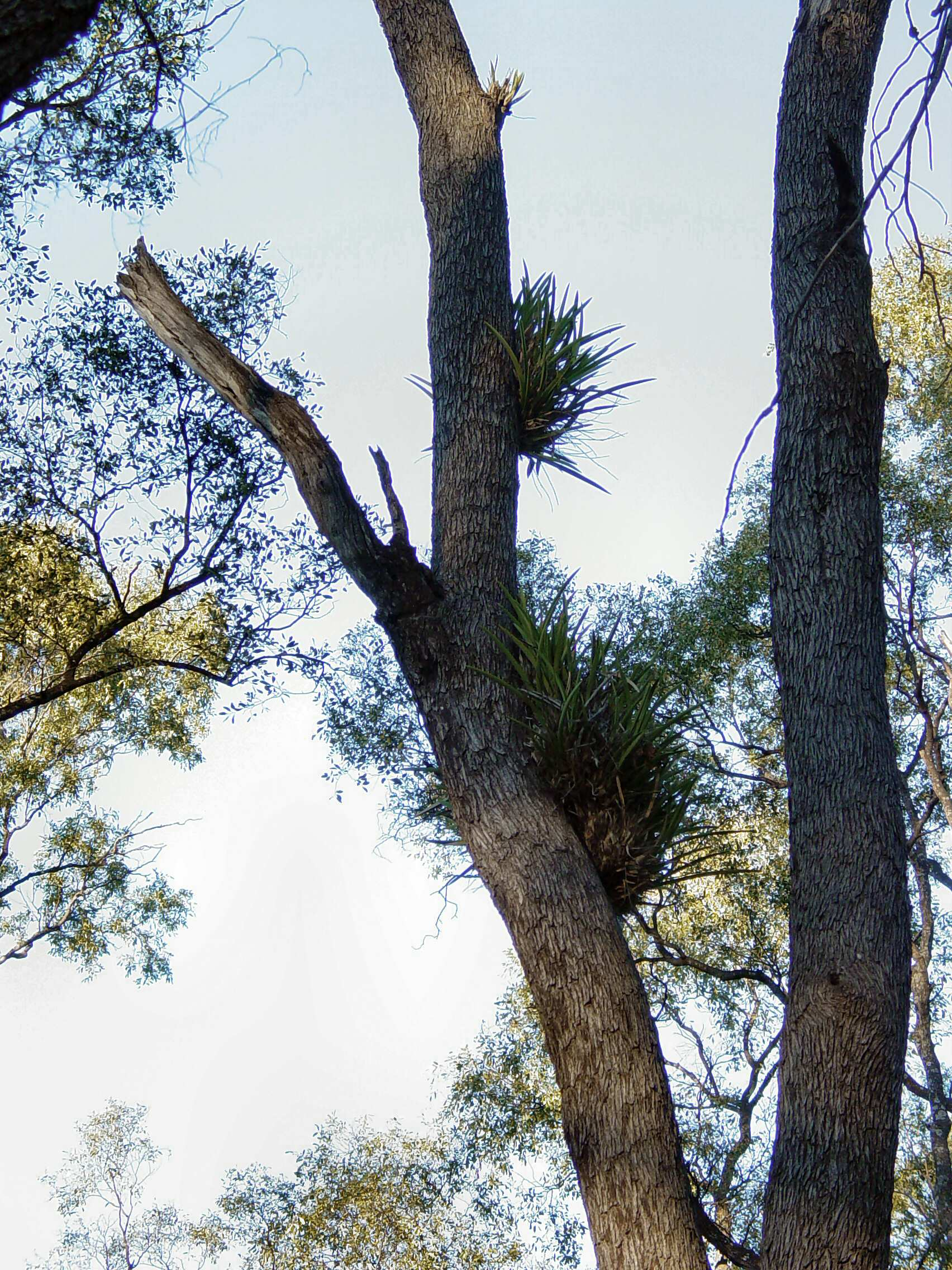
Black orchids growing on ooline, Tregole National Park

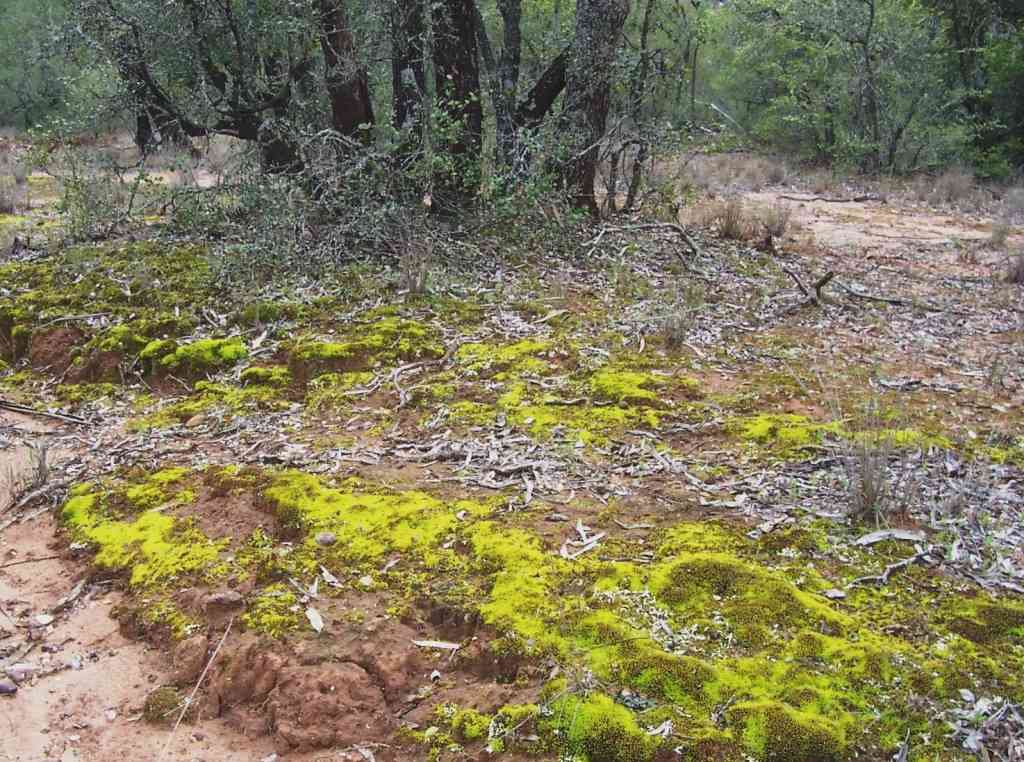
Base of an ooline thicket, with associated mosses, Gamilaroi Nature Reserve, NSW

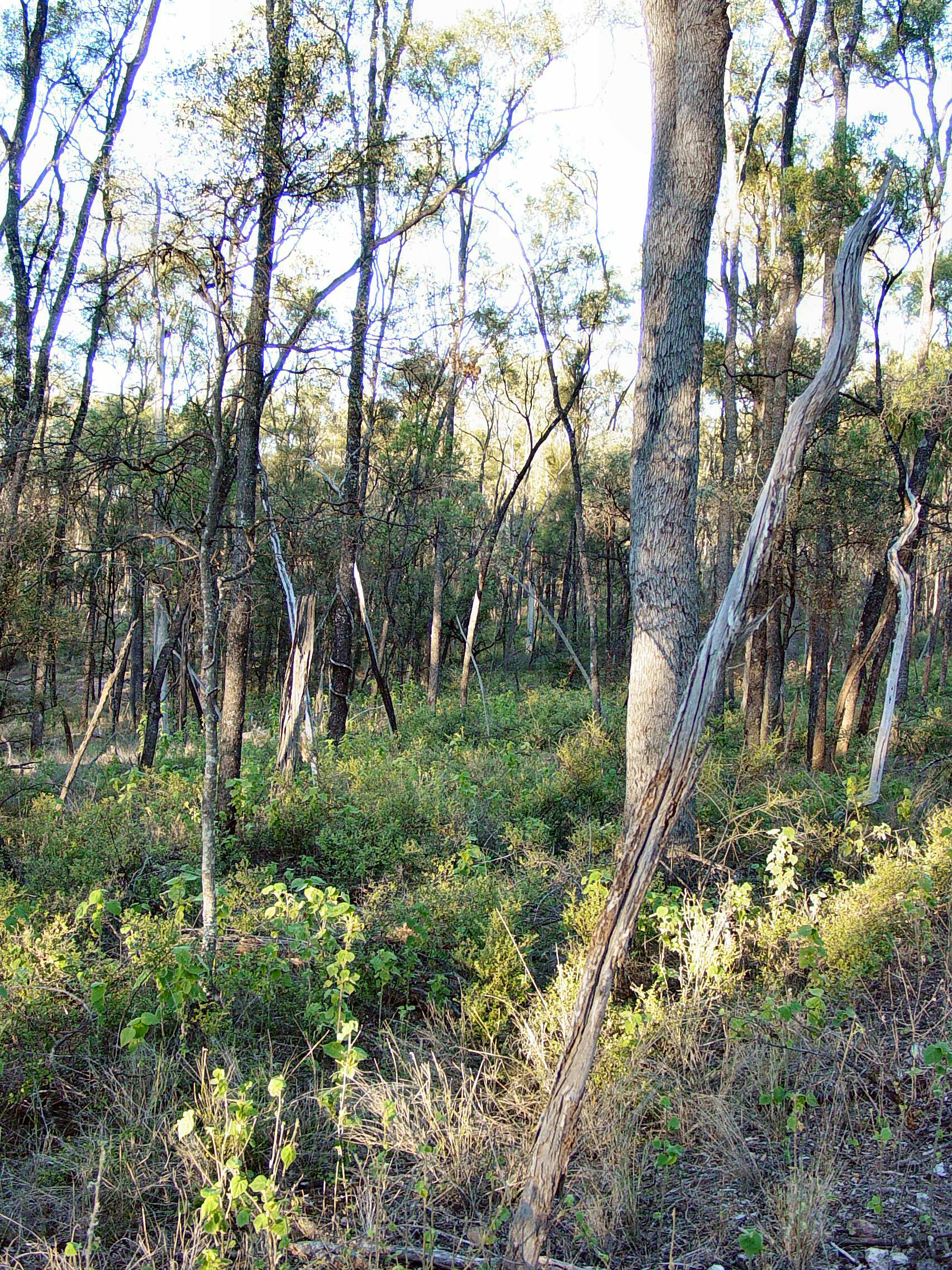
Stand of Cadellia pentastylis in Tregole National Park
