= Brigalow Creek =

River in New South Wales, Australia

Brigalow Creek is a creek in north west New South Wales, Australia. The headwaters are located south of Mount Jerrybang at 29.692753°S 150.260553°E where the elevation is 427 metres and the creek finishes by flowing into Tycannah Creek, north of the village of Terry Hie Hie at an elevation of 271 metres and at coordinates 29.701622°S 150.095195°E. The creek's overall length is 21.7 kilometres and loses 166 metres of elevation over this distance.
