= William Guilfoyle =

English landscape gardener and botanist

William Robert Guilfoyle
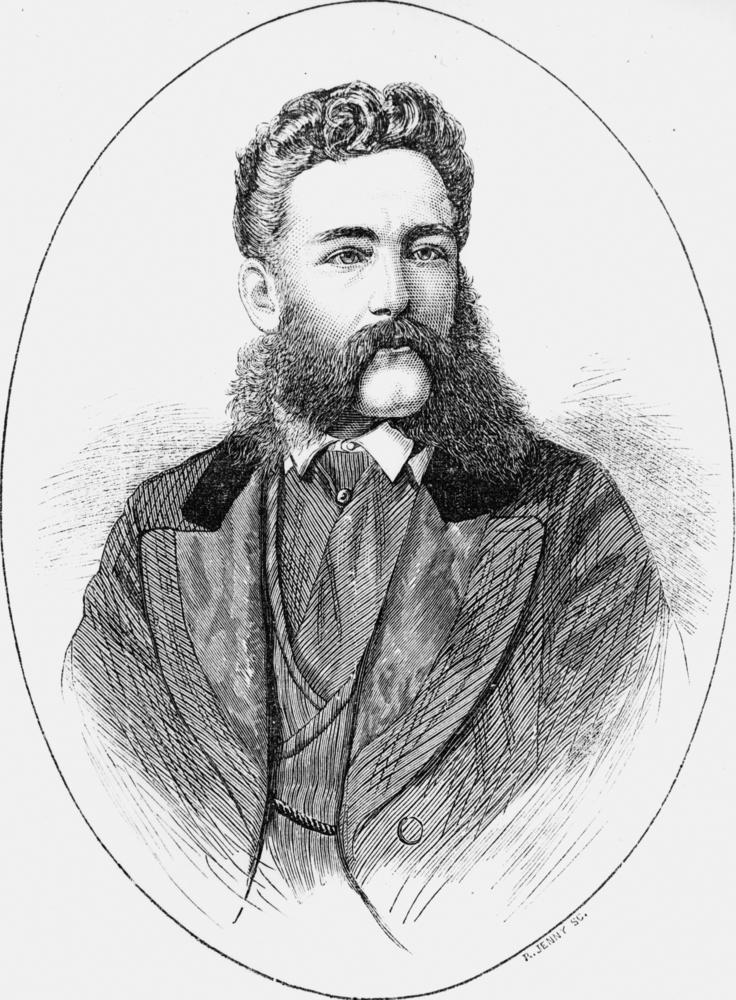
- William Robert Guilfoyle
- Born: 8 December 1840; Chelsea, England
- Died: 25 June 1912 (aged 71); Jolimont, Australia
- Scientific career
- Fields: Biologist, landscape gardener and botanist
- Author abbrev. (botany): Guilf.

William Robert Guilfoyle (8 December 1840 – 25 June 1912) was an English landscape gardener and botanist in Victoria, Australia, acknowledged as the architect of the Royal Botanic Gardens, Melbourne and was responsible for the design of many parks and gardens in Melbourne and regional Victoria.

== Early life and family ==
Guilfoyle was born in Chelsea, England, to Charlotte (née Delafosse) and Michael Guilfoyle (1809–1884), a landscape gardener and nurseryman. William was one of four children. The family migrated to Sydney in 1849 on board the Steadfast. Later after arriving, Michael Guilfoyle established Guilfoyle's Exotic Nursery in Double Bay on land owned by Thomas Sutcliffe Mort. Here he was a leading supplier of the exotic Jacaranda tree using his own grafting methods.

William Guilfoyle was privately educated at Lyndhurst College, Glebe where he received botanical instruction by William Woolls, William Sharp MacLeay (1792–1865) and John MacGillivray (1821–1867), who all encouraged him to follow in his father's career. In 1868 William Guilfoyle was appointed to the scientific staff of HMS Challenger that travelled around the Pacific Ocean. He recorded the voyage with a series of watercolour sketches and a detailed account in the Sydney Mail. Guilfoyle settled in the Tweed River valley where he grew tobacco and sugar cane and first met the noted German botanist, Ferdinand von Mueller.

== Melbourne Botanic Gardens ==
In April 1873 Mueller created the genus Guilfoylia and described William Guilfoyle as "distinguished as a collector [who] evidenced great ardour" and held high hopes for his collecting ability. Mueller's opinion changed when Guilfoyle was appointed to take his place as Director of the Royal Botanic Gardens, Melbourne on 21 July 1873. He accused Guilfoyle of being a "nurseryman [with] no claims to scientific knowledge whatever" and of getting the job due to being related to the wife of the responsible Minister. Mueller subsequently abolished Guilfoylia as part of the genus of Cadellia in his botanical census of 1882.

Mueller had adopted a scientific and educational approach to the Botanic Gardens, which had come in for criticism by influential Melburnians, who wanted a more aesthetic gardens for recreational use. William Guilfoyle set about creating the Gardens' world-famous "picturesque" landscape style. Over the next 35 years, Guilfoyle sculpted sweeping lawns, meandering paths and glittering lakes, creating a series of vistas offering a surprise around every corner. The swamp and lagoon were separated from the Yarra River under the direction of Carlo Catani (1852–1918), a civil engineer with the Public Works Department, allowing Guilfoyle to create the chain of ornamental lakes further adding to the beauty of the gardens.

A feature of Guilfoyle's designs were the erection of over a dozen structures in the Gardens, including pavilions, summer houses, rotundas and 'temples'. These structures were generally located at junctions along the path system and took advantage of an attractive view. They were also practical buildings providing much needed shelter from Melbourne's hot summer sun and unpredictable rain. The Rose Pavilion, for instance, was used for band recitals during the summer months. Another, the "Temple of the Winds" monument was dedicated to Governor Charles La Trobe and erected by William Guilfoyle in the Botanical Gardens. The temple is composed of 10 columns instead of the normal 8 or 12 which are more easily divisible by the four points of the compass. According to historian Ken Duxbury, such structures added a picturesque charm to the landscape, highlighting points of visual interest along the trail of the paths and serving a role not dissimilar to the grottos, classical temples, follies, hermitages and pagodas along the circuit walks of the classic 'English Landscape School' gardens such as Stourhead. In addition to these structures, Guilfoyle added a series of large iron archways to highlight entry to the rest houses and to mark points of transition like 'doorways'. About ten of these archways still remain. He also established an extensive medicinal garden in the 1880s at the Gardens and opened a Museum of Economic Botany and Plant Products in 1892.

== Public parks in Melbourne ==
Other public work included additional tree planting and landscaping of Kings Domain and refining the original garden design of Government House "with many fine mature trees, including conifers, Australian rainforest species and deciduous trees, which are characteristic of the era and which also reflect Guilfoyle's personal taste" (Victorian Heritage register). The Carlton Gardens, now a World Heritage Site, was landscaped for the Melbourne International Exhibition held in 1880 by several leading landscape designers and horticulturists including Clement Hodgkinson, William Sangster, Nicholas Bickford, and William Guilfoyle.

The gardens at Aspendale Racecourse were designed by William Guilfoyle.

In 1902 William Guilfoyle transformed the ornamental pond in the Treasury Gardens into a Japanese Garden, however the garden was demolished after the Second World War.

== Regional botanic gardens ==
Shortly after completing the major landscaping of the Royal Botanic Gardens in Melbourne in 1879, Guilfoyle designed several Botanic gardens in regional Victorian towns:

- Camperdown Botanic gardens which now features an arboretum, rare examples of Himalayan oak and a statue of Scottish poet Robbie Burns, which once stood at Tydenham Castle, near London. Several street-tree elm plantings in Camperdown were designed by Guilfoyle.
- Colac Botanic gardens in Queen street located on the shores of Lake Colac, were established in 1868, remodelled in 1910 by Guilfoyle and include a huge diversity of plants with many old and rare trees and a rose arbour.
- Hamilton Botanic gardens from 1881. Set in four acres (16,000 m²), the gardens are distinguished by rare botanic species, a superbly restored rotunda, a small zoo and playground and the ornate Thomson Fountain. The National Trust of Australia classified the gardens in 1990 with eight tree species listed on the Register of Significant Trees in Victoria.
- Horsham botanic gardens located by the Wimmera River.
- Koroit botanic gardens form part of a large, central recreational area.
- Warrnambool's botanic gardens featured wide curving paths, rare trees, a lily pond with ducks, a fernery and a band rotunda.

== Private Gardens ==
He also undertook private landscape design work which included Nellie Melba's Coombe Cottage at Coldstream; Moritz Michaelis's Linden in Acland Street, Mawallok between Skipton and Beaufort for Philip and Mary Russell in 1909, St Kilda; Werribee Park for the Chirnside brothers; and two gardens near Birregurra, "Mooleric" – a four-acre (16,000 m²) private garden registered under the Heritage Act as being of state and national significance and "Turkeith" for Mr. And Mrs. Urquhart Ramsay.

The gardens around Parliament House, Melbourne were designed by Clement Hodgkinson and William Guilfoyle and feature the Parliament Gardens, a small triangular park which features the Coles Fountain and provides pleasant views of Parliament House, St Patrick's Cathedral, the Old Synagogue, the Old Baptist Church and the Eastern Hill Fire Station. They became a public reserve in 1934.

The Parliament House Gardens, designed by Guilfoyle, have restricted access and are used by parliamentarians and guests, and for official garden parties. The garden contains The Federal Oak which was planted in 1890 by Sir Henry Parkes; a plaque recognising the efforts of Vida Goldstein; and an 'oriental-style' pavilion.

Guilfoyle also wrote extensively for the Bankers' Magazine of Australasia, the Victorian Naturalist, and two guide books (1902, 1908) to the Melbourne Botanic Gardens. He also wrote on Australian plants, including Australian Plants Suitable for Gardens, Parks, Timber Reserves etc (1911). Guilfoyle retired from landscape design in 1909, living at Chatsworth in Jolimont Road, Jolimont and died on 25 June 1912.

== Legacy ==
Eucalyptus guilfoylei was named in honour of Guilfoyle. Also from the family Surianaceae, Guilfoylia monostylis.

The Guilfoyle Lawn in the Melbourne Botanic Gardens and more recently in 2013 with the construction of an apartment tower opposite the Botanic Gardens in nearby Coventry Street SouthBank called The Guilfoyle.
