= Berrygil Creek =

Creek in New South Wales, Australia

Berrygil Creek is a creek in north west New South Wales, Australia. It is 25.1 km in length and joins up with Tycannah Creek at 29.803493°S 150.155655°E. Beginning at an elevation of 365m at 30.089536°S 150.088876°E, Berrygil Creek falls 64m over its distance to an elevation of 301m.
