= Recchia simplicifolia =

Conservation status
- Endangered (IUCN 3.1)

Scientific classification
- Kingdom: Plantae
- Clade: Tracheophytes
- Clade: Angiosperms
- Clade: Eudicots
- Clade: Rosids
- Order: Fabales
- Family: Surianaceae
- Genus: Recchia
- Species: R. simplicifolia

Binomial name
- Recchia simplicifolia Wendt & Lott

Species of tree

Recchia simplicifolia is a species of plant in the family Surianaceae.

It is a tropical tree endemic to Oaxaca and Veracruz states in Mexico.
