= Tycannah Creek =

River in New South Wales, Australia

The Tycannah Creek, a watercourse that is part of the Barwon catchment of the Murray-Darling basin, is located in the Orana region of New South Wales, Australia.

The creek rises on the northern side of the Nandewar Range and flows into the Mehi River downstream from Moree. On its way to the Mehi River, it flows through the village of Terry Hie Hie. There are five main creeks feed into Tycannah Creek which are Bald Hill Creek, Crossing Creek, Bowman Creek, Berrygil Creek and Brigalow Creek. From the upper most point to when it reaches the Mehi River, Tycannah Creek descends 312 metres (1,024 ft) over its 125 kilometres (78 mi) course; starting at an elevation of 506 metres (1,660 ft) and falls to be 194 metres (636 ft) when it joins the Mehi River.

Most of the land along Tycannah Creek is used for agriculture.

There have been many flooding events in Tycannah Creek. During February 2012, heavy rainfall in the upper catchment of Tycannah Creek lead to the evacuations of 12 people in the village of Terry Hie Hie. Flooding leading to evacuations also occurred in November 2011.
