= Bald Hill Creek (New South Wales) =

Watercourse in Australia

Coordinates: 38°44′S 145°58′E

The Bald Hill Creek, a watercourse that is part of the Barwon catchment of the Murray-Darling basin, is located in the Orana region of New South Wales, Australia.

The Bald Hill Creek descends 196 metres (643 ft) over its 12.7 kilometres (7.9 mi) course. From its head waters to its joining to Tycannah Creek it falls from 574 metres (1,883 ft) above sea level to 377 metres (1,237 ft) above sea level.
