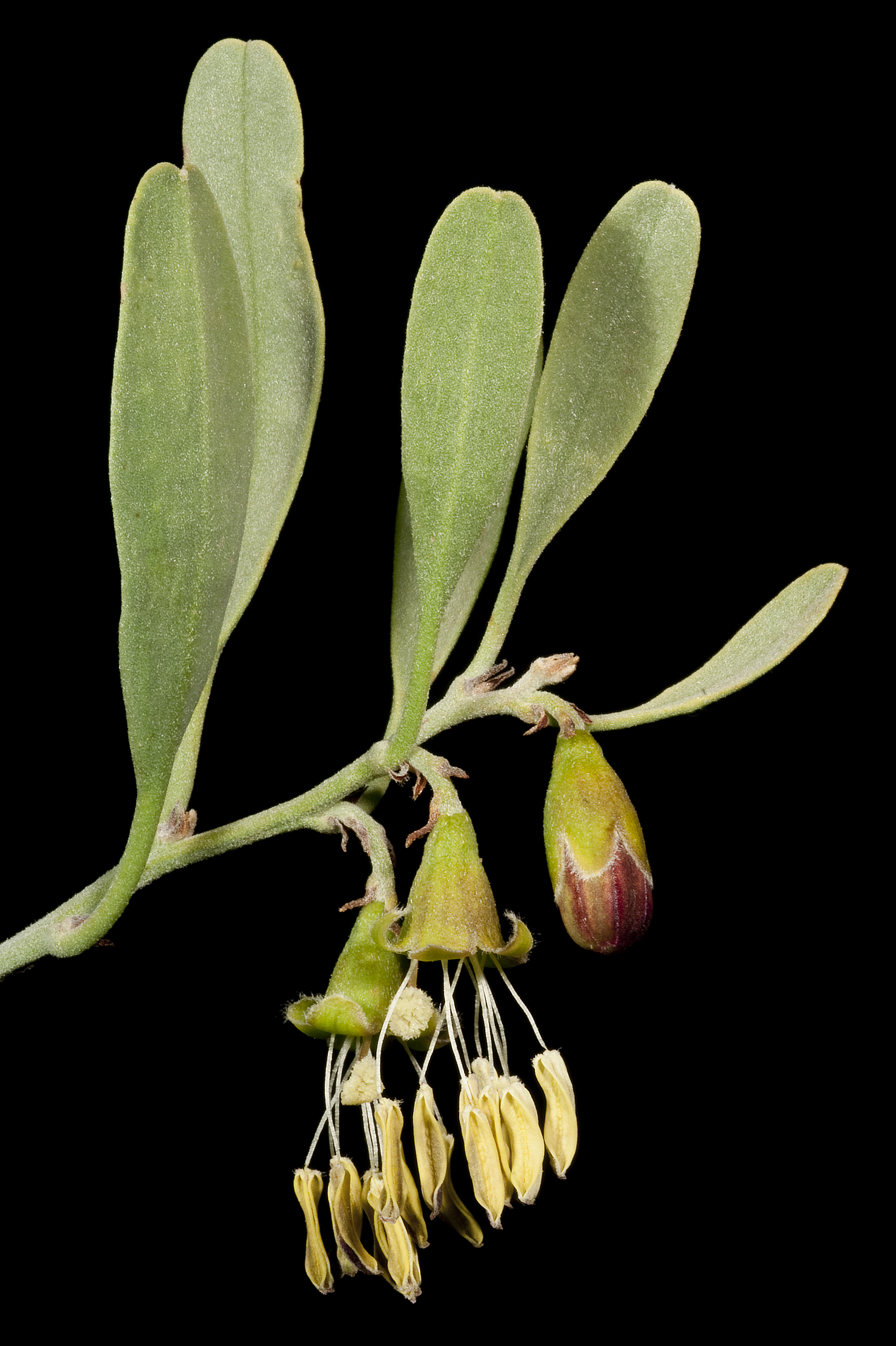

Scientific classification
- Kingdom: Plantae
- Clade: Tracheophytes
- Clade: Angiosperms
- Clade: Eudicots
- Clade: Rosids
- Order: Fabales
- Family: Surianaceae
- Genus: Stylobasium
- Species: S. spathulatum

Binomial name
- Stylobasium spathulatum Desf.

= Stylobasium spathulatum =

Species of shrub

Stylobasium spathulatum ("pebble bush") is a species of xerophytic shrub in the family Surianaceae. It was first described in 1819 by René Louiche Desfontaines and is endemic to the Northern Territory, Queensland, and Western Australia.

The specific epithet, spathulatum, is a Latin adjective (spathulatus,-a,-um) meaning "spoon-shaped" and refers to the shape of the leaves.

The Walmajarri people call this bush Kuparta.

== Gallery ==
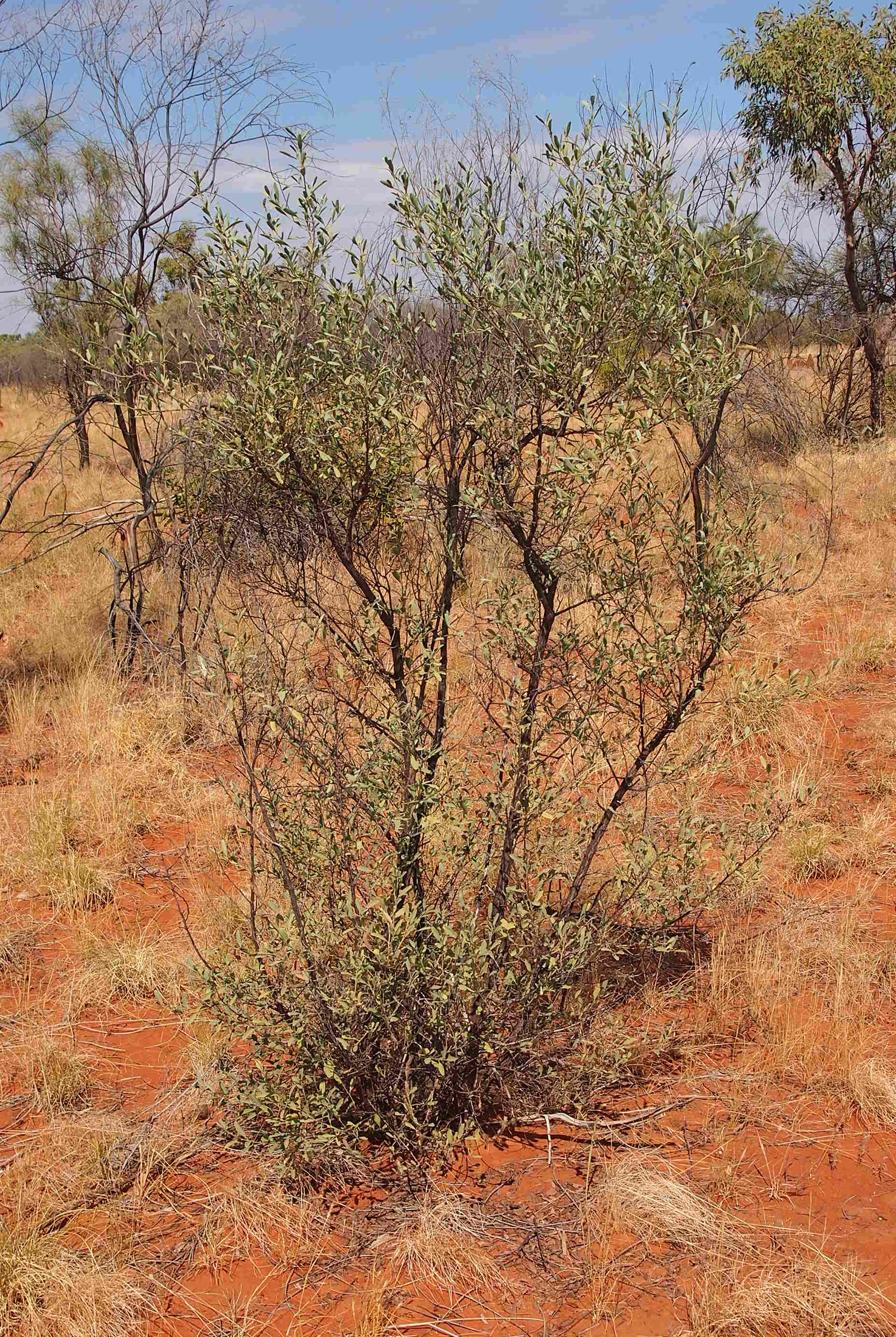

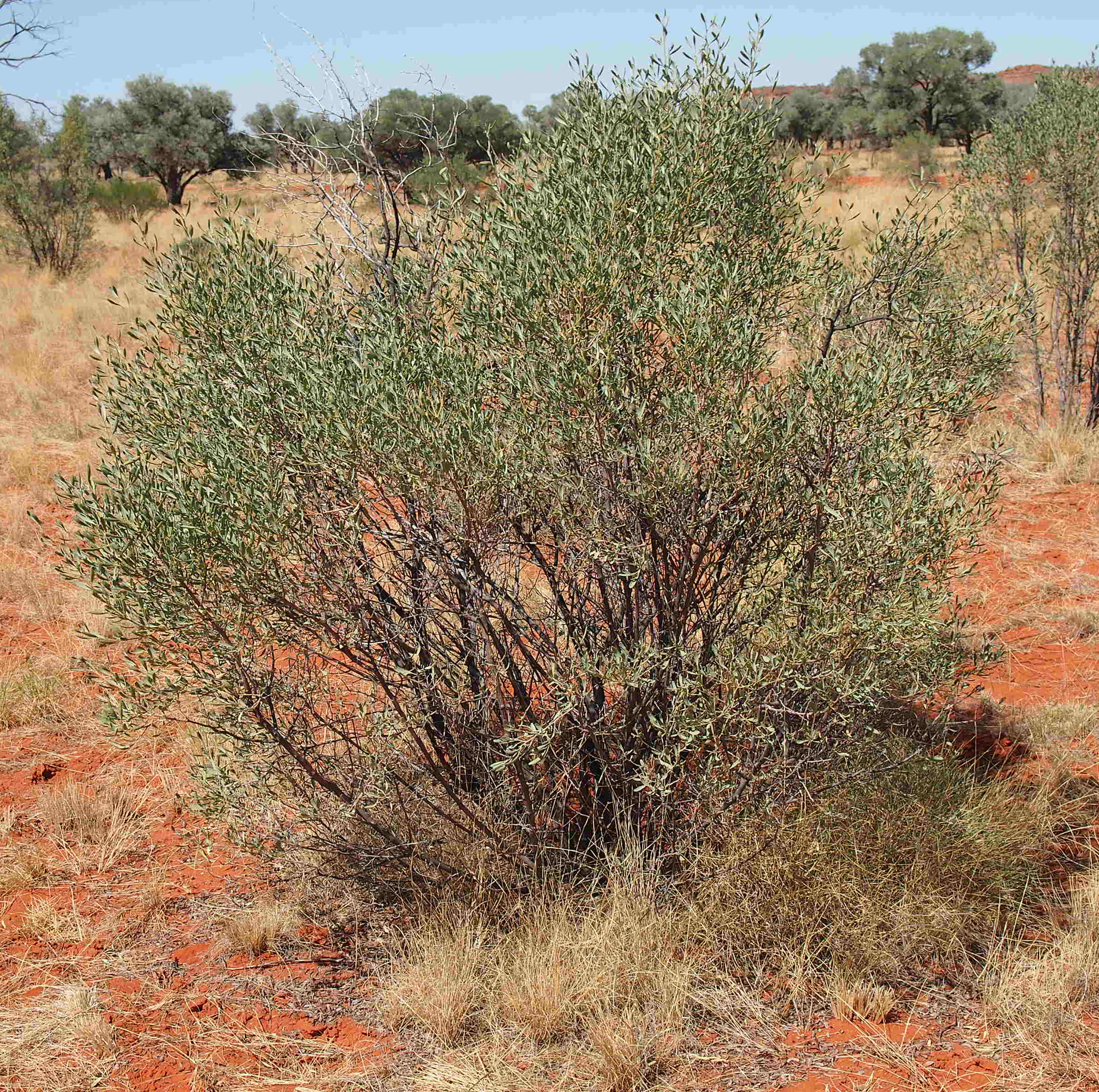

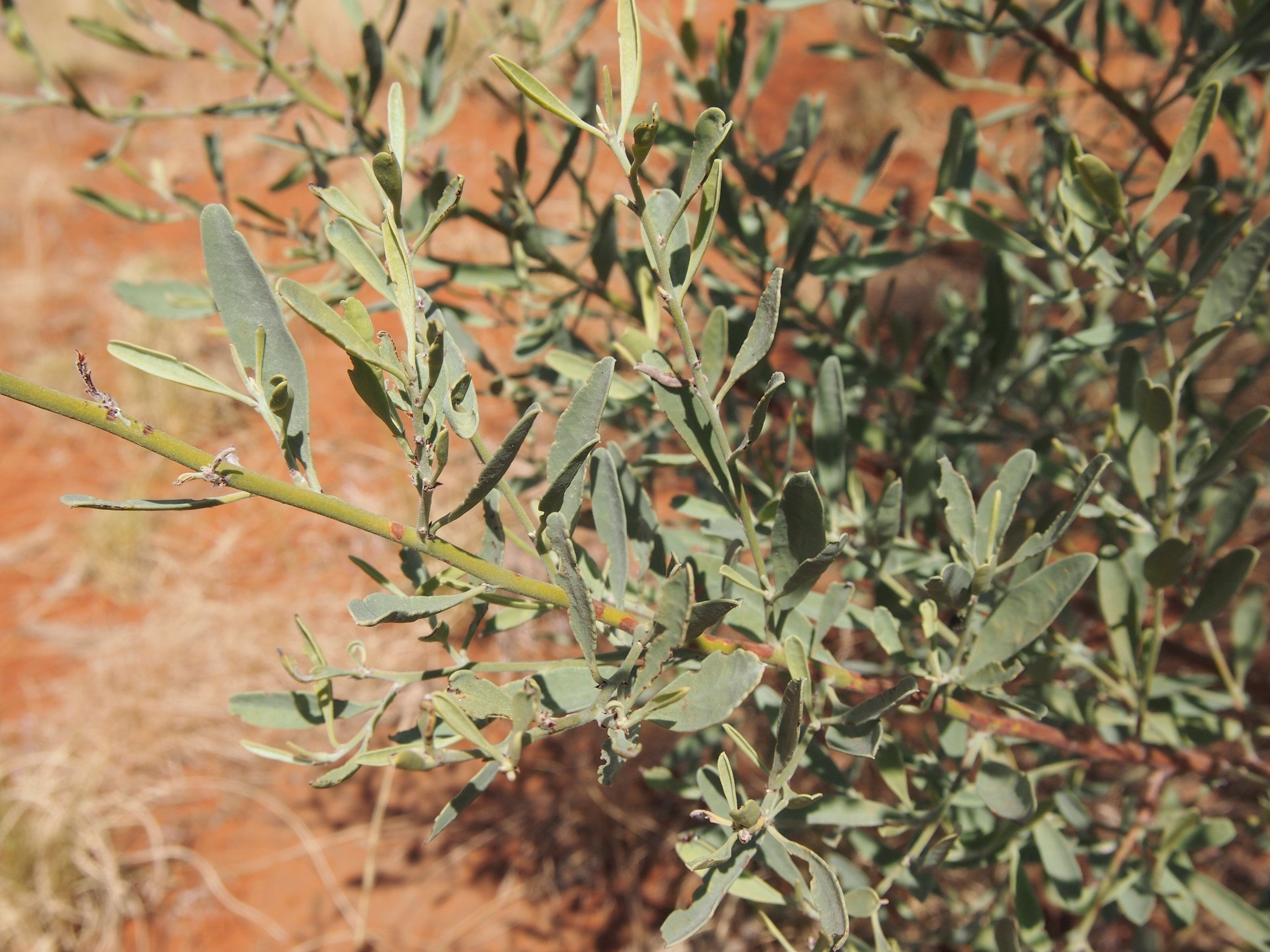

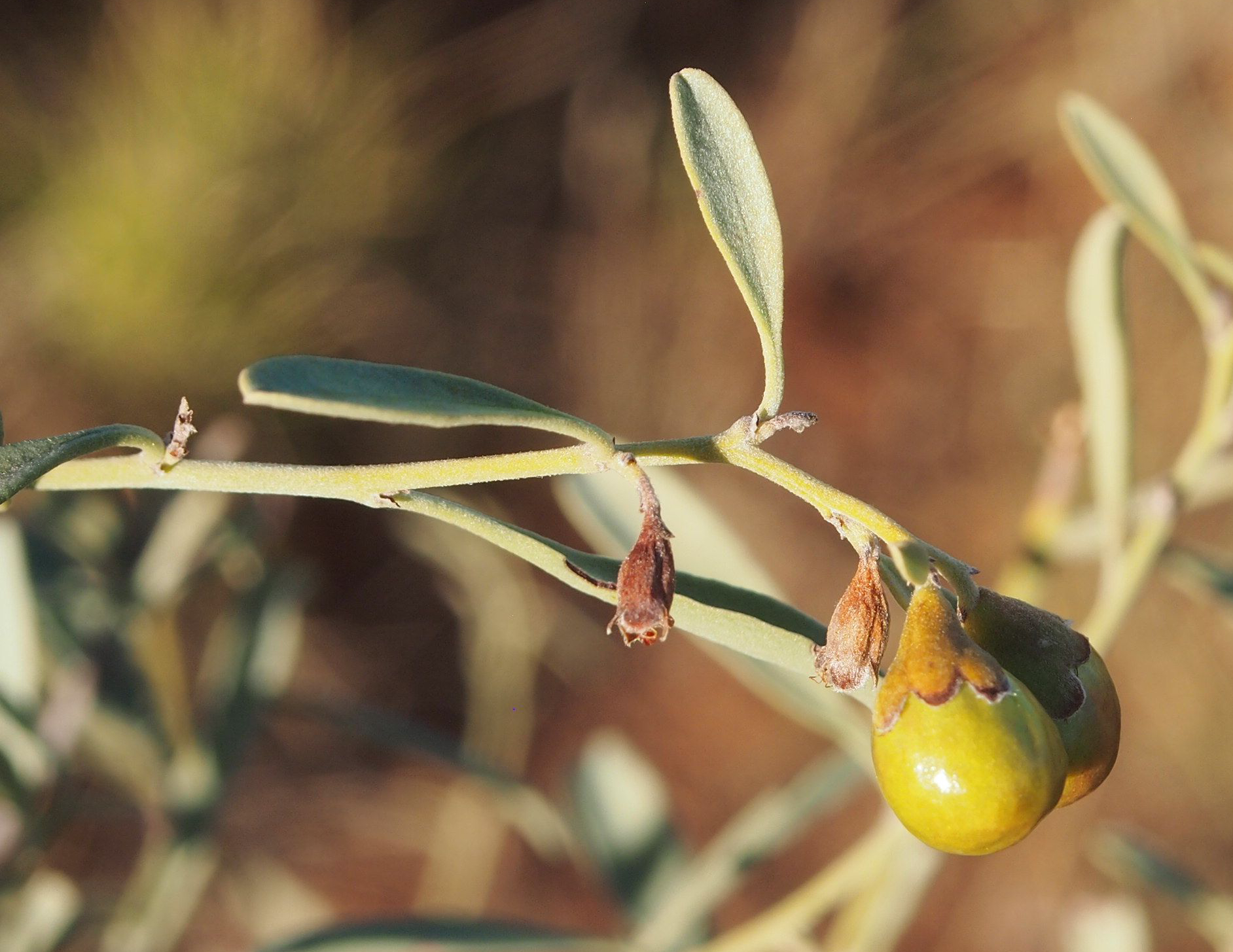
