= Recchia mexicana =

Scientific classification
- Kingdom: Plantae
- Clade: Tracheophytes
- Clade: Angiosperms
- Clade: Eudicots
- Clade: Rosids
- Order: Fabales
- Family: Surianaceae
- Genus: Recchia
- Species: R. mexicana

Binomial name
- Recchia mexicana Moc. & Sessé ex DC.

Synonyms
- Recchia bracteata (Planch.) Small; Rigiostachys bracteata Planch. Rigiostachys roureoides Loes. & Soler.

Species of tree

Recchia mexicana is a species of trees in the family Surianaceae. It is native to tropical habitats of Mexico.
