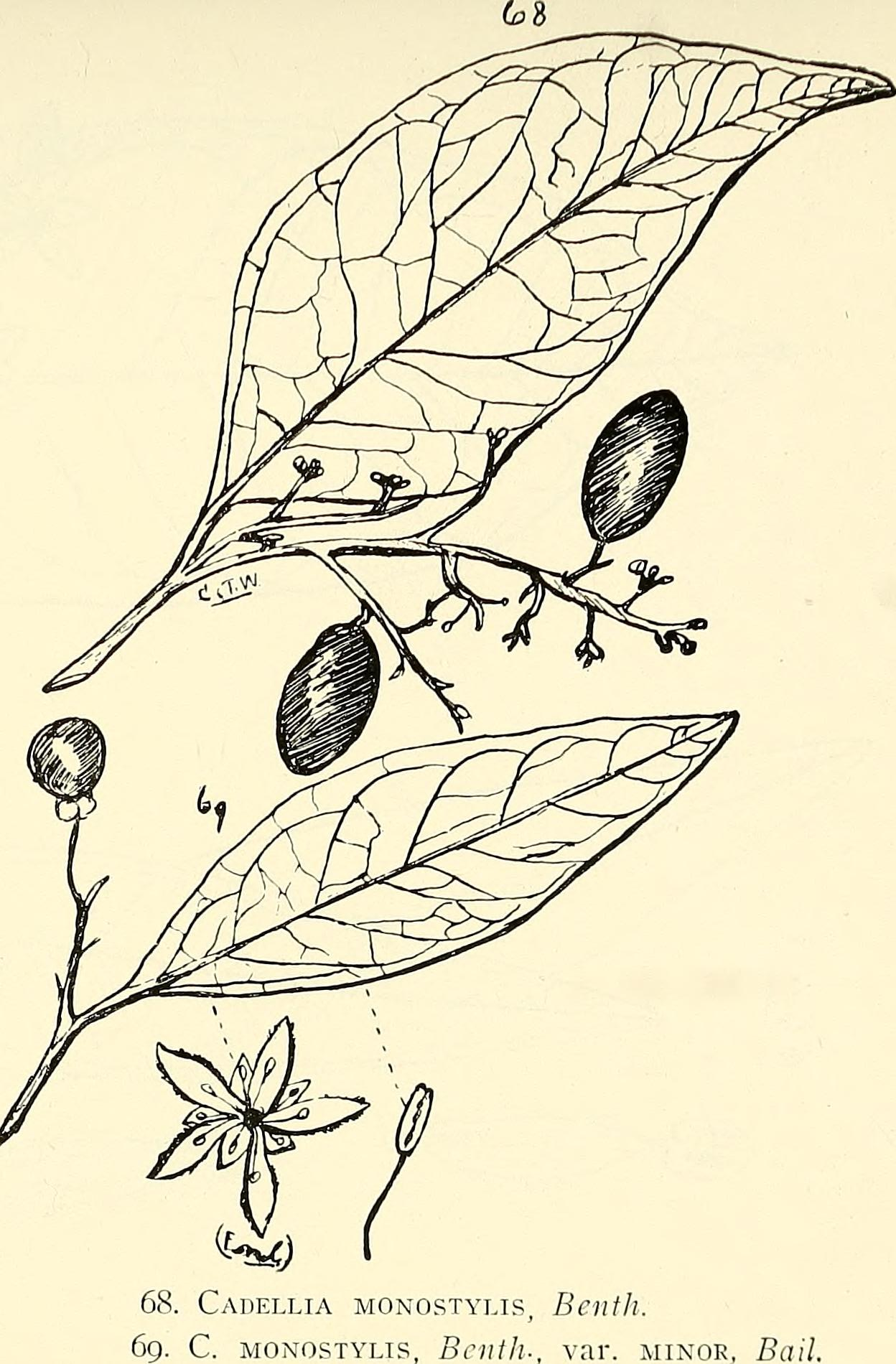
- Comprehensive catalogue of Queensland plants, both indigenous and naturalised. To which are added, where known, the aboriginal and other vernacular names; with numerous illustrations, and copious

Scientific classification
- Kingdom: Plantae
- Clade: Embryophytes
- Clade: Tracheophytes
- Clade: Spermatophytes
- Clade: Angiosperms
- Clade: Eudicots
- Clade: Rosids
- Order: Fabales
- Family: Surianaceae
- Genus: Guilfoylia; F.Muell.
- Species: G. monostylis

Binomial name
- Guilfoylia monostylis (Benth.) F.Muell.

Synonyms
- Cadellia monostylis Benth.; Cadellia monostylis var. minor F.M.Bailey

= Guilfoylia =

Genus of plants

Guilfoylia is a monotypic genus of flowering plants belonging to the family Surianaceae. The only species is Guilfoylia monostylis.

Its native range is eastern Australia, and found in the states of New South Wales and Queensland.

The genus name of Guilfoylia is in honour of William Guilfoyle (1840–1912), an Australian landscape gardener and botanist. The Latin specific epithet of monostylis is derived from mono meaning one and stylis referring to the style. It was first described and published in Fragm. (Fragmenta Phytographiae Australiae, Melbourne) Vol.8 on page 34 in 1873.
