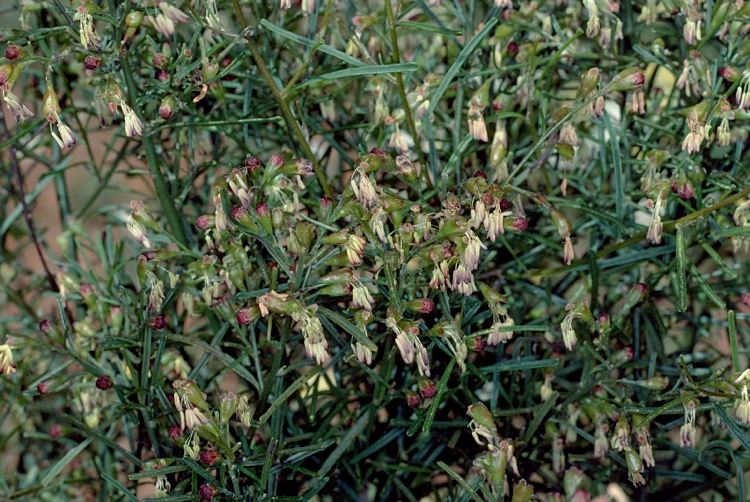

Scientific classification
- Kingdom: Plantae
- Clade: Tracheophytes
- Clade: Angiosperms
- Clade: Eudicots
- Clade: Rosids
- Order: Fabales
- Family: Surianaceae
- Genus: Stylobasium
- Species: S. australe

Binomial name
- Stylobasium australe (Hook.) Prance

Synonyms
- Macrostigma australe Hook. (1842)

= Stylobasium australe =

Species of plant

Stylobasium australe is a species of shrub endemic to Western Australia. It was first described as Macrostigma australe in 1842 by William Jackson Hooker, and reassessed in 1965 as Stylobasium by Ghillean Prance.

== Description ==
Stylobasium australe is a perennial shrub that grows up to 2m high. It has simple leaves with entire margins and flowers from May to October. The flowers are dichogamous, with the male stamens developing first and dehiscing before the female stigma develops (protandry). New plants can grow from root suckers.
