= Gamilaroi Nature Reserve =

Protected area in New South Wales, Australia

- IUCN category IV (habitat/species management area)
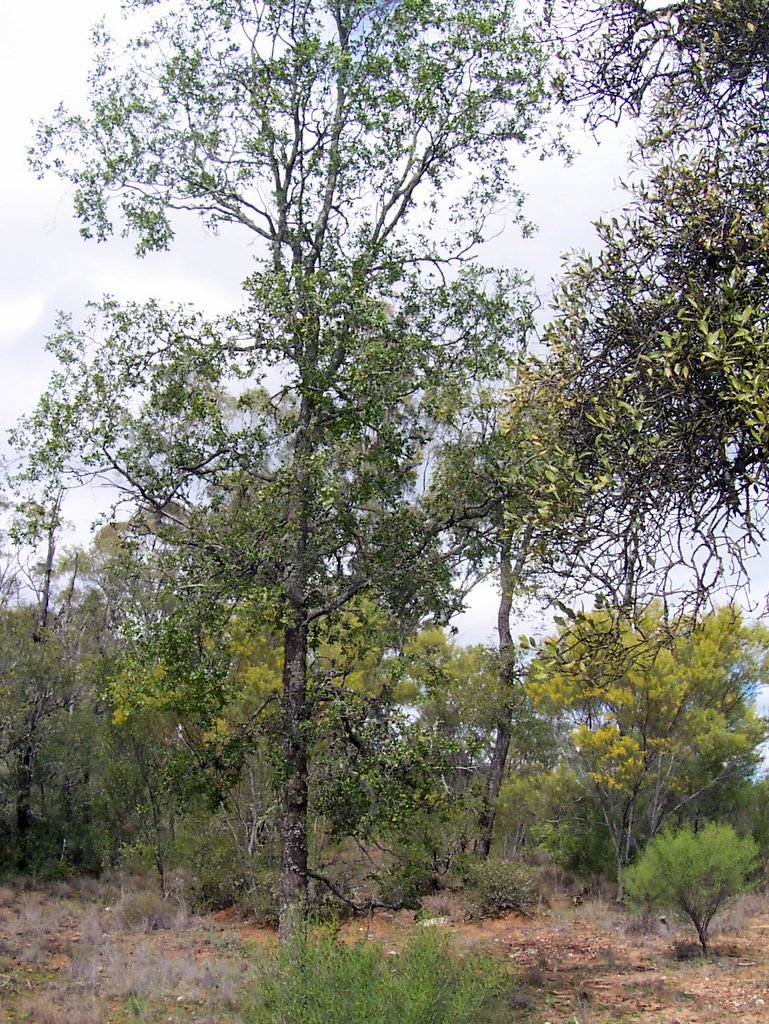
- Ooline

- Location within New South Wales
- Location: New South Wales
- Nearest city: Moree
- Coordinates: 29°50′50″S 150°09′50″E
- Area: 1.13 km^{2} (0.44 sq mi)
- Established: May 1994
- Governing body: NSW National Parks and Wildlife Service
- Website: Official website

The Gamilaroi Nature Reserve is a protected nature reserve, part of the southern Brigalow Belt, in the North West Slopes region of New South Wales, in eastern Australia. The 113-hectare (280-acre) reserve is situated 48 kilometres (30 mi) southeast of Moree, and about 6 kilometres (3.7 mi) south of Terry Hie Hie, at an elevation of 340 metres (1,120 ft) above sea level. The reserve is one of seven sites in the state where ooline occurs naturally. For this reason, the reserve is not promoted for recreation; and visits are not encouraged.

== Etymology ==
The name Gamilaroi is a name for the local Kamilaroi, the Indigenous people of the area.

== Features ==
The primary objective of the reserve is the conservation of the rare ooline. Other interesting plant species occurring here are the wilga, white box, belah and mock olive. The shrub layer has affinities with coastal rainforests in the east. But other plants are usually seen in the drier western woodlands. Rainfall is around 600 millimetres (24 in) per year, soils are a sandy red clay, derived from a re-crystallised quartzite-ferruginous sandstone.

The rare grey-crowned babbler is recorded here. Animals recorded in the reserve include the eastern grey kangaroo, red-necked wallaby, swamp wallaby and the common dunnart. Threats to the reserve include clearing of vegetation, fire, weeds, genetic decline of the ooline, as well as damage and browsing by feral pigs and goats. The area was once part of a travelling stock route and was used for grazing.

== See also ==
- Protected areas of New South Wales
