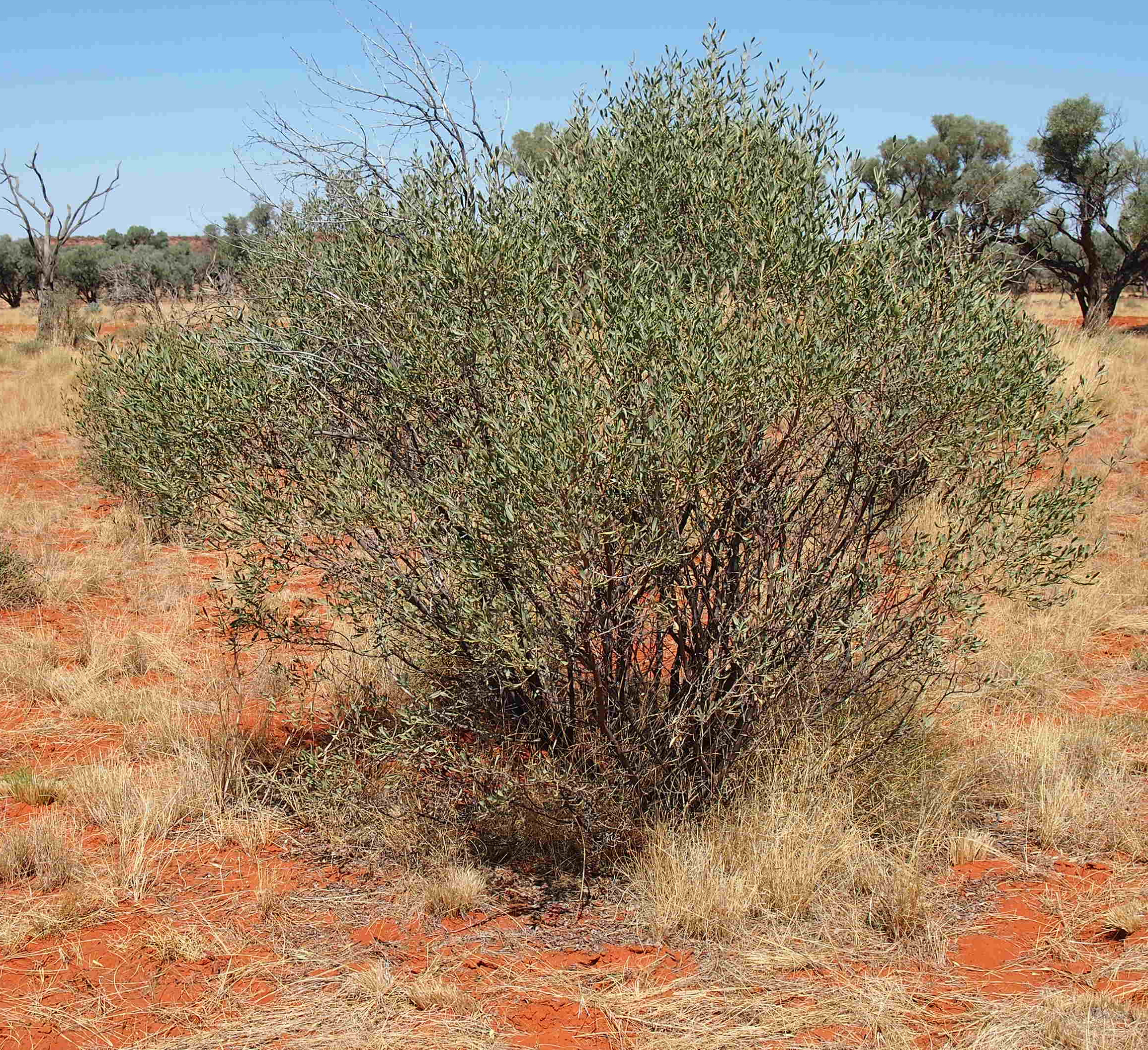

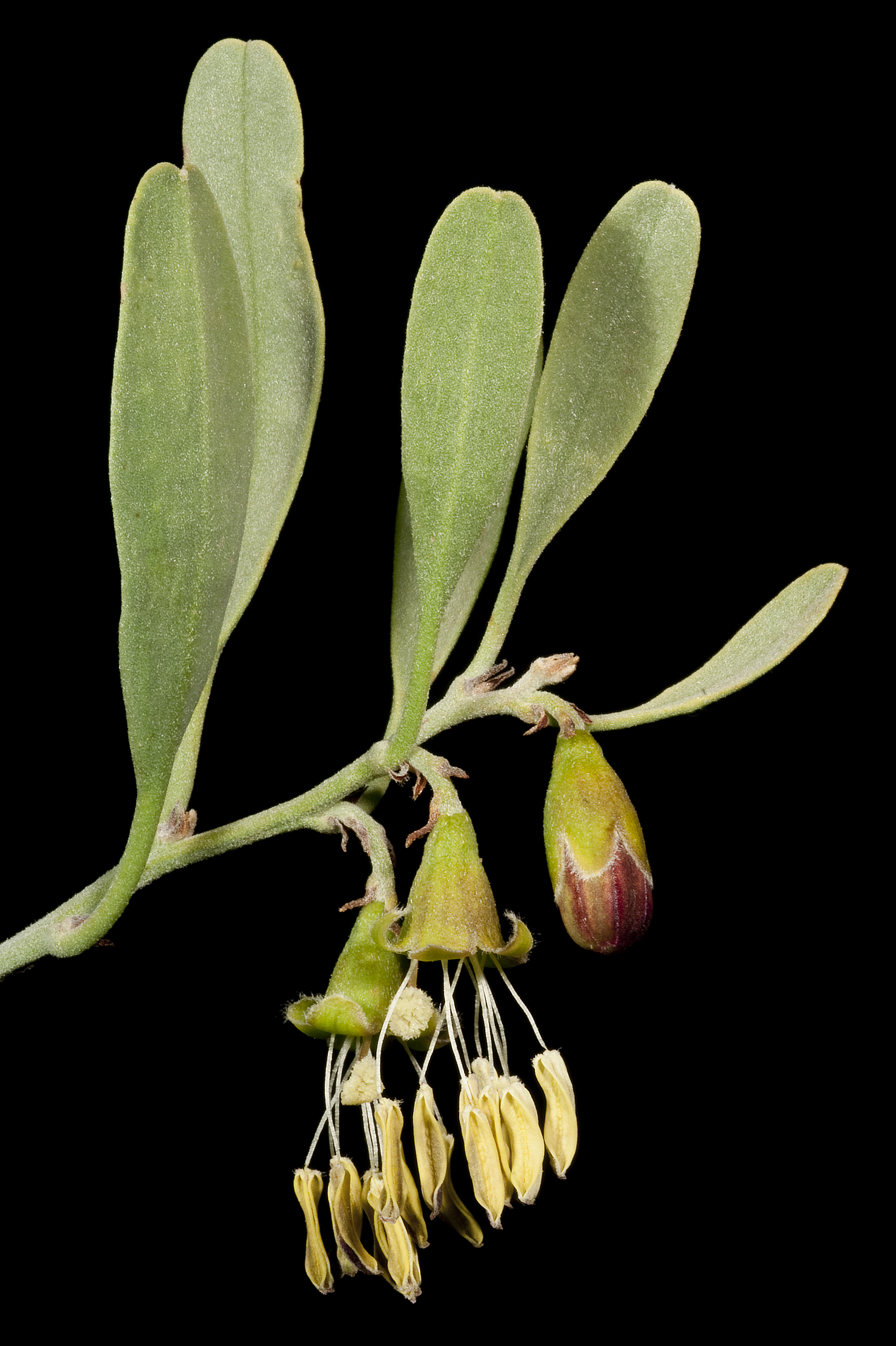
- Stylobasium spathulatum

Scientific classification
- Kingdom: Plantae
- Clade: Tracheophytes
- Clade: Angiosperms
- Clade: Eudicots
- Clade: Rosids
- Order: Fabales
- Family: Surianaceae
- Genus: Stylobasium; Desf.

= Stylobasium =

Family of shrubs

Stylobasium is a genus of xerophytic shrubs in the family Surianaceae. The genus is endemic to Australia, with species occurring in Western Australia, Northern Territory, and Queensland.

Species include:

- Stylobasium australe (Hook.) Prance
- Stylobasium spathulatum Desf. - Pebble bush
