= Crossing Creek =

River in New South Wales, Australia

Coordinates: 34°20′S 149°36′E

Crossing Creek is a creek in north-west New South Wales, Australia that flows into Tycannah Creek. It begins at an elevation of 480 m (1,570 ft) above sea level, and falls 141 m (463 ft) to 338 m (1,109 ft) above sea level along its 14.3 km (8.9 mi) length.
