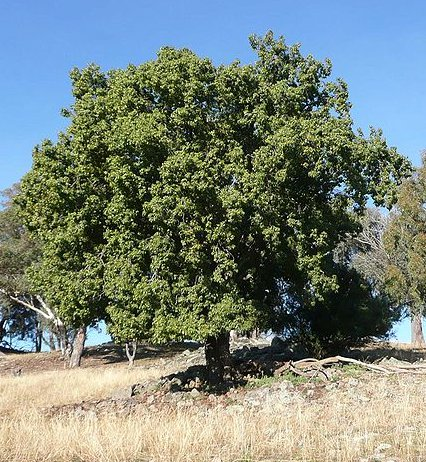
- A large specimen, near Jingellic, NSW, Australia

Scientific classification
- Kingdom: Plantae
- Clade: Tracheophytes
- Clade: Angiosperms
- Clade: Eudicots
- Clade: Rosids
- Order: Malvales
- Family: Malvaceae
- Genus: Brachychiton
- Species: B. populneus

Binomial name
- Brachychiton populneus (Schott & Endl.) R.Br.

= Brachychiton populneus =

Kurrajong

Species of tree

Brachychiton populneus, commonly known as the kurrajong, is a small to medium-sized tree found naturally in Australia in a diversity of habitats from wetter coastal districts to semi-arid interiors of Victoria, New South Wales and Queensland. Carrejun and carrejan were the indigenous names of trees in the foothills of the Blue Mountains near Sydney, and the bark was used for twine and fishing lines.

== Description ==
The tree is drought-tolerant and the extended trunk is a water storage device for survival in a warm, dry climate. The bell-shaped flowers vary in colour from pale cream to pink, while the leaves vary considerably in shape. The leaves are either simple and pointed, or may be 3–9 lobed. Saplings grow from a drought and fire-resistant tap-rooted tuber.

At present, there are two noted subspecies of Brachychiton populneus.

These are:

• Brachychiton populneus subsp. populneus

• Brachychiton populneus subsp. trilobus

== Uses ==
The kurrajong has multiple uses and was used by many Australian Aboriginal clans and tribes around Australia. As bush food or "bush tucker", the seeds located in a seed pod were often removed, cleaned of the irritating fine hairs within the seed pod, and roasted for eating. Water could be obtained from the tree roots by boring a hole in the trunk and squeezing the wood. There are also records of the seed pods being turned into a children's rattle or toy. The soft, spongy wood was used for making shields, and the bark as a fibre. The leaves are also used as emergency fodder for drought-affected animal stock. There are records of European settlers using the seeds as a coffee supplement by roasting and crushing the seeds.

== Adaptation ==
It has been introduced as an ornamental tree to south-western Australia, South Africa, Louisiana, California, Arizona and Mediterranean countries. In Western Australia it was observed to be invasive in disturbed areas.

== Hybrids ==
Horticulturists have hybridised the kurrajong with related Brachychiton species, including the Queensland bottle tree (B. rupestris) and Illawarra flame tree (B. acerifolius) to produce new garden ornamentals.

== Name ==
The specific name populneus pertains to a perceived similarity to the Populus genus, i.e. the poplars. Sometimes B. populneus is also known by the names "lacebark kurrajong" and "bottle tree" (USA). However, B. discolor is also referred to as the lacebark kurrajong, and bottle tree is a term commonly applied not only to other species of Brachychiton but to members of other genera around the world. The kurrajong has been recorded as a host plant for the mistletoe species Dendrophthoe glabrescens a hemi-parasite.

== Gallery ==
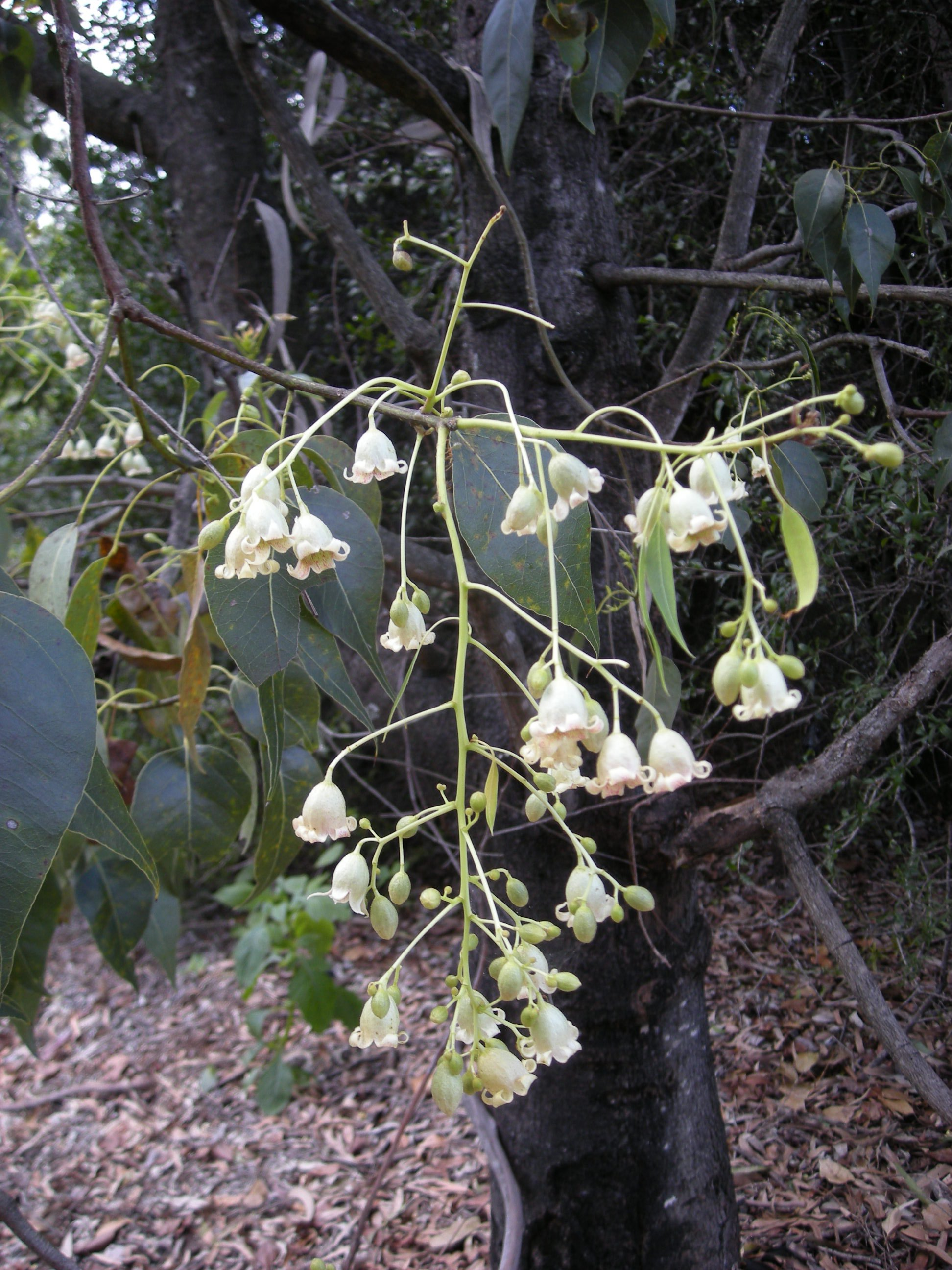
B. populneus flowers and leaves.

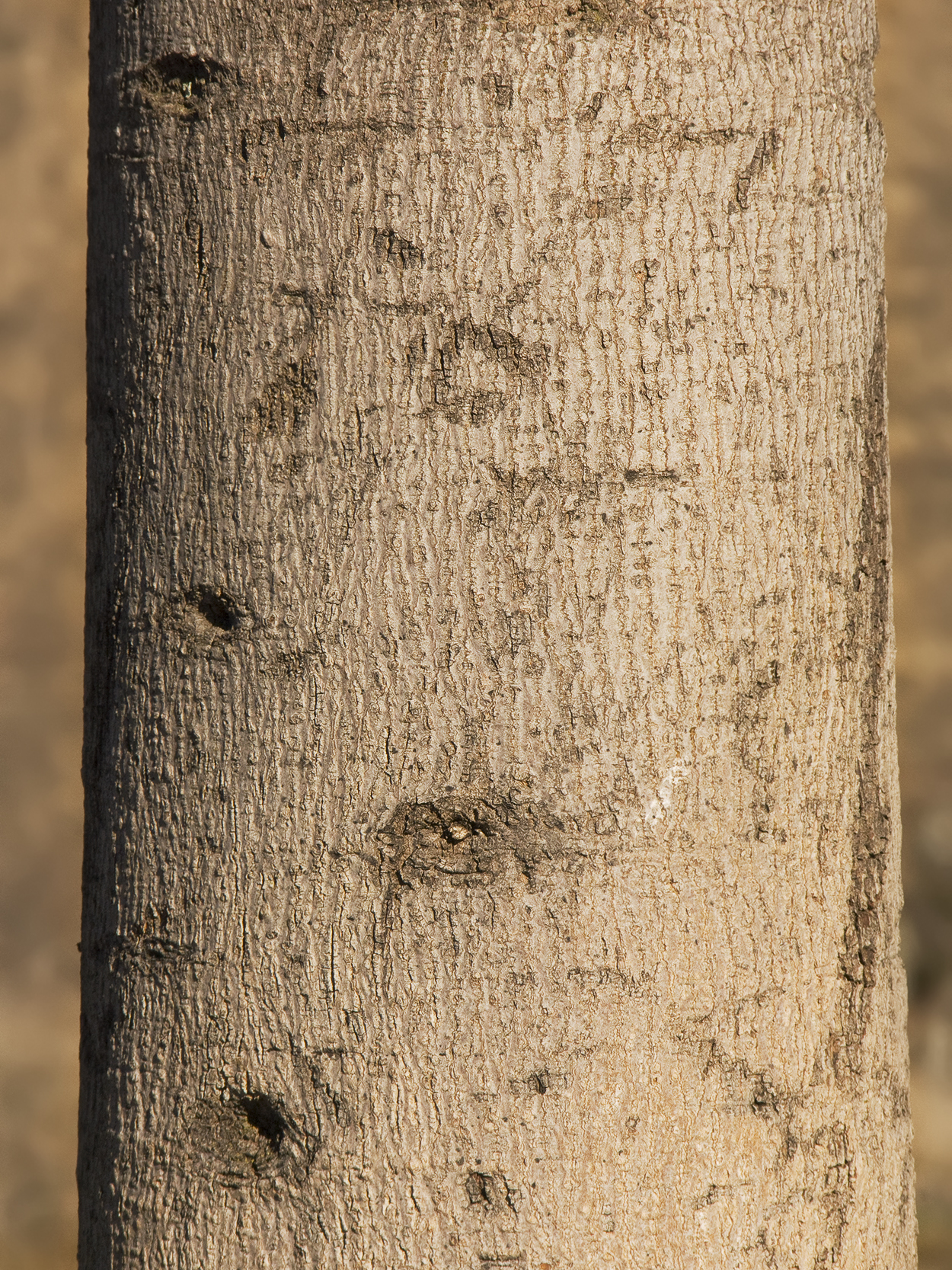
Bark detail on trunk.

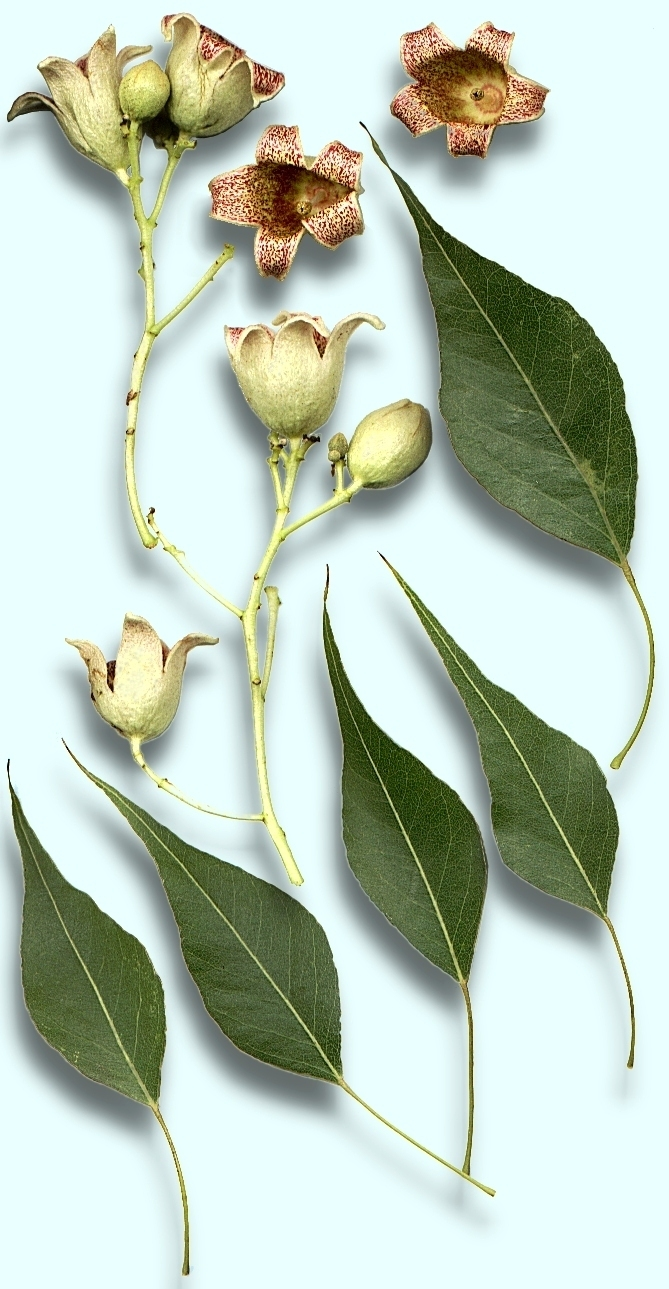
Flowers and leaves.

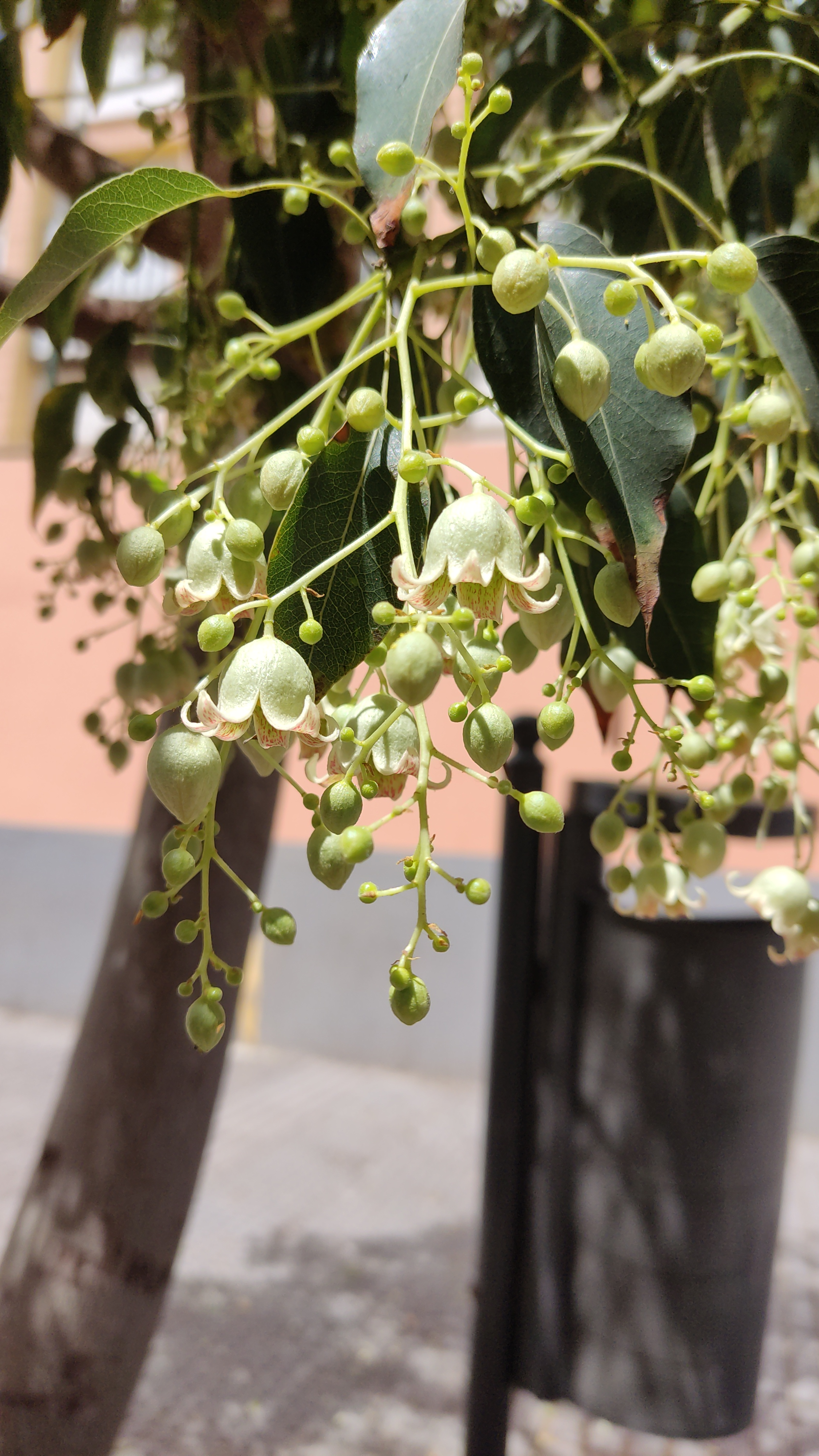
Kurrajong flowers in Gran Canaria

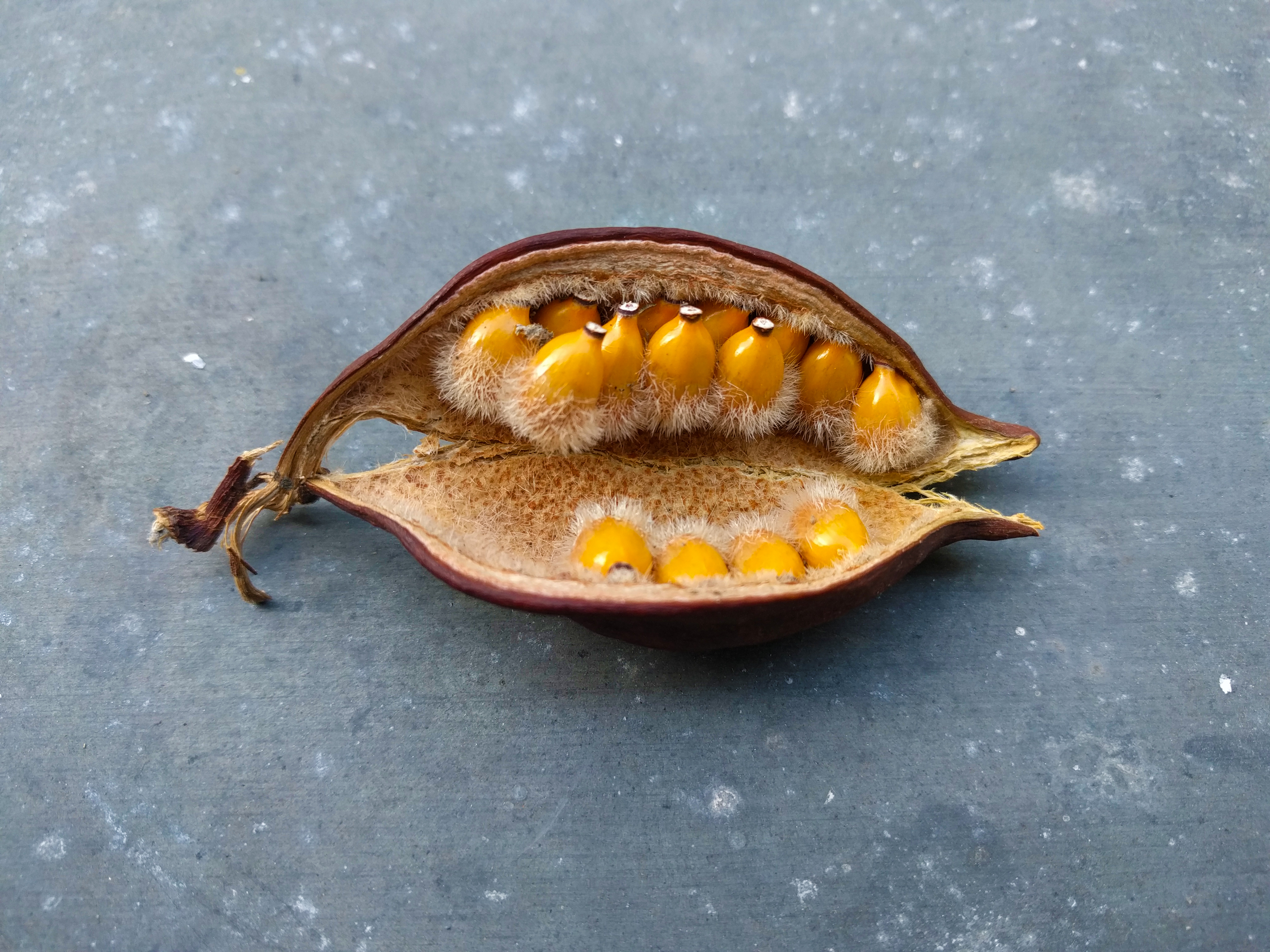
Opened seed pod of B. populneus in Agadir, Morocco.

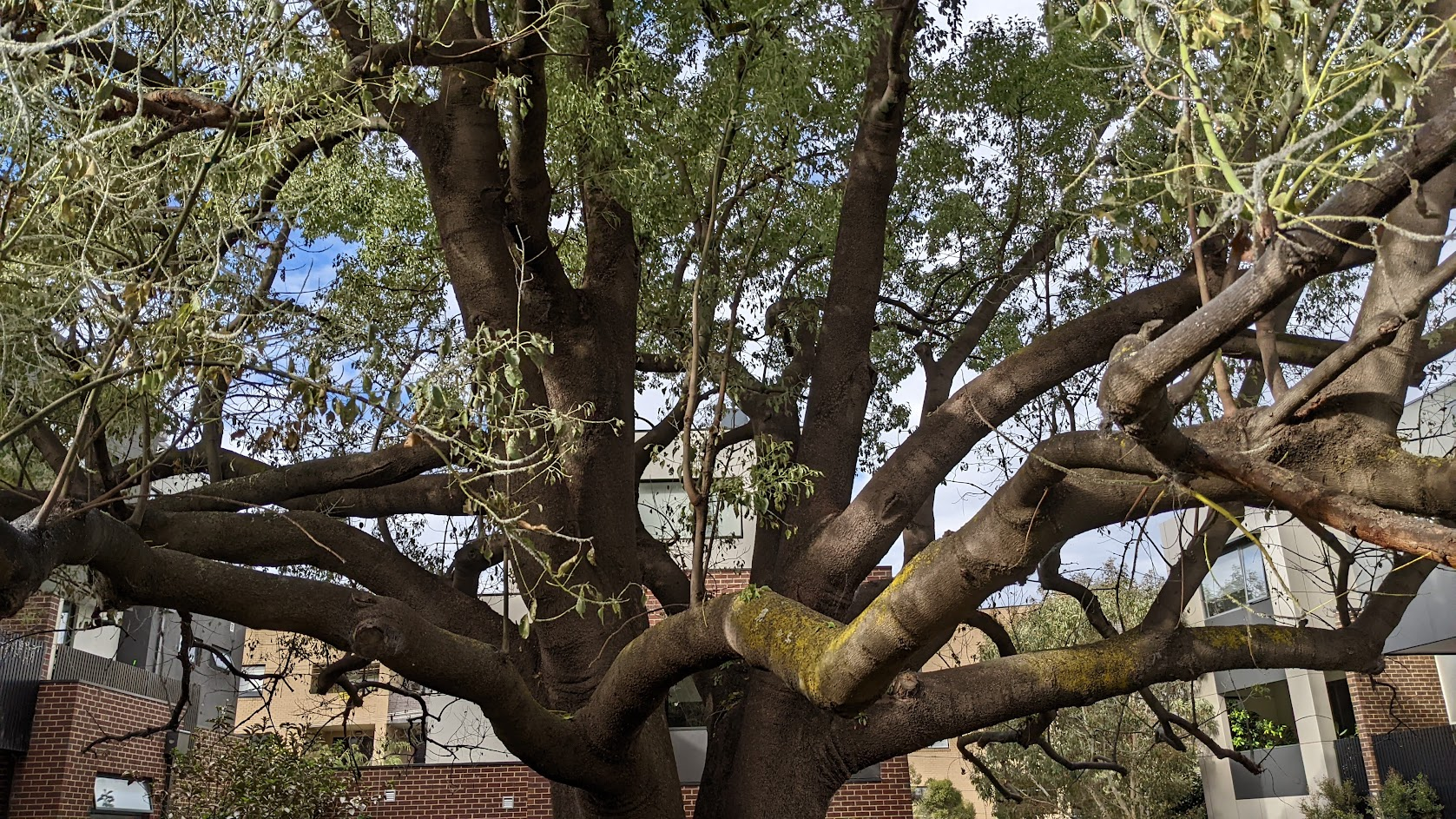
Planted in 1902, in Melbourne, Victoria.

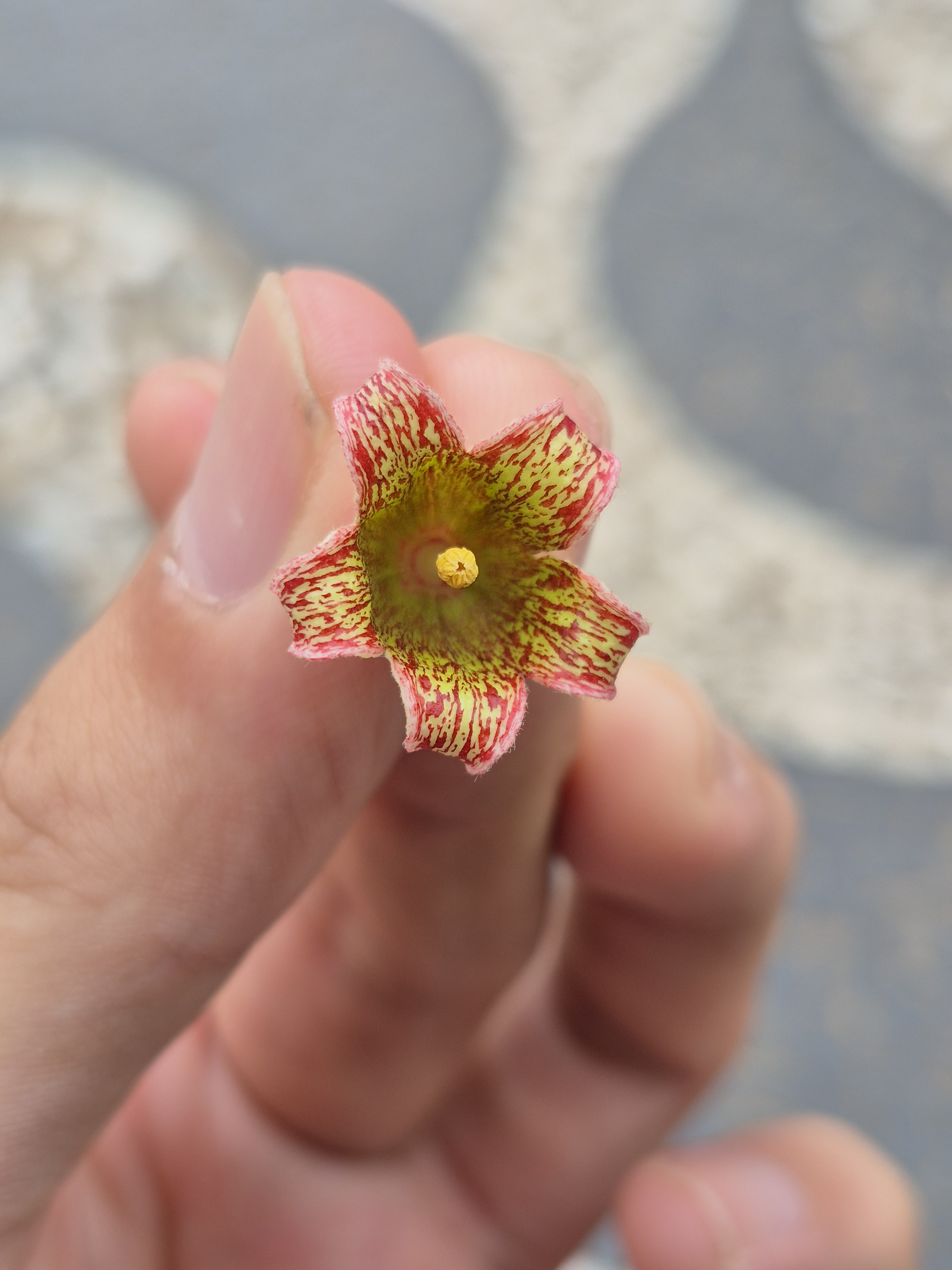
Flower in Brazil
