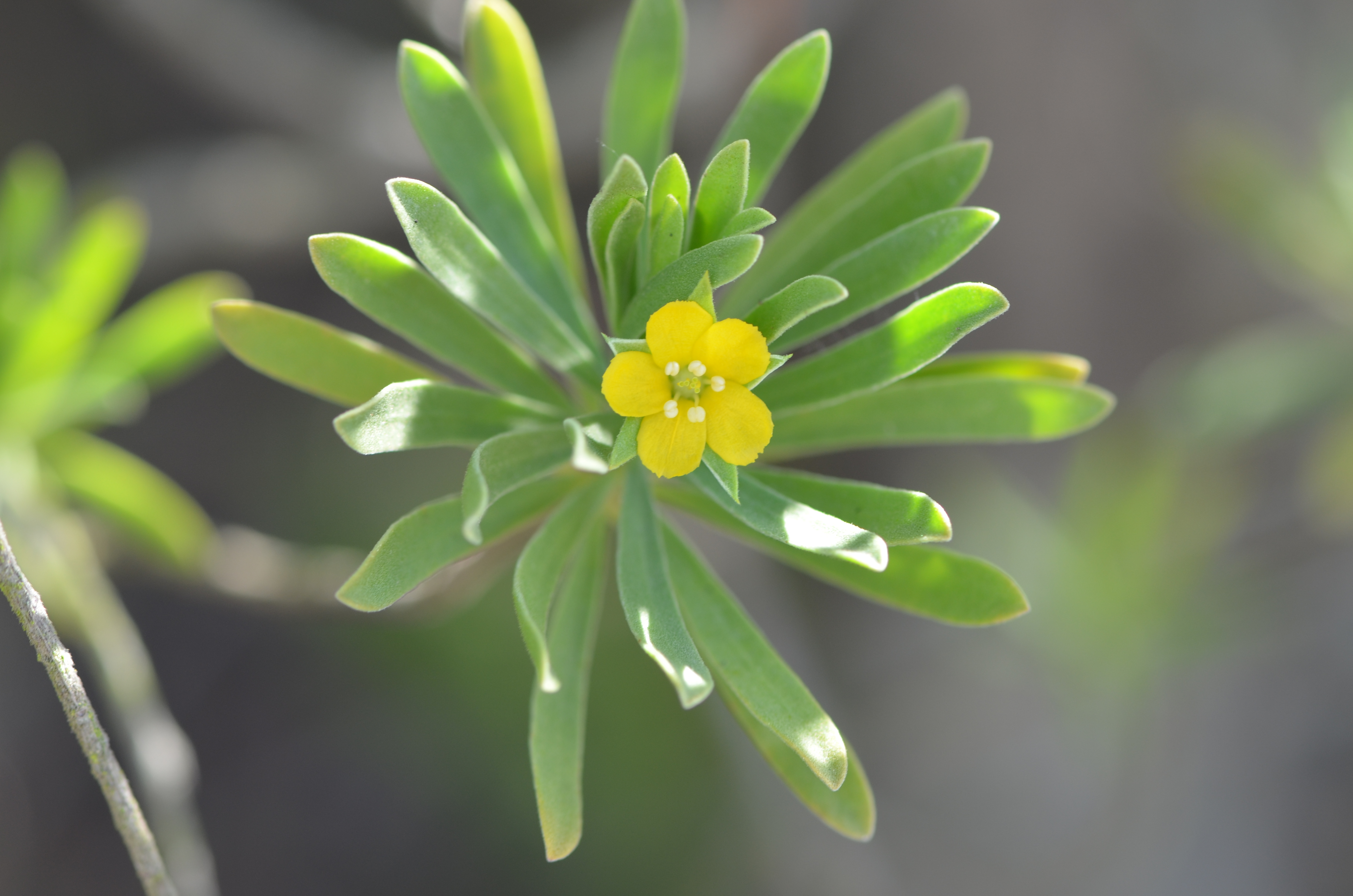
- S. maritima flower

Conservation status
- Least Concern (IUCN 3.1)

Scientific classification
- Kingdom: Plantae
- Clade: Tracheophytes
- Clade: Angiosperms
- Clade: Eudicots
- Clade: Rosids
- Order: Fabales
- Family: Surianaceae
- Genus: Suriana; Plum ex L. (1753)
- Species: S. maritima

Binomial name
- Suriana maritima L., 1753

Synonyms
- Bouzetia Montrouz. (1860); Suriania Post & Kuntze (1903); Bouzetia maritima Montrouz. (1860)

= Suriana =

Genus of flowering plants

Suriana is a monotypic genus of flowering plants containing only Suriana maritima, which is commonly known as bay cedar.

== Distribution ==
It has a pantropical distribution and can be found on coasts in the New and Old World tropics. Native to south Florida, the Caribbean, Central America, South America and in some parts of the Old World tropical zone.

== Description ==
Bay cedar is an evergreen shrub or small tree, usually reaching a height of 1–2 m (3.3–6.6 ft) and sometimes reaching 6 m (20 ft). The leaves are alternate, simple, 1–6 cm (0.39–2.36 in) long and 0.6 cm (0.24 in) wide. The grey-green, succulent foliage yields an aroma similar to that of cedar when crushed, hence the common name. Its yellow flowers are solitary or in short cymes among the leaves. Flowers have a diameter of 1.5 cm (0.59 in) when open, with petals 6–10 mm (0.24–0.39 in) long and sepals 7–10 mm (0.28–0.39 in) long. Bay cedar flowers throughout the year. After fertilisation, the flowers form clusters of five dry, hard drupes 3–4 mm (0.12–0.16 in) in diameter. The drupes are buoyant and can maintain the viability of the seeds during long periods in seawater, allowing the seeds to be dispersed by the ocean.

== Uses ==
Bay cedar is used for aromatic purposes and as hedges and landscaping.
