= Recchia =

Scientific classification
- Kingdom: Plantae
- Clade: Tracheophytes
- Clade: Angiosperms
- Clade: Eudicots
- Clade: Rosids
- Order: Fabales
- Family: Surianaceae
- Genus: Recchia; Moc. & Sessé ex DC.

Synonyms
- Rigiostachys Planch. 1847

Genus of trees

Recchia is a genus of trees in the family Surianaceae. It is native to tropical habitats of Mexico.

== Species ==
It includes the following species:

- Recchia connaroides — endemic to Oaxaca state in southwestern Mexico.
- Recchia mexicana — endemic to Colima, Jalisco, and Oaxaca states of southwestern Mexico.
- Recchia simplicifolia — endemic to Oaxaca and Veracruz states of southern Mexico.
