= Tregole National Park =

National park in Queensland, Australia

- IUCN category II (national park)
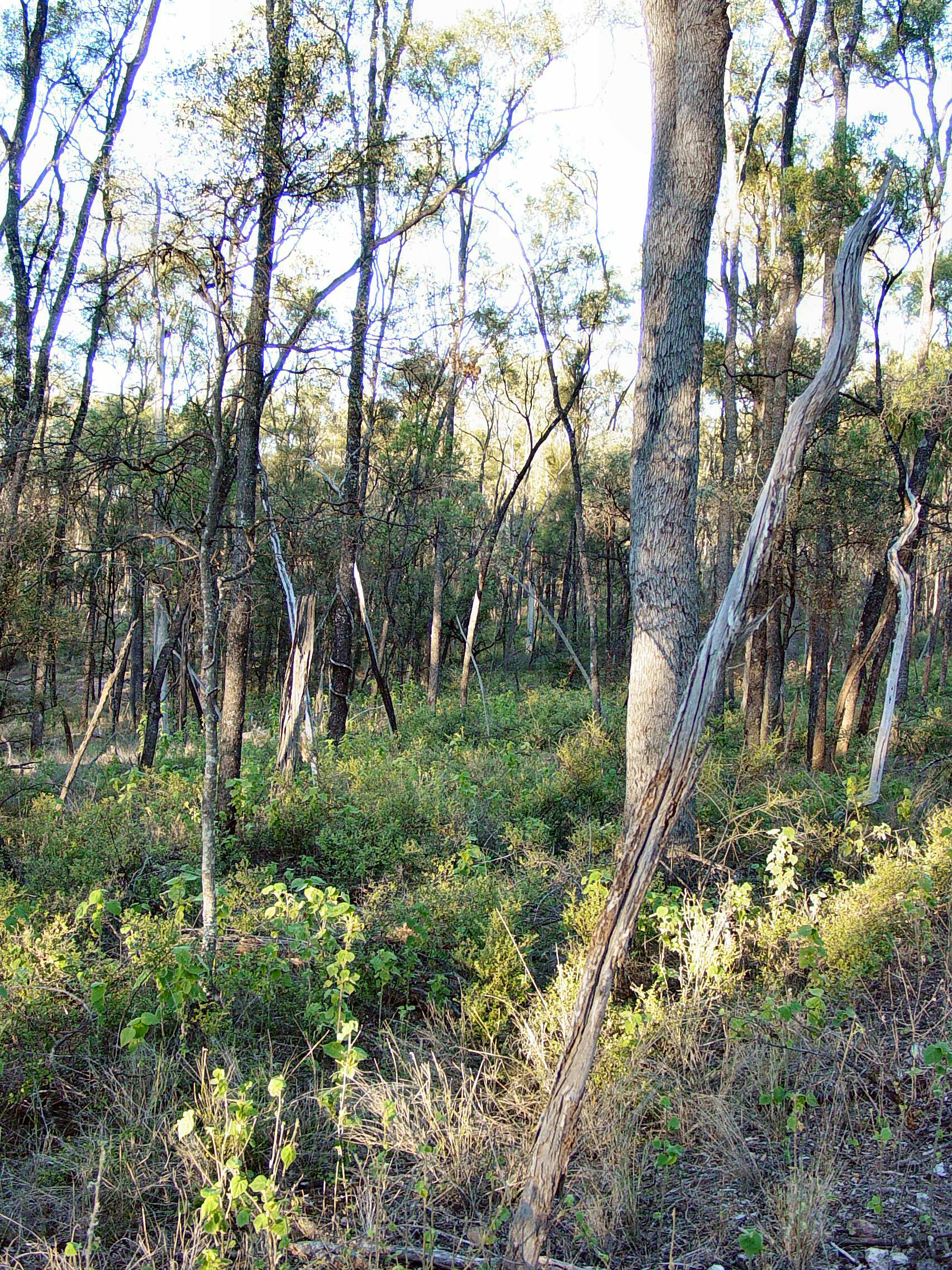
- Ooline Stand

- Location within Queensland
- Location: Queensland
- Coordinates: 26°29′23″S 147°04′03″E
- Area: 75.79 km^{2} (29.26 sq mi)
- Established: 1995
- Governing body: Queensland Parks and Wildlife Service

Tregole is a national park in South West Queensland, Australia, 603 km (375 mi) west of Brisbane. Until the gazetting of the park in 1975, the area was a grazing property. The park is located where the brigalow and mulga biospheres meet and has a representative sample of semi-arid ecosystems.

The park contains almost pure stands of the vulnerable ooline tree. The ooline stand in Tregole is unusual as the climate is hot and dry.

The park has no camping facilities. There is a day-use area 10 km (6.2 mi) south of Morven on the Morven–Bollon Road. The day-use area has a short (2.1 km, 1.3 mi) walk.

== See also ==
- Protected areas of Queensland
