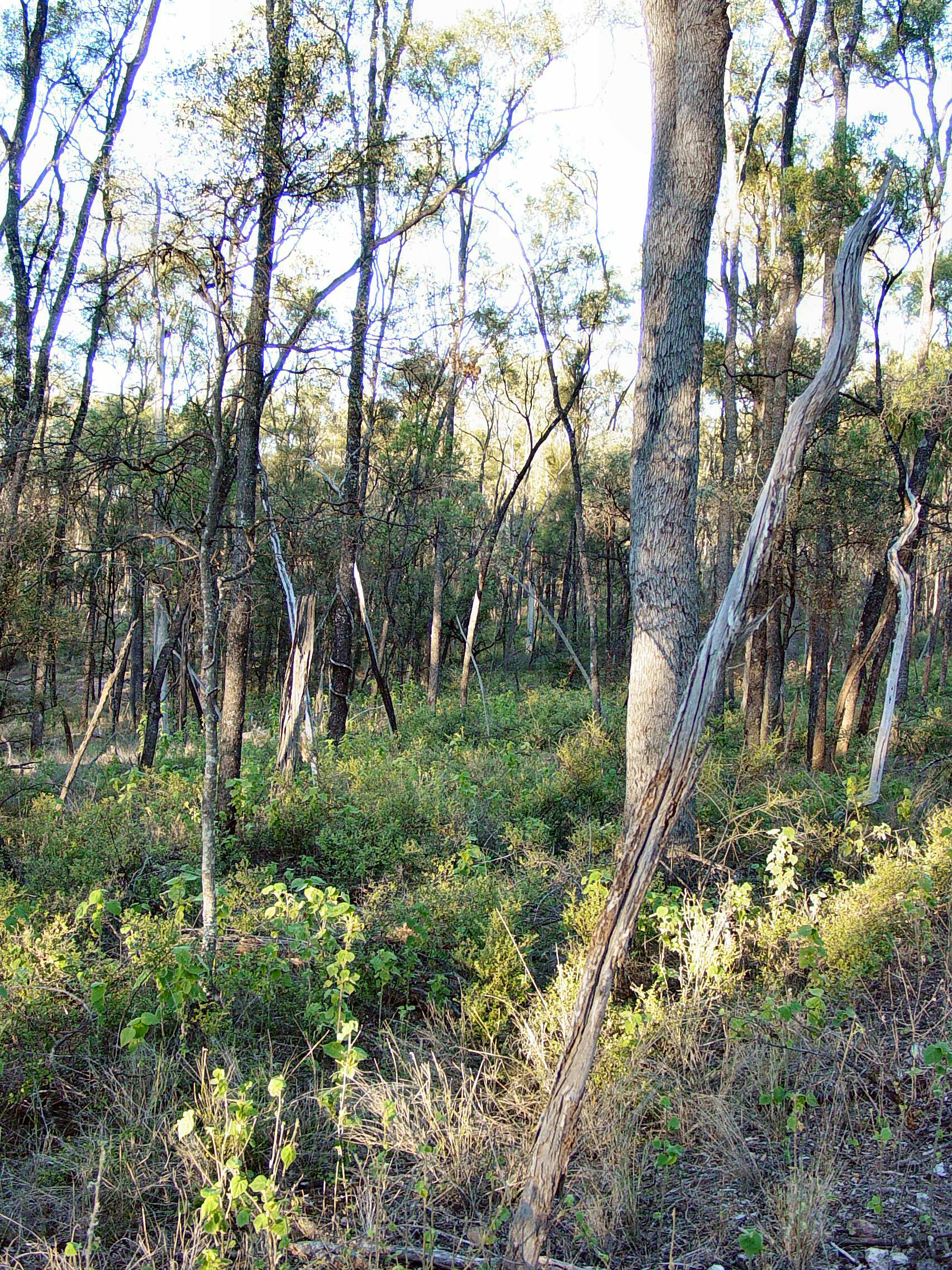
- Cadellia pentastylis

Scientific classification
- Kingdom: Plantae
- Clade: Tracheophytes
- Clade: Angiosperms
- Clade: Eudicots
- Clade: Rosids
- Order: Fabales
- Family: Surianaceae; Arn.

Type genus
- Suriana L. 1753

Genera
- Cadellia F. Muell. 1860; Guilfoylia F. Muell. 1873; Recchia Sessé & Moc. ex DC. 1818 [1817]; Stylobasium Desf. 1819; Suriana L. 1753

Synonyms
- Stylobasiaceae J. Agardh

= Surianaceae =

Family of plants

The Surianaceae are a family of plants in the order Fabales with five genera and eight known species. It has an unusual distribution: the genus Recchia is native to Mexico, and the sole member of Suriana, S. maritima, is a coastal plant with a pantropical distribution; and the remaining three genera are endemic to Australia.

They range in form from small shrubs to tall trees.

== Systematics ==
Modern molecular phylogenetics suggest the following relationships:

- - Polygalaceae (outgroup)
  - Surianaceae
    - - Recchia
      - Cadellia
    - - Suriana
      - - Guilfoylia
        - Stylobasium

=== Species ===
Image	Genus	Living species
	Recchia Moc. & Sessé ex DC.,1966	Recchia connaroides; Recchia mexicana; Recchia simplicifolia
	Cadellia F.Muell., 1861	Cadellia pentastylis, ooline
	Suriana L., 1753	Suriana maritima, bay cedar
	Guilfoylia F.Muell., 1873	Guilfoylia monostylis
	Stylobasium Desf. 1819	Stylobasium australe; Stylobasium spathulatum
