= Bowman Creek (New South Wales) =

River in Australia

Bowman Creek is a creek in north west New South Wales, Australia. Starting just below Cape And Bonnet Mountain, at an elevation of 400m and at coordinates 29.790414°S 150.269251°E, Bowman Creek loses 95m of elevation over its distance to when it merges with Tycannah Creek at 29.814304°S 150.168818°E. Bowman Creek is 9.12 km long.
