= Terry Hie Hie, New South Wales =

Terry Hie Hie New South Wales
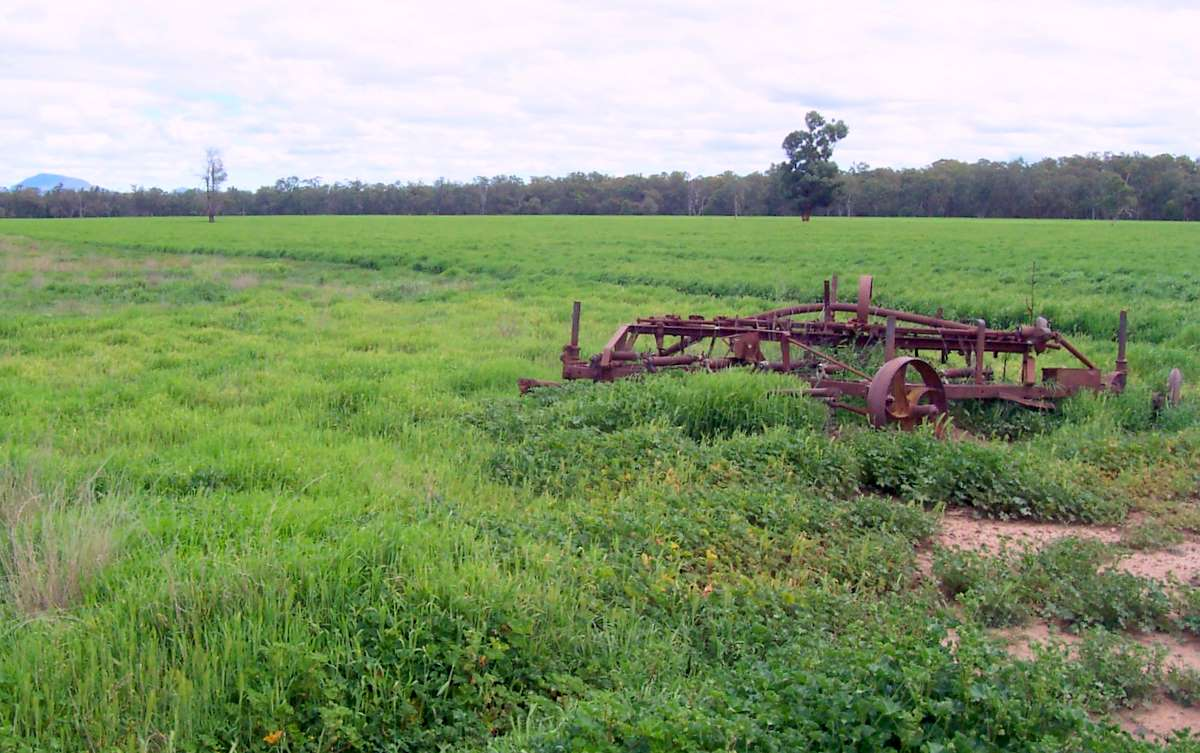
- Agricultural land at Terry Hie Hie

- Coordinates: 29°47′S 150°09′E
- Population: 76 (SAL 2021)
- Postcode(s): 2400
- Elevation: 266 m (873 ft)
- Location: 45 km (28 mi) SE of Moree; 600 km (373 mi) NW of Sydney; 100 km (62 mi) NE of Narrabri
- LGA(s): Moree Plains
- State electorate(s): Northern Tablelands
- Federal division(s): Parkes
Localities around Terry Hie Hie:
Moree	Biniguy	Gravesend
Gurley	Terry Hie Hie	Bangheet
Bellata	Berrigal	Elcombe

Terry Hie Hie is a very small farming town in the north of New South Wales, Australia within the Moree Plains Shire Council. Terry Hie Hie is south of the Gwydir Highway, east of the Newell Highway and 47 km south-east of Moree, the nearest large town.

Tycannah Creek also flows through the village of Terry Hie Hie. In times of flood, Tycannah Creek has been known to inundate some houses. This last happened during the November 2011 floods and the February 2012 floods. In February 2012 floods 12 people were ordered to evacuate from their homes during a large downpour in the Tycannah Creek catchment.

Local Aboriginal groups and conservationists were petitioning as recently as 2005 for a 160 square kilometre national park to be set aside and added to the schedule of Aboriginal ownership. The park would comprise seven existing State forests and one existing nature reserve. Logging ceased in the Mission State Forest during 2004. The area is seen as "the last big bit of bush that Aboriginal people can connect with in the Moree area".

== See also ==
- List of reduplicated Australian place names
