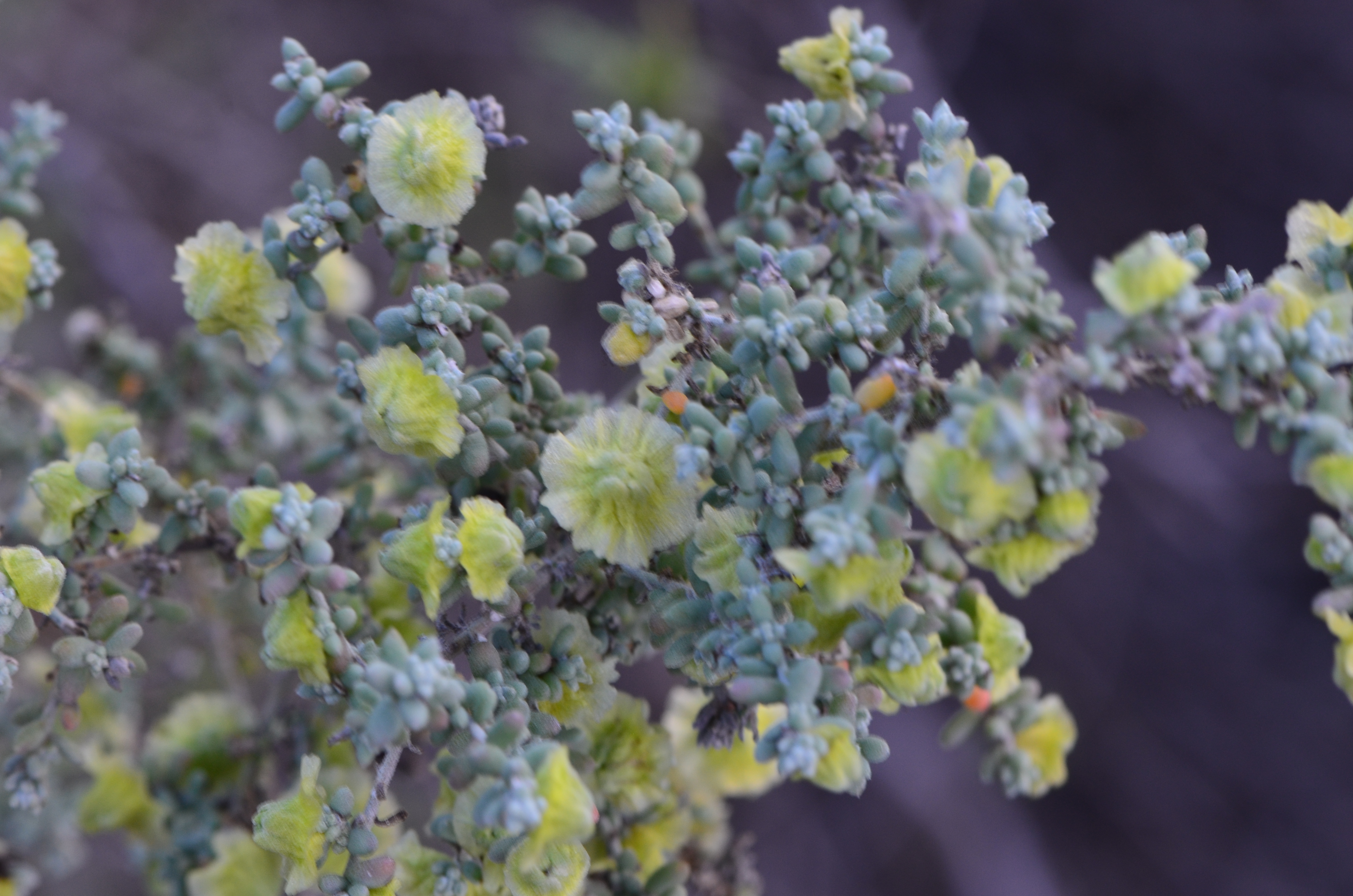

Conservation status
- Near Threatened (TPWCA)

Scientific classification
- Kingdom: Plantae
- Clade: Tracheophytes
- Clade: Angiosperms
- Clade: Eudicots
- Order: Caryophyllales
- Family: Amaranthaceae
- Genus: Maireana
- Species: M. pyramidata

Binomial name
- Maireana pyramidata (Benth.) Paul.G.Wilson
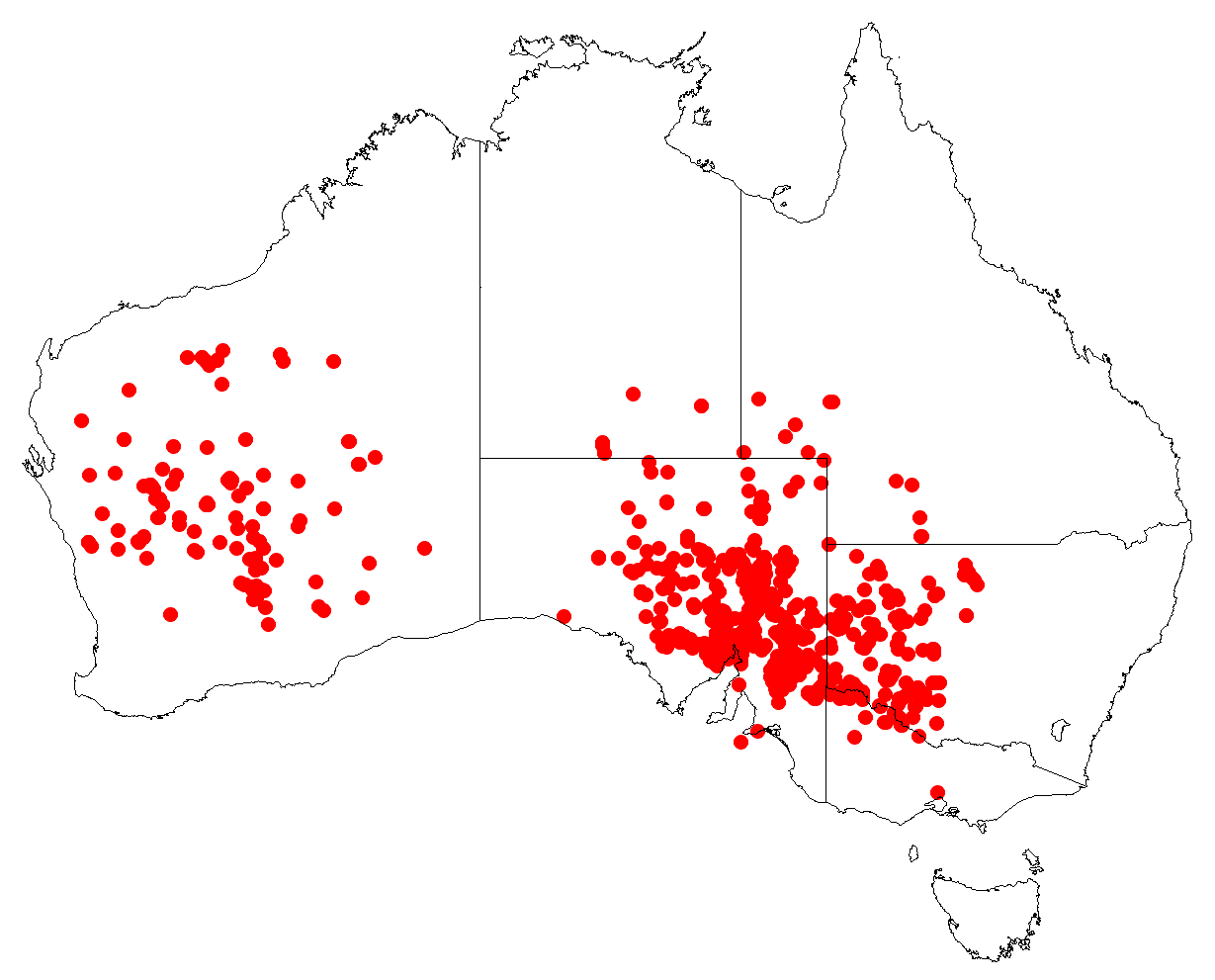
- Occurrence data for M. pyramidata from the AVH

Synonyms
- Kochia lobostoma F.Muell.; Kochia pyramidata Benth.; Kochia pyramidata var. lobostoma (F.Muell.) C.Moore; Kochia pyramidata Benth. var. pyramidata

= Maireana pyramidata =

Species of plant

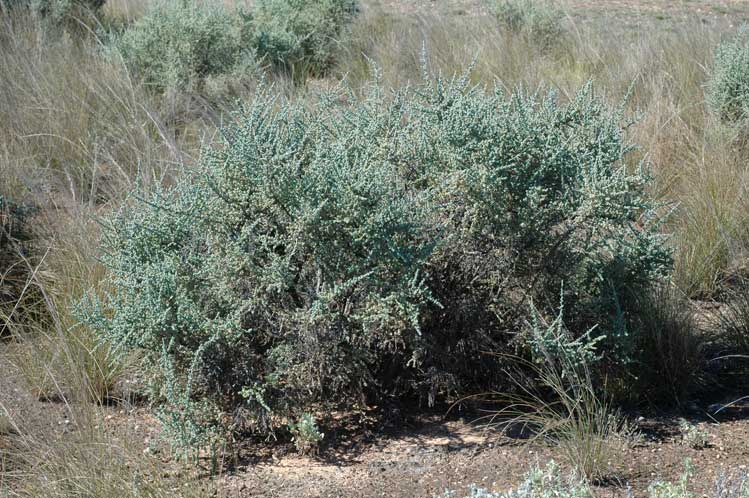
Habit near Balranald

Maireana pyramidata (sago bush, black bluebush, shrubby bluebush) is a species of flowering plant in family Amaranthaceae and is endemic to Australia, where it is found in all mainland states and the Northern Territory. It is a compact, dense, stiffly branched shrub with hairy, spreading leaves, mostly unisexual flowers and a pale brown to black fruiting perianth with a papery wing.

== Description ==
Maireana pyramidata is a compact, dense, stiffly branched shrub that typically grows to a height of 0.3–1.5 m (1 ft 0 in – 4 ft 11 in) and has woolly branchlets. Its leaves are arranged alternately, spreading, linear to narrowly lance-shaped, more or less terete, 2–6 mm (0.079–0.236 in) long and covered with fine, woolly hairs pressed against the surface. The flowers are mostly unisexual, (the plants frequently dioecious) and covered with woolly hairs. The fruiting perianth is pale brown to black when dry, the tube flat to top-shaped and thin-walled, the wing papery, horizontal and usually up to 12 mm (0.47 in) in diameter. The fruits mostly appear from August to November.

== Taxonomy and naming ==
This species was first formally described in 1870 by George Bentham who gave it the name Kochia pyramidata in his Flora Australiensis. The species was reassigned to the genus Maireana as M. pyramidata Wilson in 1975.

The specific epithet, pyramidata, refers to the pyramidal shape of the centre of the fruit.

== Distribution and habitat ==
Sago bush is widespread in drier areas of Australia, growing on calcareous soils, saline flats, salt lakes and on areas usually prone to flooding. In Victoria, it is found in the far north-west: Mildura, Red Cliffs, Culluleraine and the Kerang-Swan Hill district.

In Western Australia, it is found in the Avon Wheatbelt, Carnarvon, Coolgardie, Central Ranges, Gascoyne, Gibson Desert, Great Sandy Desert, Great Victoria Desert, Little Sandy Desert, Murchison, Nullarbor, Pilbara, and Yalgoo.

In South Australia it occurs in the Broken Hill Complex, Channel Country, Eyre Yorke Block, Finke, Flinders Lofty Block, Gawler, Great Victoria Desert, Murray Darling Depression, Riverina, Simpson Strzelecki Dunefields and Stony Plains bioregions.

Maireana pyramidata is found in the far south of the Northern Territory.

In New South Wales it is found in the Far West of the state.

== Conservation status ==
Maireana pyramidata is listed as "near threatened" under the Northern Territory Government Territory Parks and Wildlife Conservation Act.
