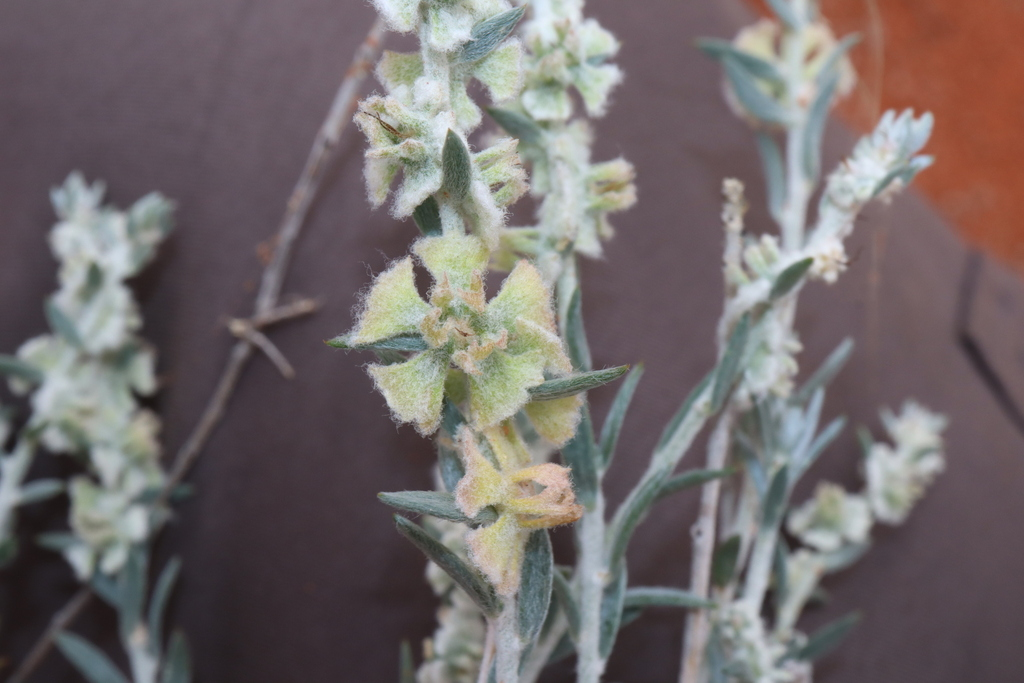

Scientific classification
- Kingdom: Plantae
- Clade: Tracheophytes
- Clade: Angiosperms
- Clade: Eudicots
- Order: Caryophyllales
- Family: Amaranthaceae
- Genus: Maireana
- Species: M. lobiflora

Binomial name
- Maireana lobiflora (F.Muell. ex Benth.) Paul G.Wilson

Synonyms
- Kochia lobiflora F.Muell. ex Benth.

= Maireana lobiflora =

Species of plant

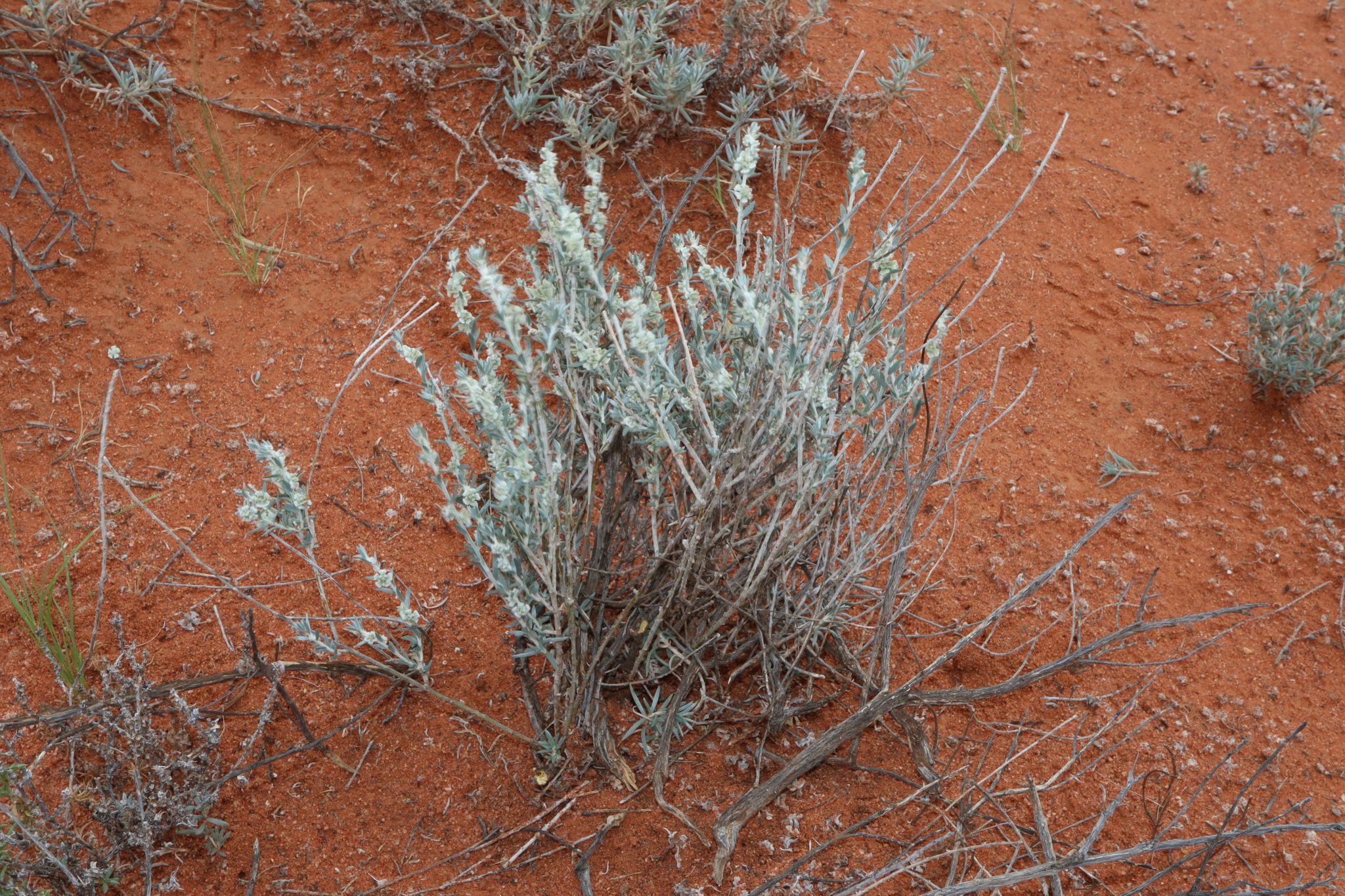
Habit west of Mutawintji

Maireana lobiflora, commonly known as lobed bluebush, is a species of flowering plant in the family Amaranthaceae and is endemic to Australia. It is a prostrate or low-lying perennial herb or shrub with woolly branches, very narrowly elliptic leaves, and bisexual flowers arranged singly, the fruiting perianth with a wing with five fan-shaped lobes and erect processes.

== Description ==
Maireana lobiflora is a prostrate or low-lying perennial herb or small shrub that typically grows to a height of up to 50 cm (20 in) and has branches covered with short, woolly hairs. Its leaves are arranged alternately, linear to very narrowly elliptic, mostly 7–15 mm (0.28–0.59 in) long, and covered with silky hairs. The flowers are bisexual, arranged singly and covered with woolly hairs. The fruiting perianth is leathery to crusty, with a slightly convex tube, the wing horizontal, up to 10 mm (0.39 in) in diameter with five spatula-shaped to fan-shaped lobes and erect narrowly spatula-shaped to club-shaped processes up to 4 mm (0.16 in) long.

== Taxonomy ==
This species was first described in 1870 by George Bentham who gave it the name Kochia lobiflora in Flora Australiensis from specimens collected in New South Wales on the "high sandy banks of the Darling River on the Victorian Exploring Expedition", from an unpublished description by Ferdinand von Mueller. In 1975, Paul G. Wilson transferred the species to Maireana as M. lobiflora in the journal Nuytsia. The specific epithet (lobiflora) means 'lobe-flowered'.

== Distribution and habitat ==
Maireana lobiflora grows in sandy soils in low-lying areas, on river flats and on limestone in all mainly states of Australia and the Northern Territory. In Western Australia it occurs in the Carnarvon, Coolgardie, Great Sandy Desert, Hampton, Little Sandy Desert, Mallee, Murchison and Nullarbor bioregions, in South Australia in the Broken Hill Complex, Eyre Yorke Block, Flinders Lofty Block, Gawler, Great Victoria Desert, Murray Darling Depression, Nullarbor and Stony Plains bioregions, in the Northern Territory in the Burt Plain, Finke, Gawler, Great Sandy Desert, Great Victoria Desert, MacDonnell Ranges, Murray Darling Depression and Stony Plains bioregions, and also in Queensland, the western Plains of New South Wales and the far north-west of Victoria.
