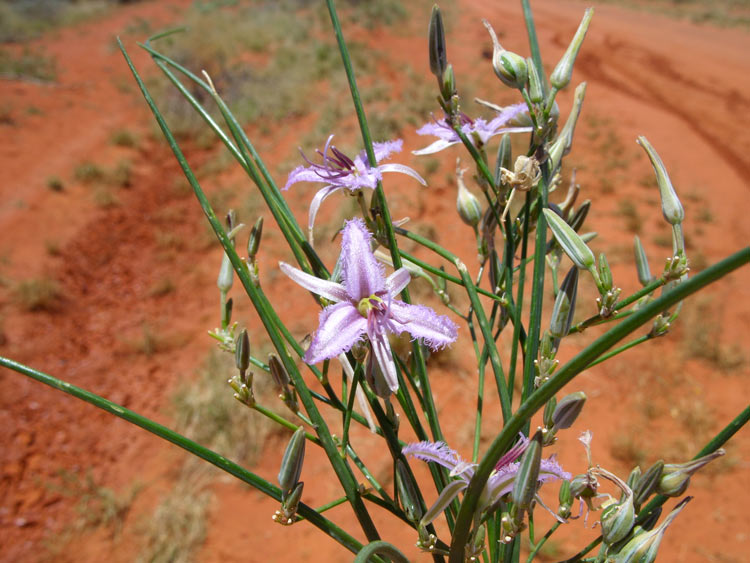

Scientific classification
- Kingdom: Plantae
- Clade: Tracheophytes
- Clade: Angiosperms
- Clade: Monocots
- Order: Asparagales
- Family: Asparagaceae
- Subfamily: Lomandroideae
- Genus: Thysanotus
- Species: T. exiliflorus

Binomial name
- Thysanotus exiliflorus F.Muell.

Synonyms
- Chlamysporum exiliflorum (F.Muell.) Kuntze; Thysanotus exiliflorus auct. non F.Muell.: Black, J.M. (1922)

= Thysanotus exiliflorus =

Species of plant

Thysanotus exiliflorus, commonly known as desert fringed lily, is a species of flowering plant in the Asparagaceae family, and is endemic to inland Australia. It is a tufted perennial herb with spindle-shaped tubers, linear leaves that wither before flowering, flowers arranged in panicles, with lance-shaped sepals, oblong, fringed petals, six stamens and a curved style.

== Description ==
Thysanotus exiliflorus is a tufted perennial herb with tuberous roots, the tubers spindle-shaped and 40–50 mm (1.6–2.0 in) long and about 60–100 mm (2.4–3.9 in) from the stems. Its approximately 4 to 20 leaves are linear, 150–200 mm (5.9–7.9 in) long and 1.0–1.5 mm (0.039–0.059 in) wide but wither before flowering. The flowering stems are arranged in one or two umbels on a pedicel about 5 mm (0.20 in) long, the perianth segments about 7–12 mm (0.28–0.47 in) long. The sepals are lance-shaped, about 3 mm (0.12 in) wide at the base, the petals oblong to egg-shaped, 3 mm (0.12 in) wide with a fringe about 1 mm (0.039 in) wide. There are six stamens, the anthers 2.5–3.0 mm (0.098–0.118 in) long, and the style is slightly curved. Flowering occurs from July to December, and the seeds are more or less spherical, about 2 mm (0.079 in) in diameter.

== Taxonomy ==
Thysanotus exiliflorus was first formally described in 1882 by Ferdinand von Mueller in Transactions, proceedings and report, Royal Society of South Australia. The specific epithet (exiliflorus) means 'small-flowered'.

== Distribution and habitat ==
Thysanotus exiliflorus grows with mulga in sandy red earth and with Hakea leucoptera and Triodia pungens in sandy soil in the Great Victoria Desert, Murchison, Nullarbor and Pilbara bioregions of Western Australia, the Burt Plain, Central Ranges, Finke, Great Sandy Desert, Great Victoria Desert, MacDonnell Ranges, Simpson Strzelecki Dunefields and Tanami bioregions of the Northern Territory, and the Central Ranges, Eyre Yorke Block, Finke, Gawler Great Victoria Desert and Stony Plains bioregions of South Australia.

== Conservation status ==
Thysanotus exfimbriatus is listed as "not threatened" by the Government of Western Australia Department of Biodiversity, Conservation and Attractions, and as of "least concern" under the Northern Territory Territory Parks and Wildlife Conservation Act.
