= Gawler bioregion =

Gawler
- Region
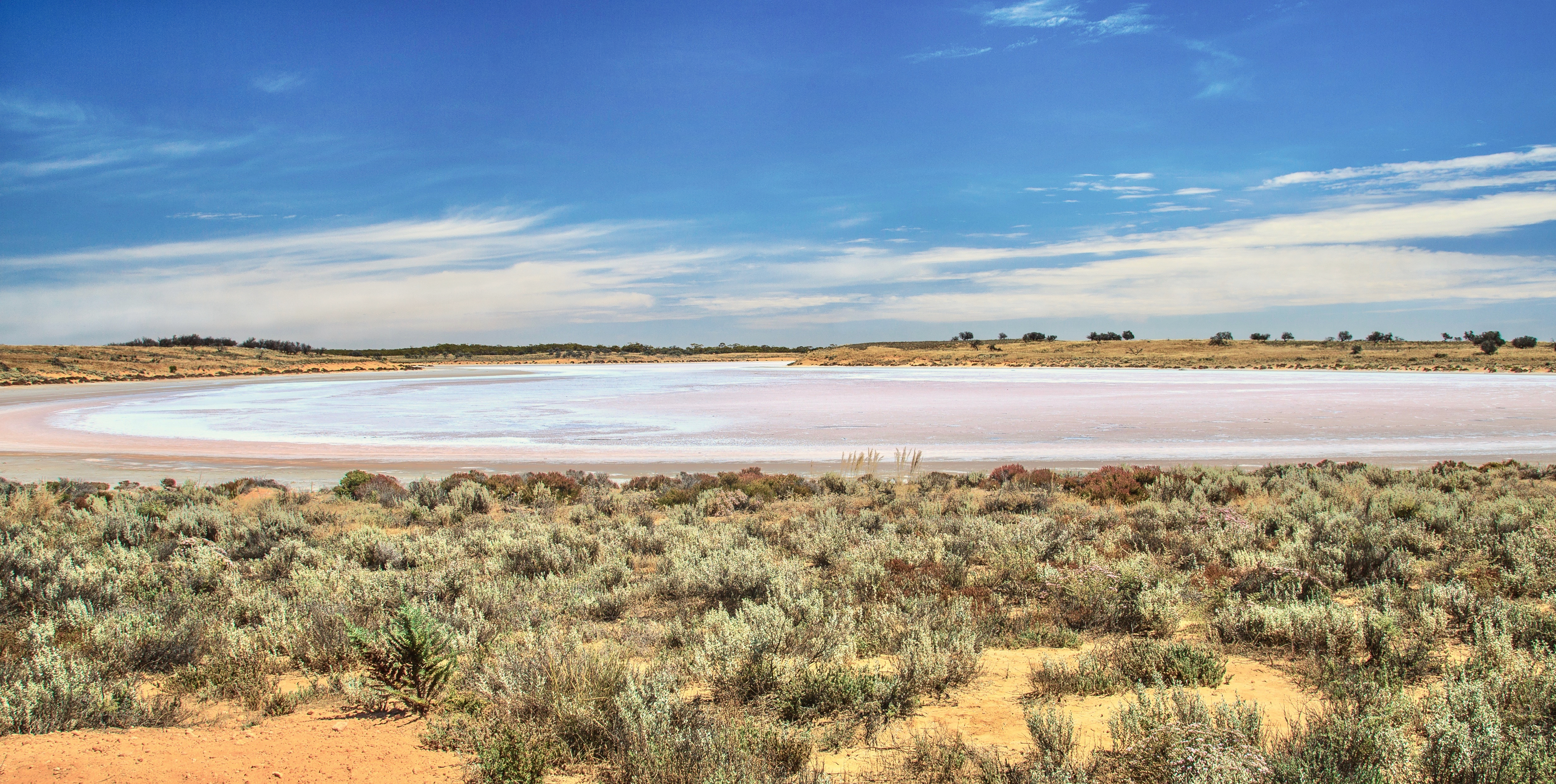
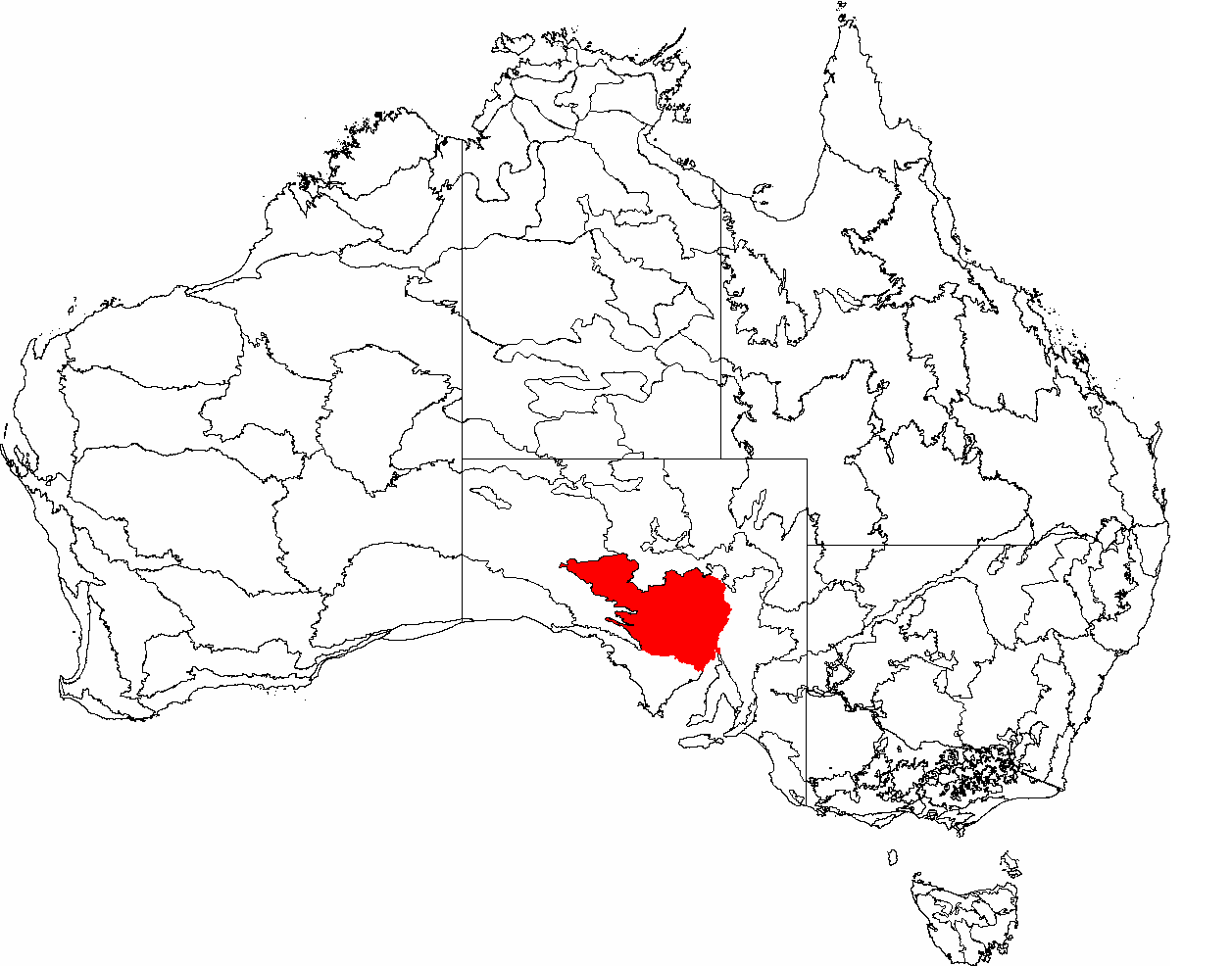
- Salt pan and bluebush (Maireana sp.) in Lake Gairdner National Park The interim Australian bioregions, with Gawler in red
- Country: Australia
- State: South Australia

Area
  - Total: 120,028.83 km^{2} (46,343.39 sq mi)
Regions around Gawler
Great Victoria Desert	Stony Plains	Flinders Lofty Block
Great Victoria Desert	Gawler	Flinders Lofty Block
Great Victoria Desert	Eyre Yorke Block	Spencer Gulf

Gawler is an interim Australian bioregion located in South Australia. It has an area of 12,002,883 hectares (29,659,770 acres). Gawler bioregion is part of the Tirari–Sturt stony desert ecoregion.

== Geography ==
The landscape consists of rolling terrain, rocky hills, plains, and salt-encrusted lake beds. Ephemeral salt lakes, including Lake Torrens, Lake Gairdner, Lake Macfarlane, Lake Everard, Lake Gilles, Lake Harris, and Lake Acraman, cover extensive areas. The Gawler Ranges lie in the southwestern portion of the bioregion. The Flinders Ranges bound the bioregion to the east. In the southeast the bioregion extends to the Spencer Gulf.

== Climate ==
The Gawler bioregion has an arid climate. Rainfall is predominantly in the winter, with a spatially-averaged median of 169 mm annually (1890–2005). Rainfall is higher along the southern edge of the bioregion where it transitions to the Mediterranean climate Eyre Yorke Block.

== Flora and fauna ==
The main plant communities are spinifex grasslands, open woodlands, and chenopod shrublands.

Endemic plants of the Gawler Ranges include Acacia toondulya, Gawler Ranges greenhood (Pterostylis ovata), Gawler Ranges hop-bush (Dodonaea intricata), and Gawler Ranges grevillea (Grevillea parallelinervis). The Lake Acraman button-daisy (Leptorhynchos melanocarpus) is endemic to gypseous soils of the lake flats.

Native mammals include red kangaroo (Osphranter rufus) and western grey kangaroo (Macropus fuliginosus). Threatened species include the yellow-footed rock-wallaby (Petrogale xantropus xanthropus) in the Gawler Ranges and the plains rat (Pseudomys australis) in the stony plains.

Threatened birds native to the bioregion include the western grasswren (Amytornis textilis myall) in the stony plains and chenopod shrublands of the Gawler ranges, the western slender-billed thornbill (Acanthiza iredalei iredalei) in chenopod shrublands, and malleefowl (Leipoa ocellata) in mallee woodlands and shrublands.

The Pernatty knob-tailed gecko (Nephrurus deleani) is endemic to the bioregion. The Lake Eyre dragon (Ctenophorus maculosus) is a lizard which inhabits the salt flats of Lake Torrens, where it lives in cracks in the salt crust.

The ephemeral lakes are important breeding grounds for water birds, including silver gull (Chroicocephalus novaehollandiae), Australian pelican (Pelecanus conspicillatus), black swan (Cygnus atratus), Caspian tern (Hydroprogne caspia), red-necked avocet (Recurvirostra novaehollandiae), red-capped plover (Charadrius ruficapillus), and banded stilt (Cladorhynchus leucocephalus).

The ephemeral freshwater rock-holes present in exposed granite outcrops are a habitat for unique communities of freshwater invertebrates that are otherwise rare in the region.

== Land use ==
Most of the bioregion, except for the salt lake beds, is used for livestock grazing, mainly sheep with some cattle.

The main towns are Whyalla, Port Augusta, Roxby Downs, and Woomera. Mining of copper, uranium, and gold at Olympic Dam mine is a major source of revenue for the local economy. Iron ore is mined around Iron Knob.

== Subregions ==
Gawler bioregion consists of eight subregions:

- Myall Plains (GAW01) – 1,088,767 hectares (2,690,400 acres)
- Gawler Volcanics (GAW02) – 1,556,182 hectares (3,845,410 acres)
- Gawler Lakes (GAW0) – 2,049,193 hectares (5,063,670 acres)
- Arcoona Plateau (GAW04) – 1,089,865 hectares (2,693,120 acres)
- Kingoonya (GAW05) – 1,922,414 hectares (4,750,390 acres)
- Torrens (GAW06) – 1,439,093 hectares (3,556,080 acres)
- Roxby (GAW07) – 1,409,305 hectares (3,482,470 acres)
- Commonwealth Hill (GAW08) – 1,448,062 hectares (3,578,240 acres)

== Protected areas ==
Protected areas in the bioregion include Lake Torrens National Park, Lake Gairdner National Park, the northern portion of Gawler Ranges National Park, Lake Gilles Conservation Park, Witchelina Nature Reserve, Whyalla Conservation Park, the northeastern tip of Yellabinna Regional Reserve, and the Arid Recovery Reserve.
