= Tirari–Sturt stony desert =

Ecoregion in central Australia

Coordinates: 26°55′32.32″S 134°51′28.53″E

Tirari-Sturt stony desert
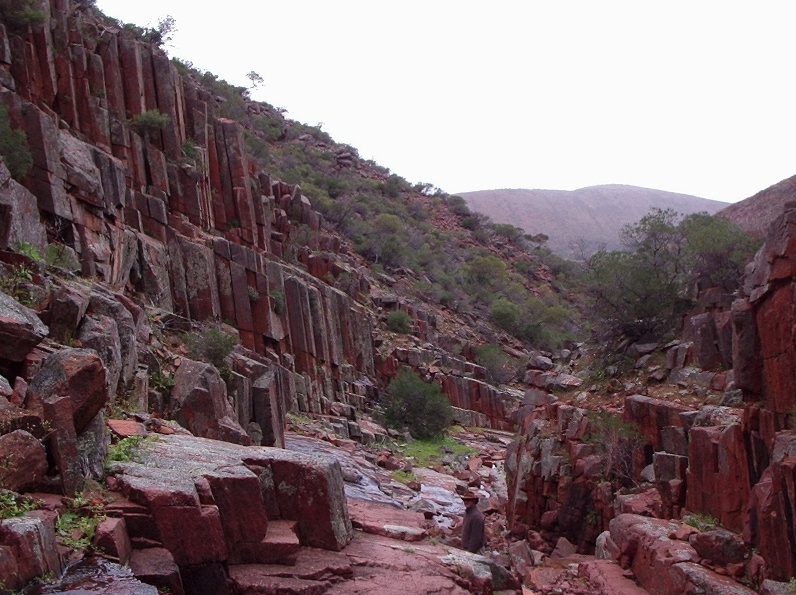
- Gawler Range, South Australia

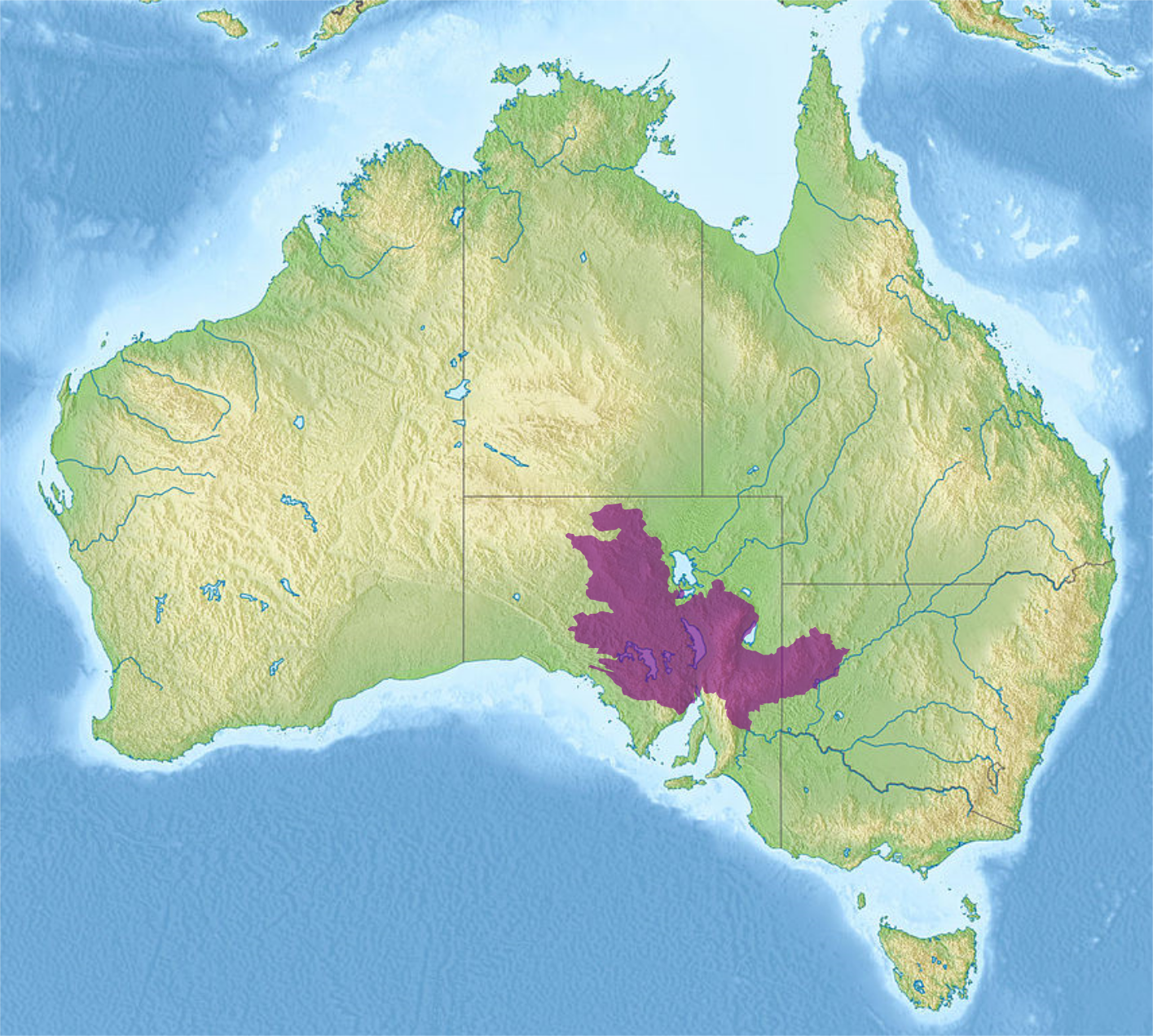
- Ecoregion territory (in purple)

Ecology
- Realm: Australasian
- Biome: deserts and xeric shrublands
- Borders: List: Central Ranges xeric scrub; Eastern Australian mulga shrublands; Eyre and Yorke mallee; Great Victoria Desert; Mount Lofty woodlands; Murray-Darling woodlands and mallee; Simpson Desert; Southeast Australia temperate savanna

Geography
- Area: 376,850 km^{2} (145,500 sq mi)
- Country: Australia
- States: New South Wales; Northern Territory, South Australia

Conservation
- Conservation status: Vulnerable
- Protected: 10.34%

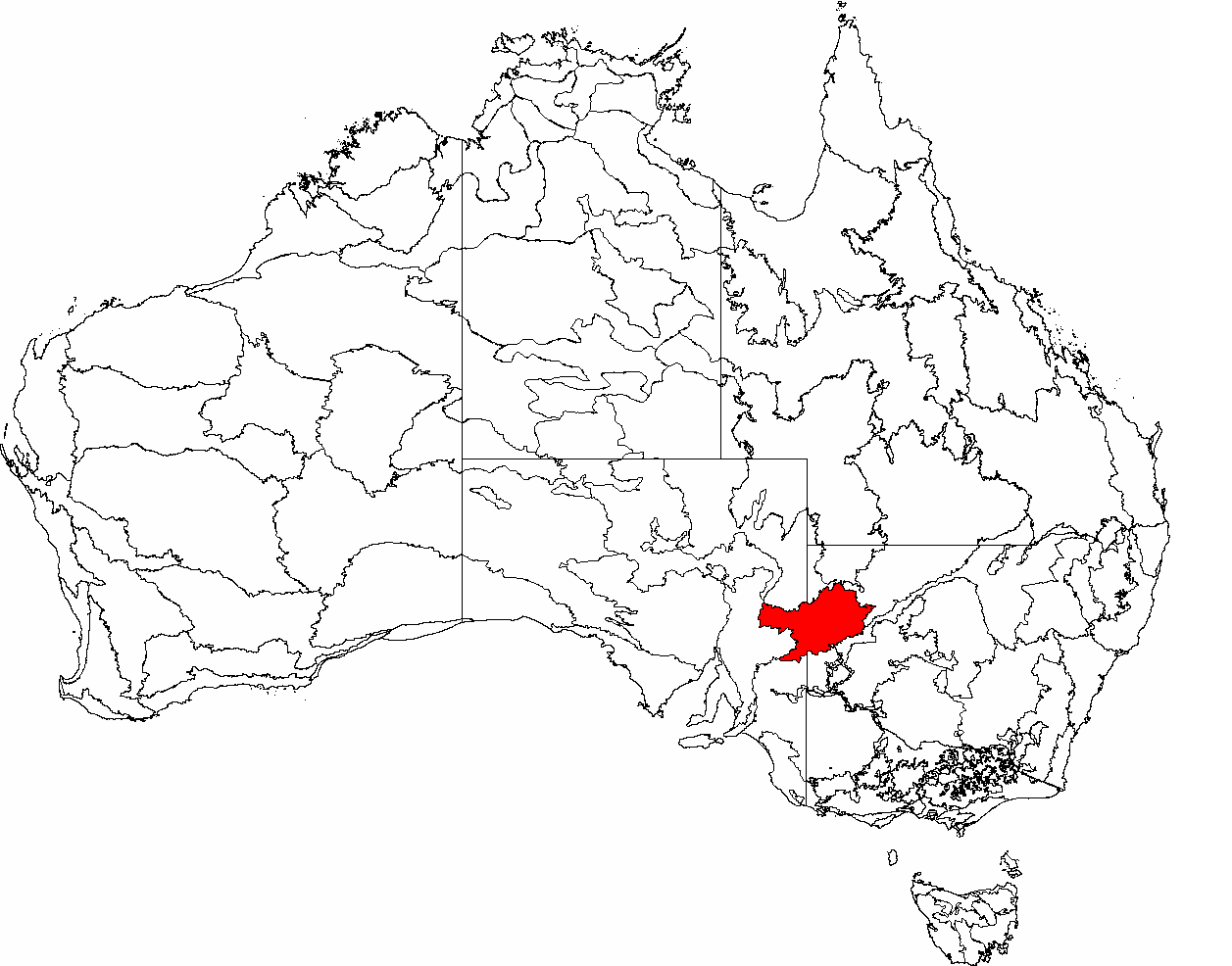
The IBRA regions, with the Broken Hill Complex in red

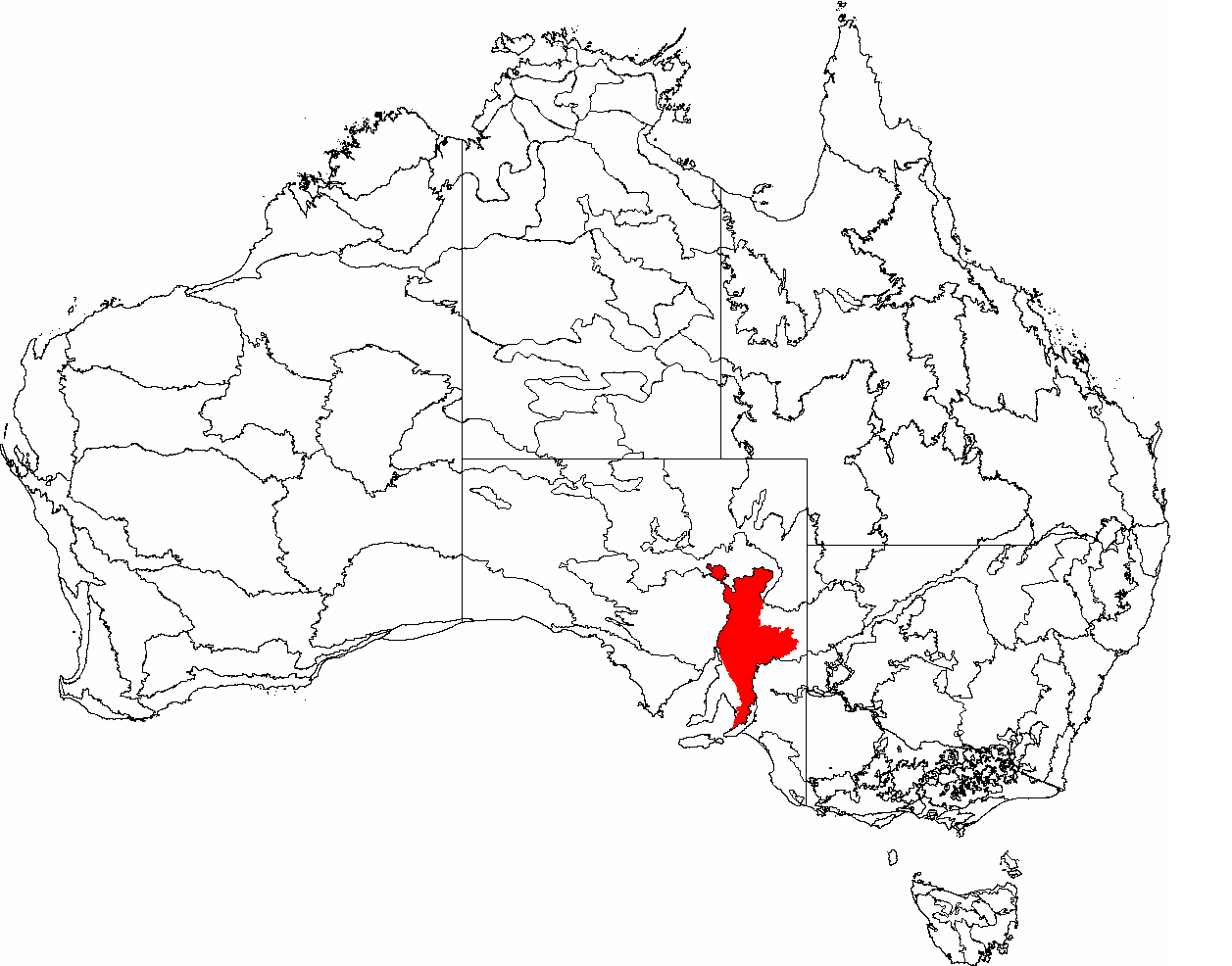
The IBRA regions, with the Flinders Lofty Block in red

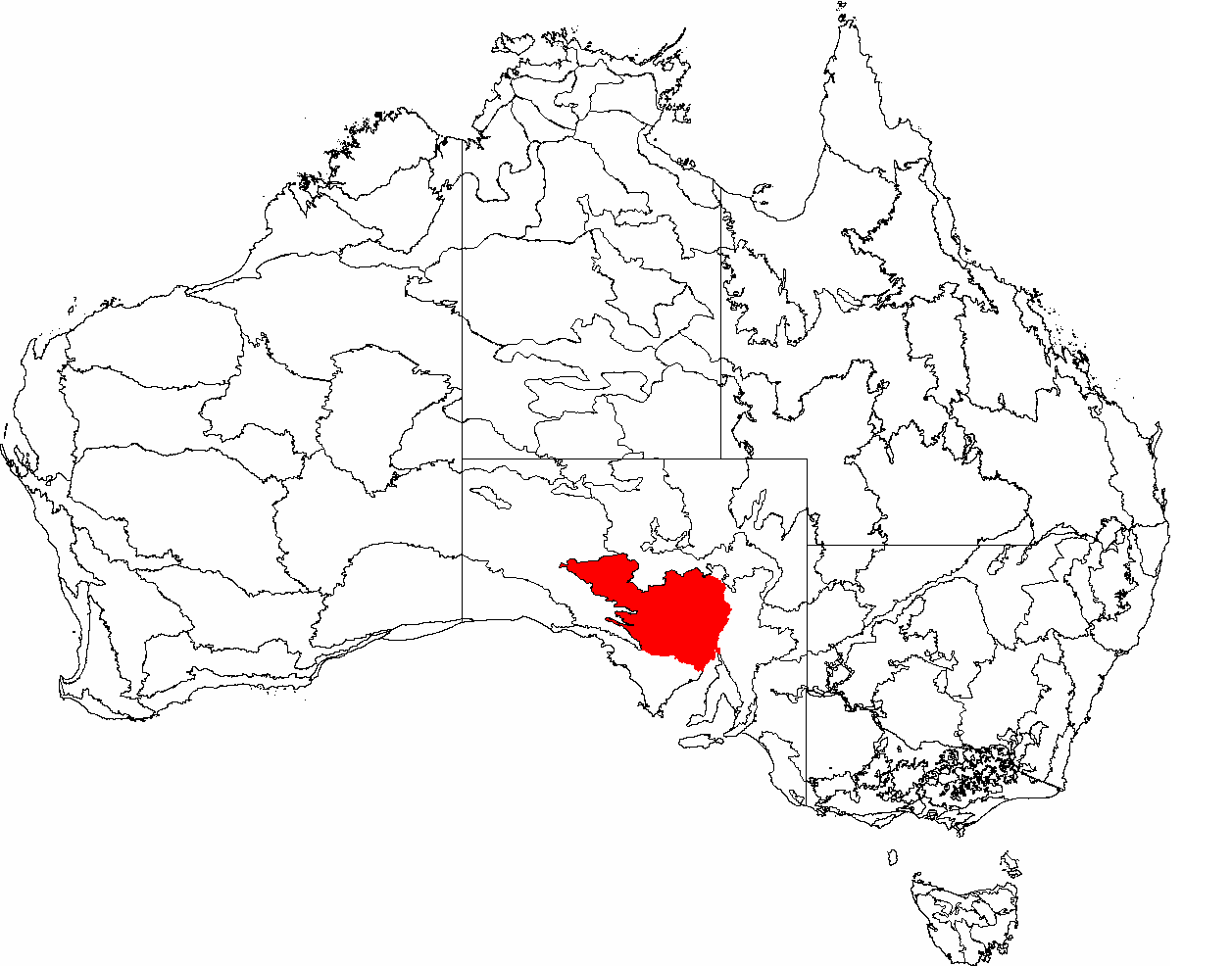
The IBRA regions, with Gawler in red

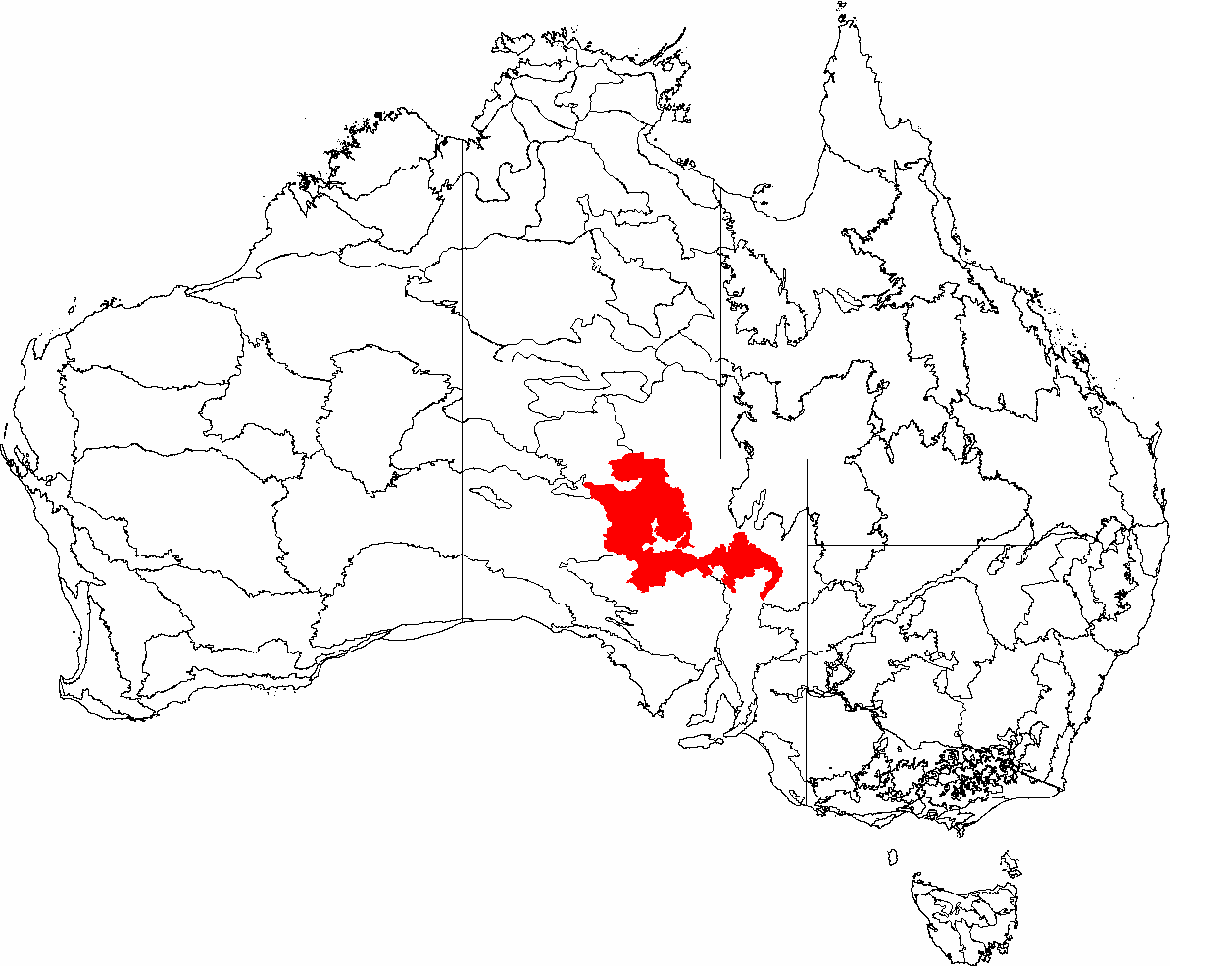
The IBRA regions, with the Stony Plains in red

The Tirari–Sturt stony desert is a deserts and xeric shrublands ecoregion in central Australia.

== Location and description ==
The Tirari–Sturt stony desert ecoregion contains the gibber plains (desert pavement) and red sands of the large Sturt Stony Desert, the Tirari Desert to its southwest and the Flinders and Gawler Ranges to the south. The Tirari has more sand dunes than the Sturt Stony Desert and has also been the site of some important fossil findings. Towns of the ecoregion include the opal mining centre of Coober Pedy, famous for its underground dwellings. The climate is very hot with summer temperatures reaching 50 °C.

The region consists of the Stony Plains, Gawler, Flinders Lofty Block and the Broken Hill Complex bioregions of the Interim Biogeographic Regionalisation for Australia (IBRA).

== Flora and fauna ==
As well as stony plain and sands there are areas of chenopod, mallee and mulga wooded scrubland. The region is home to a variety of wildlife that has adapted to the hot dry conditions including the wedge-tailed eagles, yellow-footed rock wallaby, red kangaroos, and western grey kangaroos of the Flinders Ranges.

The desert proper is uninhabitable and the environment there remains undamaged, while the greener fringe are used for sheep grazing.

== Protected areas ==
10.34% of the ecoregion is in protected areas. Protected areas include:

- Bimbowrie Conservation Park
- Black Rock Conservation Park
- Bon Bon Station Conservation Reserve
- Boolcoomatta Conservation Reserve
- Buckaringa Private Nature Reserve
- Bunkers Conservation Reserve
- Caroona Creek Conservation Park
- Coongie Lakes Ramsar Site, Wetland of International Importance
- Danggali Wilderness Protection Area
- Ediacara Conservation Park
- Elliot Price Conservation Park
- Gawler Ranges National Park
- Hiltaba Nature Reserve
- Ikara-Flinders Ranges National Park
- Ironstone Hill Conservation Park
- Kanku-Breakaways Conservation Park
- Kati Thanda-Lake Eyre National Park
- Kinchega National Park
- Lake Frome Regional Reserve
- Lake Gairdner National Park
- Lake Gilles Conservation Park
- Lake Torrens National Park
- Mount Brown Conservation Park
- Mount Willoughby Indigenous Protected Area
- Munyaroo Conservation Park
- Mutawintji Nature Reserve
- Mutawintji National Park
- Nantawarrina Indigenous Protected Area
- Pandappa Conservation Park
- Pinkawillinie Conservation Park
- Pualco Range Conservation Park
- Red Banks Conservation Park
- Simpson Desert Regional Reserve
- Strzelecki Regional Reserve
- The Dutchmans Stern Conservation Park
- Upper Spencer Gulf Marine Park
- Vulkathunha-Gammon Ranges National Park
- Wabma Kadarbu Mound Springs Conservation Park
- Whyalla Conservation Park
- Winninowie Conservation Park
- Witchelina Nature Reserve
- Witjira National Park
- Yalpara Conservation Park
- Yappala Indigenous Protected Area
- Yellabinna Regional Reserve
- Yellabinna Wilderness Protection Area
- Yumbarra Conservation Park
