= Maireana suaedifolia =

Scientific classification
- Kingdom: Plantae
- Clade: Tracheophytes
- Clade: Angiosperms
- Clade: Eudicots
- Order: Caryophyllales
- Family: Amaranthaceae
- Genus: Maireana
- Species: M. suaedifolia

Binomial name
- Maireana suaedifolia (Paul G.Wilson) Paul G.Wilson

Synonyms
- Kochia suaedifolia Paul G.Wilson

Species of plant in the amaranth family

Maireana suaedifolia, commonly known as lax bluebush, is a species of flowering plant in the family Amaranthaceae, native to Western Australia and South Australia. It is a weak, spreading, dark bluish green shrub with slender, glaucous branches, fleshy leaves narrowed at the base, bisexual flowers arranged singly and a glabrous perianth with a thin, papery wing with a single radial slit.

== Description ==
Maireana suaedifolia is a weak, spreading, dark bluish green shrub that typically grows to a height of up to 50 cm (20 in) and has slender, striated, glaucous branches. Its leaves are arranged alternately, well spaced, fleshy and narrowed at the base. The leaves on the fruiting branchlets are spindle-shaped, about 5 mm (0.20 in) long, and those on the main branches are terete and up to 25 mm (0.98 in) long. The flowers are bisexual and arranged singly, the fruiting perianth glabrous, with a short hemispherical, thin-walled tube. The wing is thin, horizontal with a single radial slit, 8–12 mm (0.31–0.47 in) in diameter.

== Taxonomy ==
This species was first formally described in 1965 by Paul G. Wilson who gave it the name Kochia suaedifolia in the Supplement to J.M.Black's Flora of South Australia (Second Edition, 1943-1957) from specimens collected near the Ooldea Soak in 1951. In 1975, Wilson transferred the species to Maireana as M. suaedifolia in the journal Nuytsia. The specific epithet (suaedifolia) means Suaeda-leaved.

== Distribution and habitat ==
Maireana suaedifolia grows on sand dunes around salt lakes and on alluvial plains in the Avon Wheatbelt, Coolgardie, Esperance Plains, Gascoyne, Great Victoria Desert, Mallee, Murchison, Pilbara and Yalgoo bioregions of Western Australia and the Eyre Yorke Block, Gawler, Great Victoria Desert and Murray Darling Depression of South Australia.

== Conservation status ==
This species of Maireana is listed as "not threatened" by the Government of Western Australia Department of Biodiversity, Conservation and Attractions. It is widely distributed but apparently now rare, probably due to its being readily eaten by stock.
