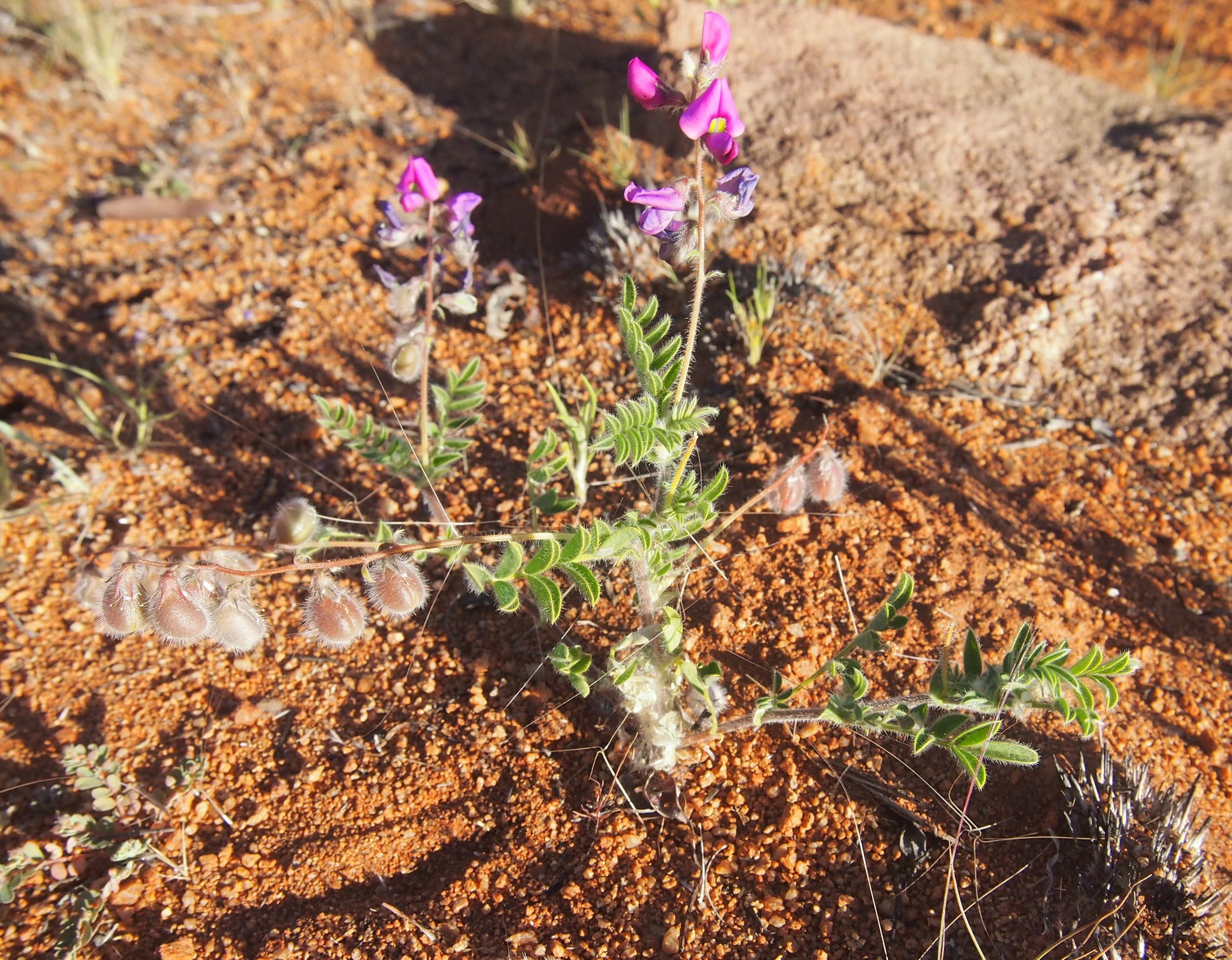

Scientific classification
- Kingdom: Plantae
- Clade: Tracheophytes
- Clade: Angiosperms
- Clade: Eudicots
- Clade: Rosids
- Order: Fabales
- Family: Fabaceae
- Subfamily: Faboideae
- Genus: Swainsona
- Species: S. villosa

Binomial name
- Swainsona villosa J.M.Black

= Swainsona villosa =

Species of legume

Swainsona villosa is a species of flowering plant in the family Fabaceae and is endemic to central Australia. It is a prostrate or ascending plant, with imparipinnate leaves with 7 to 15 egg-shaped leaflets with the narrower end towards the base, and racemes of 2 to 15 usually purple, sometimes pink or white flowers.

== Description ==
Swainsona villosa is a prostrate or ascending plant up to about 20 cm (7.9 in) high with many stems, often with their bases below the surface of the soil. The leaves are imparipinnate, mostly 30–80 mm (1.2–3.1 in) long with 7 to 15 egg-shaped leaflets with the narrower end towards the base, the side leaflets 5–15 mm (0.20–0.59 in) long and 2–6 mm (0.079–0.236 in) wide with broad, stipules 5–15 mm (0.20–0.59 in) long, often with a long tapering tip, at the base of the petioles. The flowers are usually purple, sometimes pink or white, arranged in racemes of 2 to 15, on a peduncle about 1–2 mm (0.039–0.079 in) wide, each flower 7–10 mm (0.28–0.39 in) long on a dark, hairy pedicel 1–3 mm (0.039–0.118 in) long. The sepals are joined at the base to form a tube about 1.5 mm (0.059 in) long, with teeth often twice as long as the tube. The standard petal is 8–11 mm (0.31–0.43 in) long and 9–15 mm (0.35–0.59 in) wide, the wings 9–11 mm (0.35–0.43 in) long and the keel 8–11 mm (0.31–0.43 in) long and 3.0–3.5 mm (0.12–0.14 in) deep. Flowering mainly occurs from July to August, and the fruit is an oblong to almost spherical pod 8–15 mm (0.31–0.59 in) long and 9–10 mm (0.35–0.39 in) wide with the remains of the style 5–7 mm (0.20–0.28 in) long.

== Taxonomy and naming ==
Swainsona villosa was first formally described in 1924 by John McConnell Black in the Flora of South Australia from specimens collected in the Musgrave Ranges. The specific epithet (villosa) means "with long, soft hairs".

== Distribution ==
This Swainson-pea grows on sandy or loamy soils on stone and sandplains in the north of South Australia, in the Central Ranges, Finke, Great Sandy Desert, Great Victoria Desert, MacDonnell Ranges, Stony Plains of southern Northern Territory, and the Central Ranges, Gascoyne and Great Sandy Desert bioregions of Western Australia.
