= Swainsona unifoliolata =

Scientific classification
- Kingdom: Plantae
- Clade: Tracheophytes
- Clade: Angiosperms
- Clade: Eudicots
- Clade: Rosids
- Order: Fabales
- Family: Fabaceae
- Subfamily: Faboideae
- Genus: Swainsona
- Species: S. unifoliolata

Binomial name
- Swainsona unifoliolata F.Muell.

Synonyms
- Swainsonia unifoliolata F.Muell. orth. var.

Species of flowering plant

Swainsona unifoliolata is a species of flowering plant in the family Fabaceae and is endemic to Central Australia. It is an erect or ascending perennial plant, usually with one leaflet and racemes of about 4 to 15 purple flowers.

== Description ==
Swainsona unifoliolata is an erect or ascending perennial herb up to 30 cm (12 in) high with leaves 10–70 mm (0.39–2.76 in) long with a single leaflet, or occasionally 3 leaflets, the leaflets egg-shaped, mostly 10–26 mm (0.39–1.02 in) long and 5–15 mm (0.20–0.59 in) wide. There is a stipule 3–5 mm (0.12–0.20 in) long at the base of the petiole. The flowers are arranged in racemes with 4 to 15 flowers on a peduncle 0.5–1.5 mm (0.020–0.059 in) wide, each flower 6–10 mm (0.24–0.39 in) long on a hairy pedicel usually 2 mm (0.079 in) long. The sepals are joined at the base, forming a tube 1.5–2.0 mm (0.059–0.079 in) long, the sepal lobes about the same length the tube. The petals are purple, the standard petal 7–13 mm (0.28–0.51 in) long and 6–11 mm (0.24–0.43 in) wide, the wings 7–10 mm (0.28–0.39 in) long, and the keel about 7–10 mm (0.28–0.39 in) long and 2–3 mm (0.079–0.118 in) deep. The fruit is narrowly elliptic and often curved, 20–25 mm (0.79–0.98 in) long and 2–4 mm (0.079–0.157 in) wide, with the remains of the curved or coiled style about 3–4 mm (0.12–0.16 in) long. Flowering occurs from April to October.

== Taxonomy ==
Swainsona unifoliolata was first formally described in 1874 by Ferdinand von Mueller in his Fragmenta Phytographiae Australiae. The specific epithet (unifoliolata) means "having one leaflet".

== Distribution and habitat ==
This species of pea grows on gypsum or limestone on salt flats and the edges of salt lakes in the Avon Wheatbelt, Central Ranges, Gibson Desert, Great Sandy Desert, Great Victoria Desert, Little Sandy Desert, Murchison, Pilbara and Tanami bioregions of inland Western Australia, South Australia, and Finke, Great Sandy Desert, MacDonnell Ranges, Simpson Strzelecki Dunefields and Tanami bioregions of southern Northern Territory.
