= Stony Plain =

Stony Plain may refer to:

- Reg, a landform consisting in a vast desertic stony plain
- Stony Plain, Alberta, a town in Canada
- Stony Plain (electoral district), a provincial electoral district in Alberta
- Stony Plain 135, Alberta, an Indian Reserve in Canada
- Stony Plain Records, a Canadian independent record label
- Stony Plains, a bioregion of Australia
