= Sturt Stony Desert =

Desert in central-Eastern Australia

- Sturt's Stony, Stony
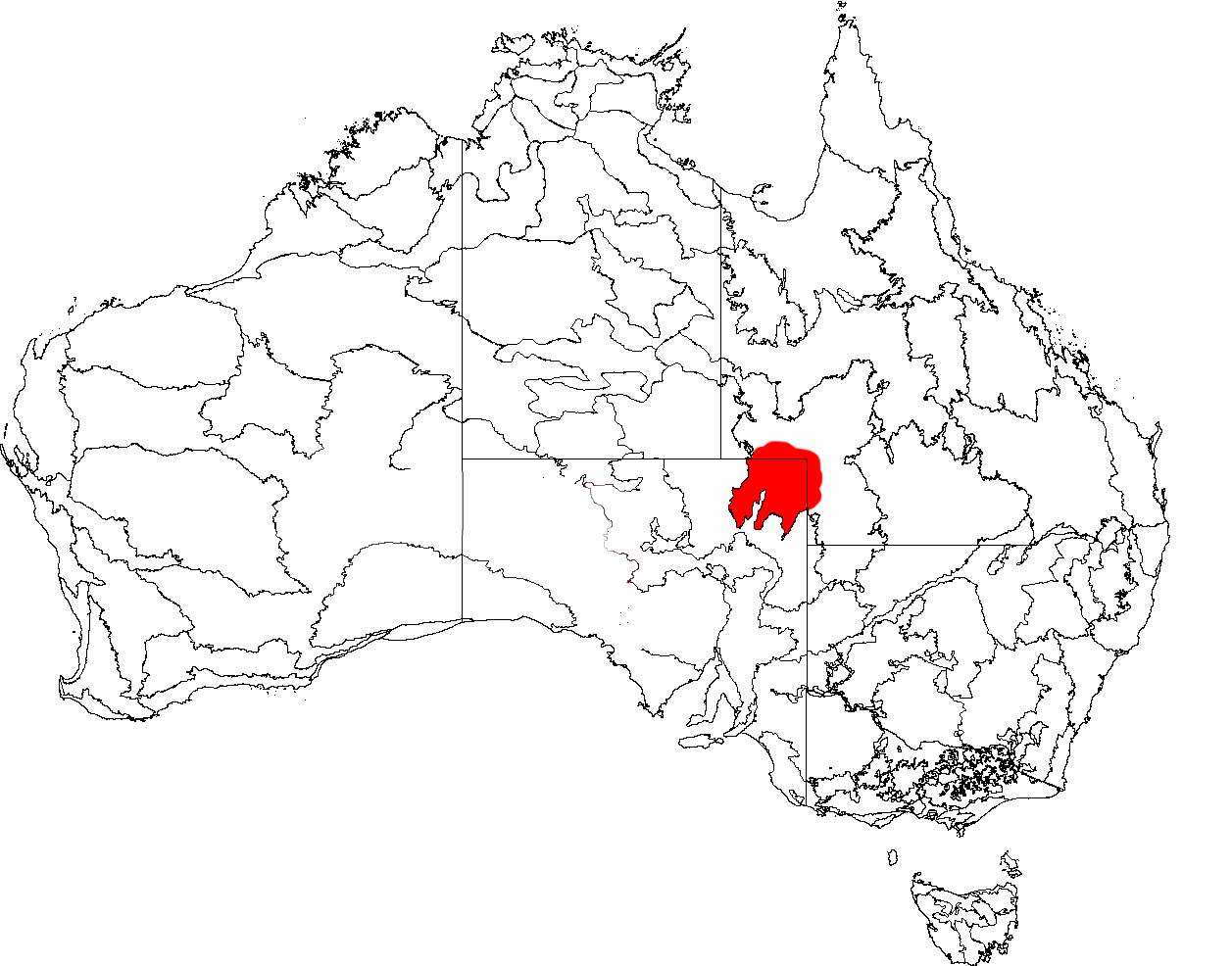
- Position of Sturt Stony Desert in Australia

Geography
- Country: Australia
- State: South Australia, Queensland
- Coordinates: 27°S 140°E

Sturt Stony Desert (previously Sturt's Stony Desert) is an area in the north-east of South Australia, far south western border area of Queensland and the far west of New South Wales.

It was named by Charles Sturt in 1844, while he was trying to find the inland sea which he believed lay at the centre of Australia. The stones caused his horses to limp and wore down the hooves of the cattle and sheep which Sturt had taken on the expedition.

The larger Simpson Desert is located to the west and the Strzelecki Desert is to the south east. Between these two dunefields is the Gason Dome, upon which the Sturt Stony Desert is located. To the south west of Sturt Stony Desert is the Tirari Desert. The Birdsville Track is a route between Marree in South Australia and Birdsville in Queensland.

== Landscape ==
Much of the desert is covered by gibber. Sturt suggested the closely compacted stones were the result of currents moving across an ancient seafloor. However, the gibber plains originated from desert sandstone sheets which once covered the area. Weather has slowly broken down the sandstone with the harder fragments remaining.

Both circular and stepped gilgai have been found in the desert.

== Ecology ==
The desert is part of the Tirari-Sturt stony desert ecoregion. It is home to the Kowari, a small but feisty carnivorous marsupial which hunts nocturnally on the vast gibber plains. One of the kowari's main prey is the Long-haired Rat, a native rodent whose population occasionally booms to extraordinary numbers. During the booms thousands of rats can sing from their burrows, creating a hum which rises through the earth and fills the desert night. Because of this, they are sometimes called the Singing Rat. Booming rat populations provide bountiful food for kowaris, inland taipan, dingoes and the rare Letter-winged Kite.

== See also ==
- Deserts of Australia
- List of deserts by area
