= Mount Lofty woodlands =

Ecoregion in South Australia

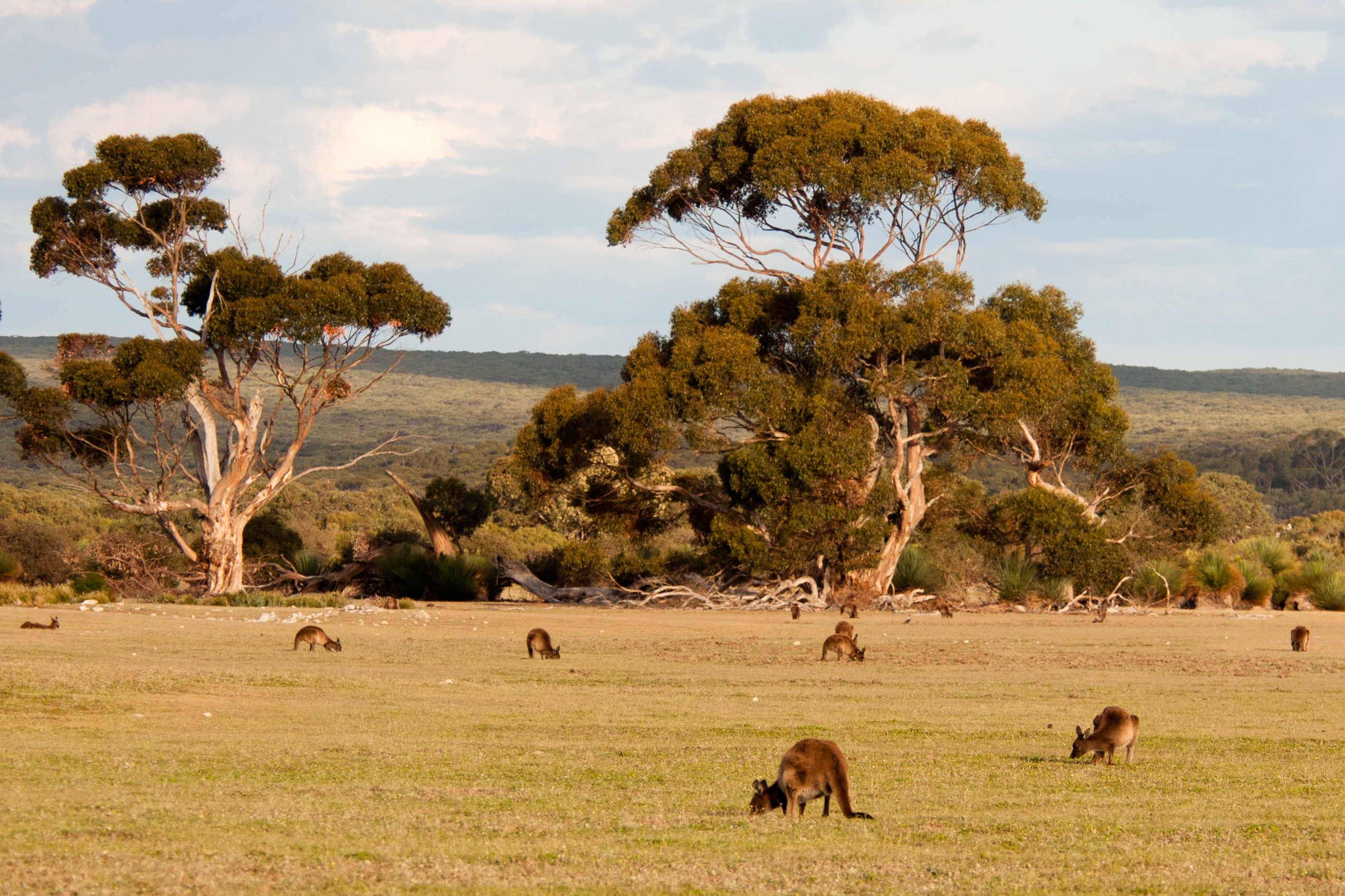
- Kangaroo Island kangaroos (Macropus fuliginosus fuliginosus), Karatta, Kangaroo Island, South Australia

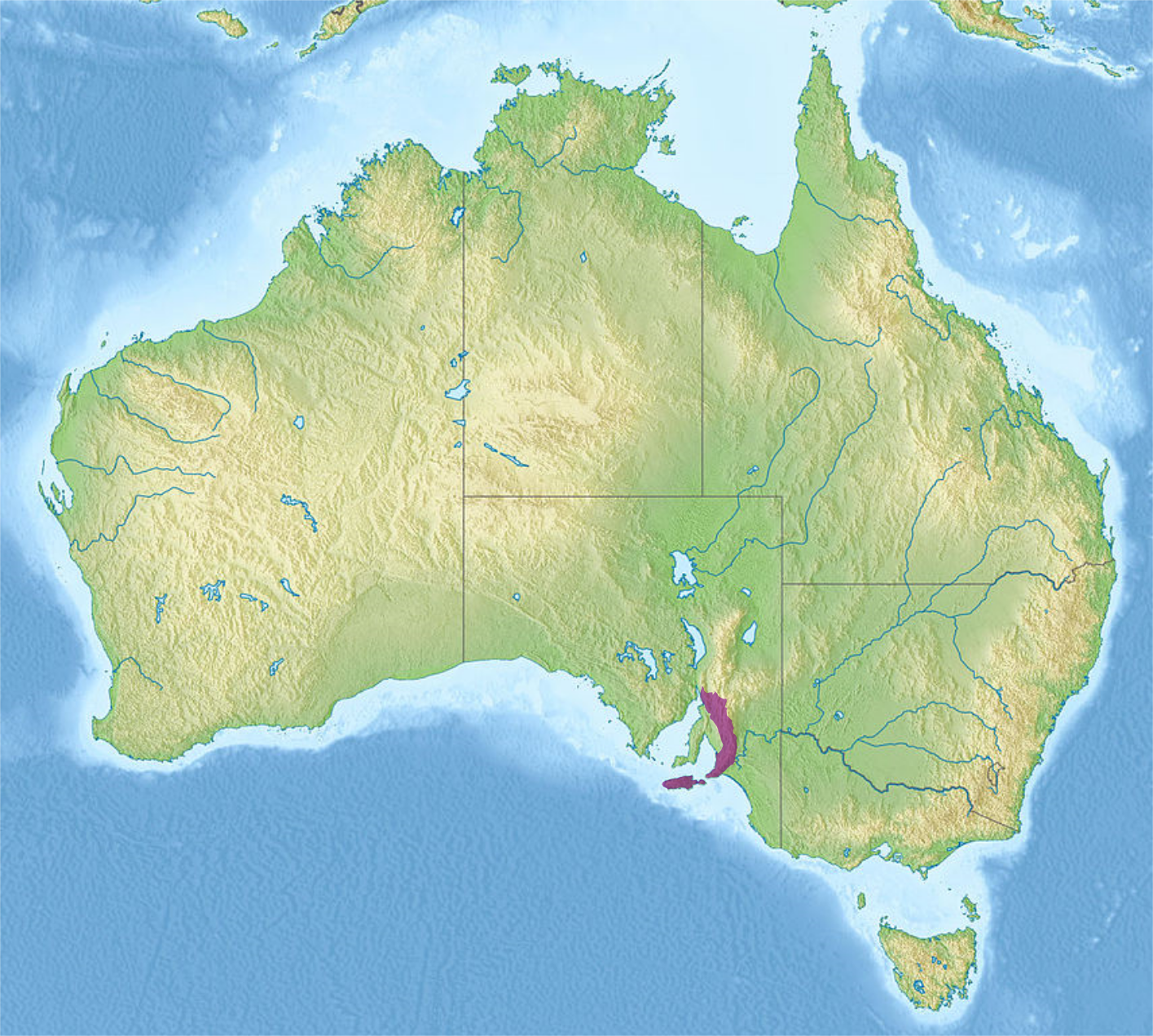
- Ecoregion territory (in purple)

Ecology
- Realm: Australasian
- Biome: Mediterranean forests, woodlands, and scrub
- Borders: Eyre and Yorke mallee; Murray-Darling woodlands and mallee; Tirari-Sturt stony desert; Temperate Grassland of South Australia

Geography
- Area: 23,800 km^{2} (9,200 sq mi)
- Country: Australia
- States: South Australia
- Coordinates: 34.75°S 138.85°E

Conservation
- Conservation status: Critical/endangered
- Protected: 8.92%

The Mount Lofty woodlands, or the Peppermint Box Grassy Woodland of South Australia, is an ecoregion in South Australia, which includes woodlands, shrublands, and grasslands in the Mount Lofty Ranges, Fleurieu Peninsula, and Kangaroo Island.

== Location and description ==
The ecoregion includes the Mount Lofty Range, Fleurieu Peninsula, and Kangaroo Island, including the city of Adelaide. The ecoregion is bounded on the east by the Murray-Darling woodlands and mallee ecoregion, on the west by the Eyre and Yorke mallee, and on the north by the Tirari-Sturt stony desert.

The ecoregion corresponds to the former Lofty Ranges IBRA region. It includes the current (version 7) Kanmantoo IBRA region and the southern portion of Flinders Lofty Block region.

== Climate ==
The ecoregion has a Mediterranean climate. The Mount Lofty Ranges intercept southwesterly winter winds, creating orographic rainfall. Rainfall ranges from nearly 900 mm on the high peaks of the southern range to below 400 in the northern portion of the range.

== Flora ==
Plant communities include sclerophyll forests and woodlands, open woodlands and savannas, mallee shrublands, and grasslands. Species of Eucalyptus are the predominant trees, and the species composition varies with elevation, rainfall, and soils. Peppermint Box (Eucalyptus odorata) is the dominant species of the tree canopy. Other tree species include Eucalyptus microcarpa, Eucalyptus leucoxylon, Eucalyptus cladocalyx, Eucalyptus porosa, Bursaria spinosa, Acacia pycnantha, Allocasuarina verticillata, Callitris glaucophylla, and Callitris preissii. Grasses and herbs include Austrodanthonia spp., Austrostipa spp., Lomandra spp. and Dianella revoluta.

== Fauna ==
The short-beaked echidna (Tachyglossus aculeatus) is found throughout the ecoregion. The platypus (Ornithorhynchus anatinus) no longer lives on the South Australian mainland. The platypus was introduced to Flinders-Chase National Park on Kangaroo Island between 1928 and 1946, and is currently established on the western portion of the island. Many species of birds and medium-sized mammals have been extirpated from the mainland portion of the ecoregion, principally from loss of habitat. Koalas (Phascolarctos cinereus) were introduced to Kangaroo Island in the 1920s. As koala numbers increased, over-browsing caused declines in some native eucalypts, particularly the rough-barked manna gum (Eucalyptus viminalis ssp. cygnetensis). The Government's Koala Management Program captures and sterilizes koalas, plants trees of the over-browsed species, and fixes collars on some trees to prevent koalas from climbing them.

== Protected areas ==
8.82% of the ecoregion is in protected areas.

Most of the mainland portion has been converted to agriculture or pasture.

Protected areas in the mainland include Mount Remarkable National Park, Belair National Park, and Onkaparinga River National Park.

Protected areas on Kangaroo Island include Flinders Chase National Park, Ravine des Casoars Wilderness Protection Area, Cape Bouguer Wilderness Protection Area, and Cape Gantheaume Wilderness Protection Area.
