= Flinders Lofty Block =

Bioegion in South Australia

- Region
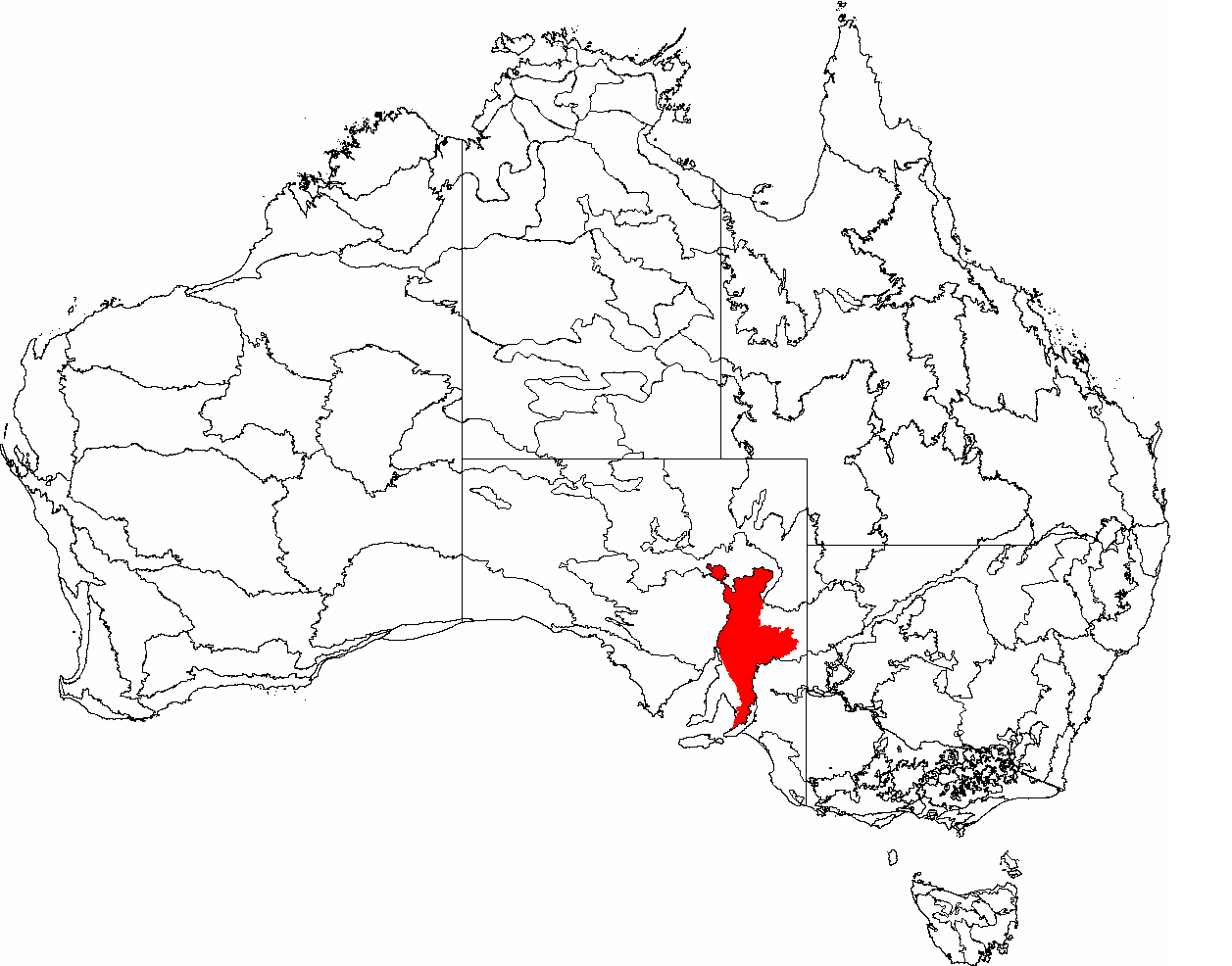
- The interim Australian bioregions, with the Flinders Lofty Block in red
- Country: Australia
- State: South Australia

Area
  - Total: 66,157.65 km^{2} (25,543.61 sq mi)
Regions around Flinders Lofty Block
Gawler	Stony Plains	Broken Hill Complex
Gawler	Flinders Lofty Block	Murray Darling Depression
Eyre Yorke Block	Kanmantoo	Murray Darling Depression

Flinders Lofty Block is an interim Australian bioregion located in South Australia. It has an area of 6,615,765 hectares (16,347,910 acres), which includes the Mount Lofty Ranges and Flinders Ranges.

== Subregions ==
Flinders Lofty Block consists of six subregions:

- Mount Lofty Ranges (FLB01) – 300,580 hectares (742,700 acres)
- Broughton (FLB02) – 1,032,918 hectares (2,552,400 acres)
- Olary Spur (FLB03) – 1,745,479 hectares (4,313,170 acres)
- Southern Flinders (FLB04) – 728,317 hectares (1,799,710 acres)
- Northern Flinders (FLB05) – 1,846,804 hectares (4,563,550 acres)
- Central Flinders (FLB06) – 961,667 hectares (2,376,330 acres)

The Mount Lofty Ranges and Broughton subregions are part of the Mount Lofty woodlands ecoregion. The other subregions are part of the Tirari–Sturt stony desert ecoregion.
