= Dodonaea intricata =

Scientific classification
- Kingdom: Plantae
- Clade: Tracheophytes
- Clade: Angiosperms
- Clade: Eudicots
- Clade: Rosids
- Order: Sapindales
- Family: Sapindaceae
- Genus: Dodonaea
- Species: D. intricata

Binomial name
- Dodonaea intricata J.G.West

Species of plant

Dodonaea intricata, commonly known as Gawler Ranges hop-bush, is a species of flowering plant in the family Sapindaceae and is endemic to Australia. It is a dioecious, spreading shrub with simple, usually oblong leaves, single or paired flowers and capsules usually with four wings.

== Description ==
Dodonaea intricata is a dioecious, spreading shrub that typically grows to a height of up to 1 m (3 ft 3 in). Its leaves are simple, oblong or rarely lance-shaped with the narrower end towards the base or narrowly elliptic, 7–17 mm (0.28–0.67 in) long and 3–5 mm (0.12–0.20 in) wide on a petiole 1–3.5 mm (0.039–0.138 in) long, sometimes with 2 or 3 teeth on the edges. The flowers are borne singly or in pairs on a pedicel 2.5–5 mm (0.098–0.197 in) long, with four egg-shaped to broadly oblong sepals 1.5–2.5 mm (0.059–0.098 in) long but that fall off as the flowers open. There are eight stamens and a glabrous ovary. The fruit is a four-winged, reddish brown capsule, 10–13 mm (0.39–0.51 in) long and 9–14 mm (0.35–0.55 in) wide with wings 2–4 mm (0.079–0.157 in) wide.

== Taxonomy and naming ==
Dodonaea intricata was first formally described in 1984 by Judith Gay West in Brunonia from specimens she collected on Barber Hill on the Gawler Ranges on the Eyre Peninsula in 1977. The specific epithet (intricata) means 'entangled'.

== Distribution and habitat ==
This species of Dodonaea grows on granite hills and rocky outcrops, often with Melaleuca species along and north-east of the Gawler Ranges between Whyalla and Lake Everard in South Australia, and between the northern part of the Paroo River and Adavale-Quilpie in southern central Queensland.

== Conservation status ==
Dodonaea intricata is listed as of "least concern" under the Queensland Government Nature Conservation Act 1992.
