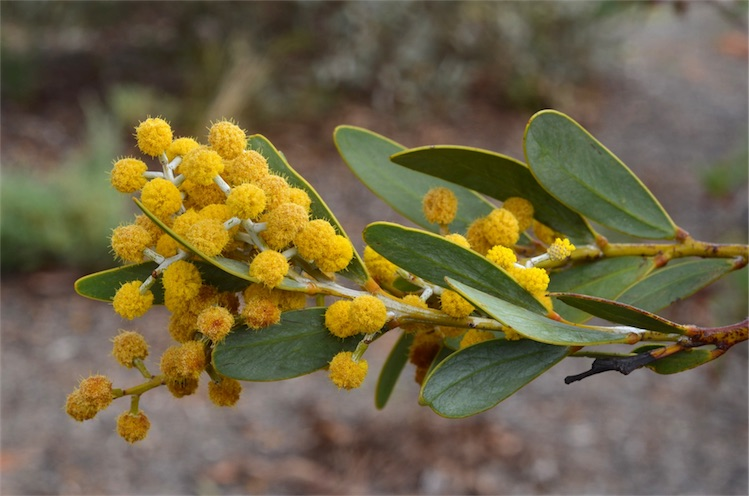

Scientific classification
- Kingdom: Plantae
- Clade: Embryophytes
- Clade: Tracheophytes
- Clade: Spermatophytes
- Clade: Angiosperms
- Clade: Eudicots
- Clade: Rosids
- Order: Fabales
- Family: Fabaceae
- Subfamily: Caesalpinioideae
- Clade: Mimosoid clade
- Genus: Acacia
- Species: A. toondulya

Binomial name
- Acacia toondulya M.O'Leary

= Acacia toondulya =

Toondulya wattle

Species of plant

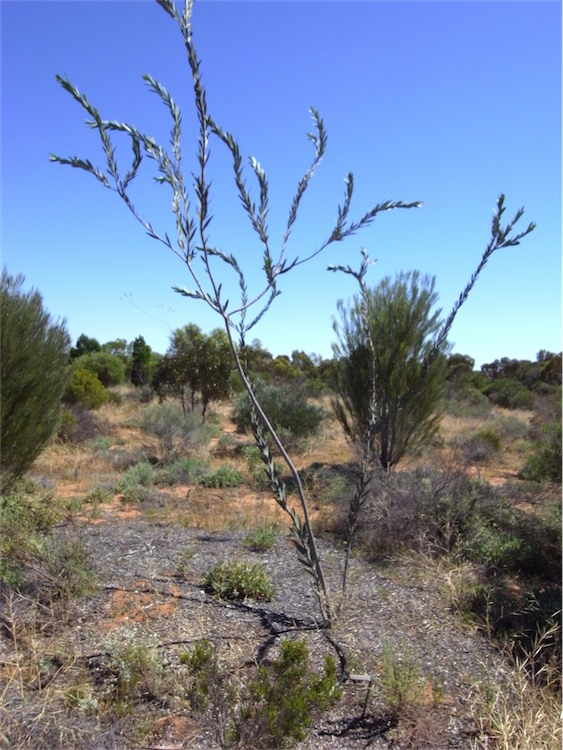
Habit in the Australian Arid Lands Botanic Garden

Acacia toondulya is a tree belonging to the genus Acacia and the subgenus Phyllodineae native to southern Australia.

== Description ==
The tree typically grows to a height of 3 metres (9.8 ft) and has an erect and wispy habit. The glabrous branchlets are coated in a fine white powder and are angled at extremities. Like most species of Acacia it has phyllodes rather than true leaves. The evergreen phyllodes have an elliptic or obovate shape and a length of 3 to 12 cm (1.2 to 4.7 in) and a width of 1 to 3 mm (0.039 to 0.118 in) and have prominent marginal nerves and midrib. It blooms between June and September and produces axillary inflorescences located on the racemes or panicles with spherical to obloid flower-heads that contain 80 to 106 densely packed yellow flowers. Following flowering seed pods form that have a narrowly oblong shape and are raised over the seeds. The firmly chartaceous to slightly coriaceous pods are 30 to 50 mm (1.2 to 2.0 in) in length and 9 to 13 mm (0.35 to 0.51 in). The seeds are transversely arranged and have an oblong-elliptic shape and are 4 to 7 mm (0.16 to 0.28 in) in length with a dark red-brown, clavate aril.

== Distribution ==
It is endemic only in a small area in South Australia from south western parts of the Gawler Range in the north and on the Eyre Peninsula in the south to around the southern parts of the Tothill Ranges in the south where it is found on rocky hills. It is found from Toondulya Bluff in the west to around the hills near Hiltaba in the east and down to Lake Acraman in the south where it is found on low rocky hills composed of granite and shale growing in loamy soils as a part of open shrubland and Triodia grassland communities.

== See also ==
- List of Acacia species
