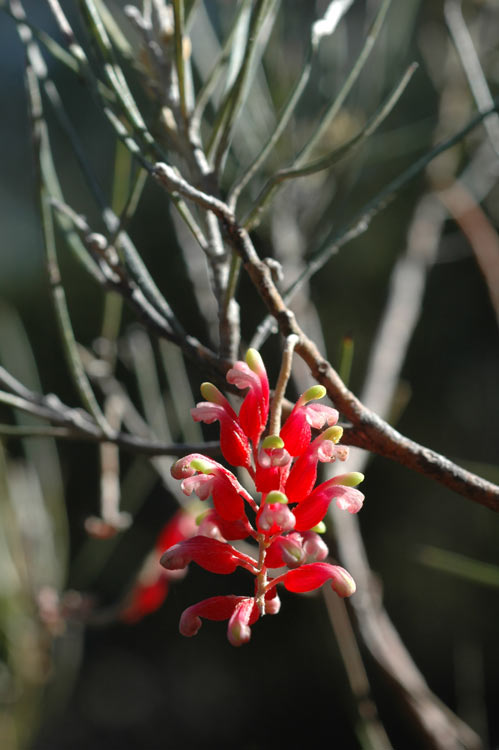
- In the Australian National Botanic Gardens

Scientific classification
- Kingdom: Plantae
- Clade: Tracheophytes
- Clade: Angiosperms
- Clade: Eudicots
- Order: Proteales
- Family: Proteaceae
- Genus: Grevillea
- Species: G. parallelinervis

Binomial name
- Grevillea parallelinervis Carrick

= Grevillea parallelinervis =

Species of shrub endemic to South Australia

Grevillea parallelinervis is a species of flowering plant in the family Proteaceae and is endemic to South Australia. It is a spreading shrub with sharply-pointed, linear leaves, and down-turned clusters of red flowers with a green-tipped style.

== Description ==
Grevillea parallelinervis is a shrub that typically grows to a height of 0.5–2 m (1 ft 8 in – 6 ft 7 in) and has silky- to woolly-hairy branchlets. Its leaves are linear, 25–90 mm (0.98–3.54 in) long, 0.7–1.5 mm (0.028–0.059 in) wide and sharply pointed. The edges of the leaves are rolled downwards, obscuring the lower surface, apart from the mid-vein. The flowers are arranged in down-turned clusters in leaf axils on one side of a rachis 20–50 mm (0.79–1.97 in) long, each flower on a pedicel 3.5–5.5 mm (0.14–0.22 in) long. The flowers are red with a red to reddish-pink syle that has a green tip, the pistil 8–15 mm (0.31–0.59 in) long. Flowering occurs from August to October, and the fruit is a glabrous, narrowly oval follicle 13.5–17 mm (0.53–0.67 in) long.

== Taxonomy ==
Grevillea parallelinervis was first formally described in 1976 by John Carrick in Contributions from the Herbarium Australiense.

== Distribution and habitat ==
This grevillea is found at the western end the Gawler Range between Yardea Station and Mount Wallaby, where it grows in shallow rocky soils in open shrubland.

== See also ==
- List of Grevillea species
