= Pterostylis ovata =

Gawler Range rustyhood

Scientific classification
- Kingdom: Plantae
- Clade: Tracheophytes
- Clade: Angiosperms
- Clade: Monocots
- Order: Asparagales
- Family: Orchidaceae
- Subfamily: Orchidoideae
- Tribe: Cranichideae
- Genus: Pterostylis
- Species: P. ovata

Binomial name
- Pterostylis ovata M.A.Clem.

Synonyms
- Oligochaetochilus mitchellii (M.A.Clem.) Szlach.

Species of orchid

Pterostylis ovata, commonly known as the Gawler Range rustyhood, is a plant in the orchid family Orchidaceae and is endemic to South Australia. Both flowering and non-flowering plants have a rosette of leaves and flowering plants have up to six flowers which have transparent flanges on the petals and a striped, insect-like labellum.

== Description ==
Pterostylis ovata is a terrestrial, perennial, deciduous, herb with an underground tuber and a rosette of between three and seven leaves. The leaves are 15–50 mm (0.6–2 in) long and 6–20 mm (0.2–0.8 in) wide. Flowering plants have a rosette at the base of the flowering stem but the leaves are usually withered by flowering time. Up to six translucent greenish-white flowers with red, brown or pink markings and 30–35 mm (1.2–1.4 in) long, 10–12 mm (0.4–0.5 in) wide are crowded together on a flowering spike 80–150 mm (3–6 in) tall. The dorsal sepal and petals form a hood or "galea" over the column with the petals having transparent flanges up to 10 mm (0.4 in) wide on their outer edge. The dorsal sepal has a narrow tip 4–7 mm (0.2–0.3 in) long. The lateral sepals turn downwards, are much wider than the galea and suddenly taper to narrow, parallel tips 8–12 mm (0.3–0.5 in) long. The labellum is reddish with darker stripes, a raised central ridge and is insect-like, 6–8 mm (0.2–0.3 in) long and about 3 mm (0.1 in) wide. The "body" end has between sixteen and twenty short hairs on the sides. Flowering occurs from September to October.

== Taxonomy and naming ==
Pterostylis ovata was first formally described in 1986 by Mark Clements from a specimen grown in the Australian National Botanic Gardens from material collected near Lake Acraman. The description was published in the fourth edition of Flora of South Australia. The specific epithet (ovata) is a Latin word meaning "egg-shaped".

== Distribution and habitat ==
The Gawler Range rustyhood grows in open situations on granite and quartzite outcrops in the Gairdner-Torrens and Eyre Peninsula botanic regions of South Australia.
