= Lake Torrens National Park =

National park in South Australia

- IUCN category VI (protected area with sustainable use of natural resources)
- Location within South Australia
- Location: South Australia
- Nearest city: Woomera
- Coordinates: 31°02′40″S 137°51′35″E
- Area: 5,676.68 km^{2} (2,191.78 sq mi)
- Established: 19 December 1991
- Governing body: Department for Environment and Water
- Website: Official website

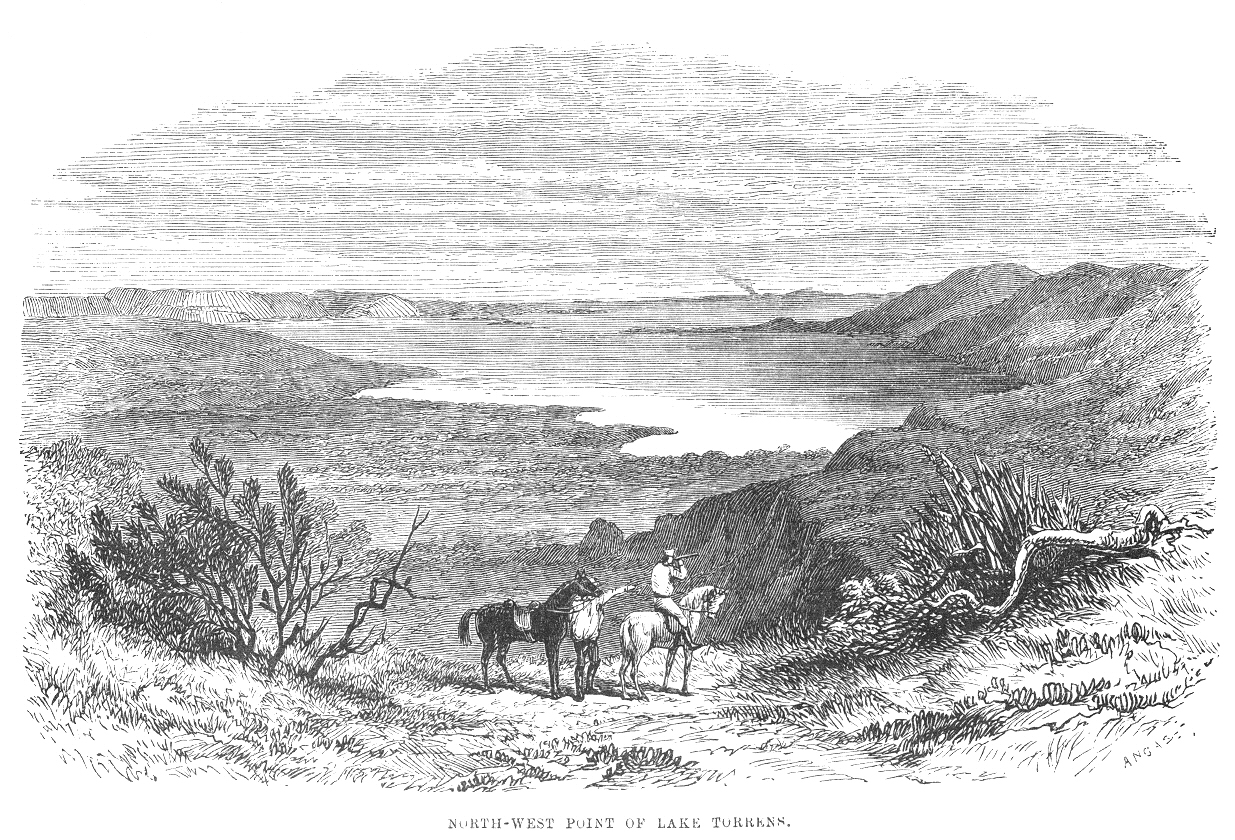
Drawing of the North West Point of Lake Torrens.

Lake Torrens National Park is a protected area located in South Australia about 345 kilometres (214 miles) north of the Adelaide city centre. Material published by the national park's manager reports that:

The stark wilderness and the salt lake that stretches 250km in length make up the Lake Torrens National Park. Lake Torrens is usually a dry salt flat. It has only been filled with water once in the past 150 years. Thunderstorms occasionally provide a small amount of water in the lake, when this occurs the area attracts a variety of birdlife. The park's landscape provides opportunities for photography and studying geology.

The national park is located on land which is listed in the Directory of Important Wetlands in Australia under the name Inland Saline Lakes. The national park is classified as an IUCN Category VI protected area.

== See also ==
- Protected areas of South Australia
