= Broken Hill Complex =

- Region
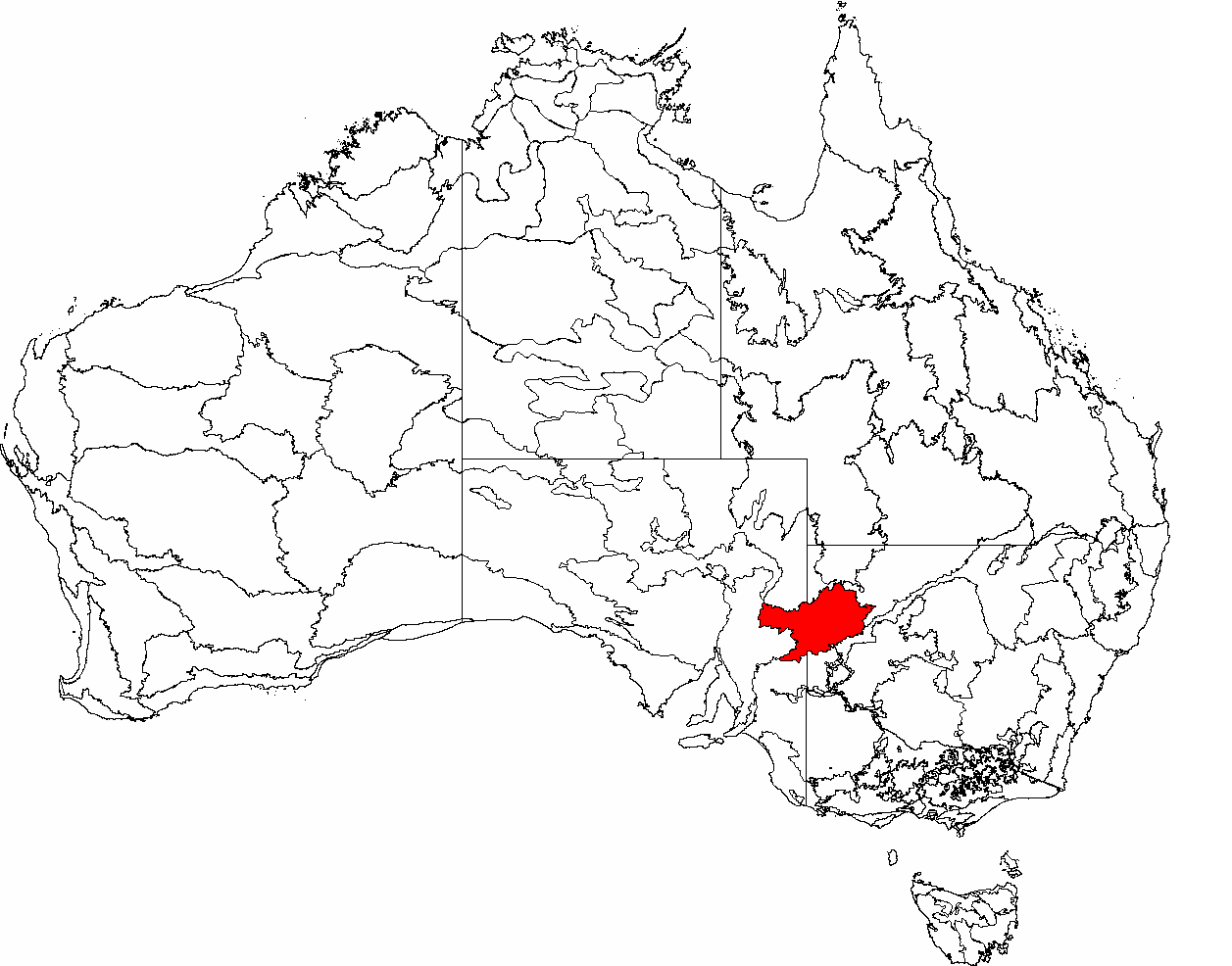
- The interim Australian bioregions, with the Broken Hill Complex in red
- Country: Australia
- State: Australia

Area
  - Total: 56,354.22 km^{2} (21,758.49 sq mi)
Regions around Broken Hill Complex
| SSD | CHC | MUL |
| FLB | BHC | DRP |
| FLB | MDD | DRP |

The Broken Hill Complex (code BHC), an interim Australian bioregion, is located in both New South Wales and South Australia, and comprises an area of 5,635,422 hectares (13,925,430 acres) of inland Australia.

IBRA 5.1 describes BHC as being:

Hills and colluvial fans on Proterozoic rocks; desert loams and red clays, lithosols and calcareous red earths; supporting chenopod shrublands Maireana spp. - Atriplex spp. shrublands, and mulga open shrublands Acacia aneura.

IBRA regions and subregions: IBRA7
| IBRA region / subregion | IBRA code | Area | States | Location in Australia |
|---|---|---|---|---|
| Broken Hill Complex | BHC | 5,635,422 hectares (13,925,430 acres) | SA / NSW | |
| Barrier Range | BHC01 | 1,802,996 ha (4,455,300 acres) | SA / NSW | |
| Mootwingee Downs | BHC02 | 630,694 ha (1,558,480 acres) | SA / NSW | |
| Scopes Range | BHC03 | 260,806 ha (644,470 acres) | SA / NSW | |
| Barrier Range Outwash | BHC04 | 1,954,973 ha (4,830,840 acres) | SA / NSW | |
| Bimbowrie | BHC05 | 279,258 ha (690,060 acres) | SA / NSW | |
| Curnamona | BHC06 | 706,696 ha (1,746,280 acres) | SA / NSW | |

== See also ==
- Geography of Australia
