= Simpson Strzelecki Dunefields =

Bioregion in Australia

Simpson Strzelecki Dunefields Australia
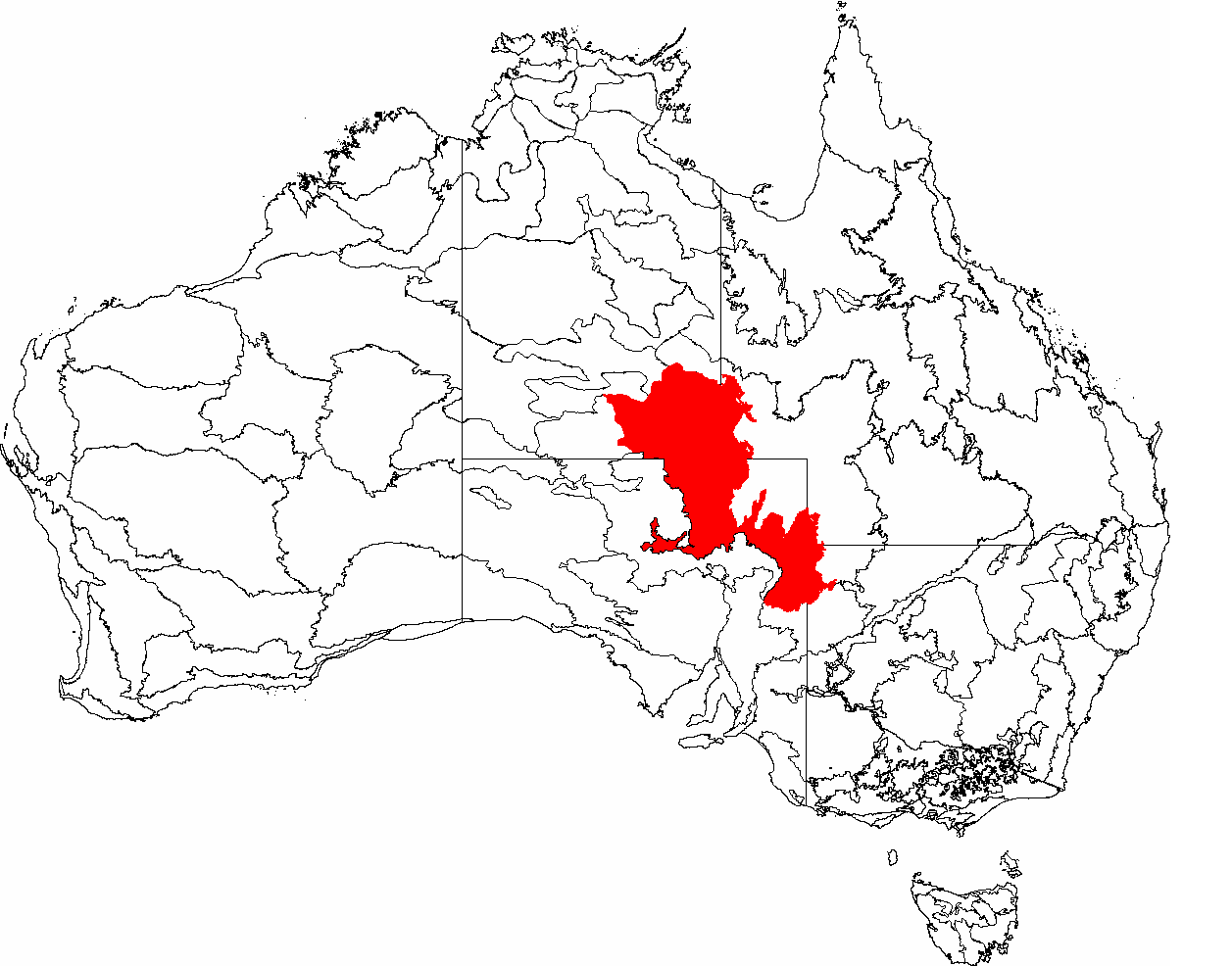
- The interim Australian bioregions, with Simpson Strzelecki Dunefields in red
- Area: 279,842.83 km^{2} (108,047.9 sq mi)
Localities around Simpson Strzelecki Dunefields:
MacDonnell Ranges	Burt Plain	Channel Country
Finke	Simpson Strzelecki Dunefields	Channel Country
Stony Plains	Broken Hill Complex	Broken Hill Complex

The Simpson Strzelecki Dunefields, an interim Australian bioregion, comprises 27,984,283 hectares (69,150,670 acres), and is part of four state/territories of Australia: the Northern Territory, South Australia, New South Wales and Queensland

The bioregion has the code SSD. There are five subregions.

IBRA regions and subregions: IBRA7
IBRA region / subregion	IBRA code	Area	States	Location in Australia
Simpson Strzelecki Dunefields	SSD	27,984,283 hectares (69,150,670 acres)	NSW, NT, Qld, SA	
Andado	SSD01	1,355,195 hectares (3,348,760 acres)	NSW, NT, Qld, SA	
Simpson Desert	SSD02	12,962,073 hectares (32,029,980 acres)	NSW, NT, Qld, SA	
Dieri	SSD03	5,152,029 hectares (12,730,940 acres)	NSW, NT, Qld, SA	
Warriner	SSD04	1,032,165 hectares (2,550,540 acres)	NSW, NT, Qld, SA	
Strzelecki Desert	SSD05	7,482,821 hectares (18,490,450 acres)	NSW, NT, Qld, SA	

== See also ==
- Geography of Australia
