= Finke bioregion =

Bioregion in South Australia and Northern Territory

Finke Australia
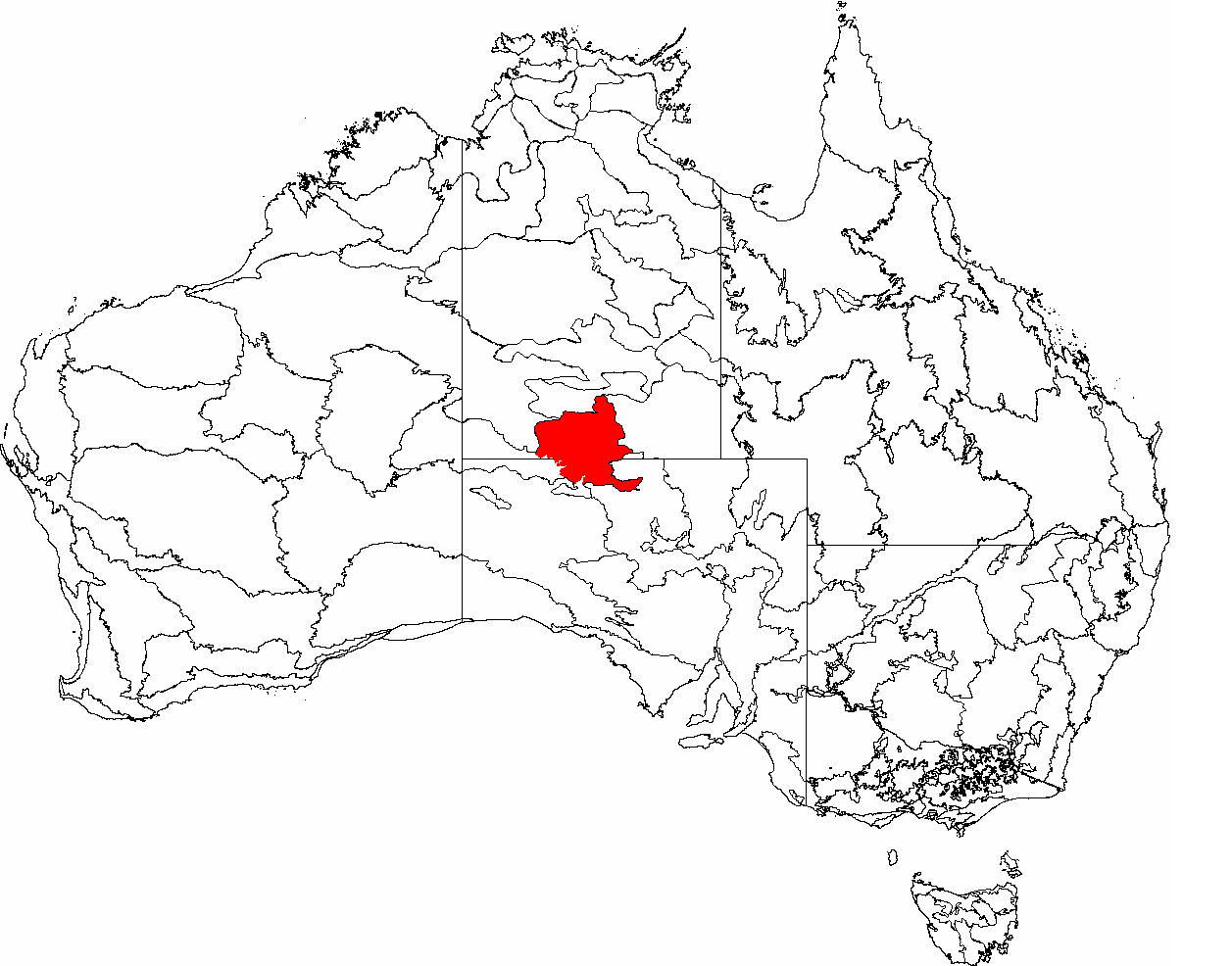
- The interim Australian bioregions, with Finke in red
- Area: 72,674.16 km^{2} (28,059.7 sq mi)
Localities around Finke:
| Great Sandy Desert | MacDonnell Ranges | Simpson Strzelecki Dunefields |
| Central Ranges | Finke | Simpson Strzelecki Dunefields |
| Central Ranges | Stony Plains | Stony Plains |

Finke, an interim Australian bioregion, comprises 7,267,416 hectares (17,958,180 acres), and is part of two state/territories of Australia: the Northern Territory and South Australia. It is part of the Central Ranges xeric scrub ecoregion.

The bioregion has the code FIN.

== Subregions ==
There are four subregions.

IBRA regions and subregions: IBRA7
| IBRA region / subregion | IBRA code | Area | States | Location in Australia |
|---|---|---|---|---|
| Finke | FIN | 7,267,416 hectares (17,958,180 acres) | NT / SA | |
| Henbury | FIN01 | 2,257,063 hectares (5,577,320 acres) | NT / SA | |
| Finke River | FIN02 | 1,601,516 hectares (3,957,430 acres) | NT / SA | |
| Tieyon | FIN03 | 2,505,610 hectares (6,191,500 acres) | NT / SA | |
| Pedirka | FIN04 | 903,228 hectares (2,231,920 acres) | NT / SA | |

== See also ==
- Geography of Australia
- Channel Country
