= Murray Darling Depression =

Terrestrial ecoregion in Australia

Murray Darling Depression Murray-Darling woodlands and mallee
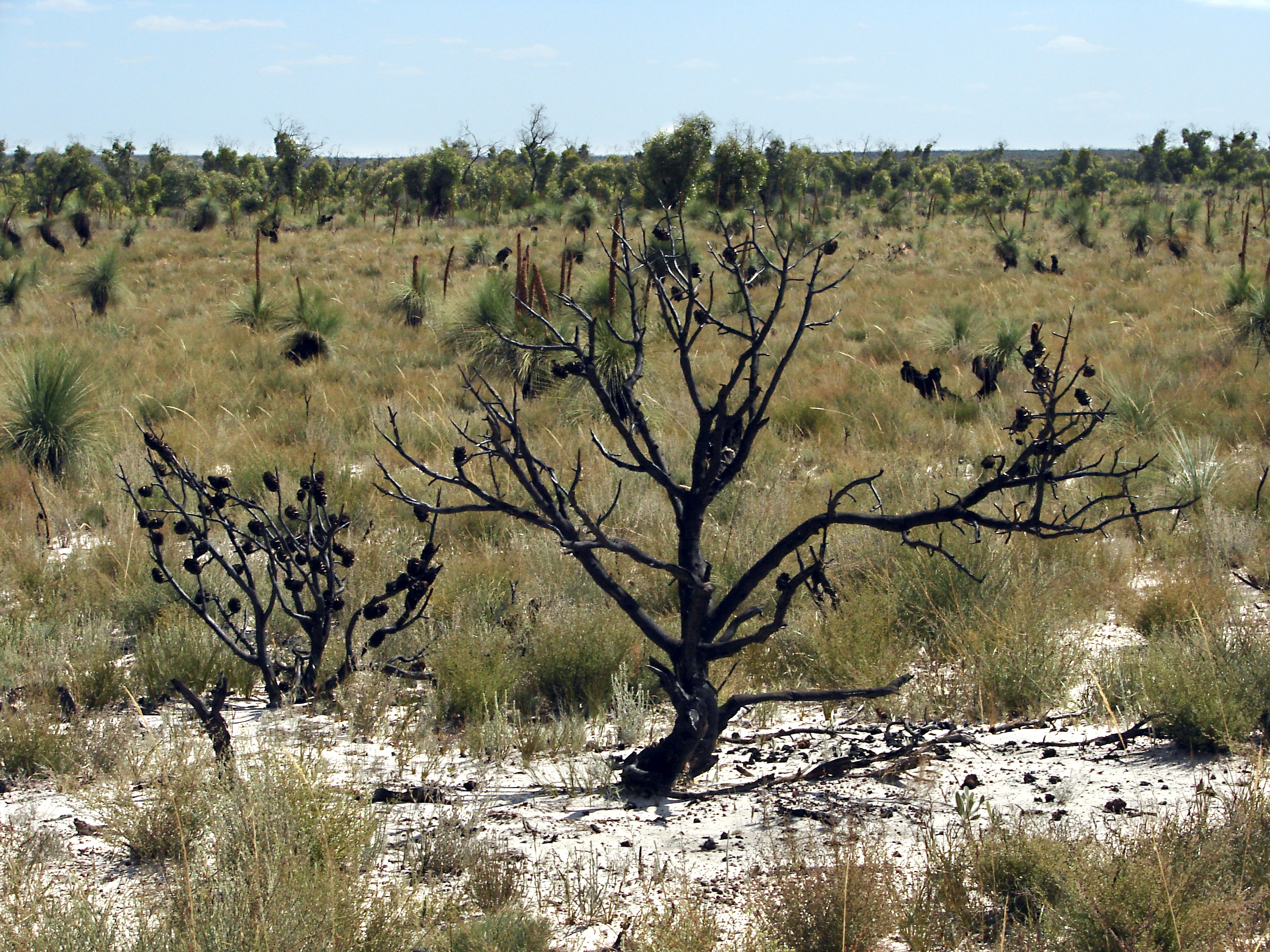
- Little Desert National Park

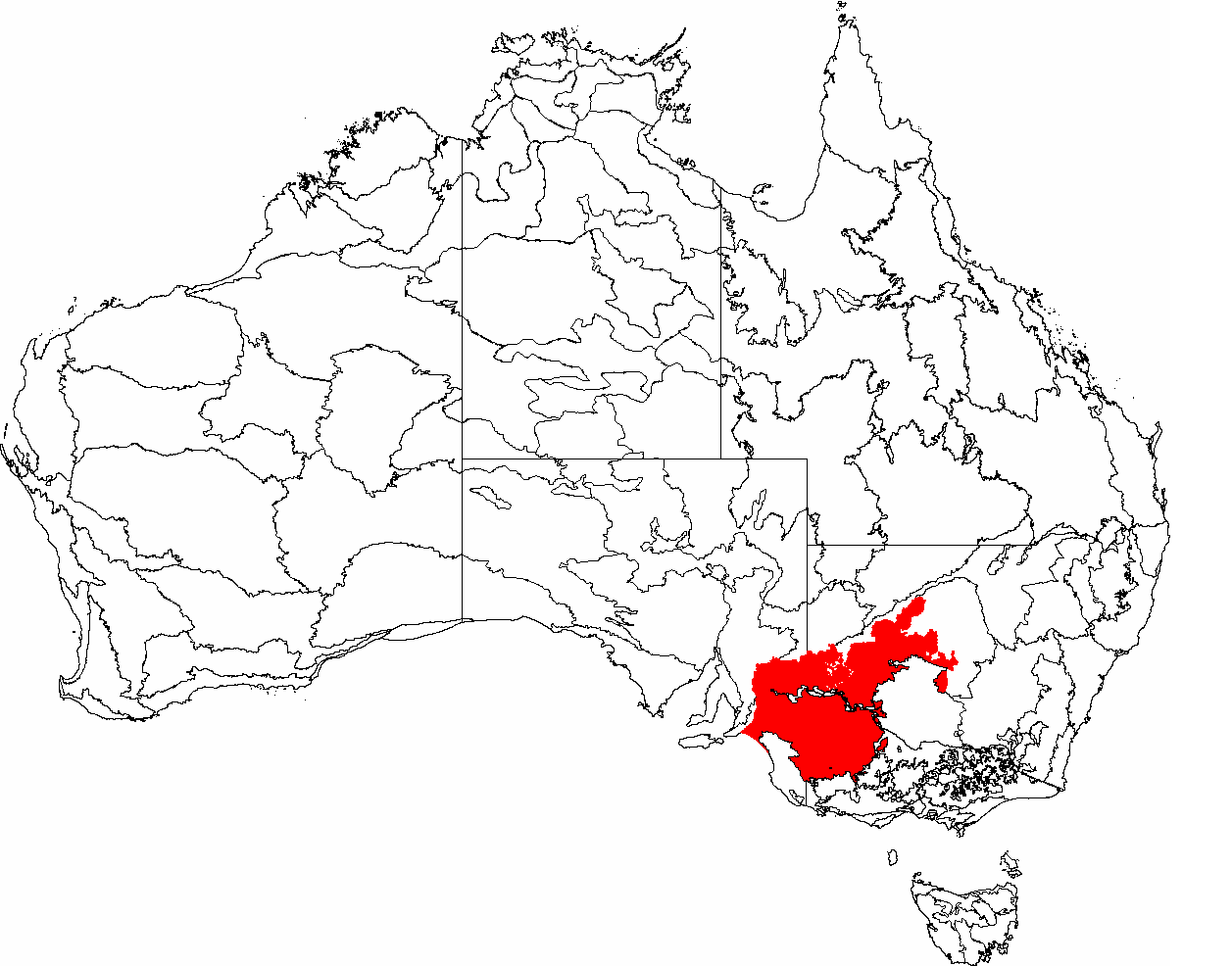
- The IBRA regions, with Murray Darling Depression in red

Ecology
- Realm: Australasian
- Biome: Mediterranean forests, woodlands, and scrub
- Borders: List: Mount Lofty woodlands; Naracoorte woodlands; Southeast Australia temperate forests; Southeast Australia temperate forests; Tirari-Sturt stony desert; Iron-grass Natural Temperate Grassland of South Australia

Geography
- Area: 197,900 km^{2} (76,400 mi^{2})
- Country: Australia
- States: New South Wales; South Australia, Victoria
- Coordinates: 35.2°S 141.6°E

Conservation
- Conservation status: Critical/endangered
- Protected: 31,000 km² (15%)

The Murray Darling Depression , also known as the Murray-Darling woodlands and mallee, is a 19,717,651 HA biogeographic region and an ecoregion in southeastern Australia consisting of a wooded plain through which flow two of Australia's biggest rivers, the Murray and the Darling. There are several modern human settlements in the bioregion including Ivanhoe and Manilla, and it also contains some of the oldest known human occupation sites in Australia.

== Environment ==
The plains have a dry Mediterranean climate with more rainfall (400mm per year) in the south than in the drier north (250mm). Fires are common in the hot dry summers.

=== Wetlands ===
The depression is home to numerous wetlands which are in turn home to many rare and endangered animal and plant species. Major wetlands within the bioregion include the Darling Anabranch Lakes, Conoble Lake, Lake Victoria, Willandra lakes, and Gunnaramby Swamp.

== Flora ==
The original vegetation of the basin was mallee eucalyptus woodlands with thicker black box (Eucalyptus largiflorens) and river red gum (Eucalyptus camaldulensis) woodland on riverbanks but most has been cleared for wheat farming and pasture. The flora of the plain need to be adapted to renew itself after the summer droughts and accompanying fires.

Austrostipa nullanulla, an endangered type of spear grass, has been identified as regionally endemic to the nearby areas. Several other rare plant species such as the Eriocaulon australasicum, and the Codonocarpus pyramidali are found here and considered to be relict populations.

== Fauna ==
Wildlife of the area includes large numbers of lizards, ants, and honeyeater birds (especially of the Lichenostomus and Meliphaga genera). Lizards include species of skink (especially of Ctenotus, Egernia, and Lerista genera). Ants include species of Iridomyrmex, carpenter ants, and Melophorus. Endangered species include the black-eared miner bird (Manorina melanotis) and the malleefowl (Leipoa ocellata).

== Geology ==
Shallow seas moving across the plains several times over the last 50-60 million years have left a unique geological footprint in the area and geological records have indicated that at one point the seas coast stretched as far inland as modern day Balranald. In areas where the surface geology interact with the saline water table unique salt basins have formed. Lunettes can be observed along the edges of various lakes and swamps throughout the bioregion, these lunettes have kept record of the surrounding environment and have been used as evidence to demonstrate climate change in the area.

== Aboriginal history ==
Evidence of early human habitation dating back to at least 50,000 years can be found in the Willandra lakes region and concealed within the sand dunes surrounding Lake Mungo.

== Threats and preservation ==
Although much of the plain was cleared in the past (missing reference), this is now carefully controlled (missing reference) and areas of protected natural vegetation remain, especially in the large Ngarkat Conservation Park - Big Desert Wilderness Park on the South Australia-Victoria border. Threats to habitats today come from introduced weeds, over-salination of rivers as water is drawn off for irrigation, over-use of fire to remove dry shrubs and prevent forest fires and overgrazing by introduced goats and rabbits.
