= Eyre Yorke Block =

Terrestrial ecoregion in Australia

Eyre Yorke Block Eyre and Yorke mallee
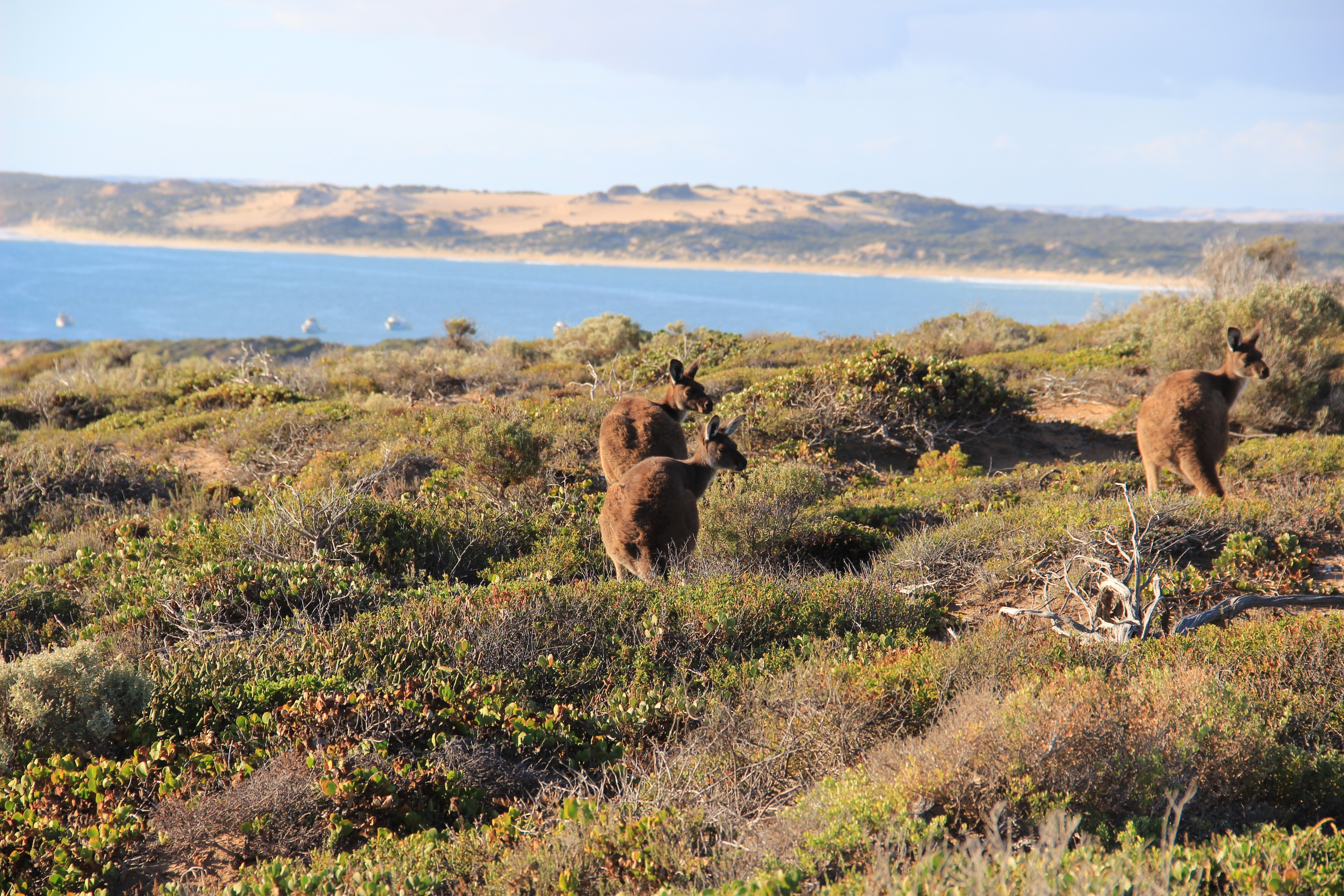
- Kangaroos at Innes National Park on the Yorke Peninsula

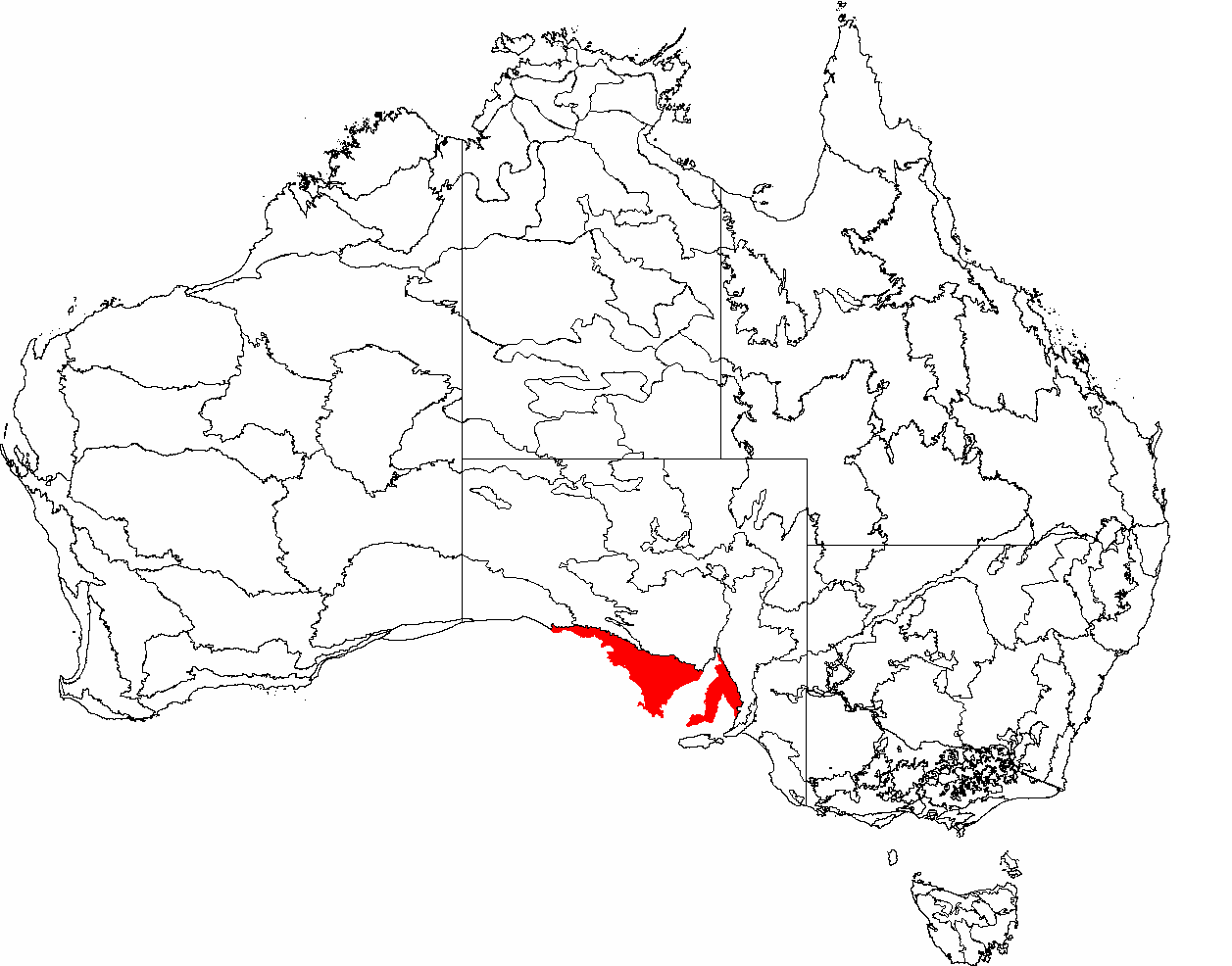
- Map of the Eyre Yorke Block, a.k.a. Eyre and Yorke mallee

Ecology
- Realm: Australasian
- Biome: Mediterranean forests, woodlands, and scrub
- Borders: List: Great Victoria Desert; Mount Lofty woodlands; Nullarbor Plains xeric shrublands; Tirari-Sturt stony desert; Temperate Grassland of South Australia

Geography
- Area: 60,195 km^{2} (23,241 mi^{2})
- Country: Australia
- States: South Australia
- Coordinates: 33°55′S 137°37′E

Conservation
- Conservation status: Critical/endangered
- Protected: 8,816 km^{2} (15%)

The Eyre Yorke Block, also known as the Eyre and Yorke mallee, is an interim Australian (IBRA) bioregion and a World Wildlife Fund ecoregion covering part of the Eyre Peninsula and all of Yorke Peninsula as well as land to its immediate east in South Australia.

== Location and description ==
The peninsulas consist of hilly country originally covered in eucalyptus woodland. However, it has good soil for farming, and the woodland has mostly been cleared for agriculture. The coast has a temperate climate with a wet winter (300mm to 600mm of rainfall per year).

=== Subregions ===
The IBRA identifies five subregions of the bioregion:

- Southern Yorke – 438,470 hectares (1,083,500 acres)
- St Vincent – 1,093,789 hectares (2,702,810 acres)
- Eyre Hills – 1,172,576 hectares (2,897,500 acres)
- Talia – 1,096,175 hectares (2,708,710 acres)
- Eyre Mallee – 2,319,398 hectares (5,731,360 acres)

== Flora ==
The original vegetation of these low hills was woodland of short trees with a shrubby undergrowth. The original woodland consisted mainly of a tea tree Melaleuca lanceolata and mallee box (Eucalyptus porosa), a mallee eucalyptus. Some woodlands are composed of Callitris preissi, Acacia ligulata, Geijera linearifolia], and E. diversifolia. The flora of the two peninsulas does differ, with the Eyre Peninsula flora having similarities with areas further west as well as number of endemic species, while the Yorke Peninsula has plants typical of areas to the east.

== Fauna ==
Mammals of the region include the western grey kangaroo and the southern hairy-nosed wombat, although many more (such as the tammar wallaby have become extinct on the two peninsulas since they have been cleared for farmland. Birds include the emu.

== Threats and preservation ==
Most of the area has been cleared for farmland resulting in reduced populations and local extinction of wildlife, especially on Yorke Peninsula. However, clearance has mostly ceased now and the northern areas of Eyre Peninsula in particular still have large areas of mallee woodland while the coastal dunes remain mostly unspoilt. Weeds, fertiliser and herbicide runoff are still threatening habitats. Protected areas include Innes National Park on Yorke Peninsula.

== Protected areas ==
15.24% of the ecoregion is in protected areas. They include:

- Adelaide International Bird Sanctuary National Park—Winaityinaityi Pangkara
- Buckleboo Conservation Reserve
- Coffin Bay National Park
- Cortlinye Conservation Reserve
- Cunyarie Conservation Reserve
- Gawler Ranges National Park
- Hambidge Wilderness Protection Area
- Hincks Wilderness Protection Area
- Innes National Park
- Lacroma Conservation Reserve
- Lincoln National Park
- Memory Cove Wilderness Protection Area
- Moongi Conservation Reserve
- Mootra Conservation Reserve
- Mount Remarkable National Park
- Pinkawillinie Reservoir Conservation Reserve
- Poolgarra Conservation Reserve
- Tola Conservation Reserve
- Wardang Island Indigenous Protected Area
- Yalata Indigenous Protected Area
