= Stony Plains =

Stony Plains Australia
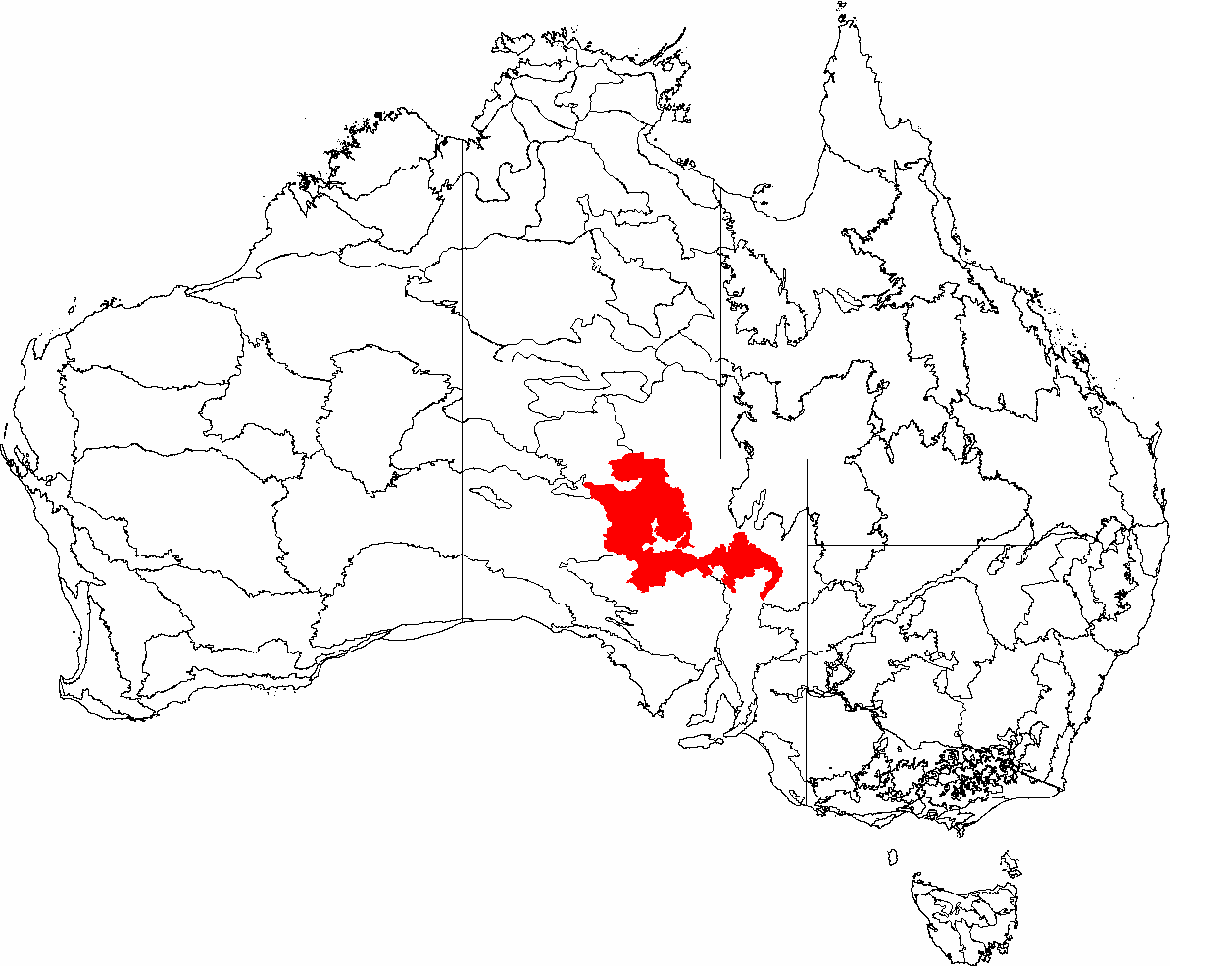
- The interim Australian bioregions, with Stony Plains in red
- Area: 131,663.72 km^{2} (50,835.6 sq mi)
Localities around Stony Plains:
Central Ranges	Finke	Simpson Strzelecki Dunefields
Great Victoria Desert	Stony Plains	Simpson Strzelecki Dunefields
Gawler	Gawler	Flinders Lofty Block

Stony Plains, an interim Australian bioregion, comprises 13,166,372 hectares (32,534,810 acres), and is part of two state/territories of Australia: the Northern Territory and South Australia.

The bioregion has the code STP. There are seven subregions.

IBRA regions and subregions: IBRA7
IBRA region / subregion	IBRA code	Area	States	Location in Australia
Stony Plains	STP	13,166,372 hectares (32,534,810 acres)	SA	
Breakaways	STP01	2,444,385 hectares (6,040,210 acres)	SA	
Oodnadatta	STP02	2,593,717 hectares (6,409,210 acres)	SA	
Murnpeowie	STP03	2,910,385 hectares (7,191,720 acres)	SA	
Peake-Dennison Inlier	STP04	158,623 hectares (391,970 acres)	SA	
Macumba	STP05	693,282 hectares (1,713,140 acres)	SA	
Witjira	STP06	1,677,111 hectares (4,144,230 acres)	SA	
Baltana	STP07	2,688,870 hectares (6,644,300 acres)	SA	

== See also ==
- Geography of Australia
