= Southwest Australia =

Biogeographic region of Western Australia

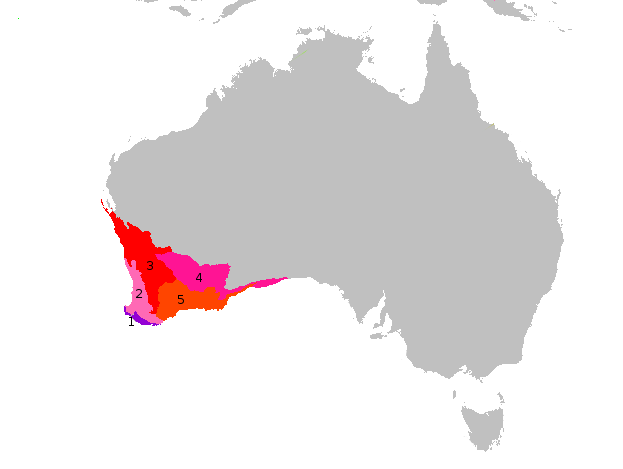
Ecoregions of Southwest Australia, as defined by the WWF. 1. Jarrah-Karri forest and shrublands; 2. Southwest Australia woodlands and Swan Coastal Plain; 3. Southwest Australia savanna; 4. Coolgardie woodlands; 5. Esperance mallee.

Southwest Australia is a biogeographic region in Western Australia. It includes the Mediterranean-climate area of southwestern Australia, which is home to a diverse and distinctive flora and fauna.

The region is also known as the Southwest Australia Global Diversity Hotspot.

== Geography ==
The region includes the Mediterranean forests, woodlands, and scrub ecoregions of Western Australia. The region covers 356,717 km^{2}, consisting of a broad coastal plain 20–120 kilometres wide, transitioning to gently undulating uplands made up of weathered granite, gneiss and laterite. Bluff Knoll in the Stirling Range is the highest peak in the region, at 1,099 metres (3,606 ft) elevation.

Desert and xeric shrublands lie to the north and east across the centre of Australia, separating Southwest Australia from the other Mediterranean and humid-climate regions of the continent.

== Climate ==
The region has a wet-winter, dry-summer Mediterranean climate, one of five such regions in the world. During the winter months, westerly winds bring cool weather, clouds, and rainfall to Southwest Australia. In the summer months, the lower-latitude anticyclonic belt, with generally dry easterly winds, moves southwards, increasing temperatures and decreasing rainfall. Tropical cyclones, off the shore of northern Western Australia during the December-to-March northern wet season, occasionally reach as far south as Perth before moving inland, bringing floods and damaging winds to the west coast and rain to the dry interior.

Rainfall generally decreases from south to north, and with distance from the coast. The highest rainfall is typically in the Karri Forest Region between Pemberton and Walpole, up to 1,400 mm (55 inches) annually.

The region has been experiencing the effects of human induced climate change. Average annual rainfall has declined as much as 20% since the 1970s, declining by 10–20 millimetres each decade. Summertime maximum temperatures have increased by 0.1º to 0.3º C per decade, and the average number of days per year over 40º C in Perth has doubled over the last century. Lower rainfall and higher temperatures have reduced stream flow and inflow into drinking water and irrigation catchments since the 1960s. The summer of 2021/22 was the hottest on record.

== Flora ==
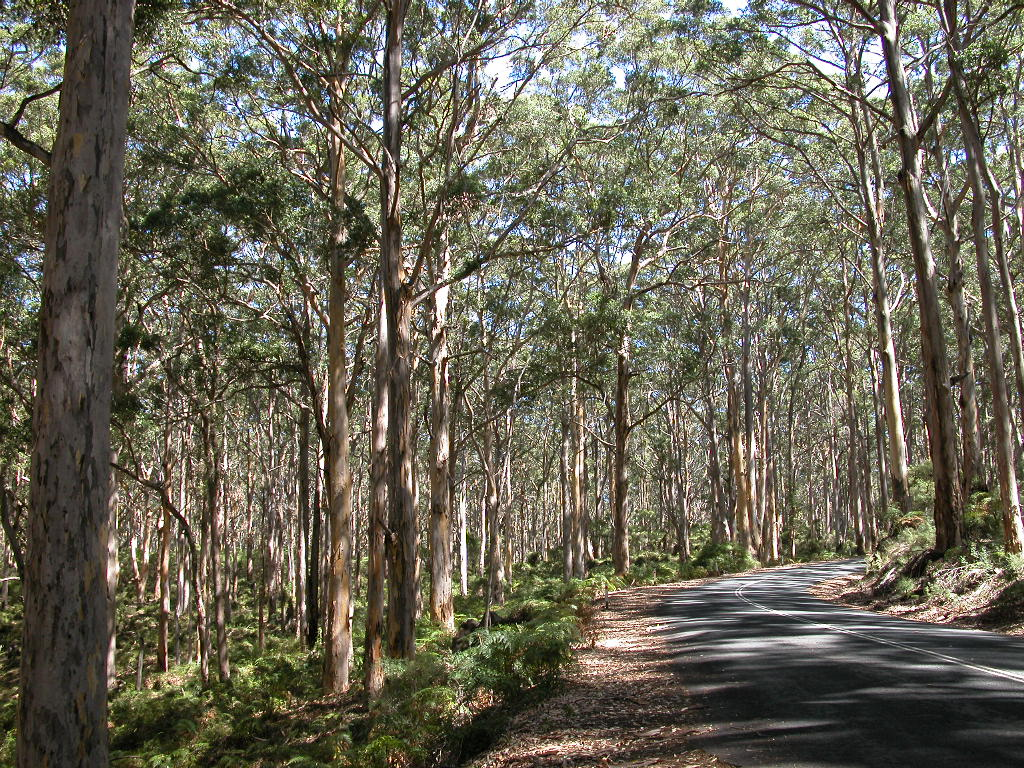
Karri forest near Pemberton

Southwest Australia is recognised as a floristic province.

Vegetation in the region is mainly woody, including forests, woodlands, shrublands, and heathlands, but no grasslands. Predominant vegetation types are Eucalyptus woodlands, eucalyptus-dominated mallee shrublands, and kwongan shrublands and heathlands, which correspond to the chaparral, matorral, maquis, and fynbos shrublands found in other Mediterranean-type regions. The region has generally nutrient-poor sandy or lateritic soils, which has encouraged rich speciation of plants adapted to specific ecological niches. The region hosts a great diversity of endemic species, notably among the protea family (Proteaceae).

Southwest Australia is home to many endemic carnivorous plants, including more than half the world's species of sundews (Drosera), the bladderwort subgenus Polypompholyx, the Byblis gigantea complex of rainbow plants (composed of two species, Byblis lamellata and B. gigantea), and the pitcher plant Cephalotus follicularis, sole species in the plant family Cephalotaceae.

== Fauna ==
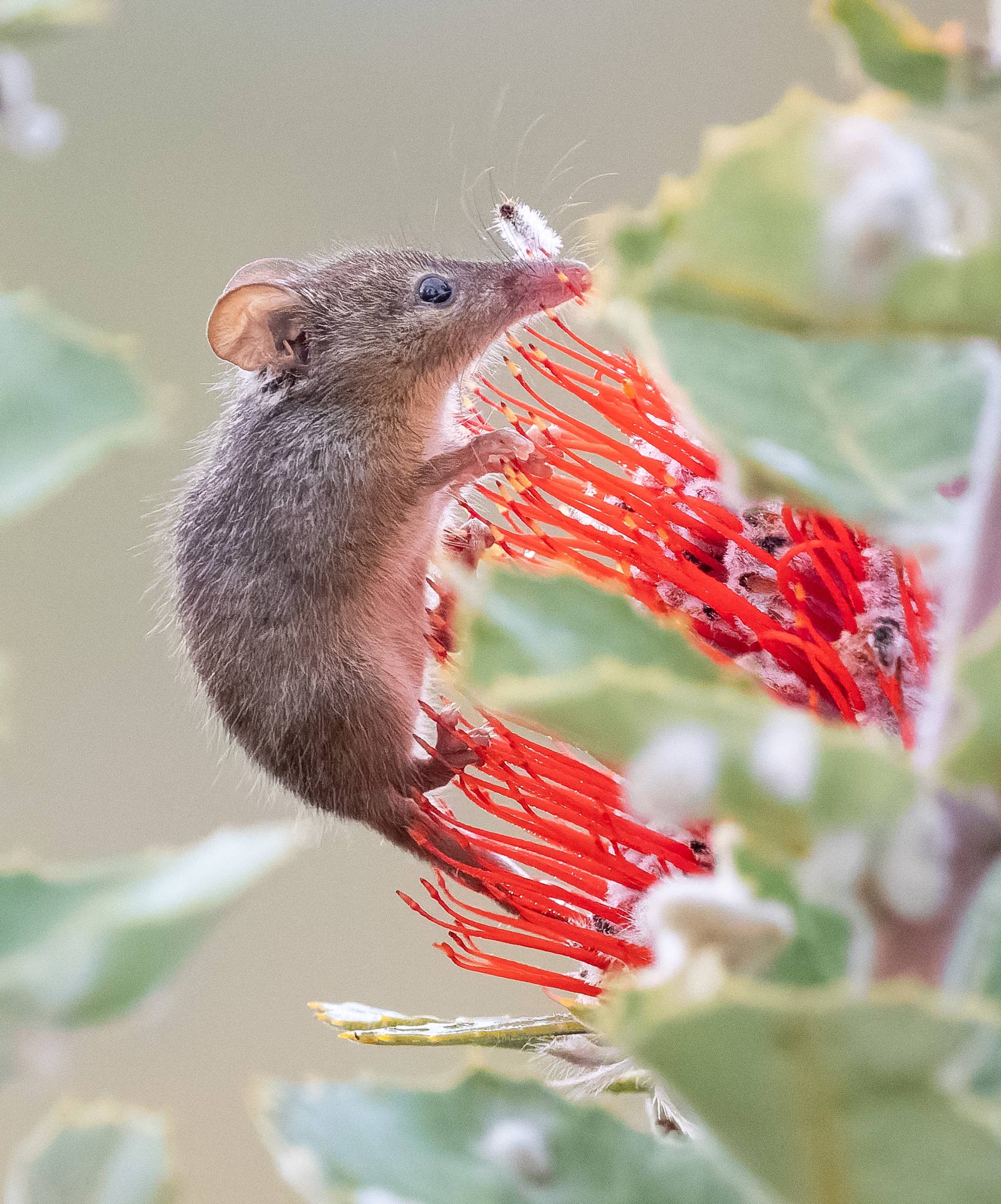
Honey possum (Tarsipes rostratus)

The honey possum (Tarsipes rostratus) is a tiny marsupial endemic to Southwest Australia that feeds on nectar and pollen, and is an important pollinator for several southwestern plants including Banksia attenuata, Banksia coccinea, and Adenanthos cuneatus. Other mammals endemic to Southwest Australia are the western brush wallaby (Macropus irma) and the quokka (Setonix brachyurus).

Southwest Australia is an Endemic Bird Area, with several endemic species of birds including the long-billed black cockatoo (Zanda baudinii), western corella (Cacatua pastinator), noisy scrubbird (Atrichornis clamosus), red-winged fairywren (Malurus elegans), western bristlebird (Dasyornis longirostris), black-throated whipbird (Psophodes nigrogularis), white-breasted robin (Eopsaltria georgianus), and red-eared firetail (Stagonopleura oculata). The western rufous bristlebird (Dasyornis broadbenti litoralis), an endemic subspecies of rufous bristlebird, is now extinct.

== Ecoregions ==
The World Wide Fund for Nature and Interim Biogeographic Regionalisation for Australia (IBRA) divide the region into six ecoregions and ten biogeographic regions:

- Coolgardie woodlands (IBRA Coolgardie and Hampton)
- Esperance mallee (IBRA Esperance Plains and Mallee)
- Jarrah-Karri forest and shrublands (IBRA Warren)
- Southwest Australia savanna (IBRA Geraldton Sandplains, Avon Wheatbelt, and Yalgoo)
- Southwest Australia woodlands (IBRA Jarrah Forest)
- Swan Coastal Plain scrub and woodlands (IBRA Swan Coastal Plain)

The transitional Coolgardie, Hampton, and Yalgoo bioregions are generally drier than the rest of the Southwest. They considered part of Southwest Australia by the WWF, but are considered part of the Central Australian or Eremaean Region by the Western Australian Herbarium.

== Freshwater ==
Southwest Australia has several permanent rivers and streams, including the Swan–Avon system, the Blackwood River, and other short rivers. The perennial rivers drain from the interior plateau and Darling Range across the coastal plain. Their flow is strongly seasonal, corresponding to the Southwest's wet winter–dry summer weather pattern. The perennial streams extend from east of Esperance on the south coast to the Arrowsmith River north of Perth, most often in areas with 700 mm or more of annual rainfall.

Arid regions separate Southwest Australia's freshwater habitats from Australia's other year-round rivers. As with its terrestrial flora, Southwest Australia's Mediterranean climate and biogeographic isolation has given rise to a distinct freshwater ecoregion with many endemic species.

There are fifteen freshwater fish species, including nine exclusively freshwater species, three estuarine species adapted to brackish water, and three diadromous species that spend part of their life-cycle in the sea. The exclusively freshwater species are endemic to Southwest Australia, as are two estuarine species. The salamanderfish (Lepidogalaxias salamandroides) is the sole species in the endemic family Lepidogalaxiidae. Salamanderfish can aestivate during the summer months, an adaptation to the region's dry summers. Other endemic species are the nightfish (Bostockia porosa), western mud minnow (Galaxiella munda), black-stripe minnow (Galaxiella nigrostriata), Balston’s pygmy perch (Nannatherina balstoni), western pygmy perch (Nannoperca vittata), and western galaxias (Galaxias occidentalis).

Southwest Australian varieties of the diadromous common galaxias (Galaxias maculatus) and spotted galaxias (Galaxias truttaceus) have adapted so they can live their life-cycle and reproduce in fresh water.

The southwestern snake-necked turtle (Chelodina colliei) and western swamp turtle (Pseudemydura umbrina) are aquatic species endemic to Southwest Australia.

== History ==
The first evidence of human habitation of the region was 50,000 years ago at Devil's Lair by ancestors of today's Aboriginal people.

Aboriginal populations were generally denser on the coastal plain and along the coastal forest edge, and in the interior woodlands and shrublands, particularly near permanent streams and river estuaries. Population was sparse in the forested areas of the south. Offshore islands were likely uninhabited.

The Aboriginal inhabitants deliberately set fires to manage the land and vegetation. Evidence from lake and estuarine sediments and firsthand accounts suggest that fire intervals in well-settled areas were frequent – from one to ten years – compared to unoccupied forests and offshore islands, where fire intervals were 30 to 100 or more years. Frequent burning reduced tree cover and encouraged the growth of grasses, herbs, and low shrubs, fostering open woodlands and savannas and limiting areas of dense forest and thicket.

Noongar peoples inhabited the western and southern portions of the region. The Noongar comprised 14 groups, which spoke distinct but mutually-intelligible languages.

The Nyoongar seasonal calendar includes six different seasons in a yearly cycle. These are Birak, Bunuru, Djeran, Makuru, Djilba and Kambarang. Each of the six seasons represents and explains the seasonal changes seen annually. The flowering of many different plants, the hibernation of reptiles and the moulting of swans are all helpful indicators that the seasons are changing.

The first permanent European settlement in the region was in 1826 near present-day Albany. European settlers mostly dispossessed the Aboriginal inhabitants, and established extensive agriculture, including wheat, barley, canola, lupins, and oats. They also introduced sheep and cattle to the region. European settlement also changed the fire regime established by the Aboriginal inhabitants of the land.

== Protected areas ==
109,445 km^{2}, or 22.13%, of Southwest Australia's land area is in protected areas.

Ecoregion	Area km^{2}	Area protected km^{2}	% protected
Coolgardie woodlands	137,681	44,504.01	32.32%
Esperance mallee	115,773	37,718.84	32.58%
Jarrah-Karri forest and shrublands	10,467	4,759.76	45.47%
Southwest Australia savanna	169,271	14,516.68	8.58%
Southwest Australia woodlands	46,150	5,933.04	12.86%
Swan Coastal Plain scrub and woodlands	15,259	2,012.81	13.19%
Total	494,601	109,445.15	22.13%

== See also ==
- South West, Western Australia
- South West Seismic Zone
