= Coolgardie (disambiguation) =

Coolgardie may refer to:

- Coolgardie, Western Australia
- Shire of Coolgardie
- Coolgardie bioregion
- Coolgardie woodlands
