= Western Australian mulga shrublands =

Terrestrial ecoregion in Western Australia

Western Australian Mulga shrublands
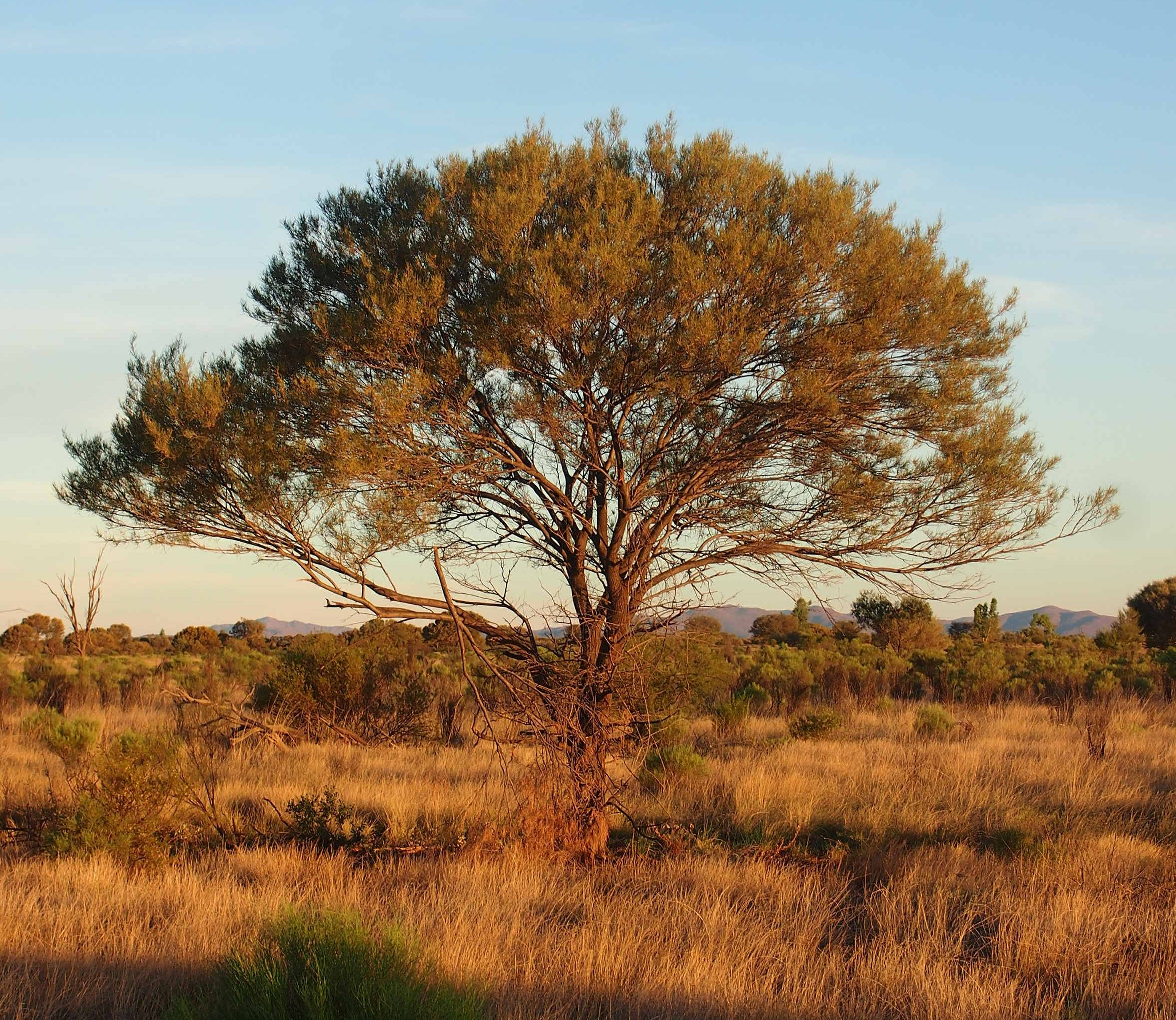
- Mulga tree (Acacia aneura) in mulga shrubland.

- Location of the Western Australian Mulga shrublands ecoregion.

Ecology
- Realm: Australasian
- Biome: deserts and xeric shrublands
- Borders: List: Carnarvon xeric shrublands; Coolgardie woodlands; Gibson desert; Great Sandy-Tanami desert; Pilbara shrublands; Southwest Australia savanna

Geography
- Area: 461,958 km^{2} (178,363 sq mi)
- Country: Australia
- State: Western Australia
- Coordinates: 26.5°S 119.25°E

Conservation
- Conservation status: Vulnerable
- Protected: 4.53%

The Western Australian Mulga shrublands is a deserts and xeric shrublands ecoregion of inland Western Australia. It is one of Australia's two mulga ecoregions, characterized by dry woodlands of mulga trees (Acacia aneura and related species) interspersed with areas of grassland and scrub.

== Location and description ==
This is a hot, dry area with little rainfall.

The region consists of the Gascoyne and Murchison bioregions of the Interim Biogeographic Regionalisation for Australia (IBRA).

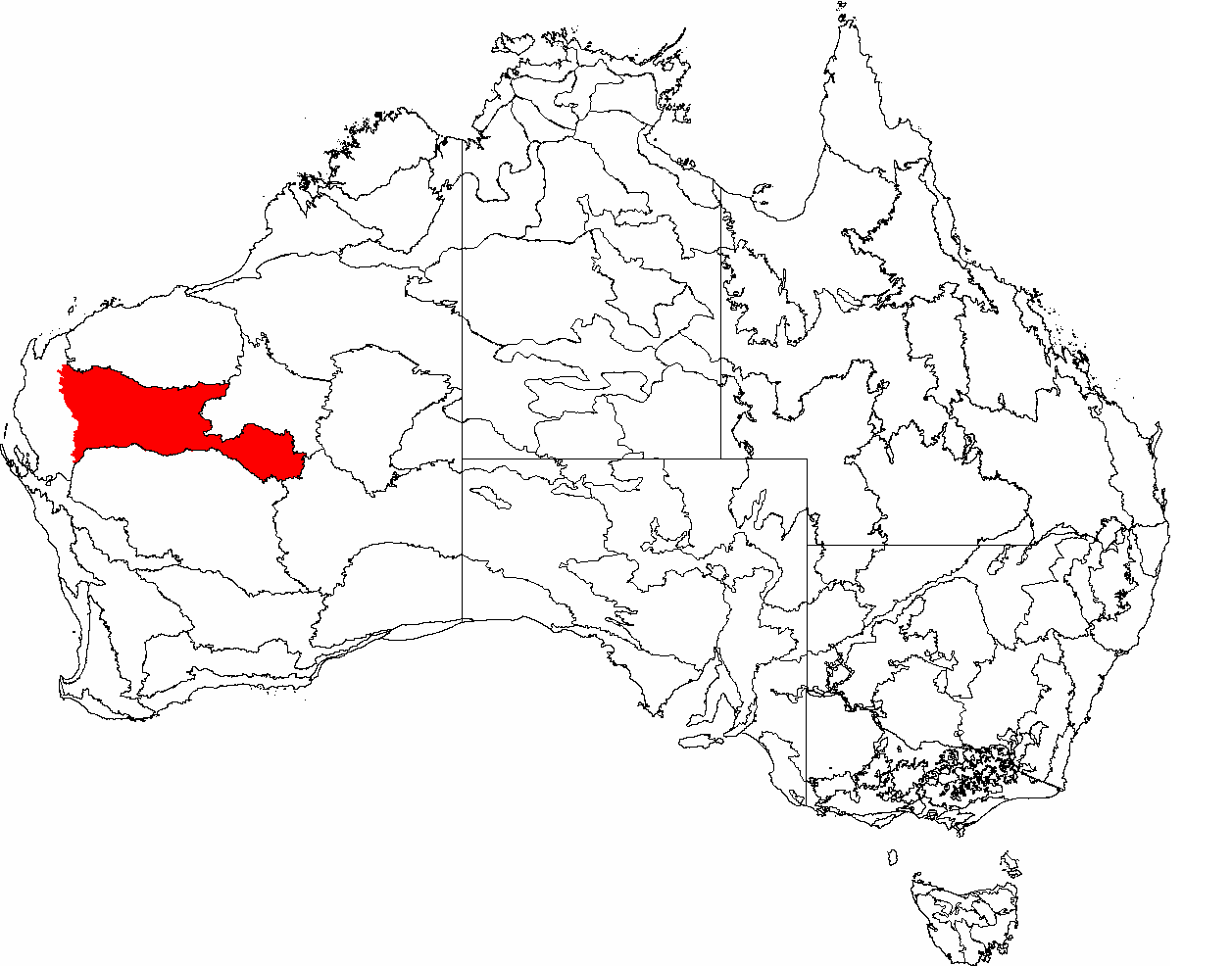
The IBRA regions, with Gascoyne in red

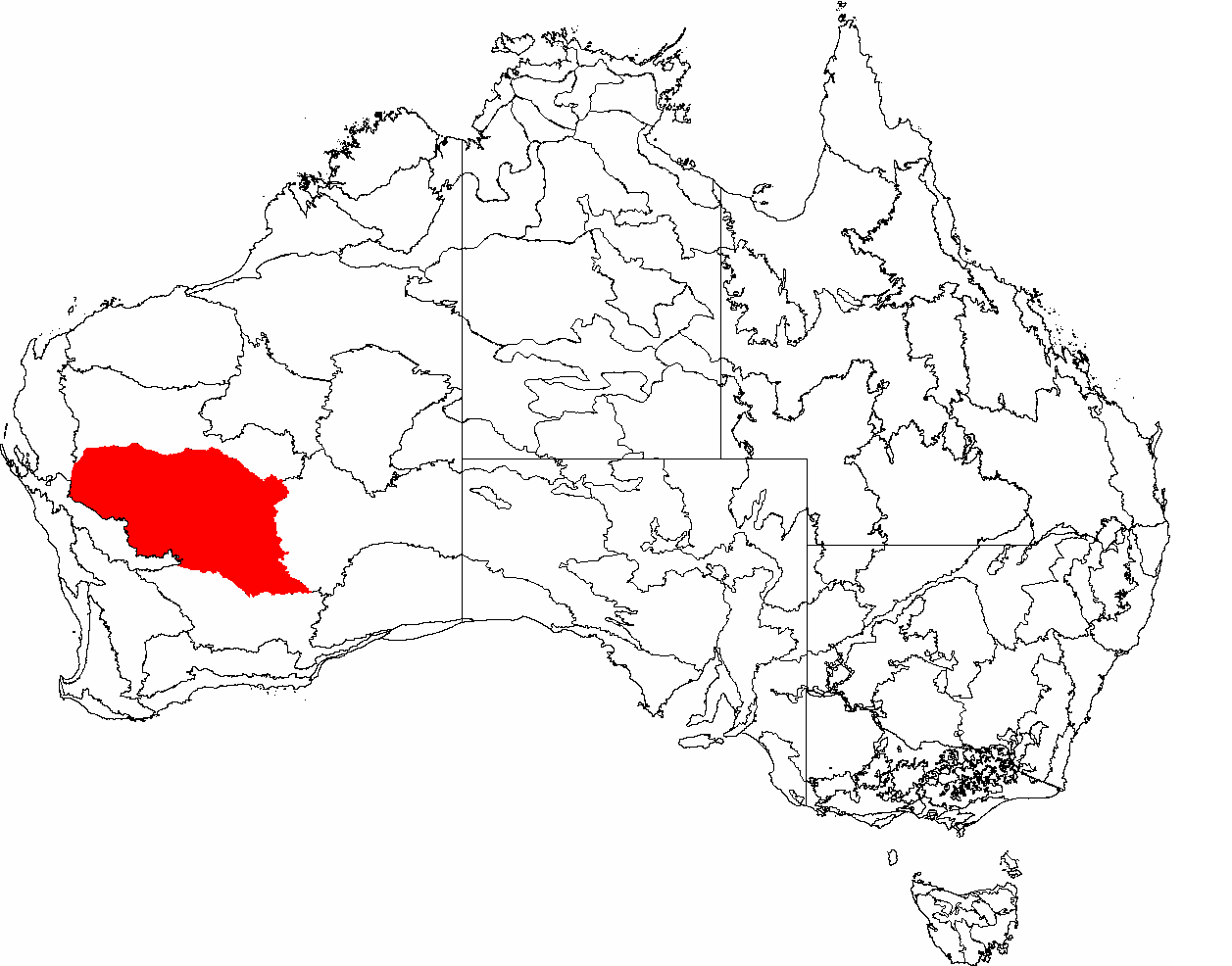
The IBRA regions, with Murchison in red

== Flora and fauna ==
The predominant vegetation is mulga trees, a type of acacia adapted to the hot, dry climate by means of long tap roots. In some areas the mulga trees are surrounded by Eriachne grassland.

Wildlife of the region includes red kangaroos and birds such as emus, Australian bustards and honeyeaters.

Most of the area is uninhabited but there is some mining activity and some sheep grazing, both of which cause damage to native habitats.

== Protected areas ==
4.53% of the ecoregion is in protected areas. Protected areas in the ecoregion include:

- Barlee Range Nature Reserve
- Birriliburu Indigenous Protected Area
- Bullock Holes Timber Reserve
- Collier Range National Park
- De La Poer Range Nature Reserve
- Goongarrie National Park
- Matuwa and Kurrara-Kurrara Indigenous Protected Area
- Mount Augustus National Park
- Queen Victoria Spring Nature Reserve
- Toolonga Nature Reserve
- Unnamed WA46847 Nature Reserve
- Wanjarri Nature Reserve
