= Grevillea saxicola =

Conservation status
- Priority Three — Poorly Known Taxa (DEC)

Scientific classification
- Kingdom: Plantae
- Clade: Tracheophytes
- Clade: Angiosperms
- Clade: Eudicots
- Order: Proteales
- Family: Proteaceae
- Genus: Grevillea
- Species: G. saxicola

Binomial name
- Grevillea saxicola S.J.Dillon

Species of plant endemic to Australia

Grevillea saxicola is a species of flowering plant in the family Proteaceae and is endemic to the Pilbara region of Western Australia. It is a shrub or small tree usually with pinnatisect leaves with linear lobes, and cylindrical clusters of cream-coloured to pale yellow flowers.

== Description ==
Grevillea saxicola is a shrub or small tree that typically grows to a height of 2.5–7 m (8 ft 2 in – 23 ft 0 in) and has rough, grey-black bark. Its leaves are pinnatisect with 2 to 8 linear lobes, sometimes linear leaves, the lobes or linear leaves 70–270 mm (2.8–10.6 in) long and 0.8–1.4 mm (0.031–0.055 in) wide. The flowers are arranged in sometimes branched clusters, each branch cylindrical on a rachis 3–12 mm (0.12–0.47 in) long with white and rust-coloured hairs pressed against the surface. The flowers are cream-coloured to pale yellow, the pistil 5.7–10 mm (0.22–0.39 in) long. Flowering occurs from late spring to early autumn and the fruit is a more or less glabrous, elliptic to oval follicle 10.5–15.2 mm (0.41–0.60 in) long.

== Taxonomy ==
Grevillea saxicola was first formally described in 2014 by Stephen J. Dillon in the journal Nuytsia from specimens collected near Tom Price in 2012. The specific epithet (saxicola) means "a dweller among rocks".

== Distribution and habitat ==
This grevillea occurs in the arid Pilbara shrublands bioregion of Western Australia, from 40 km east of Paraburdoo to 50 km west-north-west of Newman. It grows on the orange-red-brown loam soils of scree slopes and ridges of banded iron formations, as well as in mulga woodlands.

== Conservation status ==
Grevillea saxicola is listed as "Priority Three" by the Government of Western Australia Department of Biodiversity, Conservation and Attractions, meaning that it is poorly known and known from only a few locations but is not under imminent threat.
