= Acacia petricola =

Mount Augustus rock wattle

Conservation status
- Priority Two — Poorly Known Taxa (DEC)

Scientific classification
- Kingdom: Plantae
- Clade: Tracheophytes
- Clade: Angiosperms
- Clade: Eudicots
- Clade: Rosids
- Order: Fabales
- Family: Fabaceae
- Subfamily: Caesalpinioideae
- Clade: Mimosoid clade
- Genus: Acacia
- Species: A. petricola

Binomial name
- Acacia petricola Maslin

Species of legume

Acacia petricola is a shrub of the genus Acacia, also known as Mount Augustus rock wattle, that is native to Western Australia and is found in a small area between the Kennedy Range National Park and Collier Range National Park.

== See also ==
- List of Acacia species
