= Coolgardie woodlands =

Terrestrial ecoregion in Western Australia

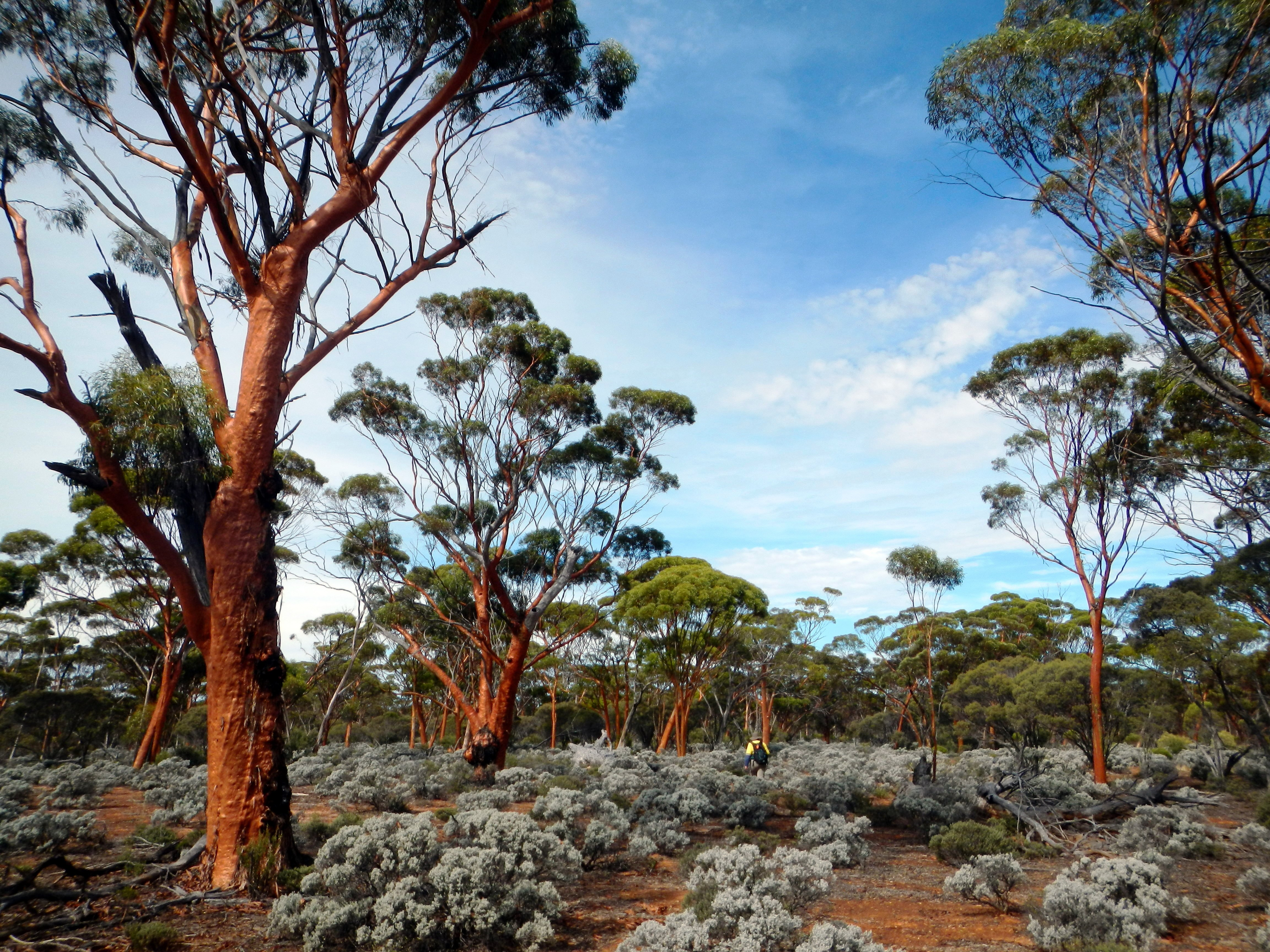
- Eucalyptus woodlands near Norseman, Western Australia

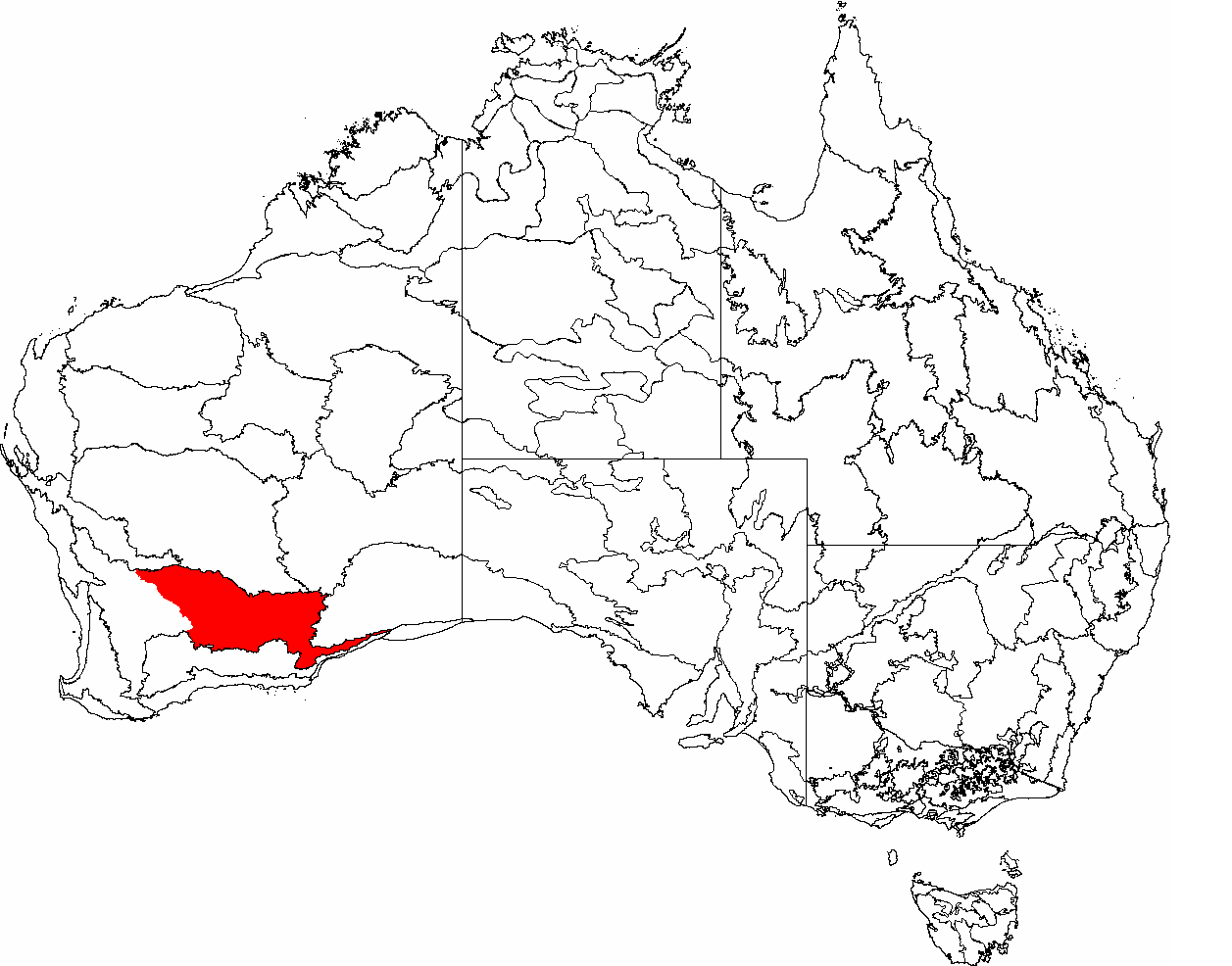
- Ecoregion territory (in red)

Ecology
- Realm: Australasian
- Biome: Mediterranean forests, woodlands, and scrub
- Borders: List: Esperance mallee; Great Victoria Desert; Nullarbor Plains xeric shrublands; Southeast Australia temperate forests; Western Australian mulga shrublands

Geography
- Area: 140,001 km^{2} (54,055 sq mi)
- Country: Australia
- States: Western Australia
- Coordinates: 31.77°S 121.74°E

Conservation
- Conservation status: Critical/endangered
- Protected: 16,323 km^{2} (12%)

The Coolgardie woodlands is an ecoregion in southern Western Australia. The predominant vegetation is woodlands and mallee scrub. The ecoregion is a transitional zone between the Mediterranean-climate forests, woodlands, and shrublands of Southwest Australia and the deserts and dry scrublands of the Australian interior.

== Location and description ==
The Coolgardie woodlands is part of the Mediterranean-climate Southwest Australia biogeographic region, whose forests, woodlands, and shrublands are globally noteworthy for their diversity of plant species.

The Coolgardie woodlands ecoregion consists of two IBRA regions – Coolgardie and the smaller Hampton bioregion. Coolgardie bioregion is bounded on the south and west by Mediterranean-climate ecoregions, the coastal Esperance mallee ecoregion to the south, and the Southwest Australia savanna ecoregion to the west. The Coolgardie woodlands' northern boundary is the Mulga-eucalypt line, which marks the boundary between eucalypt-dominated woodlands of Southwest Australia and the drier Mulga (Acacia-dominated) woodlands of Australia's interior. The Western Australian mulga shrublands, Great Victoria Desert, and Nullarbor Plains xeric shrublands ecoregions lie to the north.

The Hampton region is coastal, lying southeast of the Coolgardie region on the shore of the Great Australian Bight. It is bounded on the north and east by the Nullarbor Plains xeric shrublands.

== Flora ==
The ecoregion is home to several plant communities, including eucalyptus woodlands and shrublands of mallee and acacia. Woodlands of Salmon gum (Eucalyptus salmonophloia) and gimlet (Eucalyptus salubris) are common in central Coolgardie, generally on rolling plains and river valleys on red loam soils over red clay. Salmon gums reach 15-20 meters in height, and gimlet a height of 8 to 12 meters. The woodlands are open and irregular, and with an understory of low shrubs (including Maireana sedifolia and Atriplex spp.), herbs, and grasses.

== Protected areas ==
A 2017 assessment found that 16,323 km^{2}, or 12%, of the ecoregion is in protected areas – 14,731 km^{2} (11%) of the Coolgardie region and 1,592 km^{2} (15%) of the Hampton region. Protected areas in the Coolgardie region include Karroun Hill Nature Reserve in the northwestern corner, Mount Manning Nature Reserve, Jilbadji Nature Reserve, and Goldfields Woodlands National Park in western Coolgardie, and Dundas Nature Reserve which extends south into the Esperance mallee. Ngadju Indigenous Protected Area was established in 2020, and protects extensive areas of woodland.

The coastal Nuytsland Nature Reserve covers the western portion of the Hampton region, and Nullarbor National Park covers its easternmost portion.

== See also ==
- Great Western Woodlands
