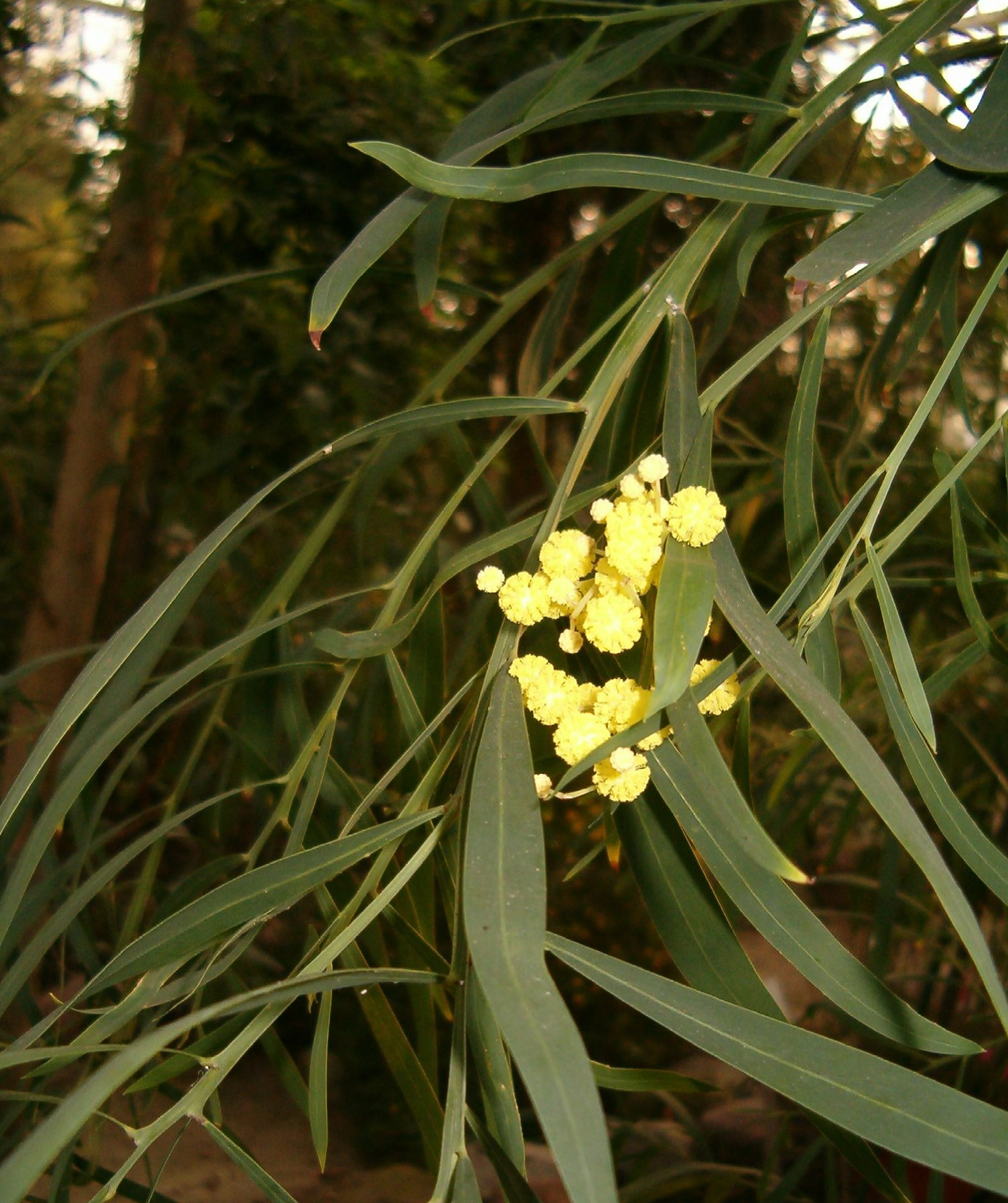

Scientific classification
- Kingdom: Plantae
- Clade: Tracheophytes
- Clade: Angiosperms
- Clade: Eudicots
- Clade: Rosids
- Order: Fabales
- Family: Fabaceae
- Subfamily: Caesalpinioideae
- Clade: Mimosoid clade
- Genus: Acacia
- Species: A. rostellifera

Binomial name
- Acacia rostellifera Benth., 1842
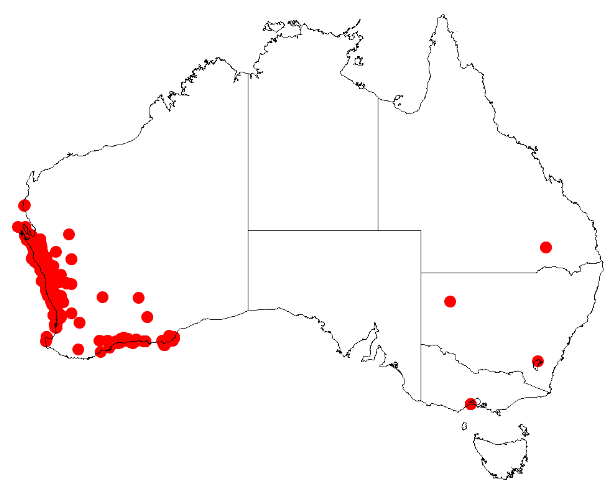
- Occurrence data from AVH

= Acacia rostellifera =

Summer-scented wattle

Species of legume

Acacia rostellifera, commonly known as summer-scented wattle or skunk tree, is a coastal tree or small tree in the family Fabaceae. Endemic to Western Australia, it occurs along the west coast as far north as Kalbarri in the Southwest Australia savanna ecoregion, and along the south coast as far east as Israelite Bay.

The summer-scented wattle generally reproduces by suckers from underground stems. Because of this suckering, the species often forms thickets that exclude all other species. The tallest Acacia of its area, it can grow to 10 metres. Specimens above 3 metres are not often seen, however, as bushfires occur often in its area. Fire burns the plants right to the ground, but the underground stem resprouts vigorously.

== See also ==
- List of Acacia species
