= Poverty bush =

Poverty bush is a common name for several plants and may refer to:

- Acacia translucens, a shrub that occurs on spinifex plains in northern Australia
- Acacia stellaticeps, a shrub found in the north of Western Australia
- Eremophila (plant), a genus of plants of the family Myoporaceae, endemic to arid regions of Australia
- Kunzea ambigua, a shrub found in eastern Australia, also known as white kunzea or tick bush
