= Southwest Australia savanna =

Terrestrial ecoregion in Western Australia

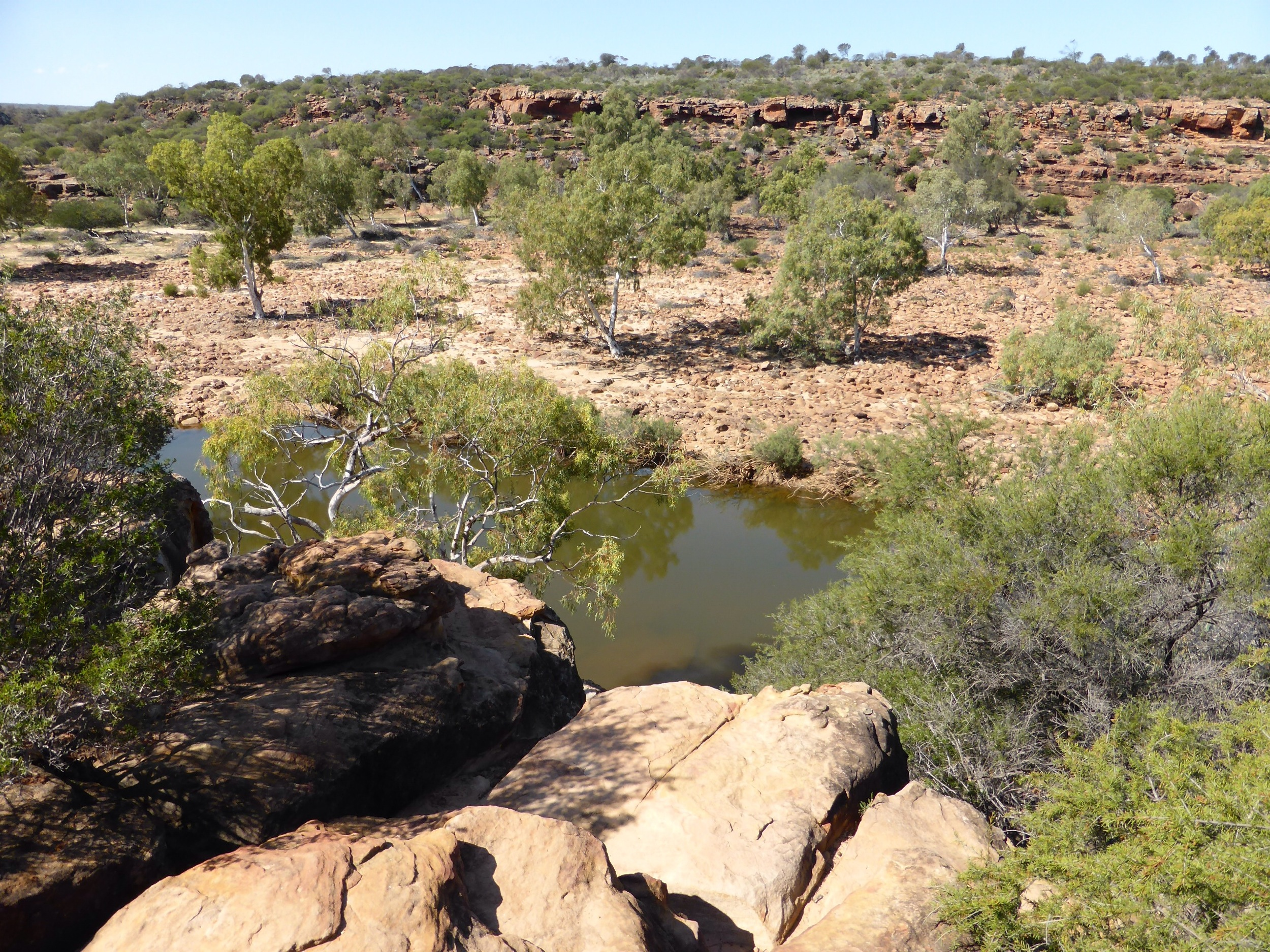
- Murchison River Gorge in Kalbarri National Park, Western Australia

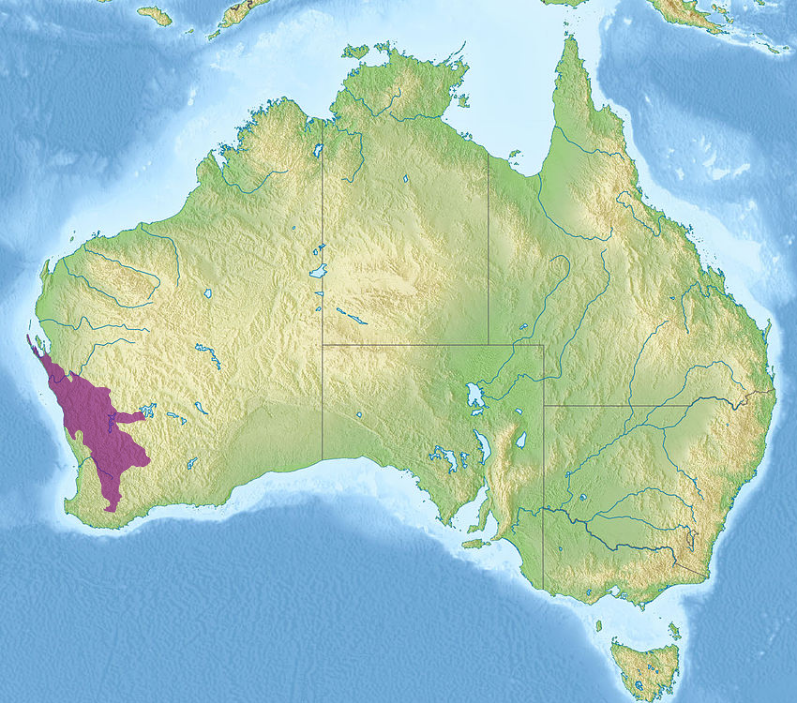
- Ecoregion territory (in purple)

Ecology
- Realm: Australasian
- Biome: Mediterranean forests, woodlands, and scrub
- Borders: List: Carnarvon xeric shrublands; Coolgardie woodlands; Esperance mallee; Southwest Australia woodlands; Western Australian mulga shrublands

Geography
- Area: 177,008 km^{2} (68,343 sq mi)
- Country: Australia
- States: Western Australia
- Coordinates: 29.9°S 116.5°E

Conservation
- Conservation status: Critical/endangered
- Protected: 15,778 km² (9%)

The Southwest Australia savanna is an ecoregion in Western Australia.

== Location and description ==
The southwest Australia savanna is at the transition between the Mediterranean climate ecoregions of Australia's southwest corner and the deserts and xeric shrublands to the north and inland. Much of the area is now converted to wheat-growing.

The ecoregion is bounded by the drier Carnarvon xeric shrublands to the north, and the Western Australian Mulga shrublands to the northeast. Mediterranean-climate ecoregions lie to the east and south – the Coolgardie woodlands to the east, the Esperance mallee to the southeast, and the Southwest Australia woodlands to the southwest. It is bounded on the west by the Indian Ocean.

The ecoregion contains three Interim Biogeographic Regionalisation for Australia (IBRA) regions – Avon Wheatbelt, Geraldton Sandplains, and Yalgoo.

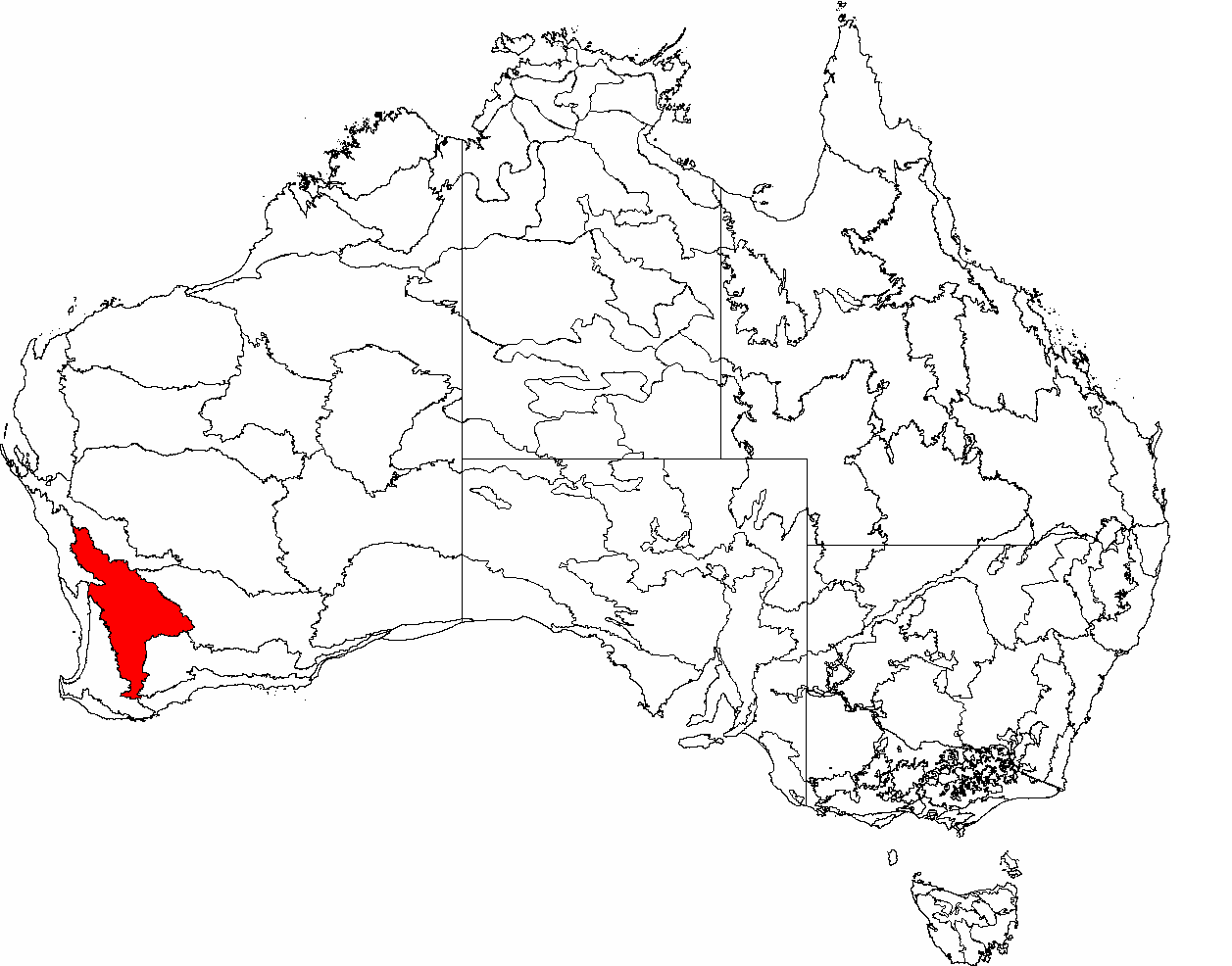
The IBRA regions, with Avon Wheatbelt in red

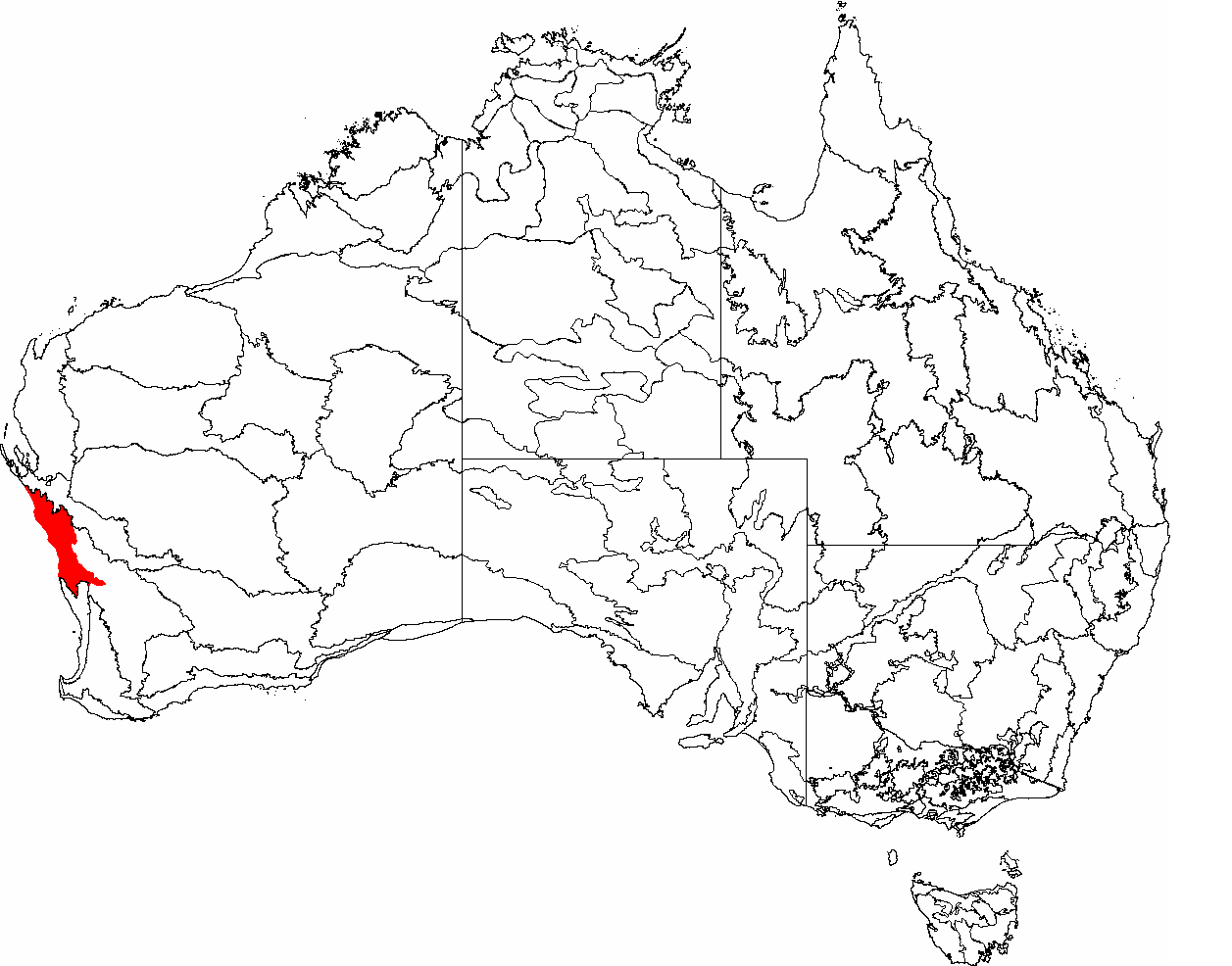
The IBRA regions, with the Geraldton Sandplains in red

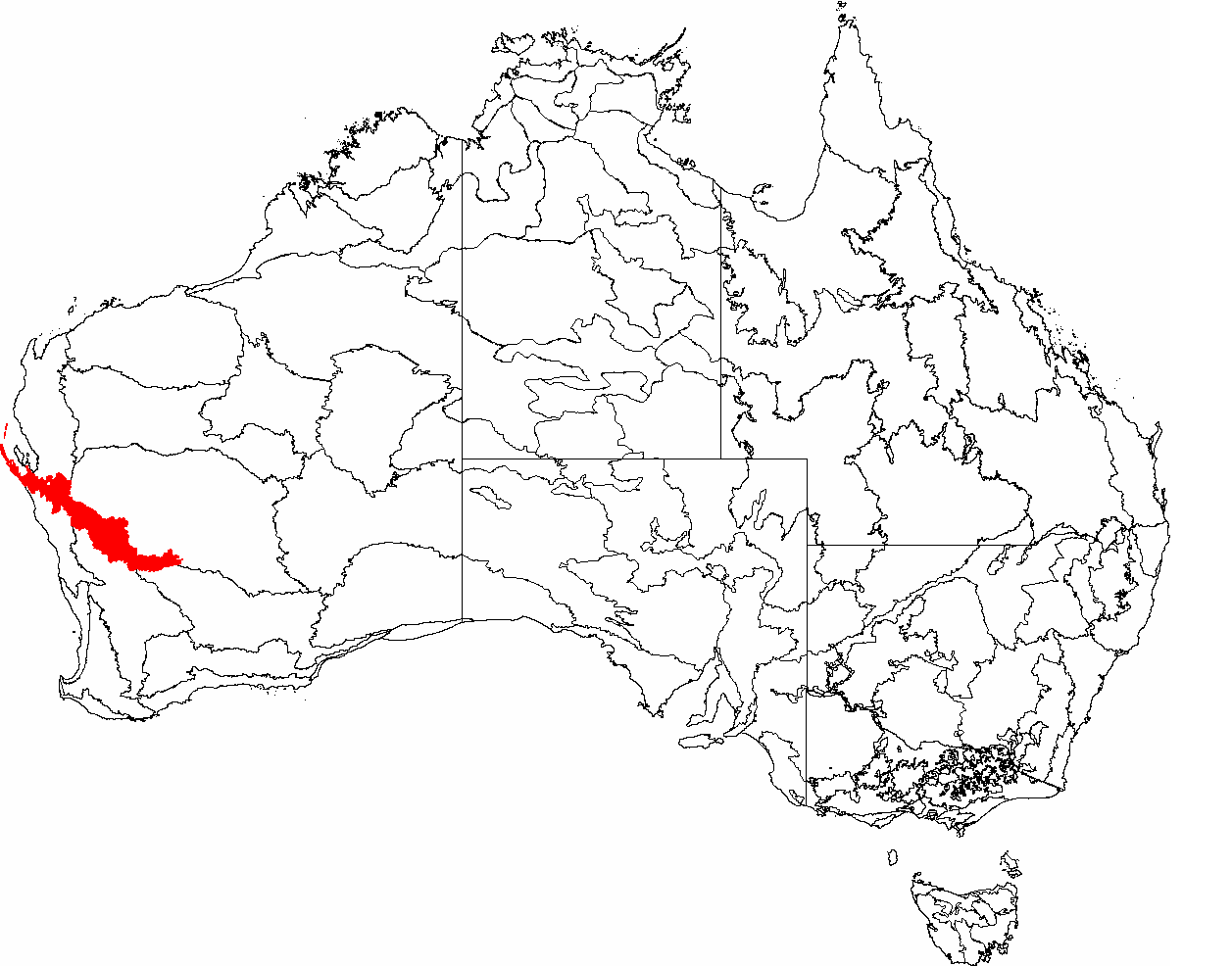
The IBRA regions, with Yalgoo in red

== Flora ==
The ecoregion is part of the Southwest Australia biodiversity hotspot.

The original habitat consists of savanna dotted with eucalyptus woodland, mallee woodlands and shrublands, and heath. Although the more fertile southern areas have now mostly been converted to wheat fields, more original savanna remains in the north of the region where there are more acacia trees than eucalyptus. Plants of the region include many wildflowers and trees including the scented Acacia rostellifera. The best-preserved area of original habitat is found in and around the multi-colored sandstone gorges of Kalbarri National Park on the Murchison River.

== Fauna ==
Birds of the area include the emu, although this has been hunted as a pest by the wheat-growing community, and the honey-eating western spinebill. Mammals include the honey possum (Tarsipes rostratus) and the southwestern pygmy possum (Cercartetus concinnus), both of which feed on nectar from the wildflowers.

== Protected Areas ==
A 2017 assessment found that 15,778 km², or 9%, of the ecoregion is in protected areas. They include Kalbarri National Park, Alexander Morrison National Park, Badgingarra National Park, Beekeepers Nature Reserve, Pinjarrega Nature Reserve, Toolonga Nature Reserve, Wandana Nature Reserve, and Zuytdorp Nature Reserve.

== See also ==
- Southwest Australia woodlands
- Southwest Australia
