= Geraldton Sandplains =

Bioregion of Western Australia

- Region
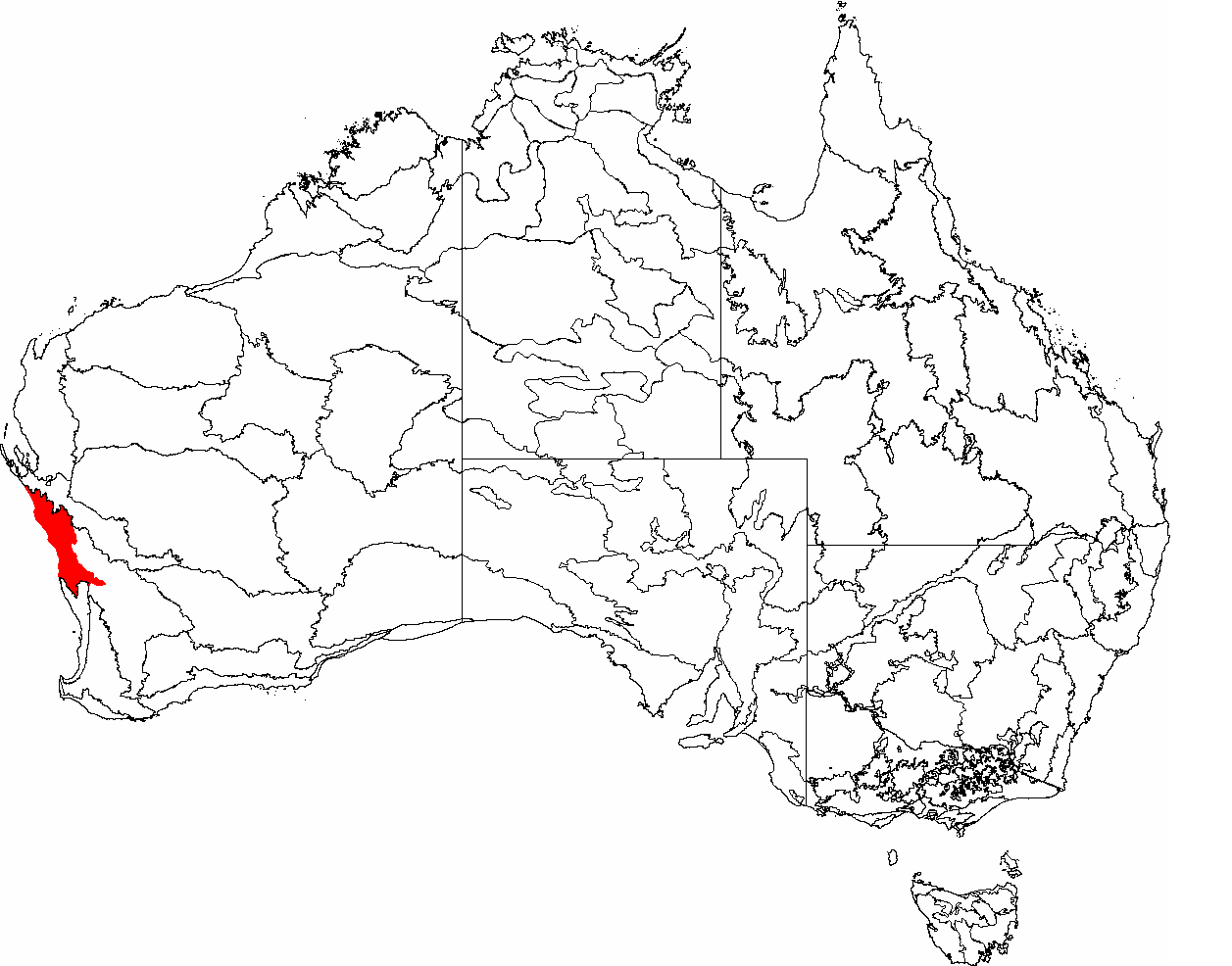
- The interim Australian bioregions, with Geraldton Sandplains in red
- Country: Australia
- State: Western Australia

Area
  - Total: 31,421.49 km^{2} (12,131.91 sq mi)
Localities around Geraldton Sandplains
| Indian Ocean | Yalgoo | Yalgoo |
| Indian Ocean | Geraldton Sandplains | Avon Wheatbelt |
| Indian Ocean | Swan Coastal Plain | Avon Wheatbelt |

Geraldton Sandplains is an interim Australian bioregion of Western Australia. It has an area of 3,142,149 hectares (7,764,420 acres). The Geraldton Sandplains is part of the larger Southwest Australia savanna ecoregion, as assessed by the World Wildlife Fund.

== Subregions ==
IBRA regions and subregions: IBRA7
| IBRA region / subregion | IBRA code | Area | States | Location in Australia |
|---|---|---|---|---|
| Geraldton Sandplains | GES | 3,142,149 hectares (7,764,420 acres) | WA | |
| Geraldton Hills | GES01 | 1,969,997 hectares (4,867,970 acres) | WA | |
| Leseur Sandplain | GES02 | 1,172,152 hectares (2,896,450 acres) | WA | |

== See also ==
- Shark Bay, Western Australia
