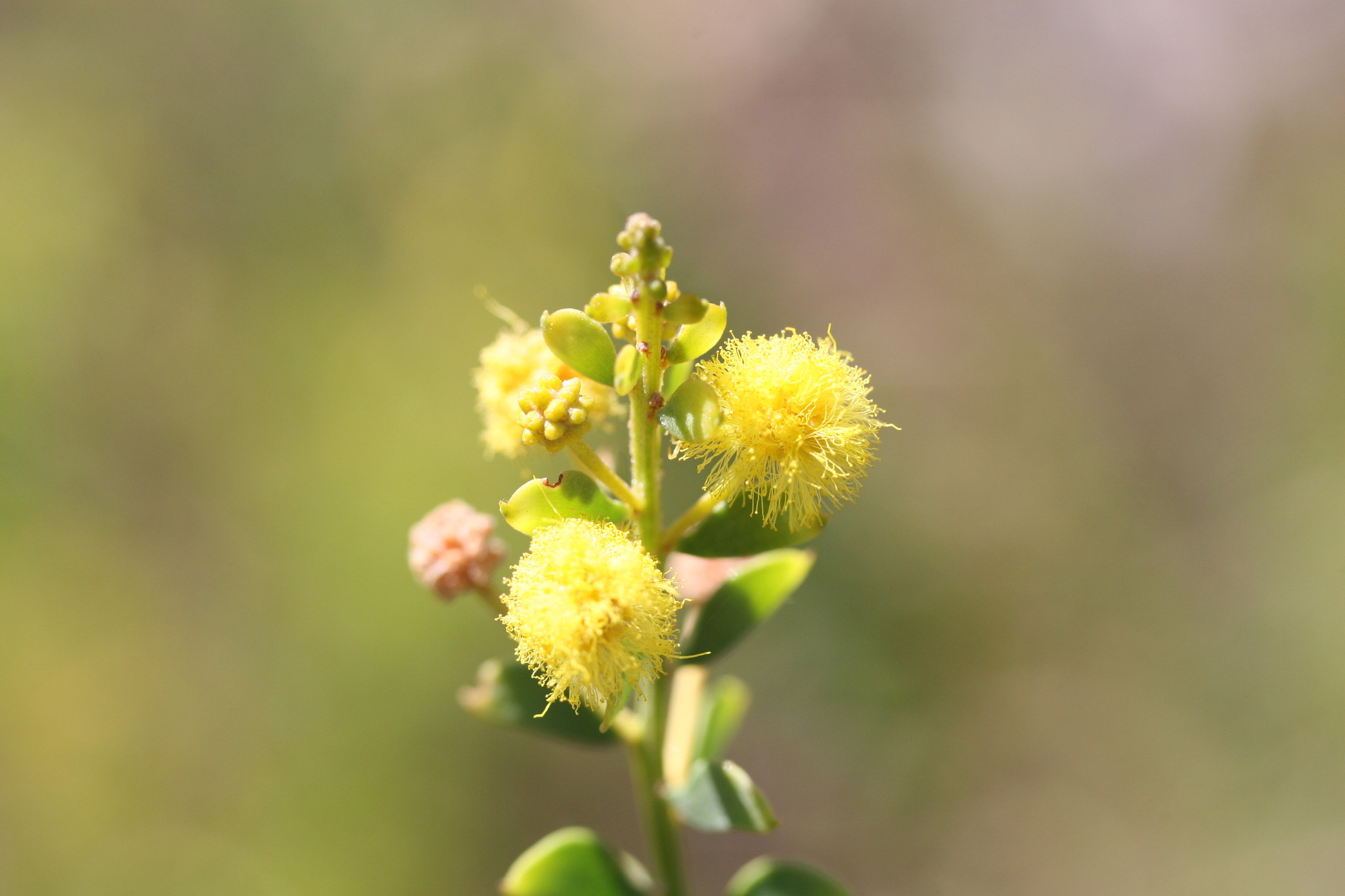

Scientific classification
- Kingdom: Plantae
- Clade: Tracheophytes
- Clade: Angiosperms
- Clade: Eudicots
- Clade: Rosids
- Order: Fabales
- Family: Fabaceae
- Subfamily: Caesalpinioideae
- Clade: Mimosoid clade
- Genus: Acacia
- Species: A. translucens

Binomial name
- Acacia translucens A.Cunn. ex Hook.
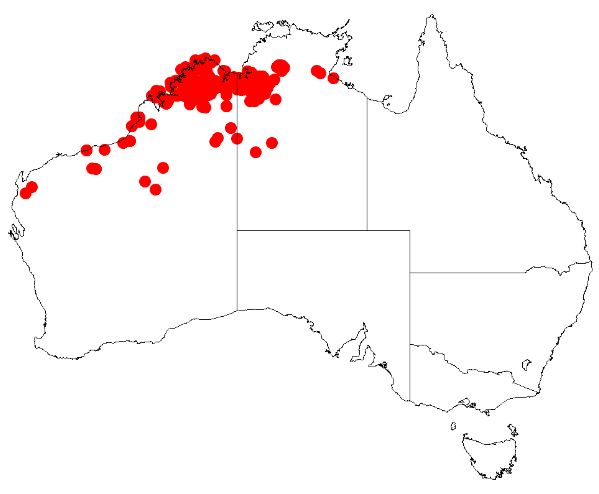
- Occurrence data from AVH

= Acacia translucens =

Poverty bush

Species of legume

Acacia translucens, commonly known as poverty bush, is a shrub that is endemic to a large area of north western Australia.

== Description ==
Poverty bush is a low, spreading shrub with a flat top that grows to a height of 0.5 to 3 m (1 ft 8 in to 9 ft 10 in) and a width of around 1.5 m (4 ft 11 in) and that branches near ground level and has dark grey to black coloured bark that is quite smooth. As with many arid shrubland Acacia species, it has phyllodes instead of leaves. The thinly leathery dull grey-green phyllodes have a narrowly elliptic to elliptic shape and are curved and slightly sigmoid with a length of 0.6 to 2 cm (0.24 to 0.79 in) in length and with a width of 4 to 9 mm (0.16 to 0.35 in) with three more or less visible main nerves. It blooms between March and November. Its flowers are yellow, and held in spherical clusters about 5 mm (0.20 in) in diameter. The seed pods are held erect above the foliage, instead of hanging down like most Acacias. The brittle, thinly woody, brown to black coloured seed pods that are formed after flowering have a narrowly oblanceolate to oblanceolate shape with a length of 2 to 5.5 cm (0.79 to 2.17 in) and a width of 4 to 10 mm (0.16 to 0.39 in) with oblique nerves. The brown seeds inside have an oblong shape with a length of 3 to 6 mm (0.12 to 0.24 in).

== Taxonomy ==
The species was first formally described by the botanist Allan Cunninhgham in 1837 as a part of the William Jackson Hooker work Icones Plantarum. It was reclassified as Racosperma transluscens in 1987 by Leslie Pedley then transferred back to genus Acacia in 2006.

== Distribution ==
It is native to arid areas of spinifex plains in northern Australia. It is distributed throughout the inland Pilbara and Kimberley regions of Western Australia, and east into the Victoria River region of the Northern Territory usually growing in shallow sandy soils of sandstone. It is often situated in gully floors and on hillsides as a part of open Eucalyptus woodland communities.

== Cultivation ==
The plant is used in gardens and is a hardy grower in tropical regions and needs a sunny position and well-drained soil. The seeds need to be treated with boiling water or scarified for propagation.

== See also ==
- List of Acacia species
