= Kumarina, Western Australia =

Kumarina
- Town
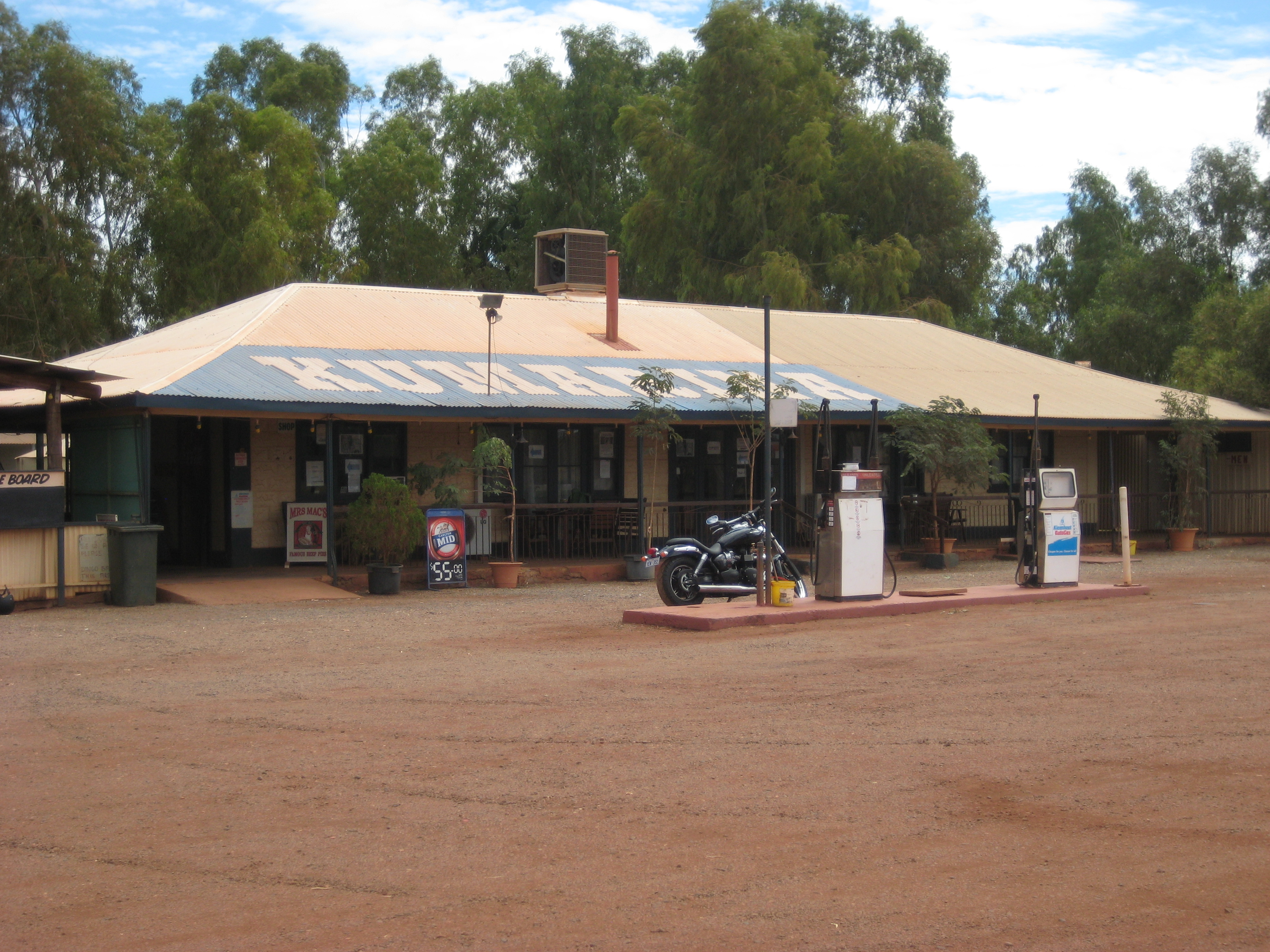
- Kumarina Roadhouse, 2011

- Interactive map of Kumarina
- Coordinates: 25.14°S 119.69°E
- Country: Australia
- State: Western Australia
- LGA: Shire of Meekatharra
- Location: 1,025 km (637 mi) NE of Perth; 626 km (389 mi) S of Port Hedland; 249 km (155 mi) N of Meekatharra; 173 km (107 mi) S of Newman

Government
  - State electorate: North West
  - Federal division: Durack

Area
  - Total: 16,361.5 km^{2} (6,317.2 sq mi)
- Elevation: 610 m (2,000 ft)

Population
  - Total: 91 (SAL 2021)
- Postcode: 6642

Kumarina is a town in the Mid West region of Western Australia along the Great Northern Highway between the towns of Meekatharra and Newman. It is the closest settlement to Collier Range National Park. It contains a roadhouse and a caravan park, as well as a small wildlife sanctuary, tavern, motel and restaurant.

At the 2016 census, Kumarina and the surrounding area had a population of 54.
