= Esperance mallee =

Terrestrial ecoregion in Australia

Coordinates: 33°20′S 121°10′E

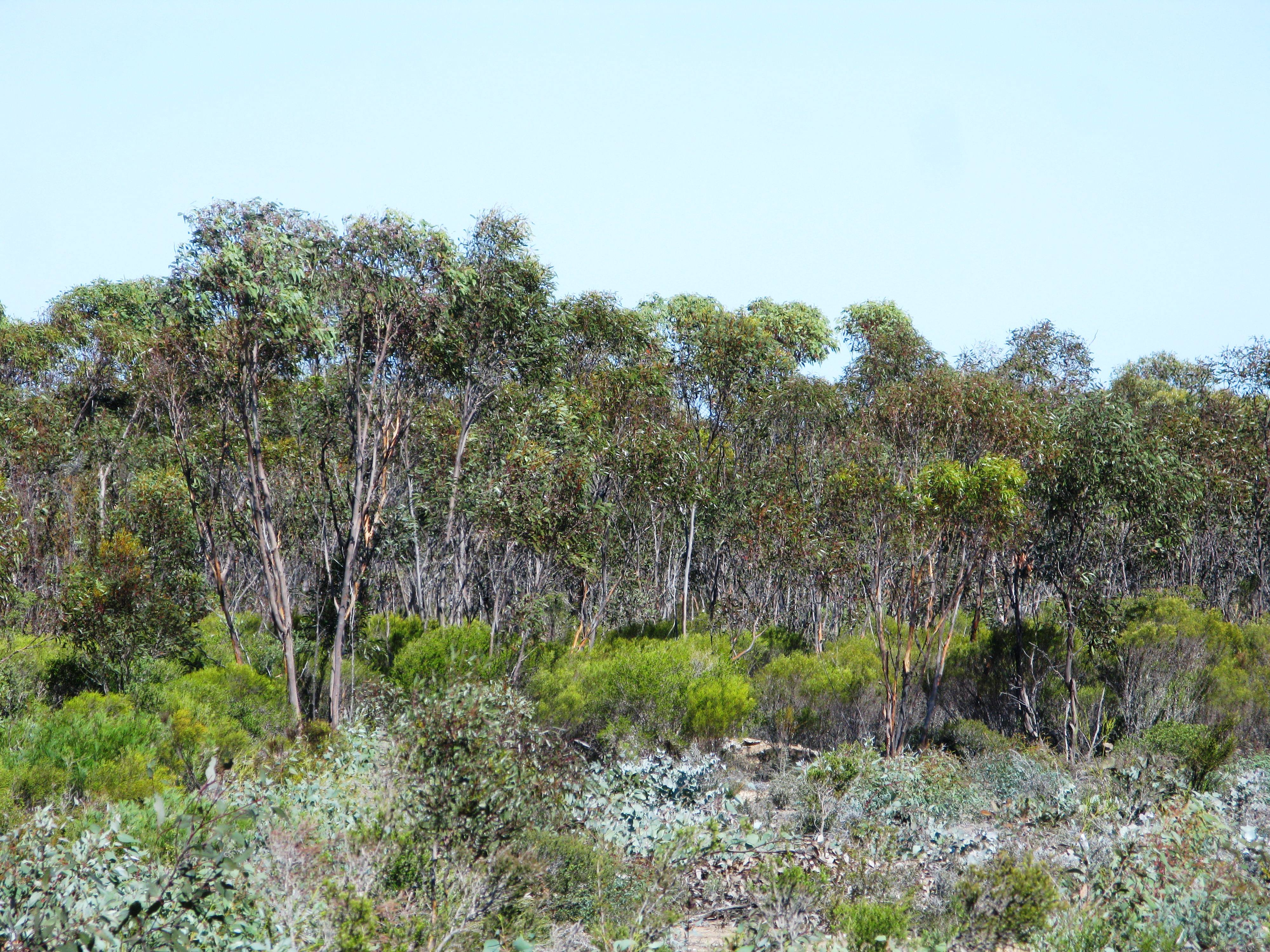
- Sand mallee (Eucalyptus eremophila) at Clyde Hill Nature Reserve, Western Australia

- location map showing the Esperance mallee ecoregion

Ecology
- Realm: Australasian
- Biome: Mediterranean forests, woodlands, and scrub
- Borders: Coolgardie woodlands; Southwest Australia savanna; Southwest Australia woodlands

Geography
- Area: 102,261 km^{2} (39,483 sq mi)
- Country: Australia
- States: Western Australia

Conservation
- Conservation status: Critical/endangered
- Protected: 21,103 km^{2} (21%)

Esperance mallee is an ecoregion on the south coast of Western Australia, a coastal strip where the predominant vegetation consists of short eucalyptus trees and shrubs.

== Location and description ==
A part of the Mediterranean forests, woodlands, and scrub biome, Esperance mallee is an aggregation of the Esperance Plains and Mallee Interim Biogeographic Regionalisation for Australia (IBRA) regions.

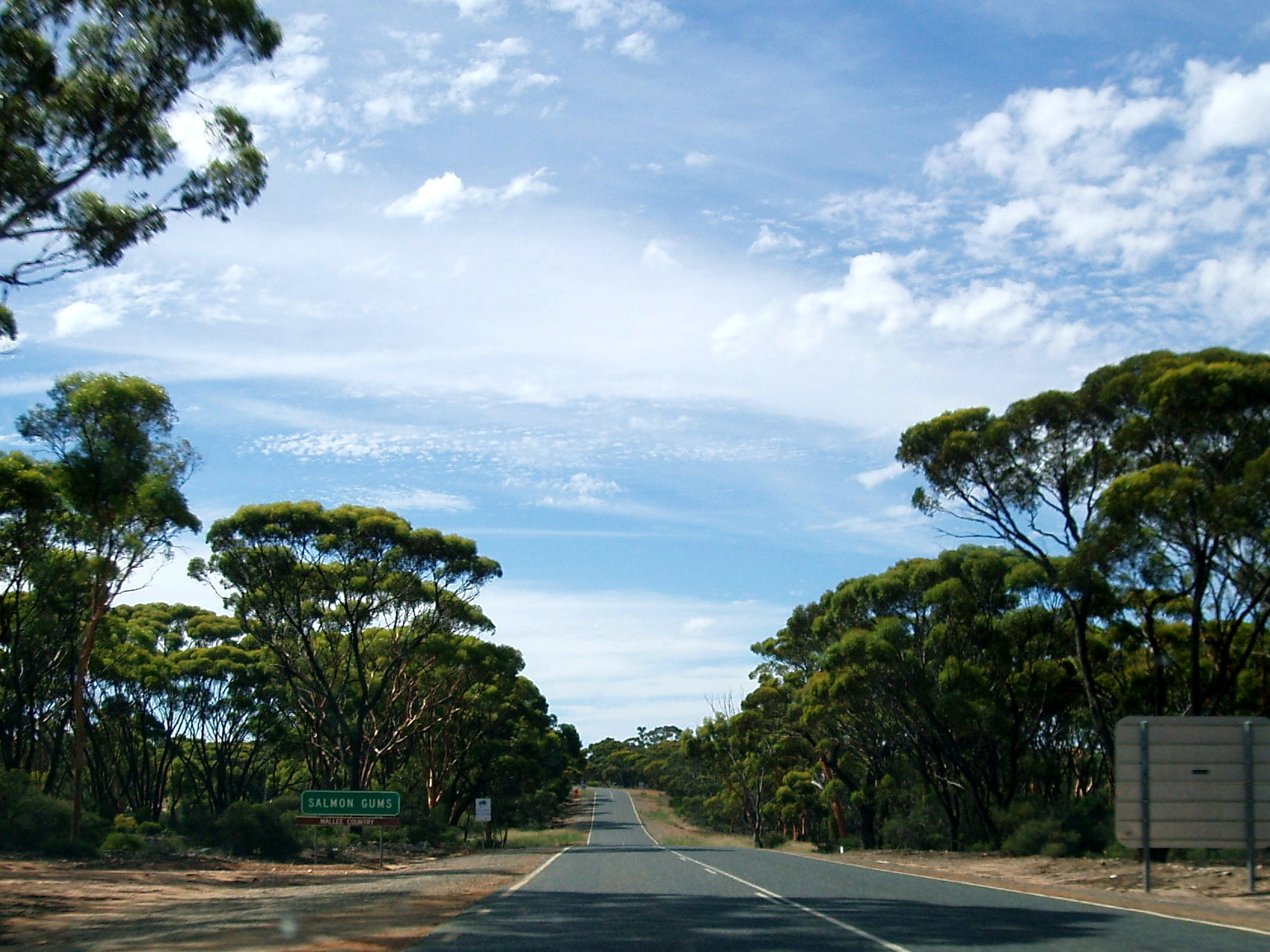
Salmon gum (Eucalyptus salmonophloia) woodland along the Coolgardie-Esperance highway in Salmon Gums, Western Australia.

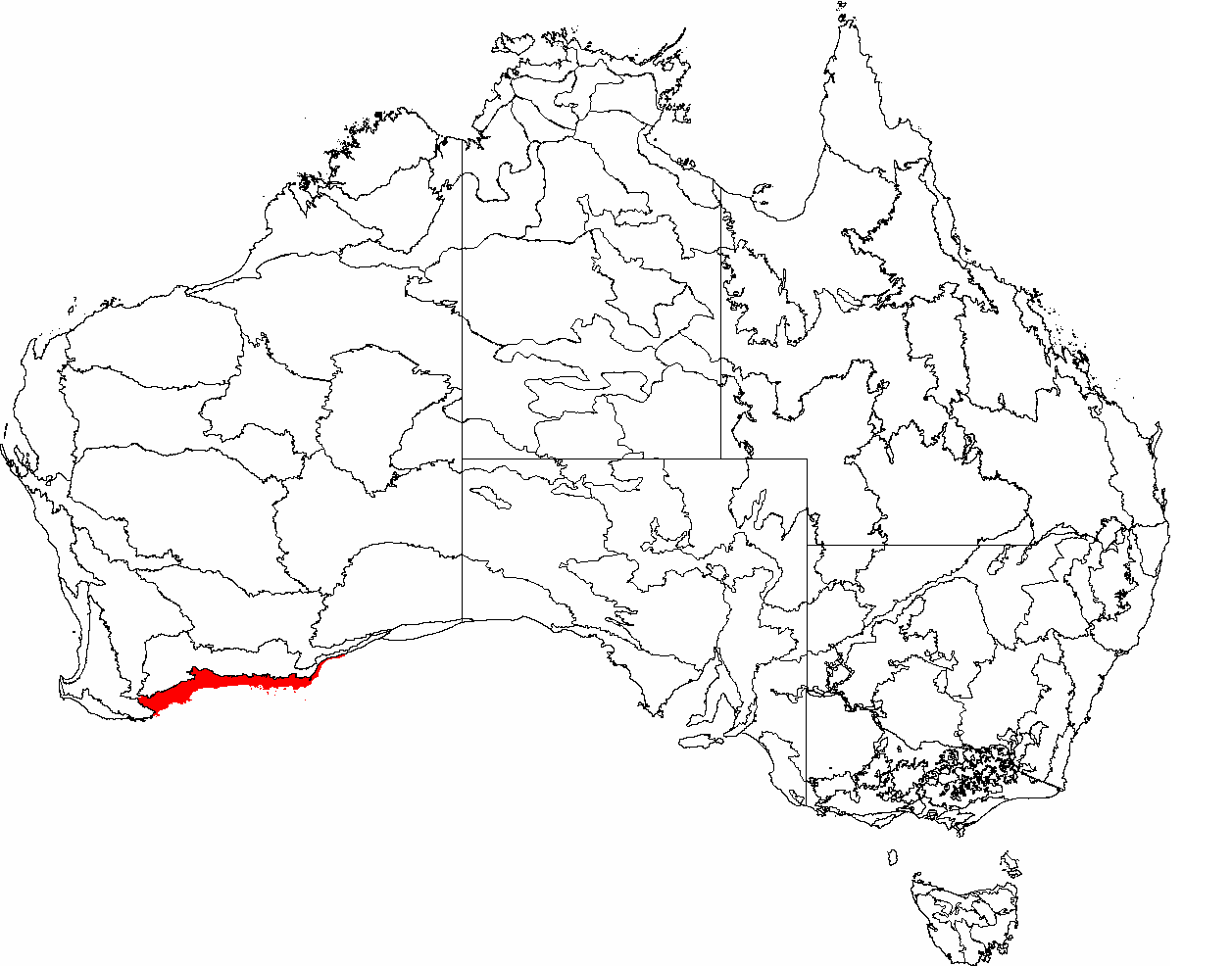
The IBRA regions, with the Esperance Plains in red

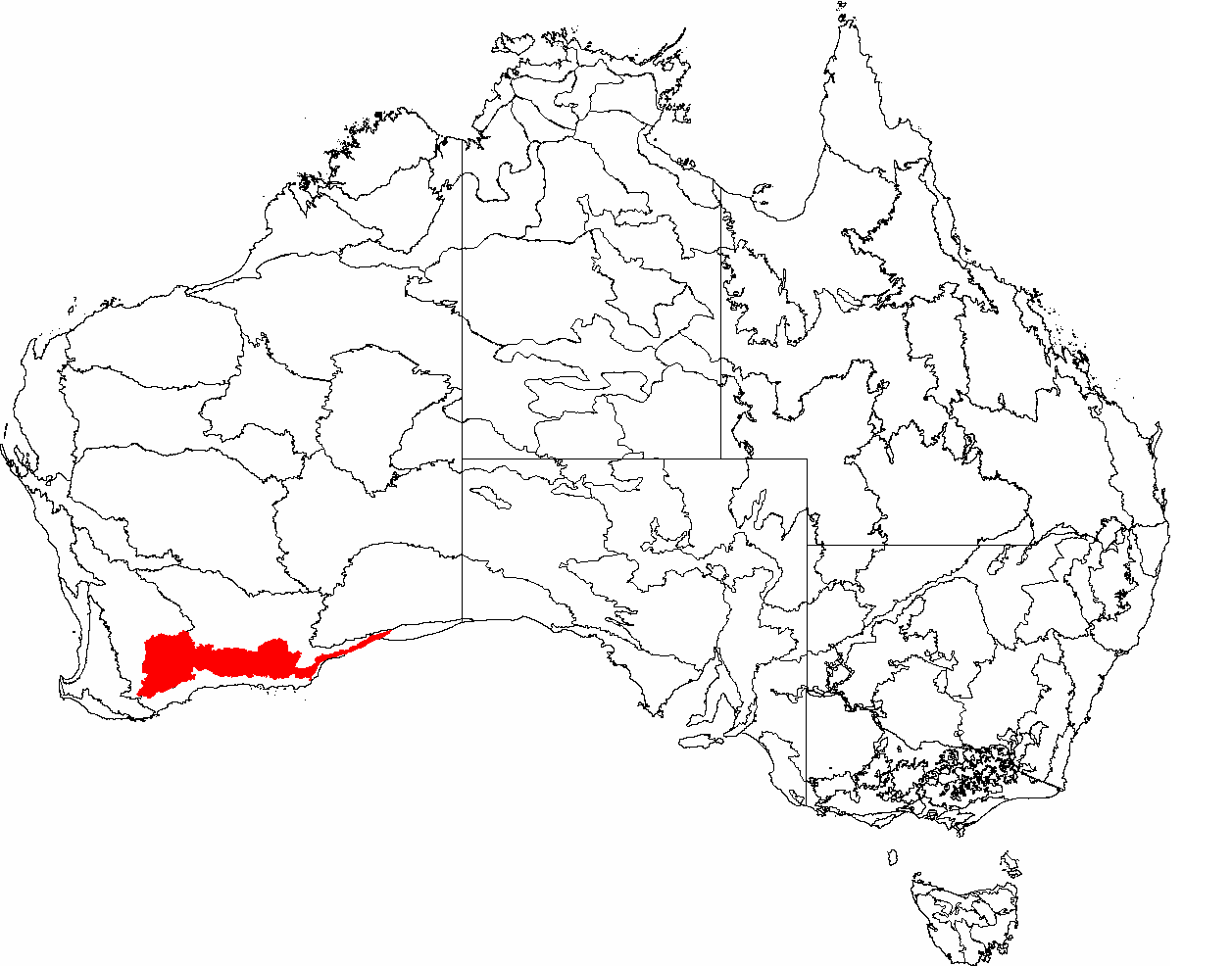
The IBRA regions, with Mallee in red

== Flora ==
Mallee is a generic term used to describe a number of eucalyptus trees that have an underground bulb called a lignotuber from which new buds can sprout following a forest fire. Mallee trees and accompanying shrubs are thus adapted to the poor soils, lack of rainfall, and regular fires, something common for the dry coast.

== Fauna ==
Wildlife of the coast includes the highly venomous common death adder. Mammals include tiny honey possums (which feed on nectar of the kangaroo paw flowers) and the endangered western quoll. Birds include the endangered western whipbird, western ground parrots, red-winged fairywren, Australian white ibis, and the rare southwestern Cape Barren goose on the coast.

== Threats and preservation ==
Much of the area is used as agricultural land and habitats are threatened by clearance. This is leading to fragmentation, over-irrigation, and wildlife becoming vulnerable to introduced species such as foxes.

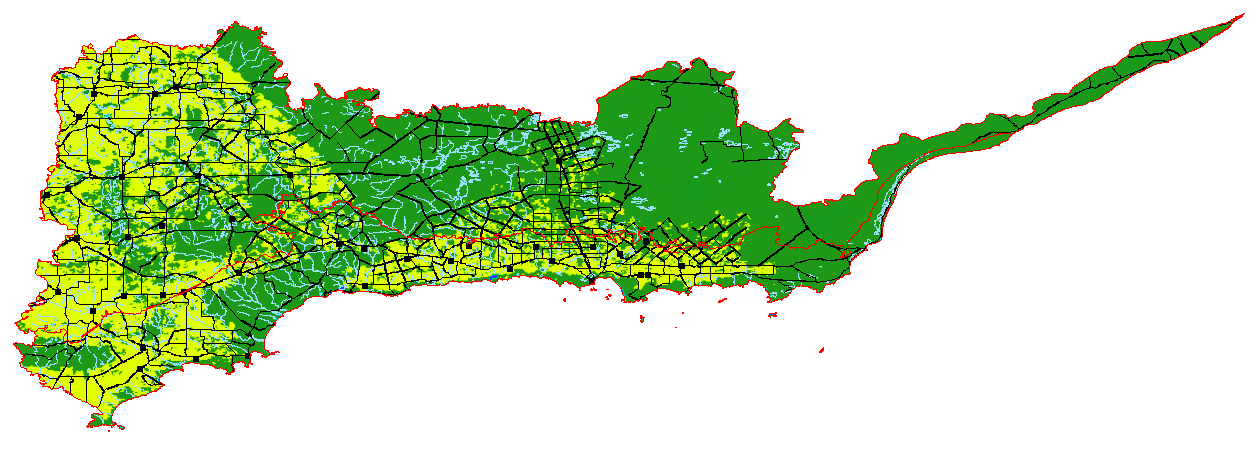
The Esperance mallee ecoregion, with agricultural areas in yellow, and native vegetation in green. The IBRA boundaries are shown in red. Towns, road, and railways are also shown.

== Protected areas ==
A 2017 assessment found that 21,103 km^{2}, or 21%, of the ecoregion is in protected areas. Protected areas include Cape Arid National Park, Fitzgerald River National Park, Frank Hann National Park, and Nuytsland Nature Reserve.
