= Mulga (habitat) =

Habitat dominated by the mulga tree

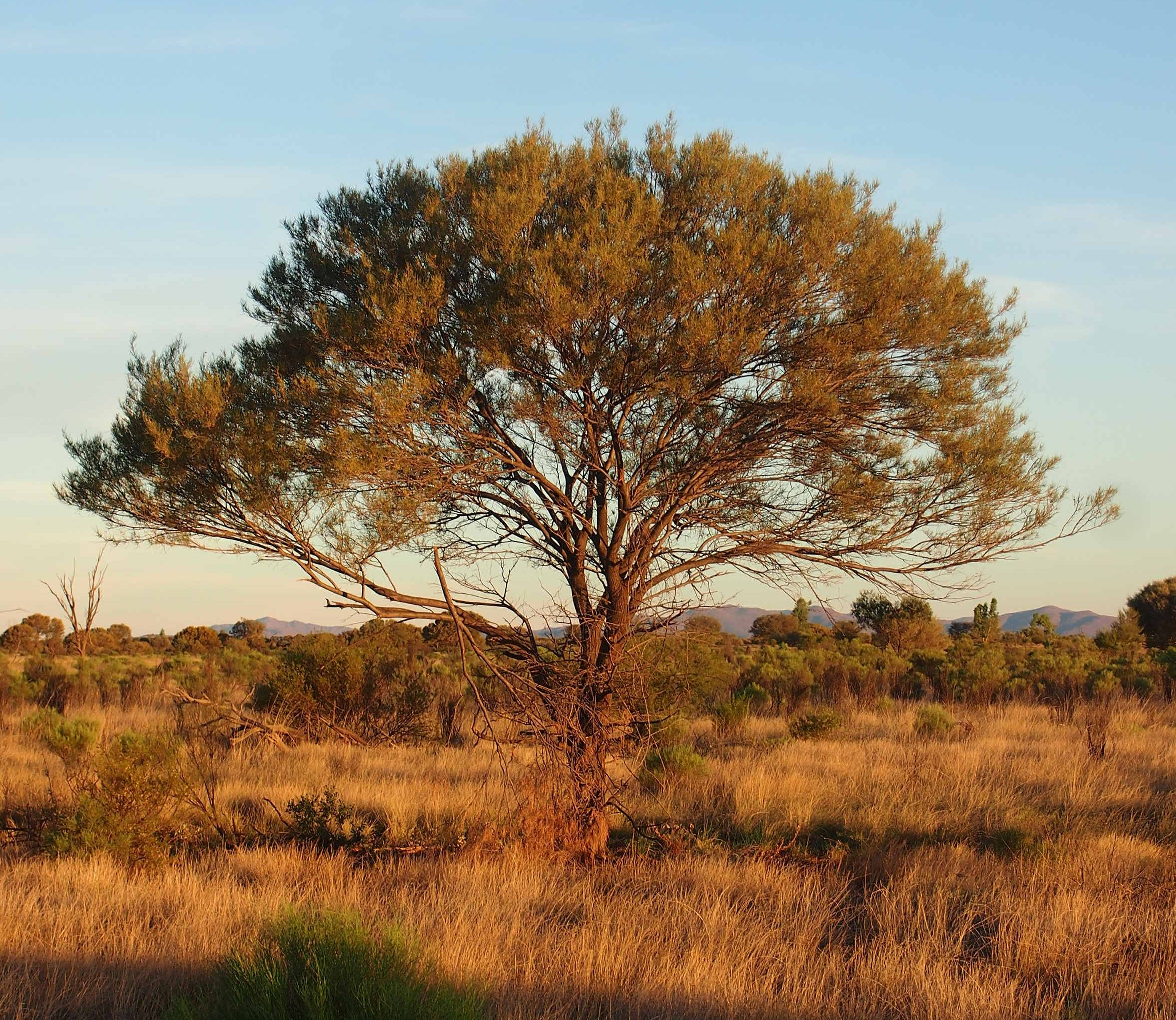
Acacia aneura

Mulga is a type of habitat composed of woodland or open forest dominated by the mulga tree, Acacia aneura, or similar species of Acacia.

== Regions ==
It is found across Australia, covering 20% of arid regions, including much of southwestern Queensland, New South Wales, South Australia, and Western Australia.

The Mulga Lands are an interim Australian bioregion located in northwestern New South Wales and southwestern Queensland in eastern Australia consisting of dry sandy plains with low mulga woodlands and shrublands that are dominated by mulga. The Western Australian mulga shrublands is a large dry World Wildlife Fund ecoregion of inland Western Australia.

== Vegetation ==
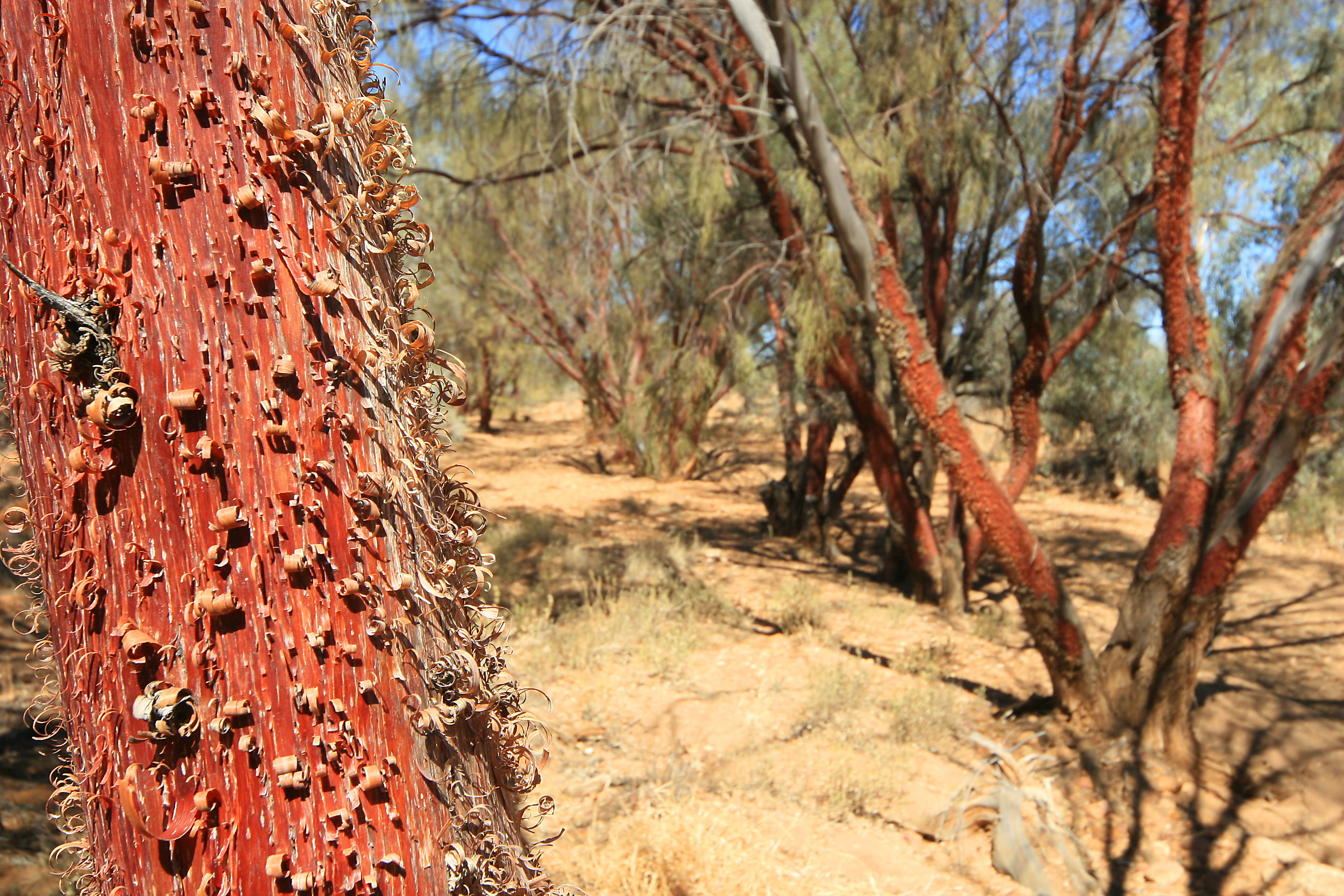
Acacia cyperophylla, red mulga

The vegetation type is associated with the extensive plains of the continent's interior and other arid regions with infrequent and irregular rainfall. Mulga country intersperses with other vegetation such as spinifex, dominated by low mounds of Triodia, and wattle scrub (Mimosaceae) or interrupted by granitic outcrops, salt lakes, and desert. The mulga itself is a mid-sized tree that is usually well-established in the open woodland, only occurring as young plants in disturbed areas, and is typically around 8 metres tall.

Stands of mulga trees are usually around the same age, eventually dying and replaced in a periodic regeneration cycle. The vegetation type is composed of these trees, shrubs such as saltbushes, poverty bushes, pea flowers, daisies and wattles with grasses at the understory. Large fields of annuals appear after rains, producing remarkable displays of colour against the usual grey-green of mulga country.

== See also ==
- Interim Biogeographic Regionalisation for Australia
- Mallee
