= Collier Range National Park =

National park in Western Australia

- IUCN category II (national park)
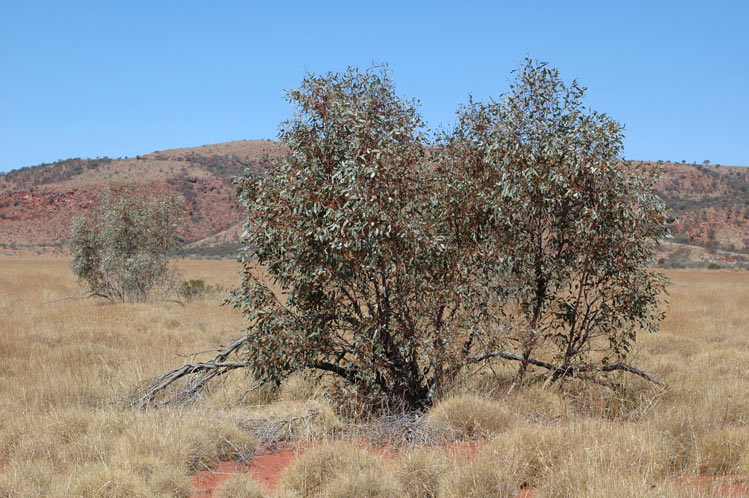
- Eucalyptus kingsmillii on the western side of Collier Range National Park

- Location within Western Australia
- Location: Western Australia
- Nearest city: Newman
- Coordinates: 24°37′25″S 119°16′19″E
- Area: 2,351.62 km^{2} (907.97 sq mi)
- Established: 1978
- Governing body: Department of Parks and Wildlife

Collier Range National Park is a national park in the Pilbara region of Western Australia, 878 km (546 mi) northeast of Perth.

The nearest major town to the park is Newman located about 166 km (103 mi) north near Kumarina. The park is one of many in the Pilbara and was established in 1978.

The ranges vary from low hills to high ridges with many cliffs. The vegetation found in the area is mostly spinifex and mulga with creeklines being surrounded by eucalypts. Mulga scrub and mulla mulla are found in dense scrubland in the northeastern plains with spinifex and sand dunes being found in the western end.

The park is the home of the threatened Pilbara Pebble-Mound Mouse Pseudomys chapmani which is also found in the Millstream-Chichester National Park and the Karlamilyi National Park.

The mulga habitat is a refuge for the critical weight range mammals such as Macrotis lagotis (greater bilby), Dasycercus cristicauda (mulgara) and dasyurids.

The standard of management in the park is poor and is only visited occasionally by Department of Parks and Wildlife staff from Karratha. The park is baited for wild dogs but suffers damage from feral donkeys and wandering cattle. No fire management is in practice and weed problems are unknown.

== See also ==
- Protected areas of Western Australia
