= List of ecoregions in Australia =

Ecoregions in Australia are geographically distinct plant and animal communities, defined by the World Wide Fund for Nature based on geology, soils, climate, and predominant vegetation.

The World Wide Fund for Nature (WWF) identified 825 terrestrial ecoregions that cover the Earth's land surface, 40 of which cover Australia and its dependent islands. The WWF ecoregions are classified by biome type (tropical and subtropical moist broadleaf forests, temperate grasslands, savannas, and shrublands, tundra, etc.), and into one of eight terrestrial realms. Australia, together with New Zealand, New Guinea and neighboring island groups, is part of the Australasian realm. The IBRA bioregions informed the delineation of the WWF ecoregions for Australia, and the WWF ecoregions generally follow the same ecoregion boundaries, while often clustering two or more similar bioregions into a larger ecoregion. The ecoregion articles in Wikipedia generally follow the WWF scheme.

The WWF ecoregions are based heavily upon the Interim Biogeographic Regionalisation for Australia (IBRA) regionalisation. Like the IBRA, it was developed for use as a planning tool for conservation science, with the goal of establishing a system of nature reserves in each of the ecoregions or bioregions sufficient to preserve biodiversity. Both systems also have a prioritization system for establishing preserves; the WWF designated its Global 200 ecoregions as priorities for conservation, and the Department of Environment and Heritage ranks its bioregions high, medium, or low priority, based on "the potential value land reservation in those regions would add to the development of a comprehensive, adequate and representative reserve system for Australia."

== WWF terrestrial ecoregions ==
Tropical and subtropical moist broadleaf forests

- Lord Howe Island subtropical forests
- Norfolk Island subtropical forests
- Queensland tropical rain forests

Temperate broadleaf and mixed forests

- Eastern Australian temperate forests
- Southeast Australia temperate forests
- Tasmanian Central Highlands forests
- Tasmanian temperate forests
- Tasmanian temperate rain forests

Tropical and subtropical grasslands, savannas, and shrublands

- Arnhem Land tropical savanna
- Brigalow tropical savanna
- Cape York Peninsula tropical savanna
- Carpentaria tropical savanna
- Einasleigh Uplands savanna
- Kimberley tropical savanna
- Mitchell Grass Downs
- Victoria Plains tropical savanna

Temperate grasslands, savannas, and shrublands

- Eastern Australia mulga shrublands
- Southeast Australia temperate savanna

Montane grasslands and shrublands

- Australian Alps montane grasslands

Tundra

- Antipodes Subantarctic Islands tundra (Australia, New Zealand)

Mediterranean forests, woodlands, and scrub

- Coolgardie woodlands
- Esperance mallee
- Eyre and York mallee
- Jarrah-Karri forest and shrublands
- Swan Coastal Plain scrub and woodlands
- Mount Lofty woodlands
- Murray-Darling woodlands and mallee
- Naracoorte woodlands
- Southwest Australia savanna
- Southwest Australia woodlands

Deserts and xeric shrublands

- Carnarvon xeric shrublands
- Central Ranges xeric scrub
- Gibson Desert
- Great Sandy-Tanami desert
- Great Victoria Desert
- Nullarbor Plain xeric shrublands
- Pilbara shrublands
- Simpson Desert
- Tirari–Sturt stony desert
- Western Australian mulga shrublands

=== WWF terrestrial ecoregions and IBRA bioregions ===
This table shows which IBRA bioregions correspond to which WWF ecoregions.

IBRA 7 bioregion	WWF ecoregion
Arnhem Coast (ARC)	Arnhem Land tropical savanna
Arnhem Plateau (ARP)	Arnhem Land tropical savanna
Australian Alps (AUA)	Australian Alps montane grasslands
Avon Wheatbelt (AVW)	Southwest Australia savanna
Brigalow Belt North (BBN)	Brigalow tropical savanna
Brigalow Belt South (BBS)	Brigalow tropical savanna
Brigalow Belt South (BBS), southern portion	Southeast Australia temperate savanna
Ben Lomond (BEL)	Tasmanian temperate forests
Broken Hill Complex (BHC)	Tirari-Sturt stony desert
Burt Plain (BRT)	Central Ranges xeric scrub
Carnarvon (CAR)	Carnarvon xeric shrublands
Central Arnhem (CEA)	Arnhem Land tropical savanna
Central Kimberley (CEK)	Kimberley tropical savanna
Central Ranges (CER)	Central Ranges xeric scrub
Channel Country (CHC)	Simpson Desert
Central Mackay Coast (CMC)	Queensland tropical rain forests
Coolgardie (COO)	Coolgardie woodlands
Cobar Peneplain (COP)	Southeast Australia temperate savanna
Coral Sea (COS)	
Cape York Peninsula (CYP)	Cape York Peninsula tropical savanna
Daly Basin (DAB)	Kimberley tropical savanna
Darwin Coastal (DAC)	Arnhem Land tropical savanna
Dampierland (DAL)	Kimberley tropical savanna
Desert Uplands (DEU)	Mitchell Grass Downs
Davenport Murchison Ranges (DMR)	Great Sandy-Tanami desert
Darling Riverine Plains (DRP)	Southeast Australia temperate savanna
Einasleigh Uplands (EIU)	Einasleigh Uplands savanna
Esperance Plains (ESP)	Esperance mallee
Eyre Yorke Block (EYB)	Eyre and York mallee
Finke (FIN)	Central Ranges xeric scrub
Flinders Lofty Block (FLB), northern portion	Tirari-Sturt stony desert
Flinders Lofty Block (FLB), southern portion	Mount Lofty woodlands
Furneaux (FUR)	Tasmanian temperate forests
Gascoyne (GAS)	Western Australian mulga shrublands
Gawler (GAW)	Tirari-Sturt stony desert
Geraldton Sandplains (GES)	Southwest Australia savanna
Gulf Fall and Uplands (GFU)	Carpentaria tropical savanna
Gibson Desert (GID)	Gibson Desert
Great Sandy Desert (GSD)	Great Sandy-Tanami desert
Gulf Coastal (GUC)	Carpentaria tropical savanna
Gulf Plains (GUP)	Carpentaria tropical savanna
Great Victoria Desert (GVD)	Great Victoria Desert
Hampton (HAM)	Coolgardie woodlands
Indian Tropical Islands (ITI)	Christmas and Cocos Islands tropical forests
Jarrah Forest (JAF)	Southwest Australian woodlands
Kanmantoo (KAN)	Mount Lofty woodlands
King (KIN)	Tasmanian temperate rain forests
Little Sandy Desert (LSD)	Great Sandy-Tanami desert
MacDonnell Ranges (MAC)	Central Ranges xeric scrub
Mallee (MAL)	Esperance mallee
Murray Darling Depression (MDD)	Murray-Darling woodlands and mallee
Mitchell Grass Downs (MGD)	Mitchell Grass Downs
Mount Isa Inlier (MII)	Mitchell Grass Downs
Mulga Lands (MUL)	Eastern Australian mulga shrublands
Murchison (MUR)	Western Australian mulga shrublands
Nandewar (NAN)	Eastern Australian temperate forests
Naracoorte Coastal Plain (NCP)	Naracoorte woodlands
New England Tablelands (NET)	Eastern Australian temperate forests
New South Wales North Coast (NNC)	Eastern Australian temperate forests
Northern Kimberley (NOK)	Kimberley tropical savanna
New South Wales South Western Slopes (NSS)	Southeast Australia temperate forests
Nullarbor (NUL)	Nullarbor Plains xeric shrublands
Ord Victoria Plain (OVP)	Victoria Plains tropical savanna
Pine Creek (PCK)	Arnhem Land tropical savanna
Pilbara (PIL)	Pilbara shrublands
Pacific Subtropical Islands (PSI)	Lord Howe Island subtropical forests, Norfolk Island subtropical forests
Riverina (RIV)	Southeast Australia temperate savanna
Subantarctic Islands (SAI)	Antipodes Subantarctic Islands tundra
South East Coastal Plain (SCP)	Southeast Australia temperate forests
South East Corner (SEC)	Southeast Australia temperate forests
South Eastern Highlands (SEH)	Southeast Australia temperate forests
South Eastern Queensland (SEQ)	Eastern Australian temperate forests
Simpson Strzelecki Dunefields (SSD)	Simpson Desert
Stony Plains (STP)	Tirari-Sturt stony desert
Sturt Plateau (STU)	Victoria Plains tropical savanna
Southern Volcanic Plain (SVP)	Southeast Australia temperate forests
Swan Coastal Plain (SWA)	Swan Coastal Plain scrub and woodlands
Sydney Basin (SYB)	Eastern Australian temperate forests
Tanami (TAN)	Great Sandy-Tanami desert
Tasmanian Central Highlands (TCH)	Tasmanian Central Highlands forests
Tiwi Cobourg (TIW)	Arnhem Land tropical savanna
Tasmanian Northern Midlands (TNM)	Tasmanian Central Highlands forests
Tasmanian Northern Slopes (TNS)	Tasmanian temperate rain forests
Tasmanian South East (TSE)	Tasmanian temperate forests
Tasmanian Southern Ranges (TSR)	Tasmanian temperate rain forests
Tasmanian West (TWE)	Tasmanian temperate rain forests
Victoria Bonaparte (VIB)	Kimberley tropical savanna
Victorian Midlands (VIM)	Southeast Australia temperate forests
Warren (WAR)	Jarrah-Karri forest and shrublands
Wet Tropics (WET)	Queensland tropical rain forests
Yalgoo (YAL)	Southwest Australia savanna

== WWF freshwater ecoregions ==
The WWF published Freshwater Ecoregions of the World, a global map of freshwater ecoregions. The WWF team identified ten freshwater ecoregions for Australia and Tasmania. A major habitat type, or biome, was identified for each ecoregion. The four major habitat types present in Australia are tropical and subtropical coastal rivers, temperate coastal rivers, temperate floodplain rivers and wetlands, and xeric freshwaters and endorheic (closed) basins. The Australian freshwater ecoregions were adapted from the freshwater fish biogeographic provinces identified by Peter Unmack and G.R. Allen, S.H. Midgley, and M. Allen, who were also part of the WWF team. The freshwater fish provinces "were derived through similarity analyses, parsimony analysis, and drainage-based plots of species ranges".

Tropical and subtropical coastal rivers

- Arafura–Carpentaria
- Kimberley

Temperate coastal rivers

- Bass Strait Drainages
- Eastern Coastal Australia
- Southern Tasmania
- Southwestern Australia

Temperate floodplain rivers and wetlands

- Murray–Darling

Xeric freshwaters and endorheic (closed) basins

- Lake Eyre Basin
- Paleo
- Pilbara

== See also ==
- Environment of Australia
