= Geography of the Northern Territory =

Geography of Northern Territory
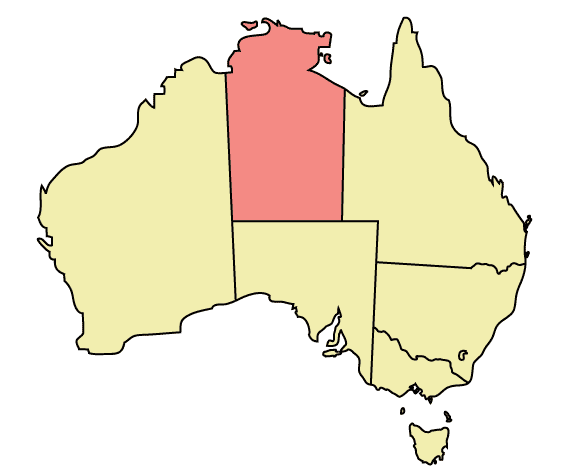
- Continent: Australia
- Coordinates: 20°S 133°E
- Area: Ranked 3rd among states and territories
  - Total: 1,347,791 km^{2} (520,385 sq mi)
- Coastline: 10,953 km (6,806 mi)
- Borders: Land borders: Western Australia, South Australia, Queensland
- Highest point: Mount Zeil; 1,531 m (5021 ft)
- Longest river: Victoria River; 560 km (348 mi)
- Largest lake: Lake Amadeus; 1032 km^{2}

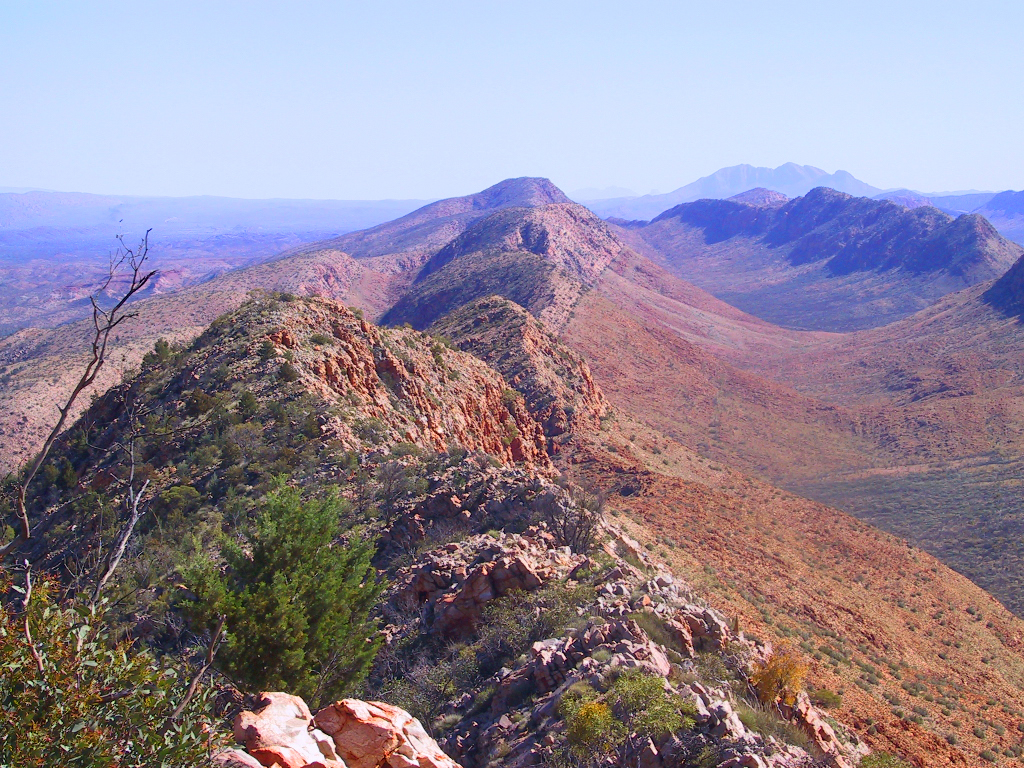
View along the West MacDonnell Ranges

The Northern Territory (NT) occupies the north central part of the continent of Australia. The Northern Territory borders are to the west with Western Australia, the Western Australia border being near the 129° east longitude (129° east). The NT to the south with the South Australian border being the 26th parallel south latitude (26° south). To the east the NT with the Queensland border along the 138° east longitude (138° east).

The geography covers an area of 1,347,791 km^{2} (520,385 sq mi), making it the third-largest Australian state or territory.

== Climate ==
Köppen climate types in the Northern Territory

The Northern Territory has two distinctive climate zones - a tropical climate in the north and a desert climate in the rest of the territory.

The wet season (October to April) has monsoon rains and sometimes tropical cyclones.

The highest temperature recorded in the Northern Territory was 48.3 °C (118.9 °F) at Aputula on 1 and 2 January 1960. The lowest temperature was −7.5 °C (18.5 °F) at Alice Springs on 17 July 1976.

Climate data for Northern Territory (Extremes)
Month	Jan	Feb	Mar	Apr	May	Jun	Jul	Aug	Sep	Oct	Nov	Dec	Year
Record high °C (°F)	48.3 (118.9)	46.4 (115.5)	45.0 (113.0)	41.5 (106.7)	40.2 (104.4)	37.9 (100.2)	37.5 (99.5)	39.7 (103.5)	42.0 (107.6)	45.0 (113.0)	46.1 (115.0)	47.2 (117.0)	48.3 (118.9)
Record low °C (°F)	6.7 (44.1)	8.5 (47.3)	4.7 (40.5)	1.0 (33.8)	−4.2 (24.4)	−6.0 (21.2)	−7.5 (18.5)	−5.4 (22.3)	−2.8 (27.0)	0.0 (32.0)	3.5 (38.3)	7.5 (45.5)	−7.5 (18.5)
Source: Australian Bureau of Meteorology

Climate data for Darwin (Köppen Aw)
Month	Jan	Feb	Mar	Apr	May	Jun	Jul	Aug	Sep	Oct	Nov	Dec	Year
Record high °C (°F)	36.1 (97.0)	36.0 (96.8)	36.0 (96.8)	36.7 (98.1)	36.0 (96.8)	35.0 (95.0)	35.0 (95.0)	37.0 (98.6)	38.0 (100.4)	38.9 (102.0)	37.3 (99.1)	37.1 (98.8)	38.9 (102.0)
Mean maximum °C (°F)	33.5 (92.3)	33.4 (92.1)	34.0 (93.2)	34.4 (93.9)	33.9 (93.0)	32.9 (91.2)	32.8 (91.0)	33.6 (92.5)	34.9 (94.8)	35.2 (95.4)	35.0 (95.0)	34.7 (94.5)	35.2 (95.4)
Mean daily maximum °C (°F)	32.0 (89.6)	31.7 (89.1)	32.3 (90.1)	33.0 (91.4)	32.3 (90.1)	31.1 (88.0)	31.1 (88.0)	31.9 (89.4)	33.1 (91.6)	33.8 (92.8)	33.7 (92.7)	33.0 (91.4)	32.4 (90.4)
Daily mean °C (°F)	28.5 (83.3)	28.4 (83.1)	28.6 (83.5)	28.6 (83.5)	27.3 (81.1)	25.5 (77.9)	25.2 (77.4)	25.8 (78.4)	28.0 (82.4)	29.3 (84.7)	29.5 (85.1)	29.2 (84.6)	27.8 (82.1)
Mean daily minimum °C (°F)	25.1 (77.2)	25.1 (77.2)	24.9 (76.8)	24.2 (75.6)	22.3 (72.1)	20.0 (68.0)	19.3 (66.7)	19.8 (67.6)	22.9 (73.2)	24.8 (76.6)	25.4 (77.7)	25.5 (77.9)	23.3 (73.9)
Mean minimum °C (°F)	23.1 (73.6)	23.2 (73.8)	23.3 (73.9)	22.5 (72.5)	19.1 (66.4)	16.2 (61.2)	16.3 (61.3)	16.9 (62.4)	20.6 (69.1)	23.0 (73.4)	23.3 (73.9)	23.4 (74.1)	16.2 (61.2)
Record low °C (°F)	20.2 (68.4)	17.2 (63.0)	19.2 (66.6)	16.0 (60.8)	13.8 (56.8)	12.1 (53.8)	10.4 (50.7)	13.0 (55.4)	14.3 (57.7)	19.0 (66.2)	19.3 (66.7)	19.8 (67.6)	10.4 (50.7)
Average rainfall mm (inches)	470.7 (18.53)	412.4 (16.24)	313.7 (12.35)	105.1 (4.14)	20.7 (0.81)	2.1 (0.08)	0.9 (0.04)	0.8 (0.03)	14.3 (0.56)	68.9 (2.71)	143.5 (5.65)	279.3 (11.00)	1,832.4 (72.14)
Average rainy days (≥ 1 mm)	19.6	18.2	16.8	7.6	1.7	0.2	0.1	0.2	1.5	5.5	10.1	15.0	96.5
Average afternoon relative humidity (%)	71	74	67	52	41	36	36	38	47	51	58	66	53
Average dew point °C (°F)	24.2 (75.6)	24.3 (75.7)	23.4 (74.1)	19.8 (67.6)	15.8 (60.4)	12.4 (54.3)	11.8 (53.2)	13.1 (55.6)	18.1 (64.6)	20.3 (68.5)	22.3 (72.1)	23.6 (74.5)	19.1 (66.4)
Mean monthly sunshine hours	176.7	162.4	213.9	264.0	300.7	303.0	319.3	325.5	297.0	294.5	255.0	198.4	3,110.4
Mean daily sunshine hours	5.7	5.8	6.9	8.8	9.7	10.1	10.3	10.5	9.9	9.5	8.5	6.5	8.5

Climate data for Tennant Creek (Köppen BSh)
Month	Jan	Feb	Mar	Apr	May	Jun	Jul	Aug	Sep	Oct	Nov	Dec	Year
Record high °C (°F)	45.6 (114.1)	43.2 (109.8)	42.5 (108.5)	38.4 (101.1)	36.8 (98.2)	34.0 (93.2)	34.7 (94.5)	36.0 (96.8)	39.4 (102.9)	41.9 (107.4)	43.4 (110.1)	45.4 (113.7)	45.6 (114.1)
Mean maximum °C (°F)	40.7 (105.3)	39.9 (103.8)	37.9 (100.2)	35.9 (96.6)	31.8 (89.2)	29.5 (85.1)	29.2 (84.6)	32.2 (90.0)	36.6 (97.9)	39.0 (102.2)	40.2 (104.4)	41.0 (105.8)	41.0 (105.8)
Mean daily maximum °C (°F)	36.7 (98.1)	35.8 (96.4)	34.8 (94.6)	32.4 (90.3)	27.7 (81.9)	24.8 (76.6)	25.1 (77.2)	27.6 (81.7)	32.5 (90.5)	35.2 (95.4)	36.9 (98.4)	37.0 (98.6)	32.2 (90.0)
Daily mean °C (°F)	30.9 (87.6)	30.2 (86.4)	29.2 (84.6)	26.7 (80.1)	22.1 (71.8)	19.0 (66.2)	18.9 (66.0)	21.0 (69.8)	25.8 (78.4)	28.6 (83.5)	30.6 (87.1)	31.0 (87.8)	26.2 (79.1)
Mean daily minimum °C (°F)	25.0 (77.0)	24.5 (76.1)	23.5 (74.3)	20.9 (69.6)	16.4 (61.5)	13.2 (55.8)	12.7 (54.9)	14.4 (57.9)	19.1 (66.4)	22.0 (71.6)	24.2 (75.6)	25.0 (77.0)	20.1 (68.1)
Mean minimum °C (°F)	22.2 (72.0)	22.1 (71.8)	20.7 (69.3)	17.0 (62.6)	12.1 (53.8)	8.8 (47.8)	8.9 (48.0)	10.3 (50.5)	14.3 (57.7)	17.9 (64.2)	20.5 (68.9)	21.8 (71.2)	8.8 (47.8)
Record low °C (°F)	17.2 (63.0)	17.2 (63.0)	14.7 (58.5)	12.0 (53.6)	6.7 (44.1)	5.6 (42.1)	6.0 (42.8)	6.6 (43.9)	8.3 (46.9)	11.6 (52.9)	15.9 (60.6)	15.7 (60.3)	5.6 (42.1)
Average precipitation mm (inches)	128.2 (5.05)	132.9 (5.23)	45.7 (1.80)	15.0 (0.59)	8.1 (0.32)	4.1 (0.16)	3.9 (0.15)	2.4 (0.09)	5.0 (0.20)	16.9 (0.67)	45.7 (1.80)	86.8 (3.42)	494.7 (19.48)
Average precipitation days (≥ 1 mm)	8.2	8.0	3.3	1.1	1.0	0.7	0.5	0.2	1.1	2.5	3.9	6.7	37.2
Average afternoon relative humidity (%)	33	37	28	24	26	26	22	17	17	19	22	29	25
Average dew point °C (°F)	13.4 (56.1)	14.9 (58.8)	10.4 (50.7)	6.5 (43.7)	3.9 (39.0)	2.1 (35.8)	−0.2 (31.6)	−1.3 (29.7)	1.5 (34.7)	3.0 (37.4)	7.5 (45.5)	11.5 (52.7)	6.1 (43.0)
Mean monthly sunshine hours	285.2	257.1	291.4	297.0	303.8	294.0	313.1	331.7	309.0	313.1	294.0	275.9	3,565.3
Mean daily sunshine hours	9.2	9.1	9.4	9.9	9.8	9.8	10.1	10.7	10.3	10.1	9.8	8.9	9.8
Source: Australian Bureau of Meteorology

Climate data for Alice Springs (Köppen BWh)
Month	Jan	Feb	Mar	Apr	May	Jun	Jul	Aug	Sep	Oct	Nov	Dec	Year
Record high °C (°F)	45.6 (114.1)	44.7 (112.5)	42.7 (108.9)	39.9 (103.8)	35.0 (95.0)	31.6 (88.9)	31.8 (89.2)	35.2 (95.4)	38.8 (101.8)	42.6 (108.7)	44.9 (112.8)	45.7 (114.3)	45.7 (114.3)
Mean maximum °C (°F)	41.5 (106.7)	40.1 (104.2)	38.4 (101.1)	34.6 (94.3)	29.6 (85.3)	26.2 (79.2)	26.6 (79.9)	30.0 (86.0)	35.0 (95.0)	38.0 (100.4)	40.0 (104.0)	40.5 (104.9)	41.5 (106.7)
Mean daily maximum °C (°F)	37.1 (98.8)	35.8 (96.4)	33.5 (92.3)	29.3 (84.7)	23.6 (74.5)	20.1 (68.2)	20.7 (69.3)	23.5 (74.3)	28.8 (83.8)	31.9 (89.4)	34.4 (93.9)	35.7 (96.3)	29.5 (85.2)
Daily mean °C (°F)	29.7 (85.5)	28.5 (83.3)	25.7 (78.3)	21.1 (70.0)	15.8 (60.4)	12.4 (54.3)	12.3 (54.1)	14.7 (58.5)	20.0 (68.0)	23.4 (74.1)	26.4 (79.5)	28.2 (82.8)	21.5 (70.7)
Mean daily minimum °C (°F)	22.3 (72.1)	21.1 (70.0)	17.9 (64.2)	12.9 (55.2)	8.0 (46.4)	4.7 (40.5)	3.9 (39.0)	5.8 (42.4)	11.2 (52.2)	14.9 (58.8)	18.3 (64.9)	20.7 (69.3)	13.5 (56.2)
Mean minimum °C (°F)	17.2 (63.0)	16.2 (61.2)	12.1 (53.8)	7.2 (45.0)	2.4 (36.3)	−0.7 (30.7)	−1.4 (29.5)	0.3 (32.5)	4.5 (40.1)	8.4 (47.1)	12.4 (54.3)	15.2 (59.4)	−1.4 (29.5)
Record low °C (°F)	10.0 (50.0)	8.5 (47.3)	6.1 (43.0)	1.4 (34.5)	−2.7 (27.1)	−6.0 (21.2)	−7.5 (18.5)	−4.1 (24.6)	−1.0 (30.2)	1.3 (34.3)	3.5 (38.3)	9.3 (48.7)	−7.5 (18.5)
Average rainfall mm (inches)	48.9 (1.93)	40.7 (1.60)	19.9 (0.78)	19.9 (0.78)	17.5 (0.69)	10.3 (0.41)	13.0 (0.51)	3.8 (0.15)	7.8 (0.31)	18.7 (0.74)	33.0 (1.30)	41.3 (1.63)	274.8 (10.83)
Average rainy days (≥ 1 mm)	3.7	3.2	2.0	1.4	1.9	1.5	1.4	0.9	1.3	2.4	3.9	5.0	28.6
Average relative humidity (%)	27.0	32.5	28.0	31.0	41.5	48.5	43.0	31.5	24.0	23.0	26.0	27.5	32.0
Average dew point °C (°F)	8.0 (46.4)	9.6 (49.3)	6.1 (43.0)	4.3 (39.7)	3.7 (38.7)	2.9 (37.2)	0.8 (33.4)	−1.1 (30.0)	−0.2 (31.6)	0.5 (32.9)	4.5 (40.1)	6.6 (43.9)	3.8 (38.8)
Mean monthly sunshine hours	316.2	274.0	297.6	291.0	266.6	252.0	285.2	313.3	303.0	316.2	297.0	294.5	3,506.6
Mean daily sunshine hours	10.2	9.7	9.6	9.7	8.6	8.4	9.2	10.1	10.1	10.2	9.9	9.5	9.6
Source: Australian Bureau of Meteorology

== Coastal boundaries ==
In the Top End of the Territory is a 5500 km coastline, extending from the Joseph Bonaparte Gulf Timor Sea in the west to the Gulf of Carpentaria in the east. The various islands make up another 5500 km of coastline, resulting in a total of almost 11,000 km.

The southern part of the Territory (Central Australia) is extremely arid. Alice Springs and the surrounding communities make the total population of Central Australia around 60,000 people. There are also large Cattle Stations and significant areas protected around the area. Major transportation in Central Australia mainly comes from road and rail. There are many very small settlements scattered across the Territory but the larger population centres are located on the single sealed road that links Darwin to southern Australia, the Stuart Highway, known to locals simply as "the track".

== Geographical features ==
The coastline in the Top End includes three of Australia's largest islands, Groote Eylandt, Bathurst Island and the largest, Melville Island. The highest point in the Territory is Mount Zeil at 1,531 metres (5021.68 ft) and is situated in the MacDonnell Ranges. In the northern part of the territory lies Kakadu National Park, that features wetlands and native wildlife. To the north of that is the Arafura Sea, and to the east Arnhem Land, whose regional centre is Maningrida on the Liverpool River delta.

Much of the Territory is relatively flat, but has some disconnected ranges, including the sandstone plateau of western Arnhem Land. Long mountain ranges are more a feature of Central Australia, these include the MacDonnell Ranges, the Petermann Ranges, and Harts Range. The Northern Territory also has the natural rock formations of Uluru and Kata Tjuta, which are sacred to the local Aboriginal people.

The northern portion of the territory is principally tropical savannas, composed of several distinct ecoregions – Arnhem Land tropical savanna, Carpentaria tropical savanna, Kimberley tropical savanna, Victoria Plains tropical savanna, and Mitchell Grass Downs. The southern portion of the territory is covered in deserts and xeric shrublands, including the Great Sandy-Tanami desert, Simpson Desert, and Central Ranges xeric scrub. Each ecoregion consists of one or more IBRA regions.

The Northern Territory has the two largest deserts in Australia, the Tanami Desert (184,500 km)^{2} in the northern part of the Territory, and the Simpson Desert (176,500 km)^{2} of Central Australia.

There is a series of river systems in the Northern Territory that include Alligator Rivers, Daly River (with its major tributary the Katherine River), Finke River, McArthur River, Roper River, Todd River and Victoria River. The Victoria River is the longest river in the Northern Territory and flows for 560 kilometres (350 mi). The Hay River is east of Alice Springs, with the Marshall River, Arthur Creek, Camel Creek and Bore Creek as tributaries.
