= Great Sandy Island =

Great Sandy Island may refer to:

- K'gari (Fraser Island), formerly known briefly as Great Sandy Island
- Great Sandy Island (Western Australia), an island off the Pilbara coast
