= Swainsona decurrens =

Scientific classification
- Kingdom: Plantae
- Clade: Tracheophytes
- Clade: Angiosperms
- Clade: Eudicots
- Clade: Rosids
- Order: Fabales
- Family: Fabaceae
- Subfamily: Faboideae
- Genus: Swainsona
- Species: S. decurrens

Binomial name
- Swainsona decurrens A.T.Lee

Species of legume

Swainsona decurrens is a species of flowering plant in the family Fabaceae and is endemic to northern inland areas of Australia. It is an erect annual with imparipinnate leaves usually with 15 to 19 narrowly elliptical leaflets and racemes of 20 to 30 red or purple flowers.

== Description ==
Swainsona decurrens is an erect annual plant, that typically grows to a height of less about 50 cm (20 in) with robust stems often more than 5 mm (0.20 in) in diameter. Its leaves are imparipinnate, 5–15 mm (0.20–0.59 in) long on a short petiole with 20 to 30 narrowly elliptical leaflets mostly 10–30 mm (0.39–1.18 in) long and 2–10 mm (0.079–0.394 in) wide. There are lance-shaped stipules more than 10 mm (0.39 in) long at the base of the petiole. The flowers are arranged in racemes 150–200 mm (5.9–7.9 in) of 10 to 20 on a peduncle 1.0–1.5 mm (0.039–0.059 in) long, each flower 8–10 mm (0.31–0.39 in) long. The sepals are joined at the base, forming a tube 2–3 mm (0.079–0.118 in) long, the sepal lobes about the same length as the tube. The petals are red or purple, the standard petal 8–10 mm (0.31–0.39 in) long, the wings 7–9 mm (0.28–0.35 in) long, and the keel 8–10 mm (0.31–0.39 in) long and about 3 mm (0.12 in) wide. Flowering occurs from May to September, and the fruit is an almost round pod 5–8 mm (0.20–0.31 in) long with the remains of a strongly curved style about 5 mm (0.20 in) long.

== Taxonomy and naming ==
Swainsona decurrens was first formally described in 1948 by Alma Theodora Lee in Contributions from the New South Wales National Herbarium, from specimens collected south of Marble Bar. The specific epithet (decurrens) means "decurrent".

== Distribution and habitat ==
This species of pea grows in sandy or stony soil in the Gascoyne, Little Sandy Desert and Pilbara bioregions of northern inland Western Australia.
