= Great Sandy =

Great Sandy may refer to:

- Great Sandy Desert, Western Australia
- High Desert (Oregon), United States, called Great Sandy Desert in the 19th century
- Great Sandy Island (Western Australia)
- Fraser Island, Australia, known for a short period as Great Sandy Island
- Great Sandy Strait, Australia
