= Hay River =

Hay River may refer to:

== Places ==
- Hay River, Northwest Territories
- Hay River, Wisconsin

== Rivers ==
- Hay River (Wisconsin)
- Hay River (Canada), a river in Alberta and Northwest Territories, Canada
- Hay River, Northern Territory, Australia
- Hay River (Western Australia), a river in south-western Australia
