= Cape York Peninsula tropical savanna =

Terrestrial ecoregion in Australia

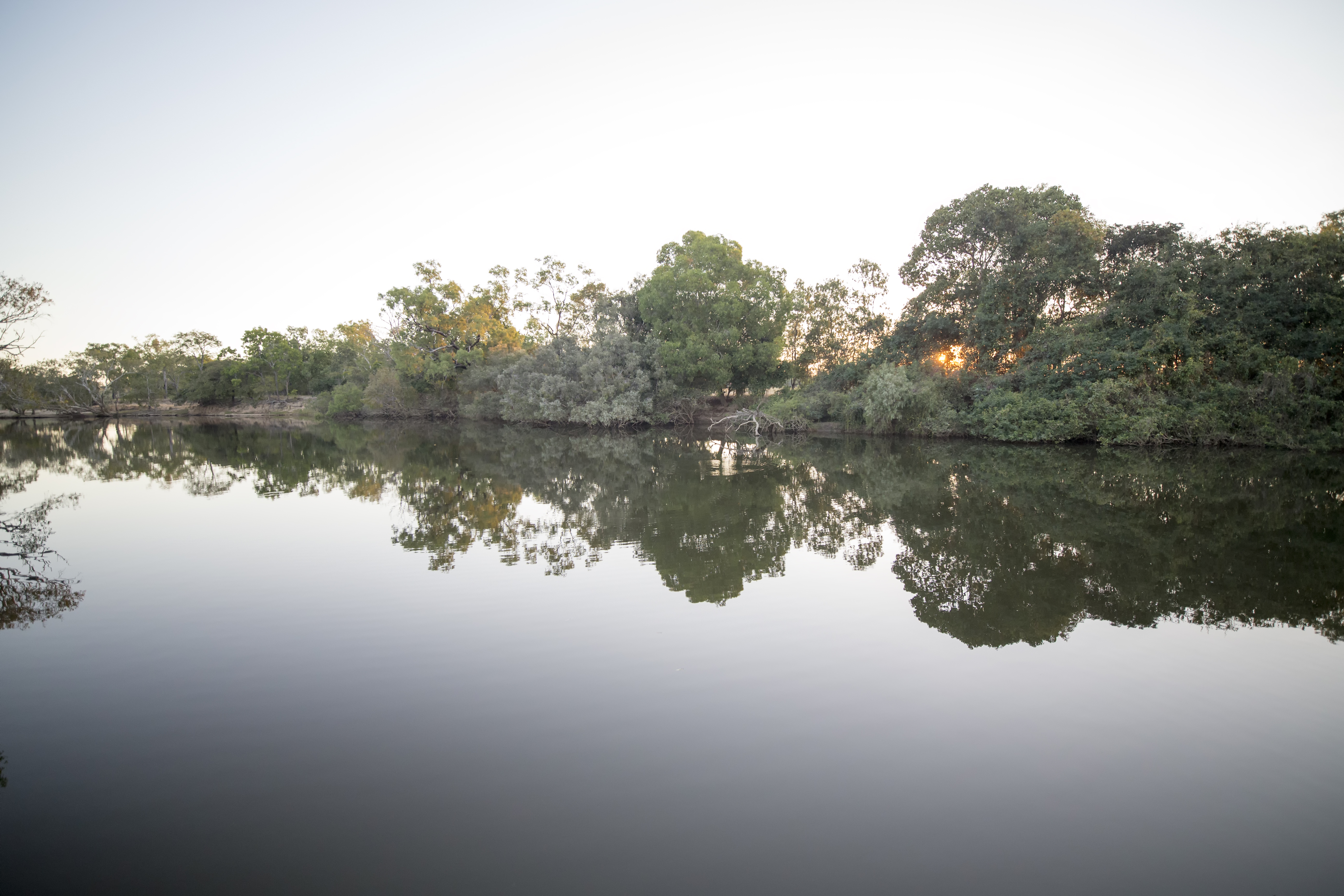
- Coleman River (Queensland)

- Map of the Cape York Peninsula tropical savanna ecoregion.

Ecology
- Realm: Australasian
- Biome: tropical and subtropical grasslands, savannas, and shrublands
- Borders: Carpentaria tropical savanna; Einasleigh Uplands savanna, Queensland tropical rain forests

Geography
- Area: 121,160 km^{2} (46,780 sq mi)
- Country: Australia
- States: Queensland; Torres Strait Regional Authority
- Coordinates: 13.5°S 142.6°E

Conservation
- Conservation status: Relatively stable/intact
- Protected: 35,713 km² (29%)

The Cape York Peninsula tropical savanna is a tropical grasslands, savannas, and shrublands ecoregion in northern Australia. It occupies the Cape York Peninsula in Queensland, mainland Australia's northernmost point. It is coterminous with the Cape York Peninsula (code CYP), an interim Australian bioregion.

== Geography ==
The ecoregion covers the northern portion of the Cape York Peninsula, along with the adjacent Torres Strait Islands. The Coral Sea lies to the east of the peninsula, and the Gulf of Carpentaria is to the west. The ecoregion is bounded by the Carpentaria tropical savanna ecoregion to the southwest, Einasleigh Uplands savanna to the south, and Queensland tropical rain forests to the southeast.

The west of the region is dominated in the south by an extensive Tertiary sand sheet dissected by the drainage systems of the Holroyd Plain, the Tertiary laterite of the Weipa Plateau, and the low rises of Mesozoic sandstones, while the northern section consists of the Weipa Plateau together with extensive coastal plains along the Gulf of Carpentaria. To the east lie aeolian dunefields. Along the eastern margin the Coen-Yambo Inlier, which includes the Iron and McIlwraith ranges, has complex geology of volcanic, metamorphic and acid intrusive rocks. The subregion of the Battle Camp Sandstones, formed from deeply dissected plateaus, lies in the southeast of the region. The Laura Lowlands, composed of sands and silts and colluvial and alluvial clays, lies between the Coen-Yambo Inlier and Battle Camp Sandstones, in the catchment of the Normanby River.

The northern end of the Great Dividing Range runs through the ecoregion, parallel to the east coast of the peninsula. 15 freshwater drainage basins or watersheds overlap the ecoregion. Rivers that drain eastwards to the Coral Sea include the Olive, Pascoe, Lockhart, Stewart, Hann, Normanby, Jeannie, and Endeavour, and the Jardine, Pennefather, Ducie, Wenlock, Watson, Archer, Ward, Holroyd, Coleman, and Alice rivers drain westwards to the Gulf of Carpentaria.

=== Subregions ===
In the IBRA system, Cape York Peninsula (CYP) has nine sub-regions:

IBRA regions and subregions: IBRA7
IBRA subregion	IBRA code	Area	
IBRA subregion	IBRA code	ha	acres
Coen-Yambo Inlier	CYP01	2,312,126	5,713,390
Starke Coastal Lowlands	CYP02	512,498	1,266,410
Cape York-Torres Strait	CYP03	94,367	233,190
Jardine-Pascoe Sandstones	CYP04	1,444,223	3,568,750
Battle Camp Sandstones	CYP05	504,409	1,246,420
Laura Lowlands	CYP06	1,791,228	4,426,220
Weipa Plateau	CYP07	2,848,753	7,039,420
Northern Holroyd Plain	CYP08	2,464,074	6,088,860
Coastal Plains	CYP09	284,780	703,700

== Climate ==
The climate is tropical, humid or maritime, with rainfall varying from 1000 mm to 1600 mm, including some high-rainfall areas at high elevations.

== Flora ==
Plant communities are diverse, and include woodlands, heathlands, sedgelands, mangroves, and vine forests (including both semi-deciduous vine forests on the eastern ranges and deciduous vine thickets on western slopes). In all 39 distinct vegetation types are recognised.

The predominant plant community is eucalypt woodlands and savannas, which cover 64% of the ecoregion's area, with Darwin stringybark (Eucalyptus tetrodonta) as the dominant tree in 36% of the ecoregion. Open woodlands of Melaleuca spp. cover 15% of the ecoregion.

Rainforests and vine thickets cover smaller areas, concentrated along the east coast, and represent 20% of Australia's total. Rainforests and vine thickets are of several different types, which vary with climate and soils. Littoral rainforests and coastal vine thickets extend along the east coast southwards of Princess Charlotte Bay, including offshore islands like the Flinders Group. Characteristic species include beach cherry (Eugenia reinwardtiana) and Micromelum minutum.

The Iron and McIlwraith Ranges are home to the most extensive rainforests and vine forests in the ecoregion, which grow on older metamorphic rocks on the eastern side of the escarpment. These include evergreen notophyll vine forests. These forests have floristic affinities to New Guinea.

Heathland of low-growing plants is common on nutrient-poor sandy soils formed from eroded granite, including large areas of the Iron and McIlwraith ranges.

Most of the ecoregion's watersheds are relatively intact, home to freshwater aquatic species and often lined with dense riparian forests.

Mangrove forests are found in the north east and along the estuaries on the coasts. 36 mangrove species are recorded on the peninsula.

40% of the ecoregion's plant species are shared with New Guinea. There are also 330 bioregionally endemic plant species and five bioregionally endemic plant genera, including Wodyetia, Jedda, and Indagator.

== Fauna ==
Birds endemic to the Cape York Peninsula include the buff-breasted buttonquail (Turnix olivii), golden-shouldered parrot (Psephotus chrysopterygius), lovely fairywren (Malurus amabilis), white-streaked honeyeater (Trichodere cockerelli), and yellow-spotted honeyeater (Meliphaga notata). Several species are native to both the northern Cape York Peninsula and New Guinea, including the palm cockatoo (Probosciger aterrimus), southern cassowary (Casuarius casuarius), yellow-billed kingfisher (Syma torotoro), Papuan pitta (Erythropitta macklotii), trumpet manucode (Phonygammus keraudrenii), magnificent riflebird (Ptiloris magnificus), fawn-breasted bowerbird (Chlamydera cerviniventris), and yellow-legged flycatcher (Kempiella griseoceps). The ecoregion is on important migration routes for both land birds and seabirds.

The spotted cuscus (Spilocuscus maculatus) and giant white-tailed rat (Uromys caudimaculatus) are native to the ecoregion and to New Guinea. The Cape York melomys (Melomys capensis) is a species of rat endemic to the ecoregion.

== Conservation and protected areas ==
Most of the ecoregion has infertile soil, which has limited the development of agriculture. Much of the ecoregion is used for livestock grazing, and overgrazing has degraded some areas. Introduced species, including feral pigs, cane toads, and invasive weeds, have endangered native species by predation, competition, and altering habitats. Non-Aboriginal settlers changed the ecoregion's fire regime, which has reduced and degraded some plant communities and habitats. Several Important Bird Areas in the ecoregion, including Lilyvale, Morehead River, Lockerbie Scrub, and Iron and McIlwraith ranges, are threatened by property and tourism development.

34.29% of the ecoregion is in protected areas. Protected areas in the ecoregion include Endeavour River National Park, Possession Island National Park, Mount Cook National Park, Alwal National Park, Jardine River National Park, and Annan River (Yuku Baja-Muliku) National Park. Protected areas on Aboriginal land include Apudthama National Park, Batavia National Park, Biniirr National Park, Bromley (Ampulin) National Park, Bromley (Kungkaychi) National Park, Cape Melville National Park, Daarrba National Park, Errk Oykangand National Park, Juunju Daarrba Nhirrpan National Park, Kulla National Park, Kutini-Payamu (Iron Range) National Park, Lama Lama National Park, Melsonby (Gaarraay) National Park, Muundhi (Jack River) National Park, Ngaynggarr National Park, Olkola National Park, Oyala Thumotang National Park, Rinyirru (Lakefield) National Park, Wuthathi (Shelburne Bay) National Park, and Kaanju Ngaachi Indigenous Protected Area.
