= Great Sandy–Tanami desert =

Ecoregion in Australia

Coordinates: 21°06′54″S 127°11′33″E

Great Sandy-Tanami desert
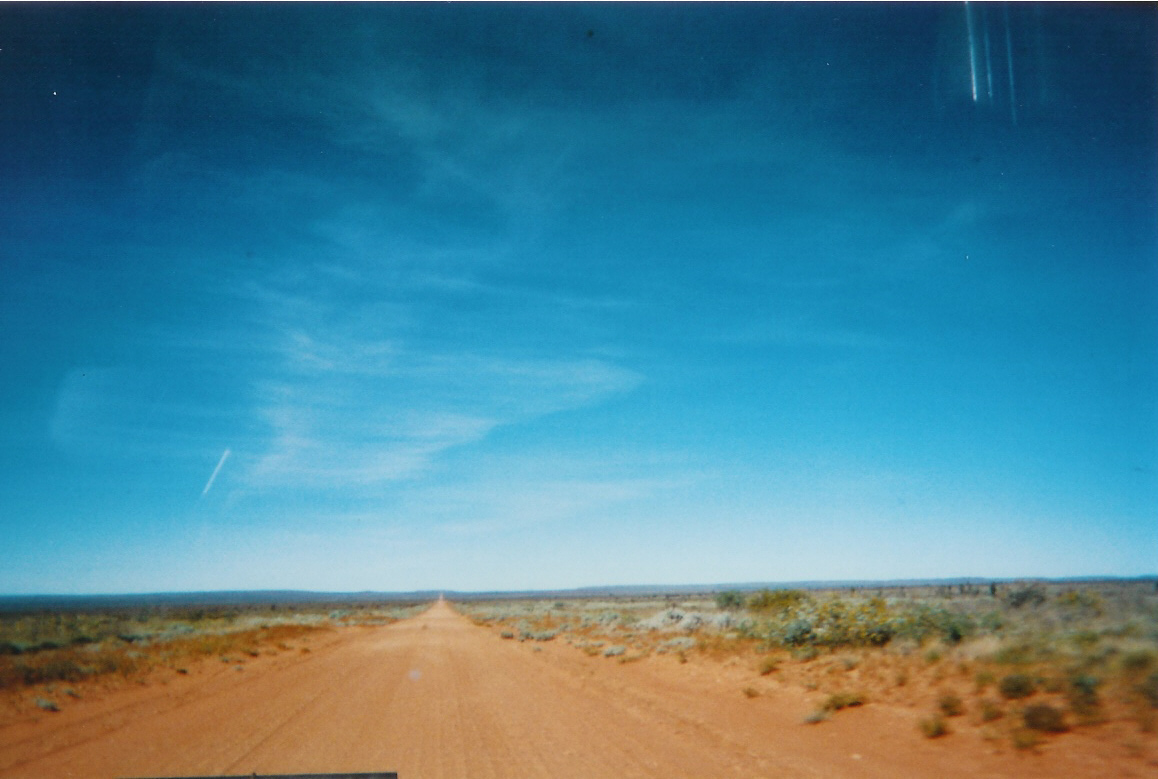
- Tanami desert, Australia

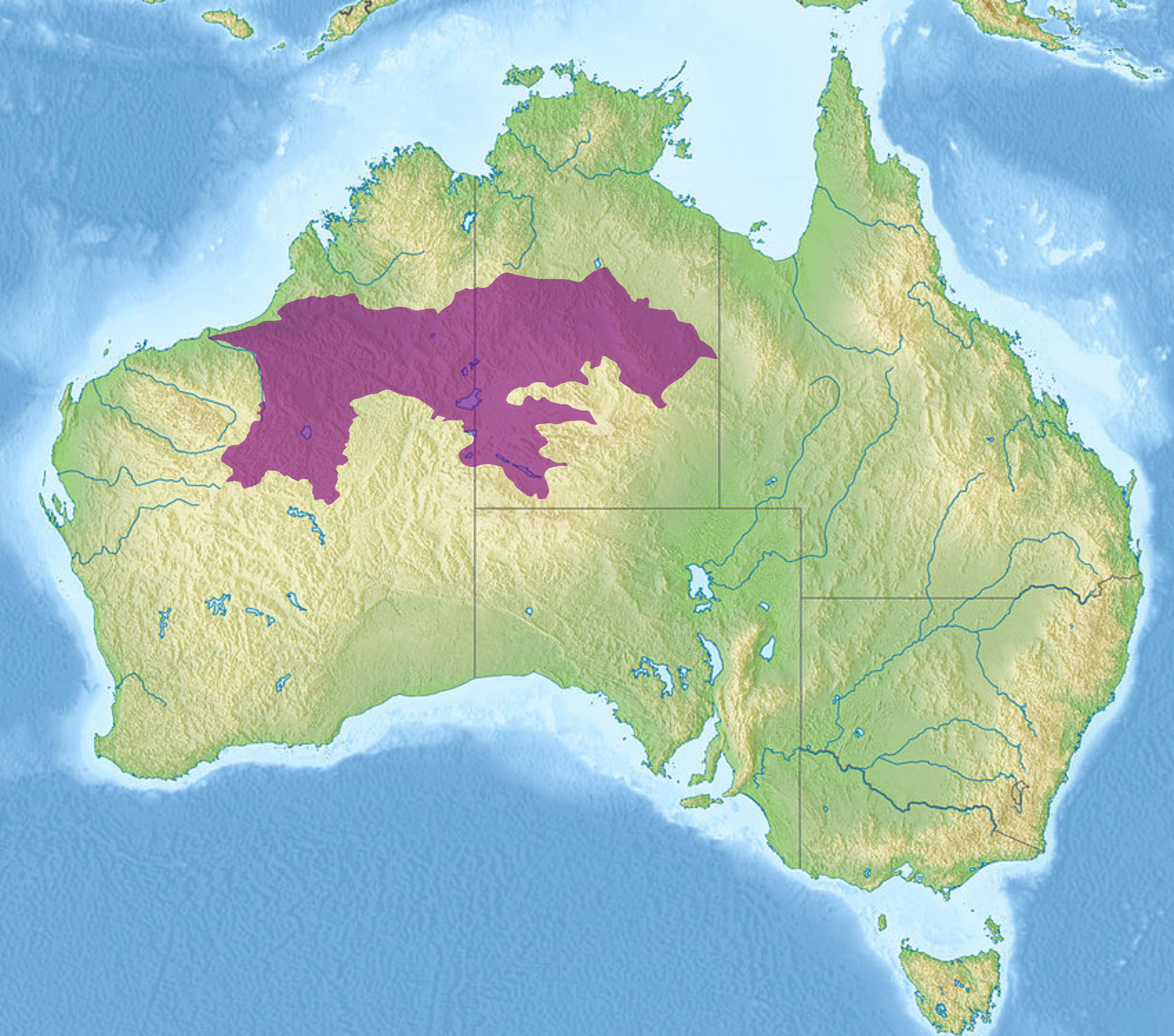
- Ecoregion territory (in purple)

Ecology
- Realm: Australasian
- Biome: deserts and xeric shrublands
- Borders: List: Central Ranges xeric scrub; Gibson Desert; Great Victoria Desert; Kimberley tropical savanna; Mitchell Grass Downs; Pilbara shrublands; Simpson Desert; Victoria Plains tropical savanna; Western Australian mulga shrublands

Geography
- Area: 823,784 km^{2} (318,065 mi^{2})
- Country: Australia
- States: Northern Territory; Western Australia

Conservation
- Conservation status: Relatively stable/intact
- Protected: 260,900 km² (32%)

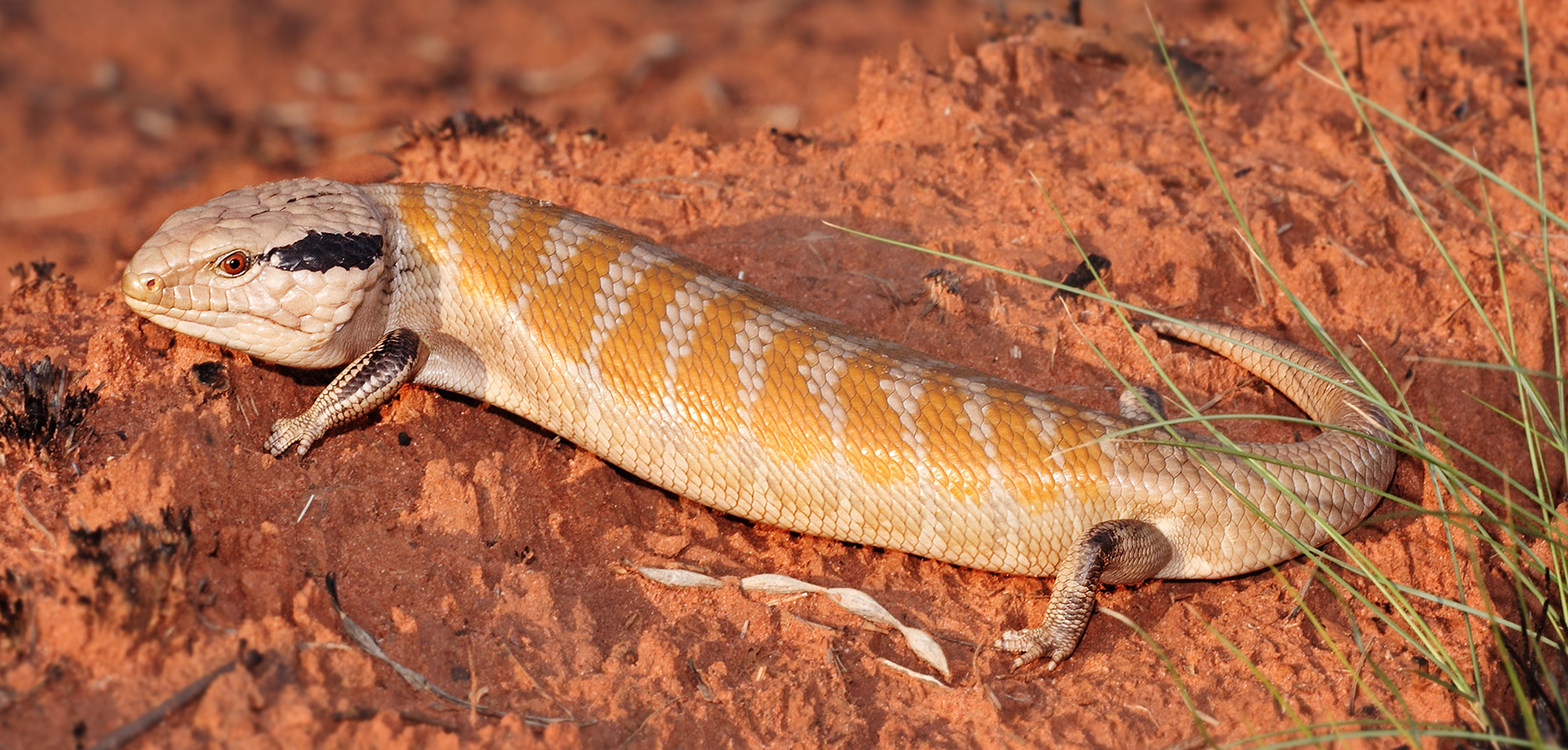
Centrailian-Bluetongue-skink in the Tanami Desert

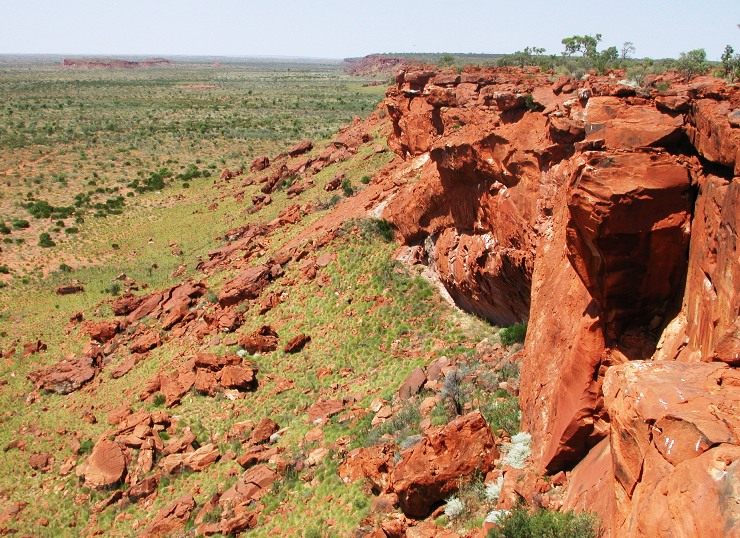
Little Sandy Desert

The Great Sandy–Tanami desert is a ecoregion of Western Australia extending into the Northern Territory. It is designated as a World Wildlife Fund region.

== Location and description ==
This very large ecoregion consists of the Little Sandy Desert, Great Sandy Desert, Tanami, and Davenport Murchison Ranges Interim Biogeographic Regionalisation for Australia (IBRA) regions. The landscape is desert sands with areas of wooded steppe and shrubby grassland. The Great Sandy Desert is a large area of red desert sand dunes, while the Tanami Desert to the east is flat sand broken up with areas of hills. One prominent landmark in the region is the large sandstone rock Uluru. The climate is hot and dry and the area is mostly uninhabited.

== Flora ==
The vegetation is very thin and consists of spinifex grass and saltbush shrubs that are adapted to the desert conditions. There are also occasional acacias and desert oaks.

== Fauna ==
Much of the wildlife of this hot climate is nocturnal including the rabbit-sized marsupial the Bilby and the Rufous hare-wallabies of the Tanami Desert. The wildlife of these deserts includes communities of wild camels, descendants of animals brought here as transport in earlier times.

== Protected areas ==
Protected areas in the ecoregion include Iytwelepenty / Davenport Range National Park, Karlamilyi National Park, and Uluṟu-Kata Tjuṯa National Park.
