= Pilbara shrublands =

Terrestrial ecoregion in Western Australia

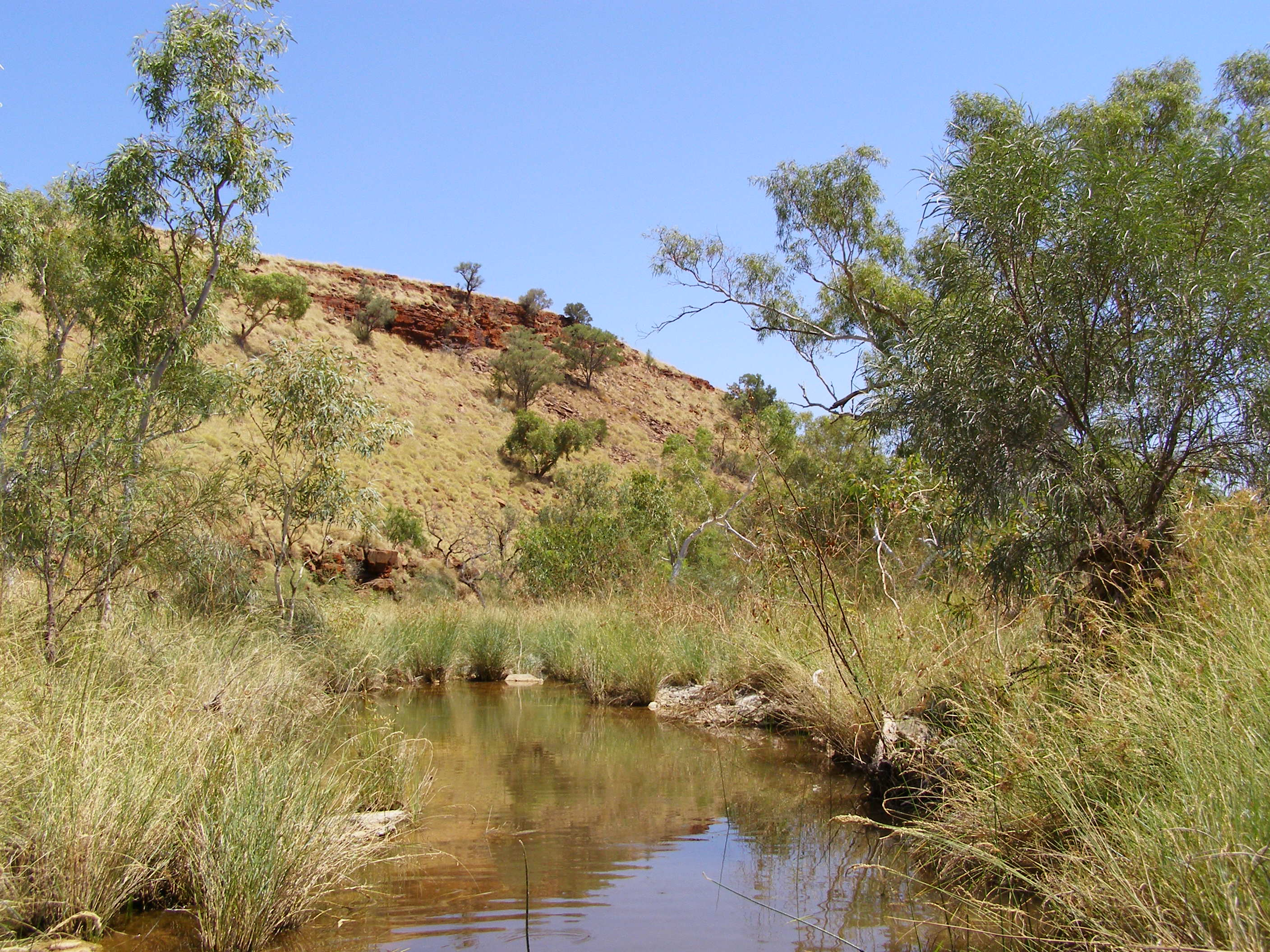
- Hamersley Range

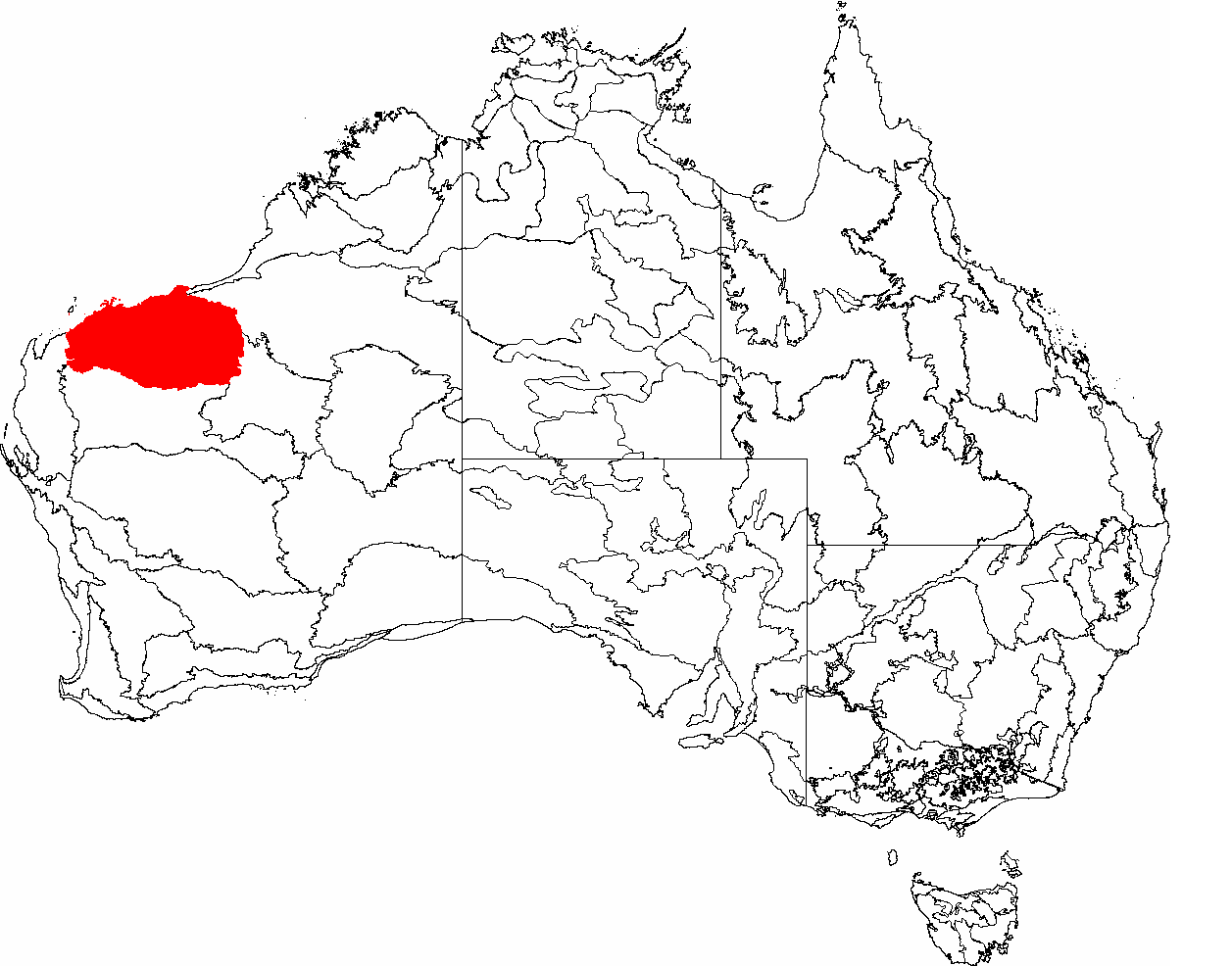
- Map of IBRA regions, with Pilbara in red.

Ecology
- Realm: Australasian
- Biome: deserts and xeric shrublands
- Borders: Carnarvon xeric shrublands; Great Sandy-Tanami desert; Kimberley tropical savanna, Western Australian mulga shrublands

Geography
- Area: 177,693 km^{2} (68,608 sq mi)
- Country: Australia
- States: Western Australia
- Coordinates: 21.7°S 118.7°E

Conservation
- Conservation status: Vulnerable
- Protected: 11,224 km^{2} (6%)

The Pilbara shrublands is a deserts and xeric shrublands ecoregion in Western Australia. It is coterminous with the Pilbara IBRA region. For other definitions and uses of "Pilbara region" see Pilbara.

== Geography ==
The Pilbara shrublands is bounded on the north by the Indian Ocean, and on the west, south, and east by other deserts and xeric shrubland ecoregions - the Carnarvon xeric shrublands to the west, the Western Australian mulga shrublands to the south, and the Great Sandy-Tanami desert to the east and northeast.

The Pilbara geographic region covers most of the ecoregion, and extends east into the Great Sandy desert.

The Hamersley Range, a region of mountain ranges and plateaus dissected by gorges, lies in the southern portion of the ecoregion. The Fortescue Plains extend east and west to the north of the Hamersley Range, forming the upper basin of the Fortescue River. The Chichester Plateau lies north of the Fortescue Plains. The Roebourne subregion encompasses the coastal plain along the Indian Ocean, including the Dampier Archipelago.

The ecoregion lies on the Pilbara craton, a block of ancient Archean rock. The Chichester region is characterized by exposed granite and greenstone basement rocks. The Hamersley region includes iron-rich carbonate sedimentary carbonate rocks over a volcanic substrate (the Fortescue formation) which rest on the older craton. The Fortescue basin and coastal plain are alluvial.

== Climate ==
The climate is tropical semi-desert. Rainfall averages 300 mm annually, typically from summer cyclonic storms and thunderstorms.

== Flora ==
In the Hamersley region, mulga woodland occurs on fine-textured valley soils, with Acacia aneura over the grasses Aristida spp. and Enneapogon spp. Snappy gum (Eucalyptus leucophloia) occurs with the grass Triodia brizoides on the skeletal soils of the ranges.

The Fortescue Plains include the northernmost mulga woodlands, along with short grasslands. Year-round watercourses and springs support stands of red river gum, (Eucalyptus camaldulensis refulgens), Melaleuca, and the palm Livistona alfredii. Sheltered gorges along the edge of the Chichester Plateau provide water and protection from fire, and support relict communities of Terminalia, Erythrina, and Ficus.

The Chichester Plateau is principally scrub steppe, with the shrub Acacia inaequilatera and the bunch grass Triodia wiseana. Scrub steppe also dominates the Roebourne coastal plain, with Acacia translucens and Triodia pungens.

"Fairy circles" (known as "linyji" in the Manyjilyjarra language and "mingkirri" in the Warlpiri language) which are circular patches of land barren of plants, varying between 22 and 12 metres (7 and 39 ft) in diameter and often encircled by a ring of grass, are found in the western part of the Great Sandy Desert. It has not yet been proven what causes these formations, but one theory suggests that they have been built and inhabited by Australian harvester termites since the Pleistocene.

== Fauna ==
Native animals include the red kangaroo (Osphranter rufus), bilby (Macrotis lagotis), northern quoll (Dasyurus hallucatus), Pilbara leaf-nosed bat (Rhinonicteris aurantia, Pilbara form), ghost bat (Macroderma gigas), Pilbara ningaui (Ningaui timealeyi), Pilbara olive python (Liasis olivaceus barroni), Pilbara bandy bandy (Vermicella snelli), and Airlie Island ctenotus (Ctenotus angusticeps).

Rothschild's rock-wallaby (Petrogale rothschildi), Pilbara rock monitor (Varanus pilbarensis), Pilbara death adder (Acanthophis wellsi), Pilbara toadlet (Uperoleia saxatilis), and the Pilbara threadtail (Nososticta pilbara) are endemic to the ecoregion.

== Subregions ==
IBRA regions and subregions: IBRA7
IBRA region / subregion	IBRA code	Area	States	scope="col" Location in Australia
Pilbara	PIL	17,823,126 hectares (44,041,900 acres)	WA	
Chichester	PIL01	8,374,728 hectares (20,694,400 acres)	WA	
Fortescue	PIL02	1,951,435 hectares (4,822,100 acres)	WA	
Hamersley	PIL03	5,634,727 hectares (13,923,710 acres)	WA	
Roebourne	PIL04	1,862,236 hectares (4,601,690 acres)	WA	

== Protected areas ==
6.47% of the ecoregion is in protected areas. Protected areas include:

- Barrow Island Nature Reserve
- Boodie, Double Middle Islands Nature Reserve
- Cane River Conservation Park
- Eighty Mile Beach Marine Park
- Great Sandy Island Nature Reserve
- Karijini National Park
- Lowendal Islands Nature Reserve
- Millstream Chichester National Park
- Montebello Islands Conservation Park
- Montebello Islands Marine Park
- Mungaroona Range Nature Reserve
- Murujuga National Park
