= Einasleigh Uplands =

Bioregion in Queensland, Australia

Coordinates: 18°28′47″S 144°07′54″E

Einasleigh Uplands Einasleigh Uplands savanna
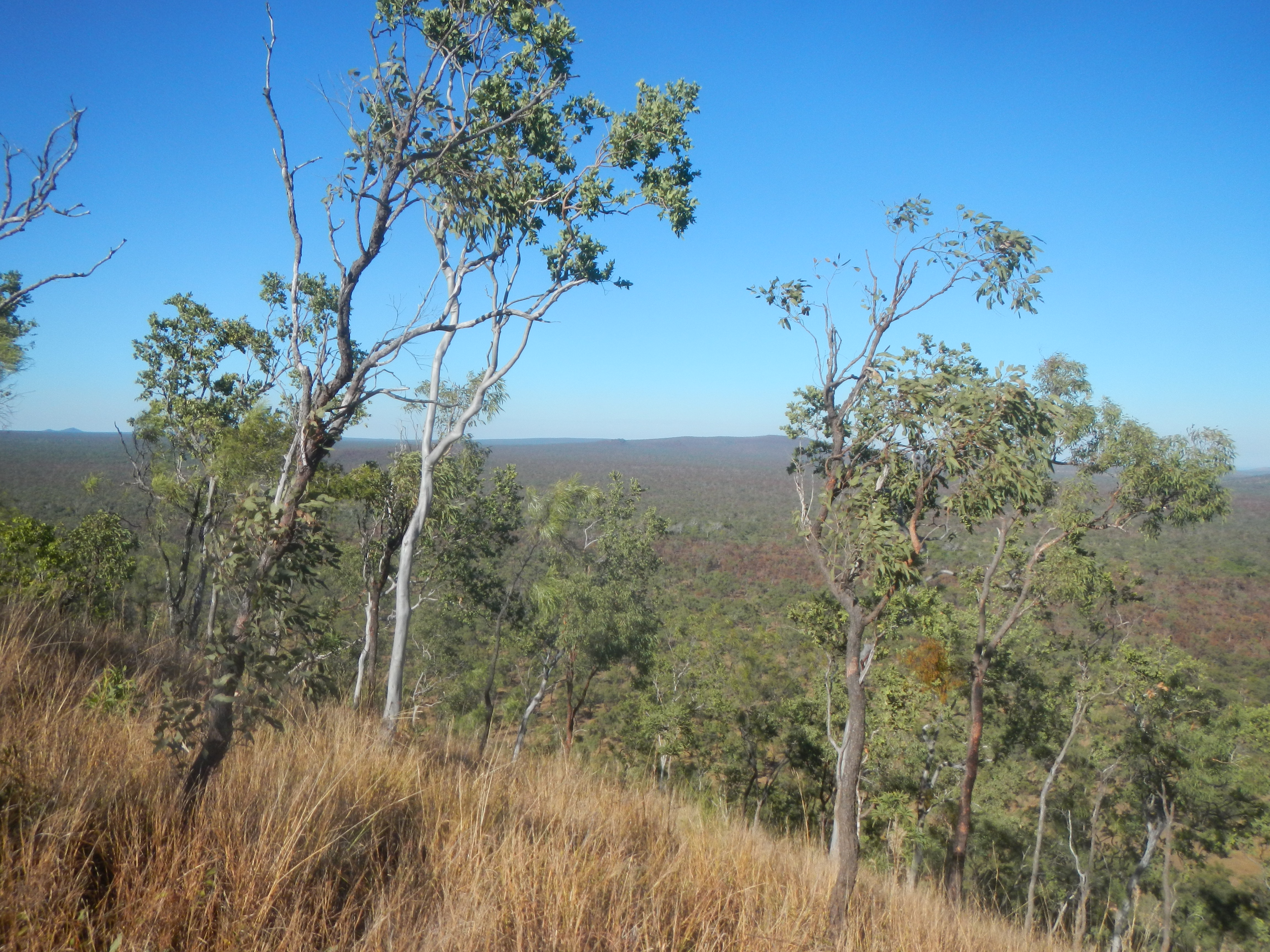
- View from Kalkani Crater, Undara Volcanic National Park

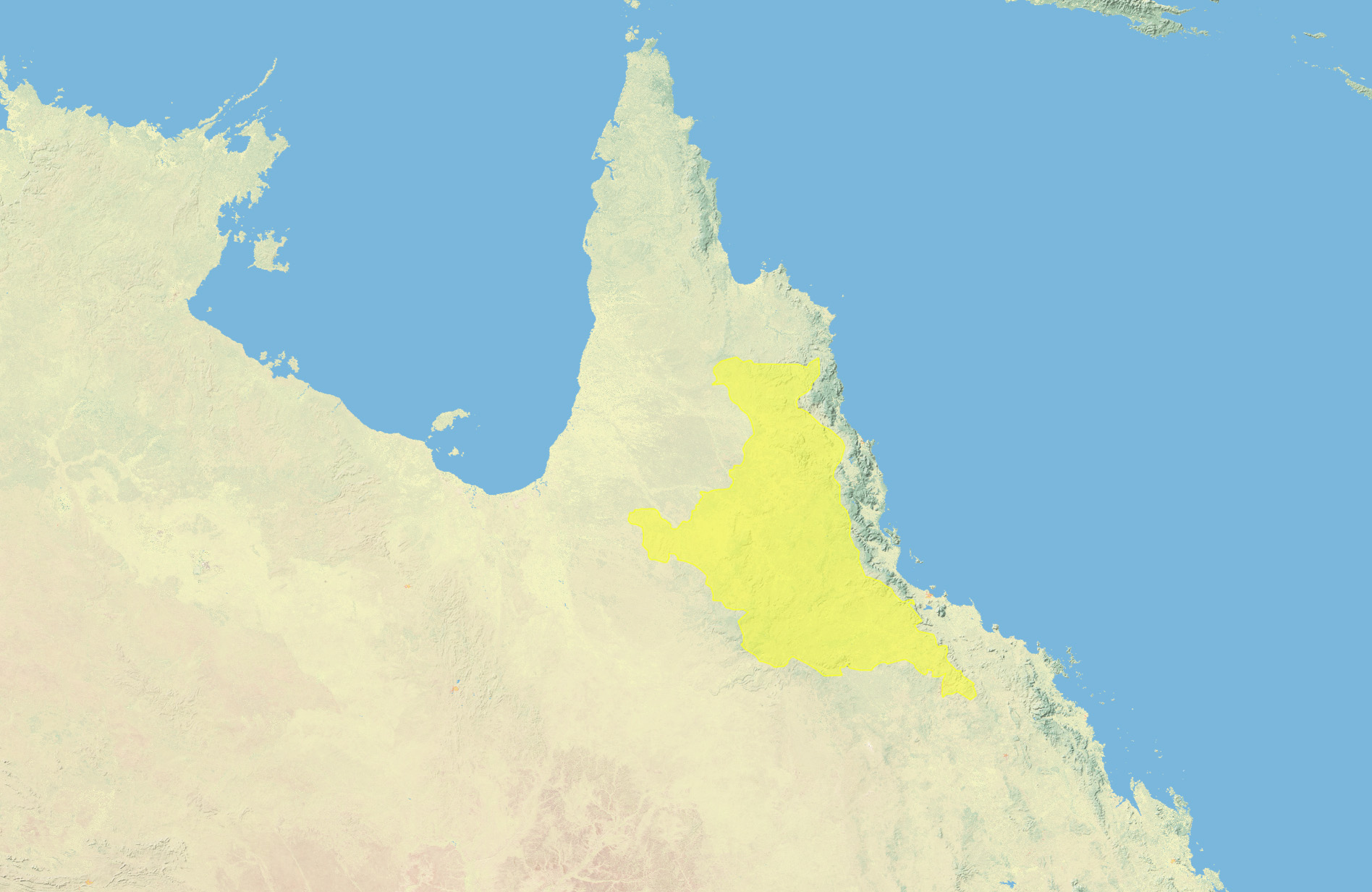
- IBRA 7 bioregion (in yellow); corresponds to WWF 'Einasleigh Uplands savanna' ecoregion

Ecology
- Realm: Australasian
- Biome: tropical and subtropical grasslands, savannas, and shrublands
- Borders: List: Brigalow tropical savanna; Cape York Peninsula tropical savanna; Carpentaria tropical savanna; Mitchell Grass Downs; Queensland tropical rain forests

Geography
- Area: 116,257 km^{2} (44,887 sq mi)
- Country: Australia
- States: Queensland

Conservation
- Conservation status: Relatively stable/intact
- Protected: 5,330 km² (5%)

The Einasleigh Uplands is an interim Australian bioregion, with vegetation consisting of savanna and woodland located on a large plateau in inland Queensland, Australia. It corresponds to the Einasleigh Uplands savanna ecoregion, as identified by the World Wildlife Fund.

== Location and description ==
This area is inland from the moist Queensland coast but is not as dry as the Brigalow Belt and the Mitchell Grass Downs savannas to the south, while the Cape York Peninsula to the north is lower-lying and wetter. The region contains a number of specialised habitats that add to the variety of wildlife found here. These include lava tubes and caves such as those of Chillagoe.

The uplands are an area of eroded volcanic rock on and to the west of the Atherton Tableland in the northern section of Australia's Great Dividing Range running inland as far as the town of Croydon in the southwest. The plateau is covered in grassland dotted with eucalyptus trees and cut through with ridges, gorges and lava tubes. The area has rich fertile soil. Natural features include the Great Basalt Wall of dried volcanic lava and the lava tubes of Undara Volcanic National Park.

Rivers that have their source in the uplands include the Flinders River which runs northwest to the Gulf of Carpentaria along with the Palmer, Mitchell and Gilbert-Einasleigh while the Burdekin and Herbert Rivers run south-east from the tablelands to the Coral Sea coast.

Urban areas include Herberton and Croydon.

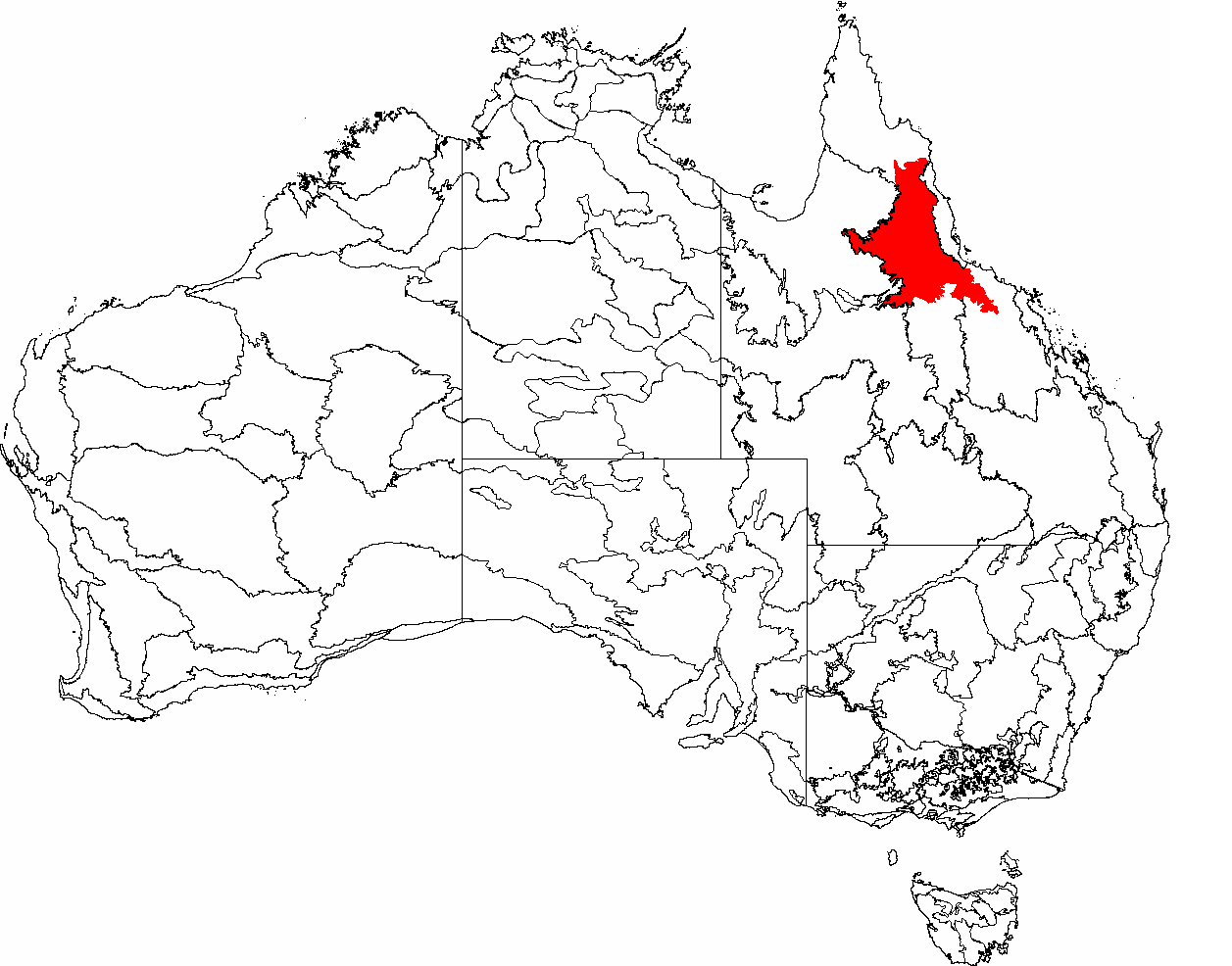
Einasleigh Uplands bioregion, defined by the IBRA 7.

== Climate ==
The climate is cooler than the coast with summer nights being as cool as 9 °C compared with 20 °C on the coast. The summer high temperatures are around 35 °C. There is a wet season between December and March.

== Flora ==
This stony upland habitat is dominated by ironbark eucalyptus woodland but there are wetlands and patches of rainforest too. Lava flows are home to stands of thicker forest.

== Fauna ==
These woodlands are home to many animals including a number of marsupials such as the antilopine kangaroo, the large eastern grey kangaroo and the near-endemic Godman's rock-wallaby and Mareeba rock-wallaby. There are a number of endemic mammals, reptiles and insects in the region especially in the more thickly forested areas where a large number of endemic reptiles occur. The caves and lava flows harbour specific wildlife of their own as do the wetter east-facing slopes of the uplands. Rivers such as the Burdekin have important populations of waterbirds as do the unique (to Australia) wetlands of Innot Hot Springs.

== Threats and preservation ==
The area has long been used for cattle ranching but apart from the heavily farmed Atherton Tableland is thinly populated so the landscape is well preserved although it has been changed by overgrazing, clearance for agriculture and the introduction of weeds. Some areas of the acacia gidgee (Acacia cambagei) in the southeast of the uplands have suffered in particular. There are a number of protected areas containing a good variety of the different types of habitat found in the region, including Undara and the Great Basalt Wall as well as Blackbraes National Park, Kinrara National Park, Littleton National Park, part of Bulleringa National Park and the caves of Chillagoe.

== See also ==
- Geography of Australia
- Interim Biogeographic Regionalisation for Australia
