= Queensland tropical rain forests =

Terrestrial ecoregion in Australia

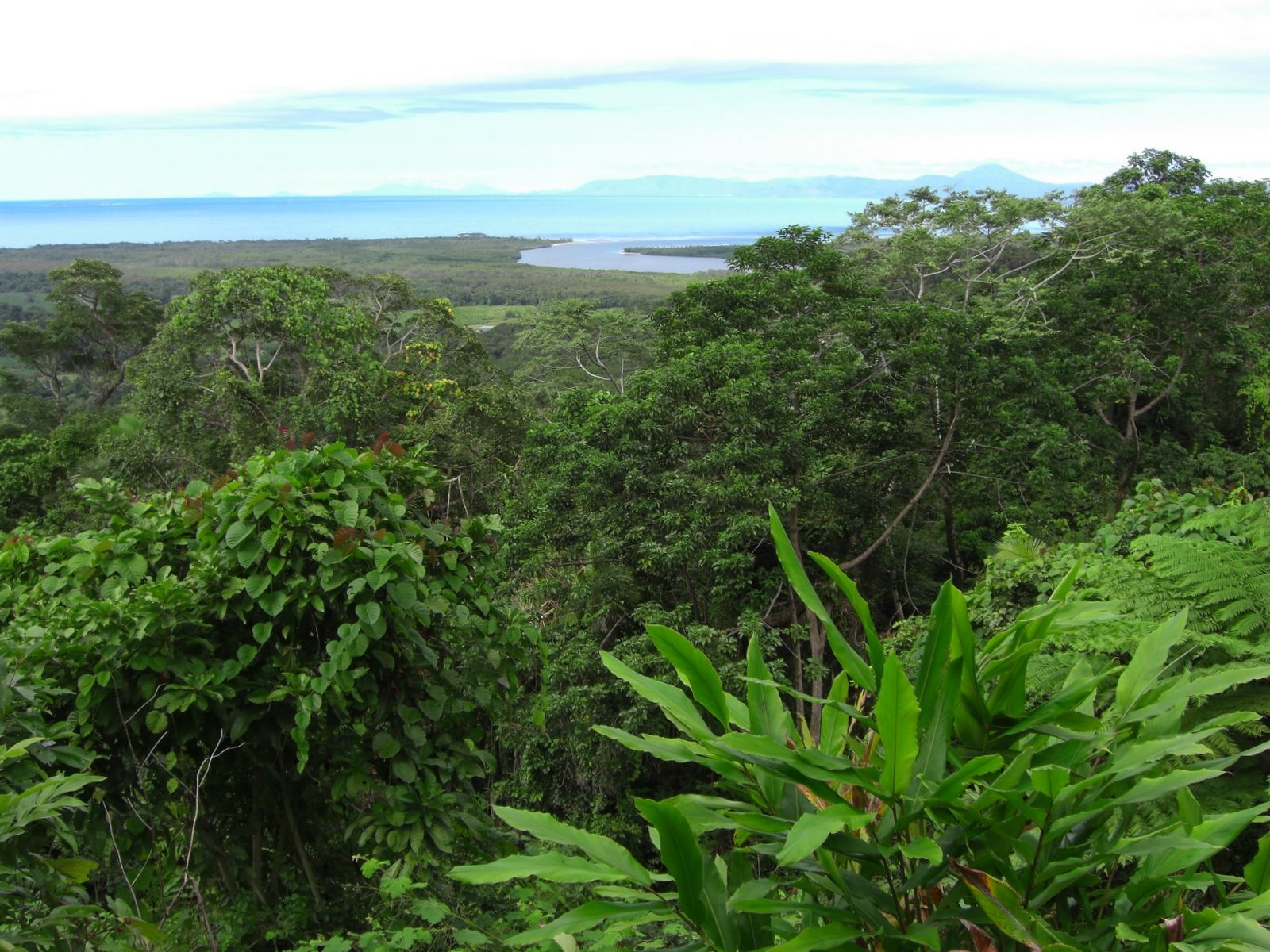
- Daintree Rainforest, Queensland

- Ecoregion territory (in purple)

Ecology
- Realm: Australasian realm
- Biome: tropical and subtropical moist broadleaf forests
- Borders: Brigalow tropical savanna; Cape York Peninsula tropical savanna; Einasleigh upland savanna

Geography
- Area: 33,129 km^{2} (12,791 mi^{2})
- Countries: Australia
- States: Queensland
- Coordinates: 21.25°S 148.75°E

Conservation
- Conservation status: Vulnerable
- Global 200: Queensland tropical rain forests
- Protected: 3,260 km^{2} (10%)

The Queensland tropical rain forests ecoregion (WWF ID: AA0117) covers a portion of the coast of Queensland in northeastern Australia and belongs to the Australasian realm. The forest contains the world's best living record of the major stages in the evolutionary history of the world's land plants, including most of the world's relict species of plants from the ancient supercontinent of Gondwana. The history of the evolution of marsupials and songbirds is also well represented.

== Location and description ==
The ecoregion covers 32,700 square kilometers (12,600 sq mi) of northeastern coastal Queensland, from the coast up a series of plateaus and tablelands to the mountains behind the coast. The ecoregion comprises three separate sections. The northern area, which includes Cairns, is the largest, from 15°30’ to 19°25’ south latitude. This northern section is also known as the Wet Tropics bioregion, and is just east of the Einasleigh Uplands. The middle section is centred on Mackay, Queensland, and the southern section is just south of Shoalwater Bay. These latter two sections correspond to the Central Mackay Coast bioregion and are bounded on the west by the Brigalow tropical savanna ecoregion. Elevations in the ecoregion rise from sea level to 1,477 metres, with a mean of 301 metres.

== Climate ==
The climate of the ecoregion is a borderline tropical rainforest climate (Af) and Dry-winter humid subtropical climate (Köppen climate classification (Cwa)). The latter climate is characterized as having no month averaging below 0 °C (32 °F), at least one month averaging above 22 °C (72 °F), and four months averaging over 10 °C (50 °F). Precipitation in the wet summer months is ten times or more the average of the winter months. In this particular ecoregion, annual precipitation is highly variable, with annual averages between 1,200 and 8,000 mm. The rainy season is November to April.

== Flora and fauna ==
The Queensland tropical rain forests are designated one of the Global 200 ecoregions. The ecoregion is the largest remnant of Australia's rain forest flora, home to ancient assemblage of plants, called the Antarctic flora, presently characteristic of New Zealand and southern Chile. Fossil pollen records indicate closed forest covered most of Australia between 50 and 100 million years ago. These forests represent the closest living remnant of the vegetation type from which all of Australia's unique vegetation developed. The vegetation remained across Australia and Antarctica until about 15 million years ago.

Currently, about 65% of the ecoregion is closed forest of broadleaf evergreens. Conifers of the southern hemisphere family Araucariaceae are the characteristic tree species. In the northern section of the ecoregion, kauri commonly form the forest canopy, with Agathis robusta most common at lower elevations, and A. microstachya and A. atropurpurea predominant at higher elevations. In the southern sections, Araucaria cunninghamii is predominant, with Araucaria bidwillii dominant in two small areas. Conifers in the family Podocarpaceae are also present, including genera Podocarpus and Sundacarpus. The forests are thick with vines, ferns, epiphytes, and palms.

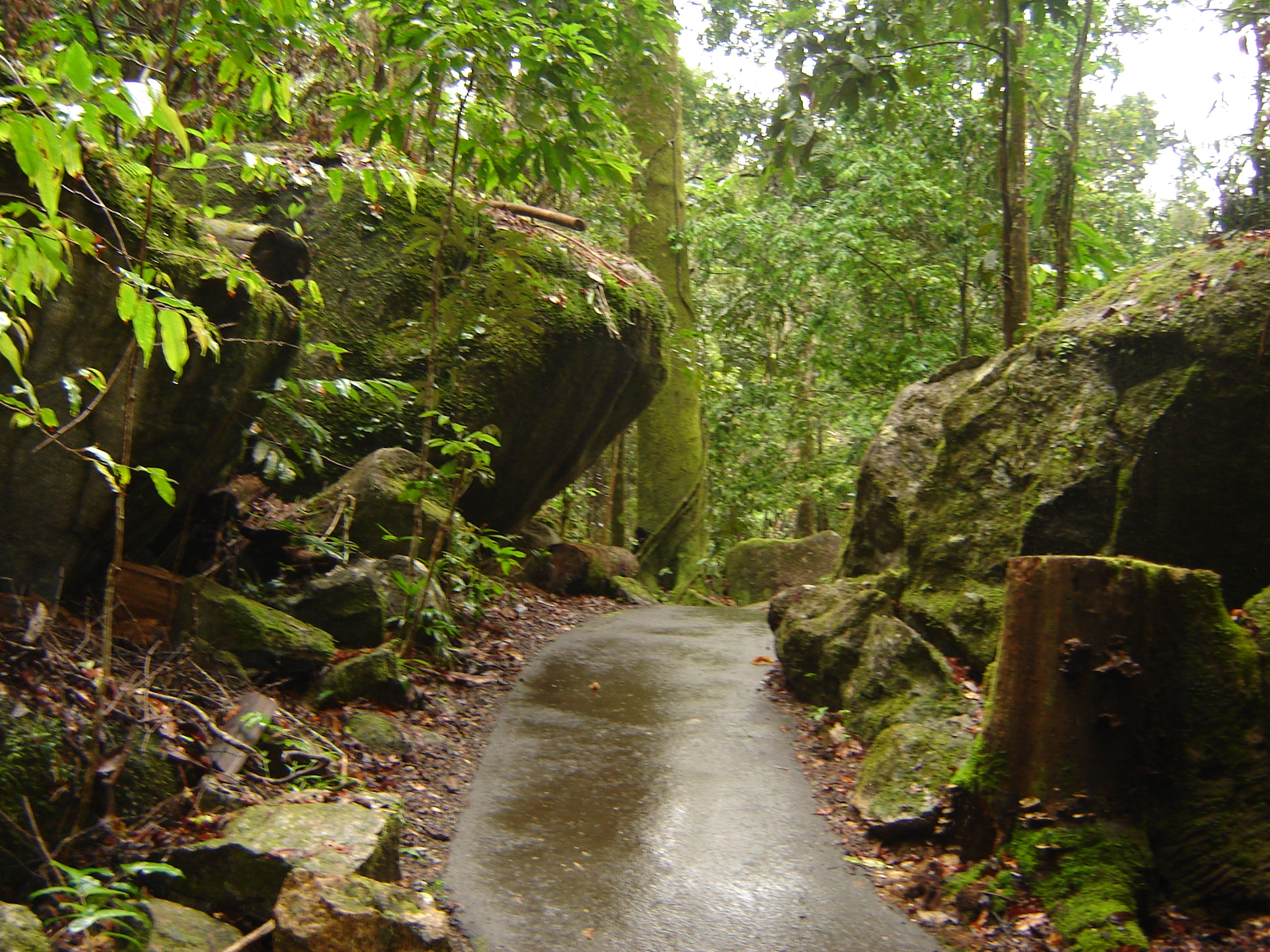
Typical scenery in the Wet Tropics, a walking path with fauna at Josephine Falls, located near Innisfail. Foliage is thin in the photograph due damage from Cyclone Larry.

These forests are limited to areas of high rainfall and good soils. In waterlogged soils, the rainforest flora gives way to Melaleuca thickets, and on poor soils and in drier areas Eucalyptus becomes dominant. The rainforest flora is intolerant of fire, and where periods of drought have allowed devastating fires, the rainforest flora has retreated, allowing fire-tolerant Eucalyptus to become established. If a relatively wet period persists, the rainforest flora may reestablish itself. It is thought that the land management practices of the aboriginal Australians, which involve setting regular fires to keep the eucalyptus woodlands open, may have encouraged the expansion of eucalyptus forests at the expense of the rainforest flora. These rainforests seem to have retreated considerably since the arrival of the aboriginals' ancestors 50,000 years ago, and are presently limited to isolated pockets comprising less than 2% of the continent's area.

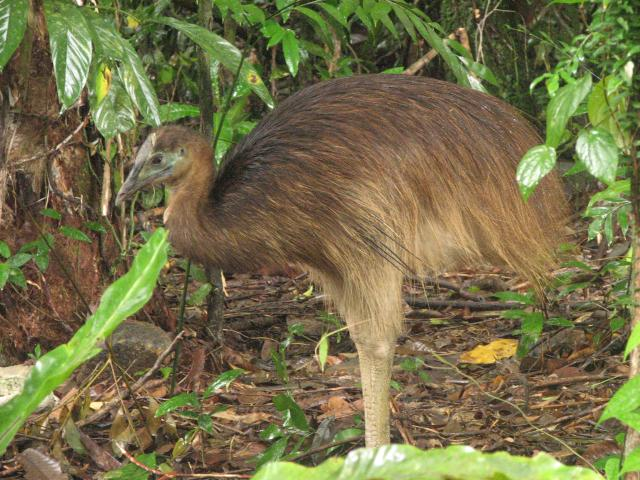
Young cassowary in the Daintree Rainforest

Animal biodiversity is high, also. 672 species of terrestrial vertebrates have been recorded in the ecoregion, 370 species of birds, 70 species of reptile, and 78 species of freshwater fish (of Australia's total of 180 fish species). 11% of the vertebrates are endemic to the region, and 22% of the reptiles. Most of the endemic species live about 400 metres in the rainforest.

== Conservation ==
These forests are particularly interesting because of their southern location and the high degree of endemism of their plant and animal species. Deforestation caused by logging, road building and farming has led to habitat fragmentation and diminishing populations of species such as spotted-tailed quoll (Dasyurus maculatus), cassowary (Casuarius casuarius), and ring-tail possum (Hemibelideus lemuroides). Introduced species also pose a serious threat to many native species.

In an effort to preserve the Daintree Rainforest north of the Daintree River it was decided by the Government of Queensland in 1993 to halt the spread of the electricity network north of that point, providing a limit to tourist development.

Protected areas include the following:

- Homevale National Park
- Eungella National Park
- Dryander National Park
- Conway National Park
- Whitsunday Islands National Park
- Paluma Range National Park
- Halifax Bay Wetlands National Park
- Hinchinbrook Island National Park
- Girramay National Park
- Girringun National Park
- Hull River National Park
- Kurrimine Beach National Park
- Eubenangee Swamp National Park
- Ella Bay National Park
- Wooroonooran National Park
- Barron Gorge National Park
- Daintree National Park
- Cedar Bay National Park
- Kalkajaka National Park

== Tourism ==
The forests, together with the Great Barrier Reef, have been identified and promoted as a major tourist attraction of Tropical North Queensland, one of five within the state. One of the most significant tourist attractions in the rain forests is the Skyrail Rainforest Cableway.

== See also ==
- Wet Tropics of Queensland
- Temperate Rainforests of New South Wales
