= Central Ranges xeric scrub =

Deserts and xeric shrublands ecoregion of Australia

Coordinates: 25°44′21.29″S 128°59′44.58″E

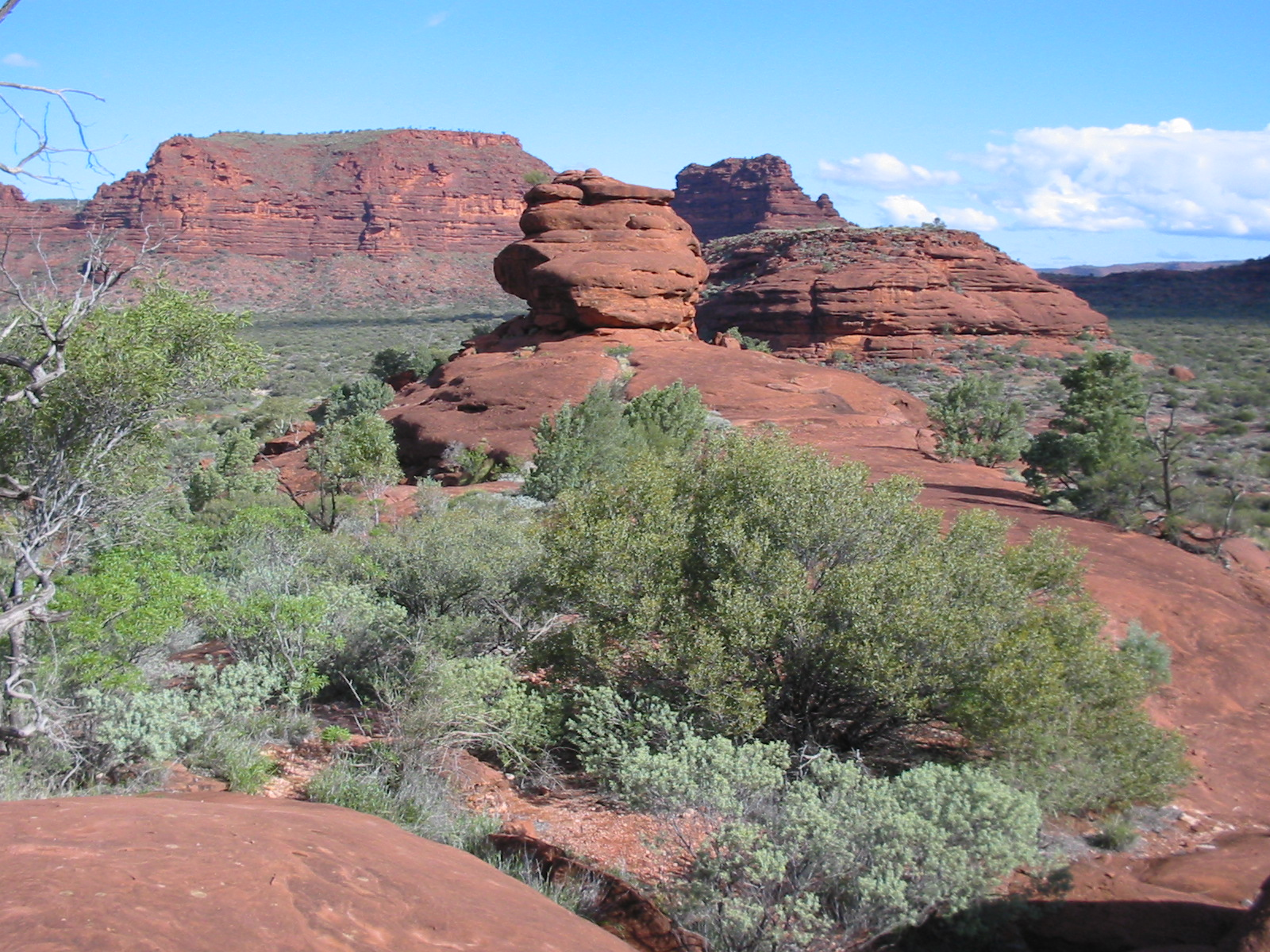
- Finke Gorge National Park

Ecology
- Realm: Australasian
- Biome: Deserts and xeric shrublands
- Borders: List: Gibson Desert; Great Sandy–Tanami desert; Great Victoria Desert; Simpson Desert; Tirari–Sturt stony desert

Geography
- Area: 287,406 km^{2} (110,968 sq mi)
- Country: Australia
- States: Northern Territory; South Australia, Western Australia

Conservation
- Conservation status: Vulnerable
- Protected: 71,805 km^{2} (25%)

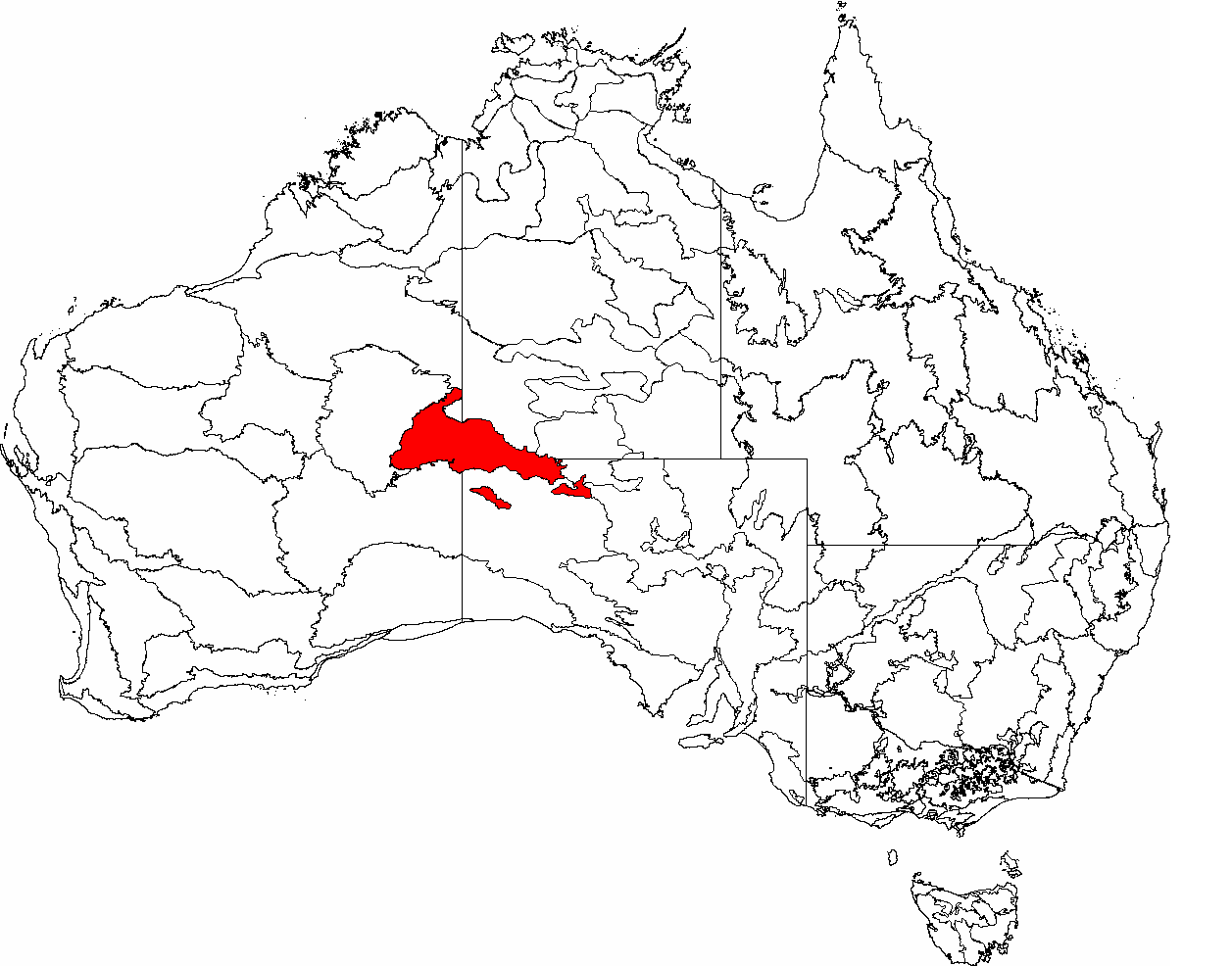
The IBRA regions, with Central Ranges in red

The Central Ranges xeric scrub is a deserts and xeric shrublands ecoregion of Australia.

== Location and description ==
The region consists of sandy plains with some areas of rocky highland. These plains have a dry climate but do get some rain in both summer and winter. This area contains the remote city of Alice Springs while the grasslands are home to a number of Indigenous Australian communities or are used for cattle grazing.

This ecoregion contains four Interim Biogeographic Regionalisation for Australia bioregions – Burt Plain, Central Ranges, Finke, and MacDonnell Ranges.

== Flora ==
This ecoregion includes the Central Australian Mountain Ranges Centres of Plant Diversity. The habitats consists of thick, tough spinifex grassland with some wooded areas of western myall and desert oak (Acacia coriacea). The region and the MacDonnell Ranges in particular are home to a number of specialised endemic plant species including the cabbage palms of Palm Valley in Finke Gorge National Park.

== Fauna ==
Birds include the red-tailed black cockatoo and the spinifexbird while animals include the black-flanked rock-wallaby population of the MacDonnell Ranges and the green tree frog.

== Conservation and threats ==
Overgrazing by cattle and introduced animals including horses, donkeys and rabbits are a threat to habitats.

== Protected areas ==
Protected areas include Finke Gorge National Park, Tjoritja / West MacDonnell National Park, and Watarrka National Park.
