= Central Ranges =

Bioregion of Australia

- Region
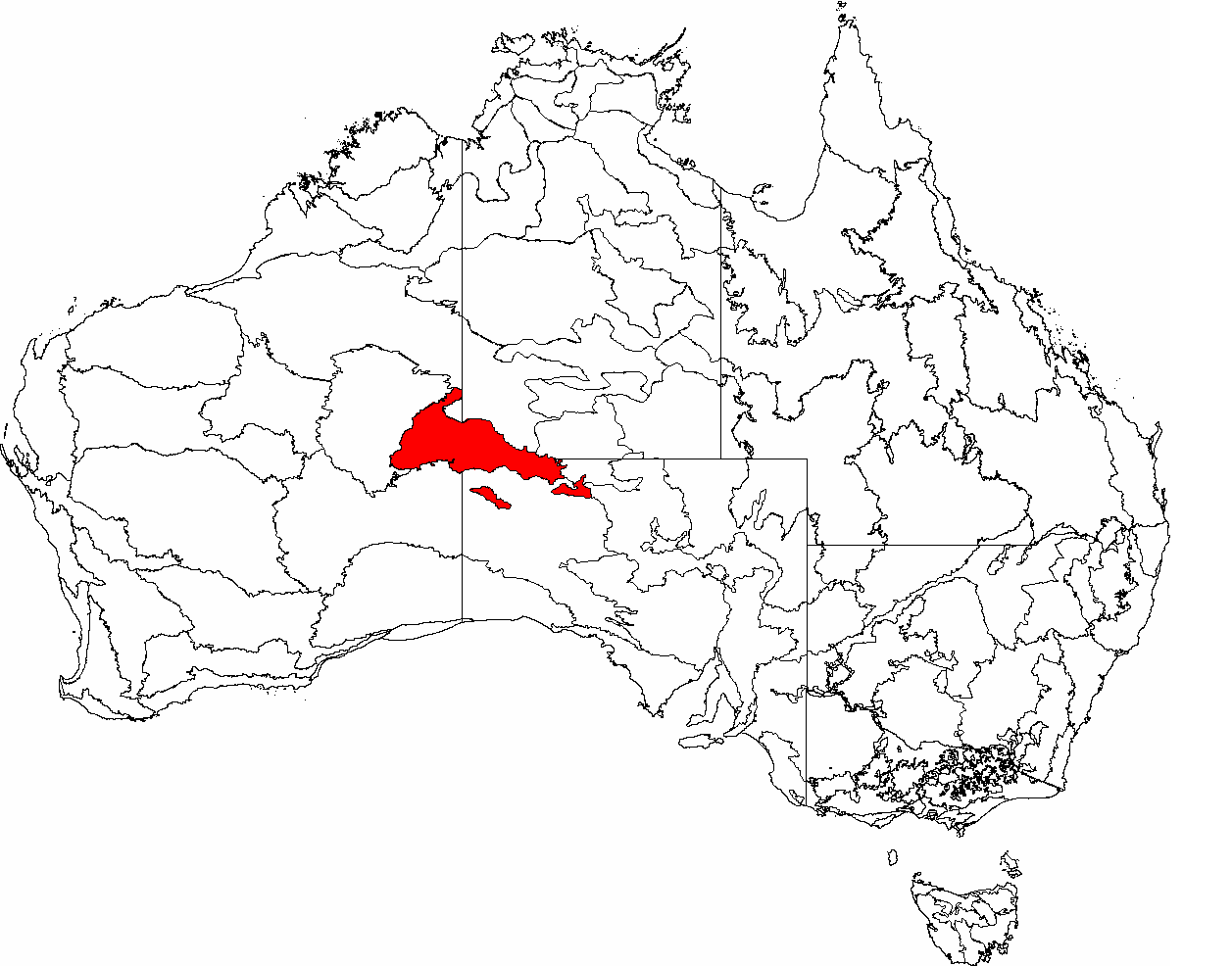
- The interim Australian bioregions, with Central Ranges in red
- Country: Australia
- State: Australia

Area
  - Total: 101,640.44 km^{2} (39,243.59 sq mi)
Localities around Central Ranges
Gibson Desert	Great Sandy Desert	Finke
Gibson Desert	Central Ranges	Finke
Great Victoria Desert	Great Victoria Desert	Great Victoria Desert

Central Ranges (code CER) is an Australian bioregion, with an area of 101,640.44 square kilometres (39,244 sq mi) spreading across two states and one territory: South Australia, Western Australia, and the Northern Territory. It forms a large part of the World Wide Fund for Nature Central Ranges xeric scrub ecoregion.
