= Carpentaria tropical savanna =

Ecoregion in Australia

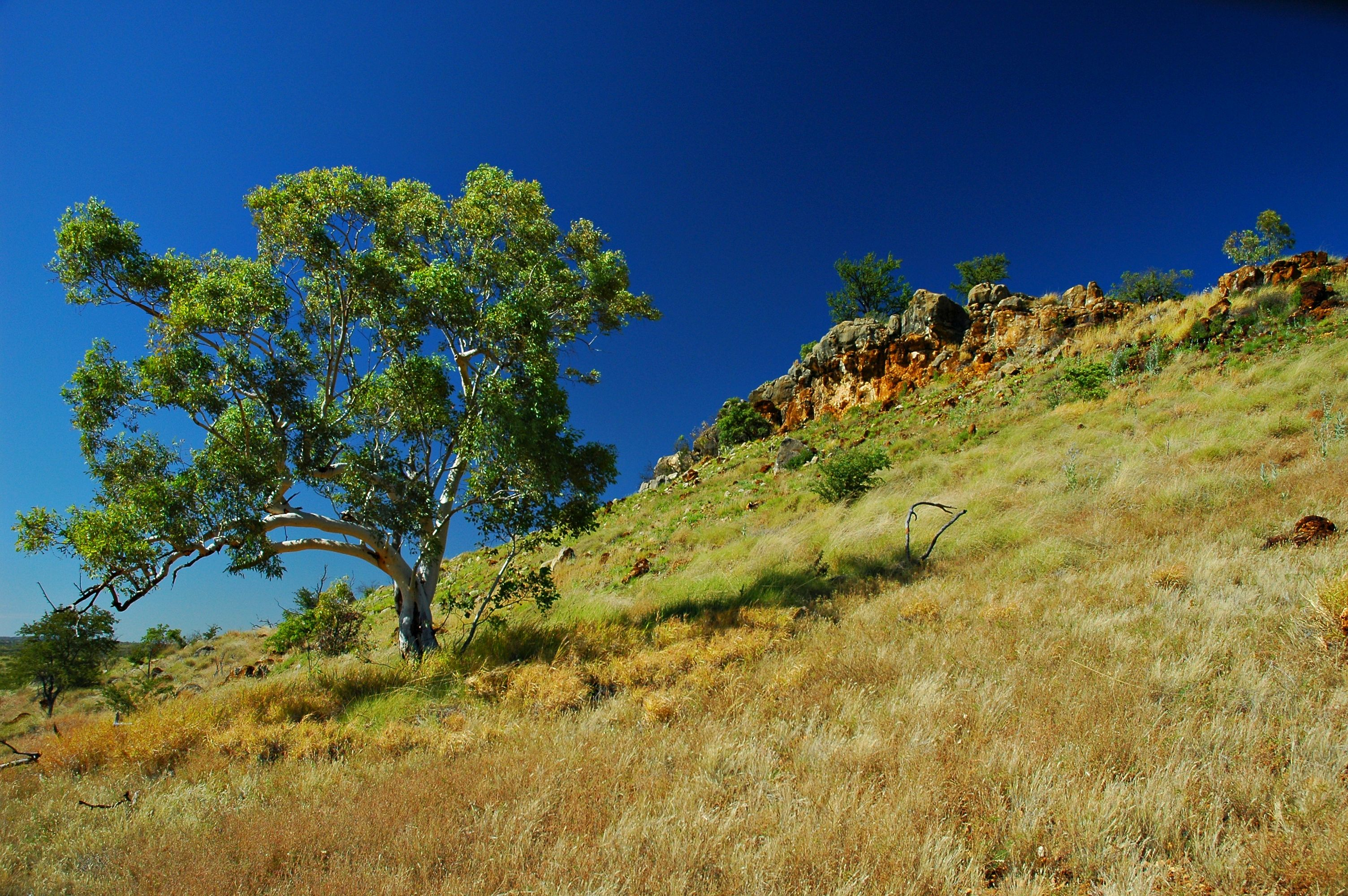
- Savanna at Riversleigh fossil site, near Lawn Hill, Queensland.

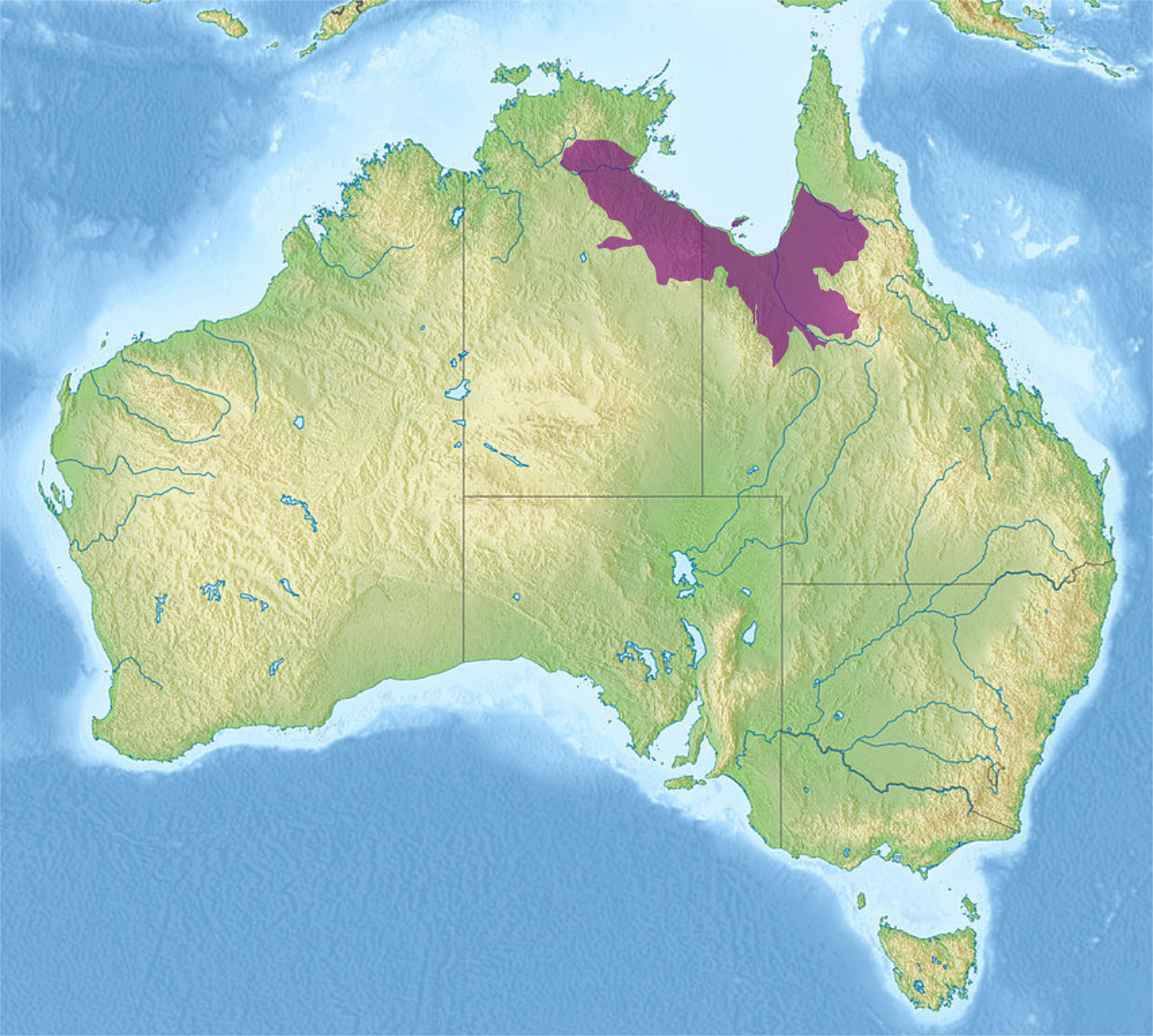
- Ecoregion territory (in purple)

Ecology
- Realm: Australasian
- Biome: tropical and subtropical grasslands, savannas, and shrublands
- Borders: List: Arnhem Land tropical savanna; Cape York Peninsula tropical savanna; Einasleigh Uplands savanna; Kimberley tropical savanna; Mitchell Grass Downs; Victoria Plains tropical savanna

Geography
- Area: 365,042 km^{2} (140,944 sq mi)
- Country: Australia
- States: Northern Territory; Queensland
- Coordinates: 17.5°S 138.95°E

Conservation
- Conservation status: Relatively stable/intact
- Protected: 24,914 km² (7%)

The Carpentaria tropical savanna is a tropical and subtropical grasslands, savannas, and shrublands ecoregion in northern Australia.

== Geography ==
The ecoregion lies in northwestern Queensland and northeastern Northern Territory, south of the Gulf of Carpentaria. It includes much of Queensland's Gulf Country, and a portion of the Barkly Tableland in the Northern Territory. The ecoregion includes the Wellesley Islands and Pellew Islands in the gulf.

The Roper, Limmen Bight, McArthur, Calvert, Nicholson, Leichhardt, Flinders, Norman, Gilbert, Staaten, and Mitchell rivers drain into the Gulf of Carpentaria. Most have freshwater and brackish wetlands in near the gulf.

It is bounded on the northeast by the Cape York Peninsula tropical savanna, on the east by the Einasleigh Uplands savanna, on the south by the Mitchell Grass Downs, on the west by the Victoria Plains tropical savanna and Kimberley tropical savanna, and on the northwest by the Arnhem Land tropical savanna.

=== IBRA regions ===
The ecoregion includes three IBRA regions – Gulf Coastal, Gulf Fall and Uplands, and Gulf Plains.

== Climate ==
The ecoregion has a tropical savanna climate. Rainfall is strongly seasonal. The monsoon winds bring rainfall during the Southern Hemisphere summer from November to March, followed by a dry season during the rest of the year. Average annual rainfall generally decreases from north to south. It is highest (1000 mm to 1200 mm) in the northwestern portion of the ecoregion in the Northern Territory, and over 900 mm in the northeastern part of the ecoregion east of the Gulf of Carpentaria. Rainfall is approximately 750 mm along the southern coast of the Gulf of Carpentaria, and decreases to less than 500 mm further south. Temperatures are generally warm year-round, with a wider range between maximum and minimum monthly temperatures as one moves further from the coast.

== Flora ==
The vegetation of the ecoregion includes grasslands, savanna, open woodlands, and small patches of forest.

The Gulf Coastal region, which encompasses the coastal plains along the western Gulf of Carpentaria in Northern Territory, is covered mostly in woodlands of Darwin stringybark (Eucalyptus tetrodonta) with an understory of grasses, chiefly curly spinifex (Triodia pungens).

The Gulf Fall and Uplands, which lies west and south of the gulf coastal plain, is mostly woodland and savanna of Darwin box (Eucalyptus tectifica) and long-fruited bloodwood (Corymbia polycarpa). Curly spinifex is the most common grass, with areas of tall Sorghum grasses, like those typical of Arnhem Land's savannas, in more humid areas of the uplands.

The Gulf Plains, which lie south and southeast of the Gulf, are mostly open grasslands of bluegrass (Dichanthium spp.). In the southwestern Gulf Plains, along the northern edge of the Mount Isa Inlier, there is a narrow belt of Eucalyptus and Melaleuca woodlands, with a grassy understory dominated by Chrysopogon fallax. In the southeastern Gulf Plains close to the Einasleigh Uplands, there are Eucalyptus woodlands, and low woodlands of Melaleuca with the grasses Aristida spp. and Chrysopogon fallax. On the higher plateau remnants in the southeast, there are woodlands of narrow-leaved ironbark (Eucalyptus crebra) and bloodwood (Corymbia spp.), interspersed with stands of lancewood (Acacia shirleyi).

The ecoregion's rivers form freshwater and saltwater wetlands as they approach the gulf. There are extensive mangroves along the coast.

== Fauna ==
The Carpentarian rock rat (Zyzomys palatalis) is endemic to the ecoregion, and found only in patches of ravine forest and vine thickets on sandstone outcrops in Wollogorang Station. The station is located close to the gulf in the Northern Territory near the border with Queensland.

== Protected areas ==
A 2017 assessment found that 24,914 km², or 7%, of the ecoregion is in protected areas. Protected areas in the ecoregion include Limmen National Park, Rutland Plains Nature Refuge, Staaten River National Park, Thuwathu-Bujimulla Indigenous Protected Area, Nijinda Durlga Indigenous Protected Area, Pungalina-Seven Emu Sanctuary, Wongalara Sanctuary, the southern portion of South-East Arnhem Land Indigenous Protected Area, and the northern portion of Boodjamulla National Park.
