= Mitchell Grass Downs =

Ecoregion in Australia

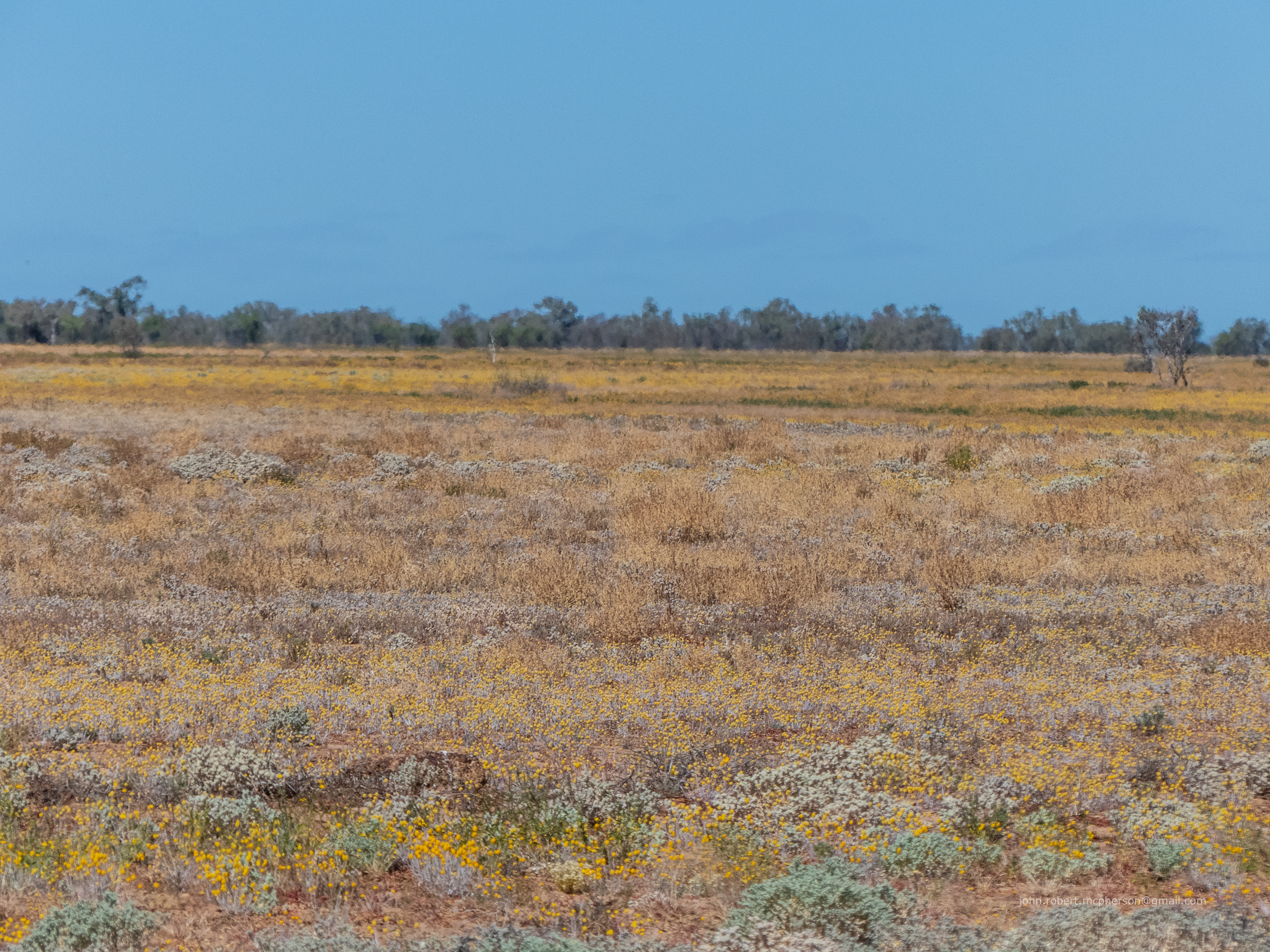
- Mitchell Grass Downs in Boulia, Queensland

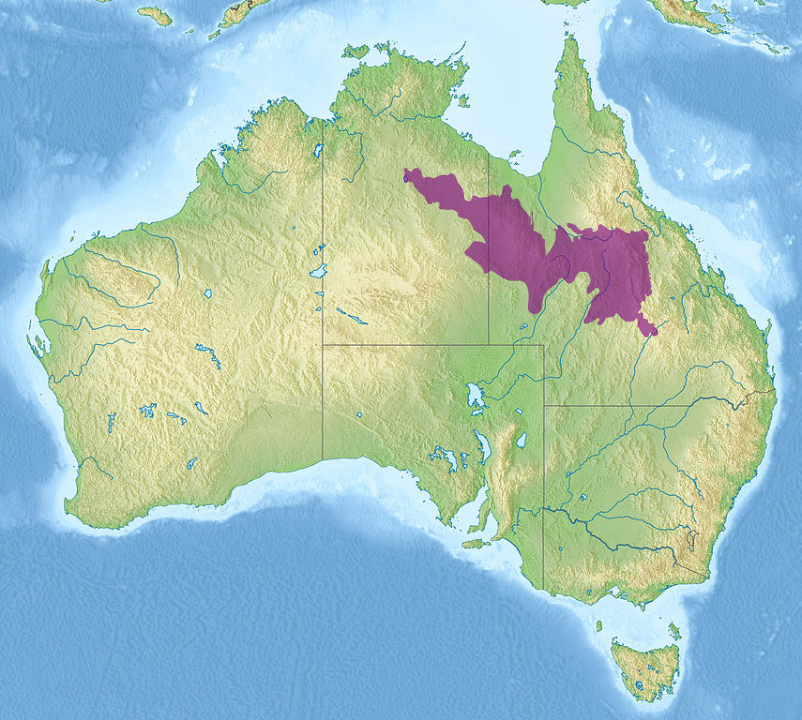
- Ecoregion territory (in purple)

Ecology
- Realm: Australasian
- Biome: tropical and subtropical grasslands, savannas, and shrublands
- Borders: List: Brigalow tropical savanna; Carpentaria tropical savanna; Eastern Australia mulga shrublands; Einasleigh Uplands savanna; Great Sandy-Tirari desert; Simpson Desert; Victoria Plains tropical savanna

Geography
- Area: 471,881 km^{2} (182,194 mi^{2})
- Country: Australia
- States: Northern Territory; Queensland
- Coordinates: 22.4°S 141.6°E

Conservation
- Conservation status: Vulnerable
- Protected: 11,486 km^{2} (2%)

The Mitchell Grass Downs is a tropical and subtropical grasslands, savannas, and shrublands ecoregion in northeastern Australia. It is a mostly treeless grassland, characterised by Mitchell grasses (Astrebla spp.).

== Location and description ==
The ecoregion is bounded on the north and east by tropical savanna ecoregions – the Victoria Plains tropical savanna to the northeast, the Carpentaria tropical savanna to the north, the Einasleigh Uplands savanna to the northeast, and the Brigalow tropical savanna to the east. More arid ecoregions lie to west and south – the Great Sandy–Tanami desert to the southwest, the Simpson Desert to the south, and the Eastern Australia mulga shrublands to the southeast.

The ecoregion includes three IBRA regions – Mitchell Grass Downs, Mount Isa Inlier, and Desert Uplands.

== Climate ==
The climate is tropical and semi-arid. Average annual rainfall varies across the ecoregion, from 350 mm to 750 mm. In much of the ecoregion rainfall is seasonal, coinciding with the summer monsoon. Rainfall becomes less seasonal towards the southeast.

== Flora ==
The vegetation consists mostly of grasses along with wildflowers and low shrubs, including Queensland bluebush (Chenopodium auricomum). There are scattered dry acacia woodlands, predominantly of gidgee (Acacia cambagei). Watercourses support woodlands of red river gum (Eucalyptus camuldulensis), coolibah (E. coolabah), and paperbark (Melaleuca spp.).

The Desert Uplands has dry woodlands of Eucalyptus populnea, E. melanophloia, and E. similis. Low open woodlands of snappy gum (Eucalyptus leucophloia), Cloncurry box (E. leucophylla), and silver box (E. pruinosa) grow in the Mount Isa Inlier.
