= Victoria Plains tropical savanna =

Ecoregion in Australia

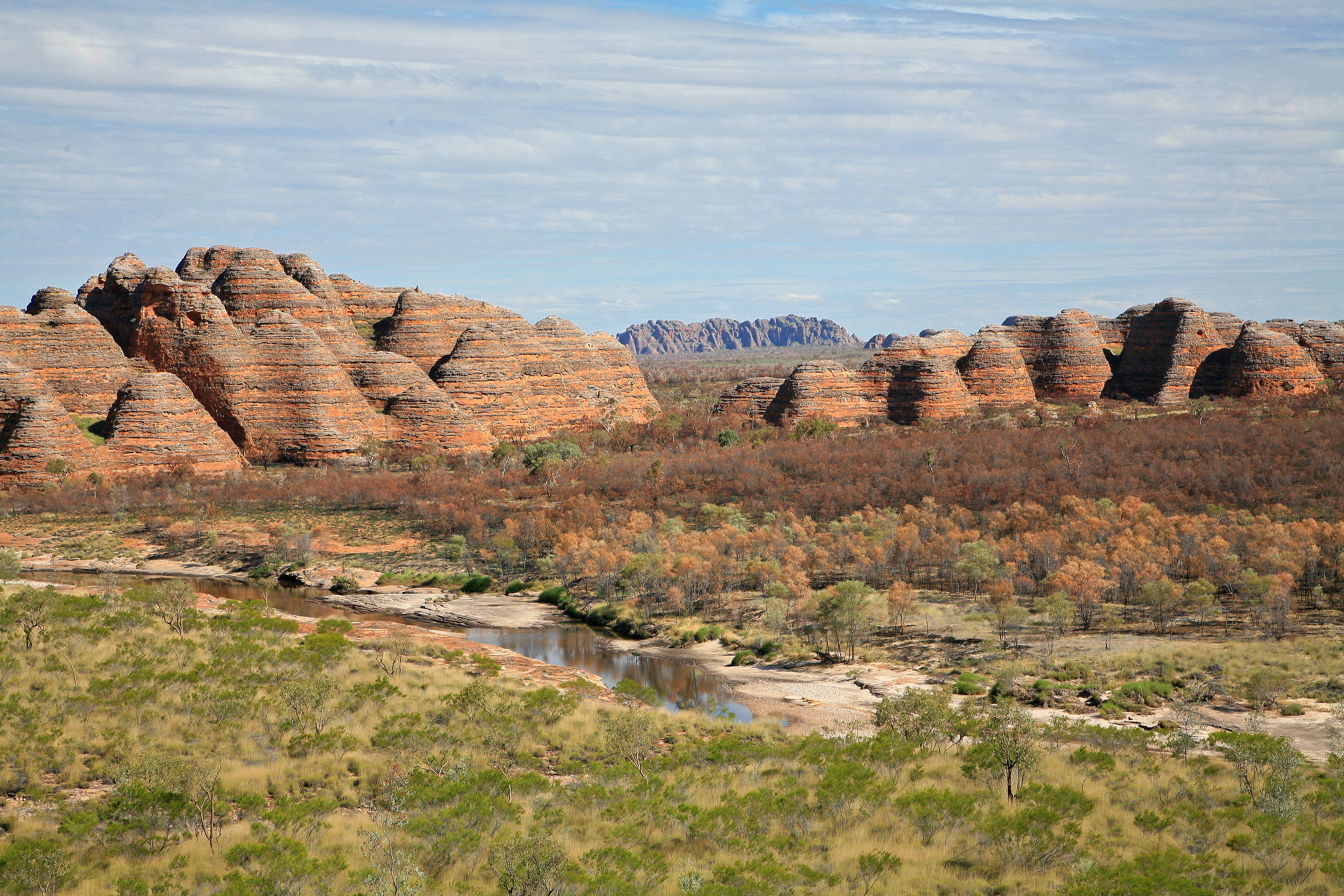
- Purnululu National Park, Western Australia

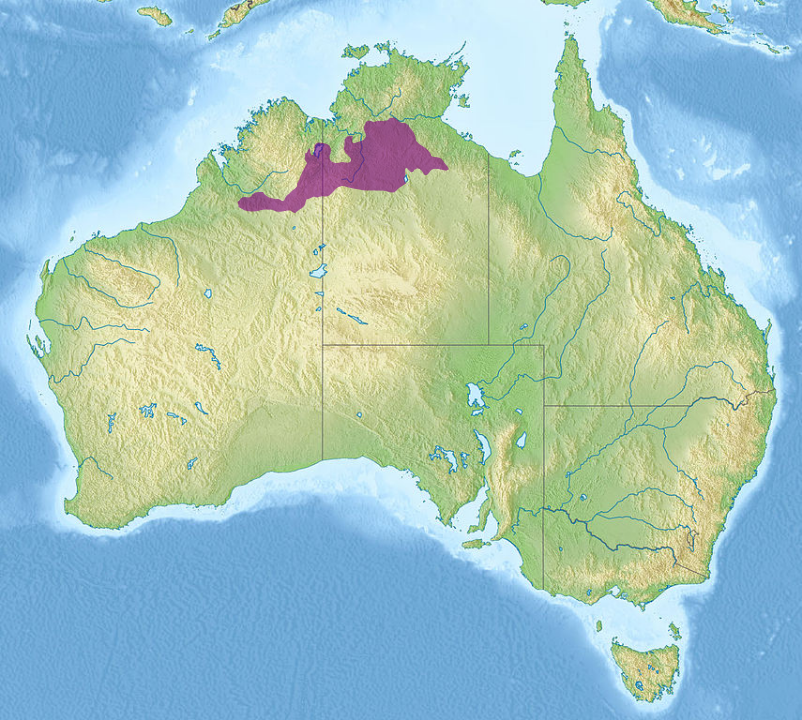
- Ecoregion territory (in purple)

Ecology
- Realm: Australasian
- Biome: tropical and subtropical grasslands, savannas, and shrublands
- Borders: Carpentaria tropical savanna; Great Sandy-Tanami desert; Kimberley tropical savanna, Mitchell Grass Downs

Geography
- Area: 223,982 km^{2} (86,480 mi^{2})
- Country: Australia
- States: Northern Territory; Western Australia
- Coordinates: 16.67°S 131.8°E

Conservation
- Conservation status: Vulnerable
- Protected: 16,001 km^{2} (7%)

The Victoria Plains tropical savanna is a tropical and subtropical grasslands, savannas, and shrublands ecoregion in northwestern Australia.

== Geography ==
The ecoregion lies in the central Northern Territory, extending into northeastern Western Australia. It forms a transition between the tropical savannas of northern Australia and the Australia's interior deserts. The Bungle Bungle Range is in the ecoregion. It is bounded on the northwest and north by the Kimberley tropical savanna, on the northeast and east by the Carpentaria tropical savanna, and on the southeast by the Mitchell Grass Downs. The Great Sandy-Tanami desert ecoregion lies to the south.

The western portion of the ecoregion, known as the Ord Victoria Plain, is drained by the upper Ord and Victoria rivers.

=== IBRA regions ===
The ecoregion encompasses the Ord Victoria Plain and Sturt Plateau IBRA regions.

== Climate ==
The ecoregion has a tropical savanna climate. Monthly average maximum temperatures range from 25 to 35 °C (77 to 95 °F). The monsoon brings a summer wet season between November and March. The dry season extends for the rest of the year, and is nearly rainless. Rainfall generally decreases from north to south, ranging from 1200 mm per year in the north to 600 mm per year in the south. Some localized areas in the mountains experience higher rainfall.

== Flora ==
Woodlands with a grassy understorey, savanna, and grasslands are the predominant vegetation types. Pockets of dense lancewood-bullwaddy woodland with a sparse understorey are found in the eastern portion of the ecoregion. Plant communities vary with soils and rainfall.

Woodlands of eucalypts (Eucalyptus spp.) and bloodwoods (Corymbia spp.) are the most extensive plant community, usually found on sandy or loamy soils. The trees form a canopy 5 to 15 metres high. There is an understorey of tall grasses, including species of Sorghum, Heteropogon, Themeda, Chrysopogon, Aristida, and Eriachne.

Open woodlands of Terminalia and Bauhinia species are found on fine-textured clay or clay-loam soils, as are grasslands with species of Astrebla, Iseilema, Chrysopogon, Aristida, and Dichanthium.

Open woodland of eucalypts with an understorey of hummock grasses (Triodia spp.) is found on sandstone outcrops and sandsheets derived from sandstones. Another sandstone plant community is heathland dominated by species of Grevillea and Acacia.

Lancewood-bullwaddy woodland is a distinct plant community limited mostly to the ecoregion. These woodlands and thickets are mostly found on lateritic soils in the eastern Sturt Plateau, with a few scattered areas on lateritic outcrops further west. It is dominated by the trees lancewood (Acacia shirleyi) and bullwaddy (Macropteranthes kekwickii). Bullwaddy is a dry-season deciduous tree that grows up to six metres high, with small leaves growing on short branchlets. Lancewood-bullwaddy woodland is found only in the Northern Territory, concentrated mostly in the ecoregion and extending into adjacent ones. The woodlands have a dense tree canopy and can form impenetrable thickets, with many climbing vines and a sparser understorey of forbs, small shrubs, ferns, and mosses. The woodlands are more fire-sensitive, and less fire-prone, than the adjacent eucalyptus woodlands. These woodlands and thickets, like the monsoon forests of the adjacent Kimberley and Arnhem Land ecoregions, are refuges for many of the fire-sensitive species characteristic of Australia's rainforest flora.

Riparian forests grow in strips along rivers and streams, and include river red gum (Eucalyptus camaldulensis), Terminalia platyphylla, Nauclea orientalis, and species of Ficus, Melaleuca, and Pandanus.

== Fauna ==
Native mammals include the spectacled hare-wallaby (Lagorchestes conspicillatus), which is especially common in the lancewood-bullwaddy thickets, and the northern nailtail wallaby (Onychogalea unguifera) in grasslands and eucalypt woodlands. Other native mammals include the agile wallaby (Macropus agilis), common wallaroo (Osphranter robustus), antilopine kangaroo (Osphranter antilopinus), short-beaked echidna (Tachyglossus aculeatus), common brushtail possum (Trichosurus vulpecula), rock-haunting ringtail possum (Petropseudes dahli), and sugar glider (Petaurus breviceps).

Three ground-foraging birds – the apostlebird (Struthidea cinerea), hooded robin (Melanodryas cucullata picata), and grey-crowned babbler (Pomatostomus temporalis rubeculus) – are associated with lancewood-bullwaddy woodlands and thickets. These bird species forage for invertebrates found in leaf litter and bare ground, which occur mostly in the lancewood-bullwaddy understorey and are seldom found elsewhere where tall grasses dominate the understorey.

The black-tailed goanna (Varanus tristis) and giant frog (Ranoidea australis) are native to the ecoregion.

== Conservation and threats ==
Starting in the 1880s, large numbers of cattle were allowed to graze freely in the ecoregion, sustained by the ecoregion's lush grasslands and surface water supplies. By the 1930s intensive grazing by cattle and feral donkeys, together with increased late-dry-season bushfires, had degraded and large areas of the ecoregion's woodlands and grasslands, creating extensive barren areas and soil erosion. The Ord River Regeneration Reserve (ORRR) was established in 1960 to reduce soil erosion into the planned Lake Argyle. The project included contour cultivation and reseeding degraded and barren areas along the Ord River above the dam site. Native species replanted included buffelgrass, birdwood grass, and kapok bush. Cattle numbers were reduced and cattle grazing areas were contained with fences in the Ord River catchment, and the feral donkeys were culled.

In 1987, The relatively intact area around the Bungle Bungle Range was gazetted as Purnulu National Park.

== Protected areas ==
A 2017 assessment found that 16,001 km^{2}, or 7%, of the ecoregion is in protected areas. Protected areas in the ecoregion include Purnululu National Park, Bullwaddy Conservation Reserve, Ord River Regeneration Reserve, and the eastern and southern portions of Judbarra National Park.
