= Great Sandy Island (Western Australia) =

Island in Western Australia

Coordinates: 21.195°S 115.639°E

Location of Great Sandy Island (Western Australia)

Great Sandy Island is an island between Onslow and Dampier, off the Pilbara coast of Western Australia. It has an area of about 32 hectares (79 acres). Great Sandy Island is located in the Great Sandy Island Nature Reserve, which was declared in 1968.
