= Geography of Tasmania =

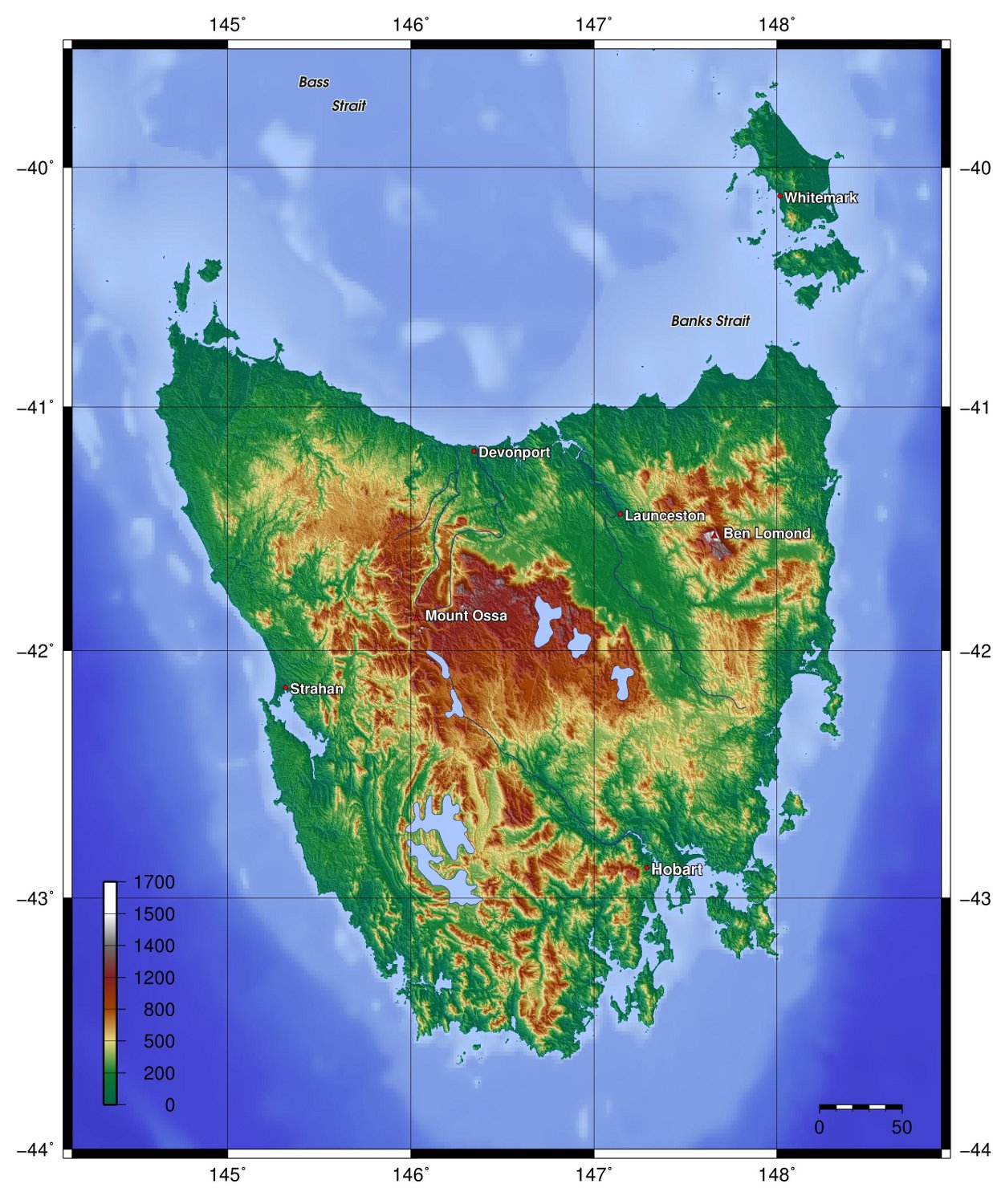
Topography of Tasmania

Tasmania, the largest island of Australia, has a landmass of 68,401 km^{2} (26,410 sq mi) and is located directly in the pathway of the notorious "Roaring Forties" wind that encircles the globe. To its north, it is separated from mainland Australia by Bass Strait. Tasmania is the only Australian state that is not located on the Australian mainland. About 2,500 kilometres (1,300 nautical miles) south of Tasmania island lies the George V Coast of Antarctica. Depending on which borders of the oceans are used, the island can be said to be either surrounded by the Southern Ocean, or to have the Pacific on its east and the Indian to its west. Still other definitions of the ocean boundaries would have Tasmania with the Great Australian Bight to the west, and the Tasman Sea to the east. The southernmost point on mainland Tasmania is approximately 43°38′37″S 146°49′38″E at South East Cape, and the northernmost point on mainland Tasmania is approximately 40°38′26″S 144°43′33″E in Woolnorth / Temdudheker near Cape Grim / Kennaook. Tasmania lies at similar latitudes to Te Waipounamu / South Island of New Zealand, and parts of Patagonia in South America, and relative to the Northern Hemisphere, it lies at similar latitudes to Hokkaido in Japan, Northeast China (Manchuria), the north Mediterranean in Europe, and the Canada-United States border.

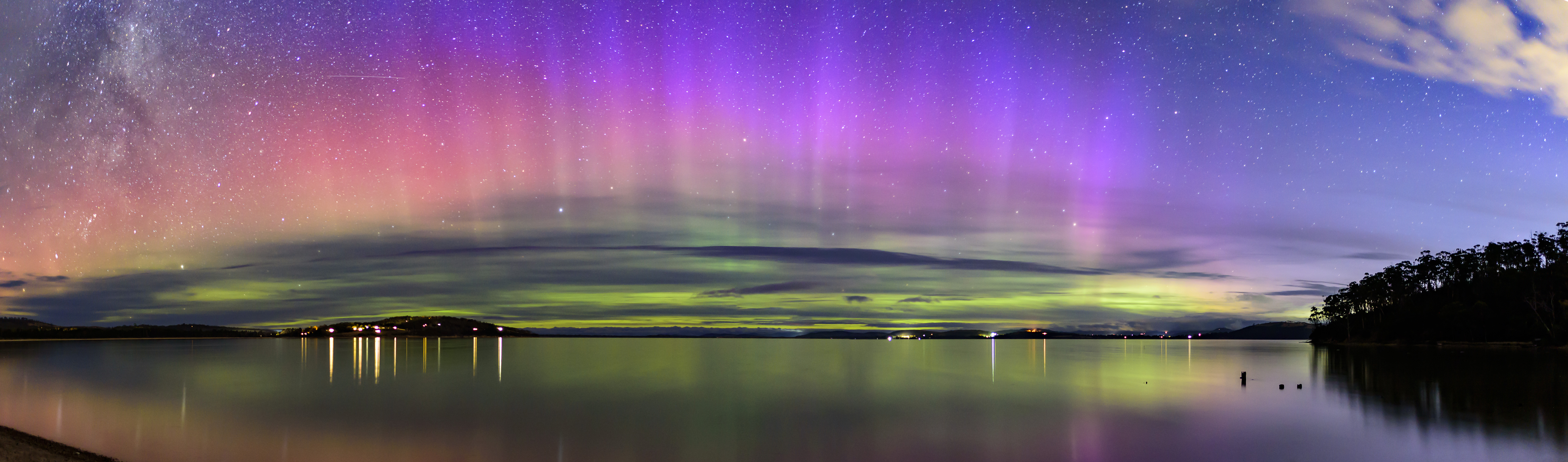
Because of Tasmania's proximity to the south magnetic pole towards Antarctica, the Aurora australis can sometimes be seen.

The most mountainous region is the Central Highlands area, which covers most of the central western parts of the state. The Midlands located in the central east, is fairly flat, and is predominantly used for agriculture, although farming activity is scattered throughout the state. Tasmania's tallest mountain is Mount Ossa at 1,617 m (5,305 ft). Much of Tasmania is still densely forested, with the Southwest National Park and neighbouring areas holding some of the last temperate rain forests in the Southern Hemisphere. The Tarkine, containing Savage River National Park located in the island's far north west, is the largest temperate rainforest area in Australia covering about 3,800 square kilometres (1,500 sq mi). With its rugged topography, Tasmania has a great number of rivers. Several of Tasmania's largest rivers have been dammed at some point to provide hydroelectricity. Many rivers begin in the Central Highlands and flow out to the coast. Tasmania's major population centres are mainly situated around estuaries (some of which are named rivers).

Tasmania is in the shape of a downward-facing triangle, likened to a shield, heart, or face. It consists of the main island as well as at least a thousand neighbouring islands within the state's jurisdiction. The largest of these are Flinders Island in the Furneaux Group of Bass Strait, King Island in the west of Bass Strait, Cape Barren Island south of Flinders Island, Bruny Island separated from Tasmania by the D'Entrecasteaux Channel, Macquarie Island 1,500 km from Tasmania, and Maria Island off the east coast. Tasmania features a number of separated and continuous mountain ranges. The majority of the state is defined by a significant dolerite exposure, though the western half of the state is older and more rugged, featuring buttongrass plains, temperate rainforests, and quartzite ranges, notably Federation Peak and Frenchmans Cap. The presence of these mountain ranges is a primary factor in the rain shadow effect, where the western half receives the majority of rainfall, which also influences the types of vegetation that can grow. The Central Highlands feature a large plateau which forms a number of ranges and escarpments on its north side, tapering off along the south, and radiating into the highest mountain ranges in the west. At the north-west of this, another plateau radiates into a system of hills where takayna / Tarkine is located.

The Interim Biogeographic Regionalisation for Australia divides Tasmania into 9 bioregions: Ben Lomond, Furneaux, King, Central Highlands, Northern Midlands, Northern Slopes, Southern Ranges, South East, and West.

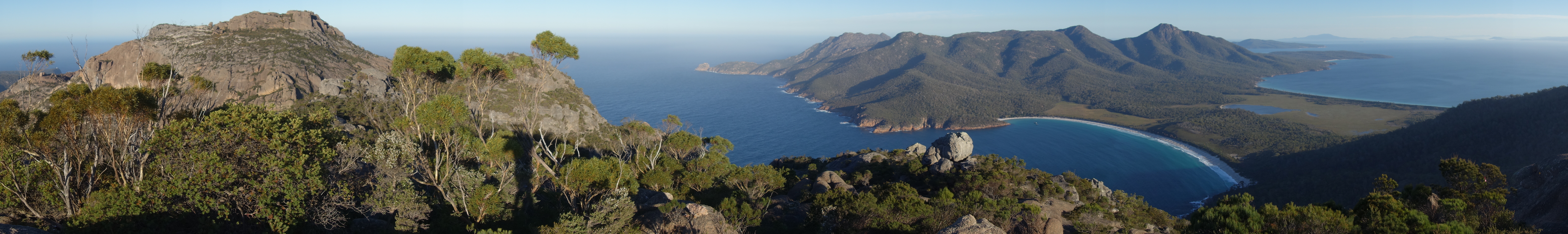
Wineglass Bay seen from Mount Amos at Freycinet National Park

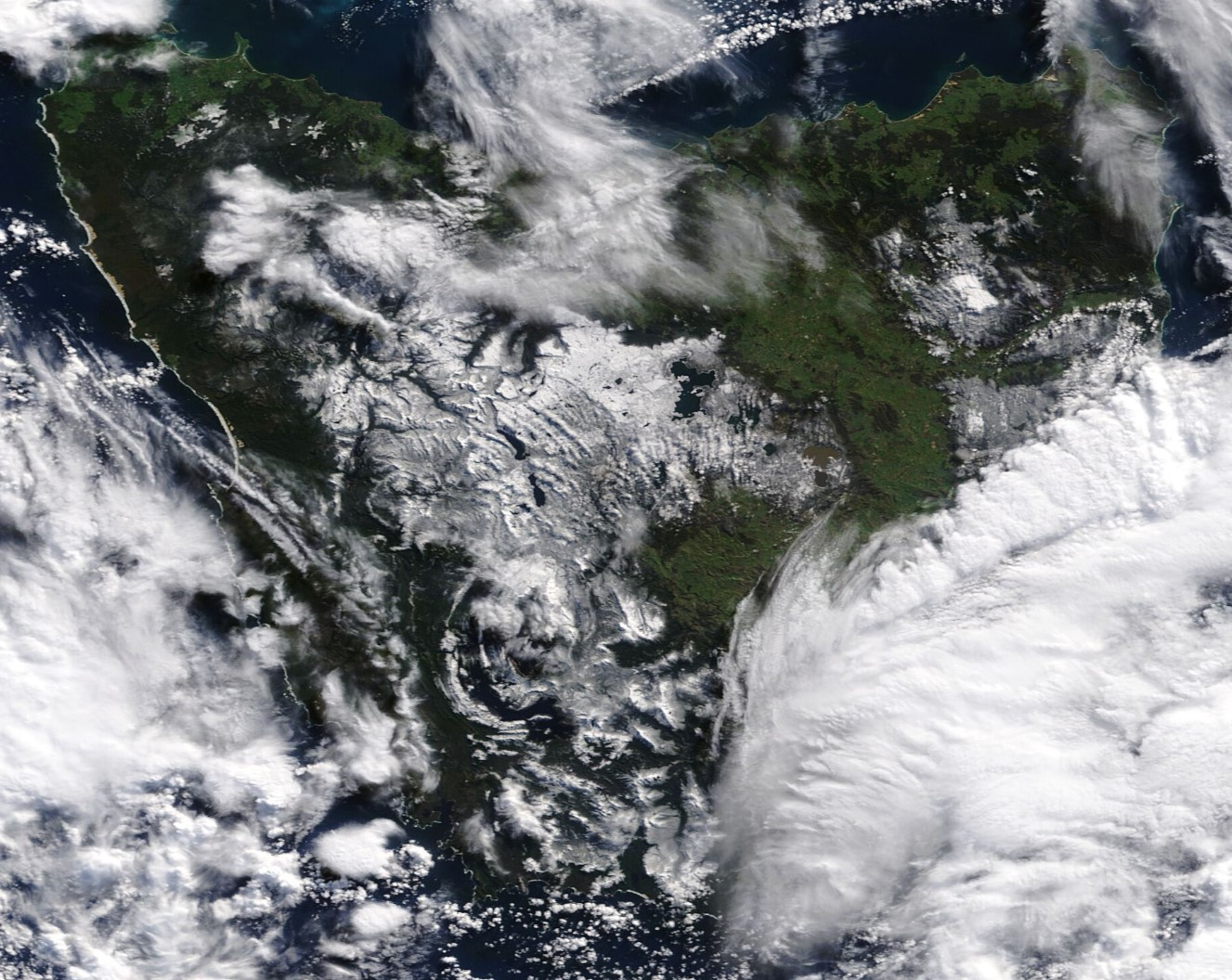
Satellite image showing snow covering Tasmania's highlands, August 2020

== Environment ==
Tasmania's environment consists of many different biomes or communities across its different regions. It is the most forested state in Australia, and preserves the country's largest areas of temperate rainforest. A distinctive type of moorland found across the west, and particularly south-west of Tasmania, are buttongrass plains, which are speculated to have been expanded by Tasmanian Aboriginal burning practices. Tasmania also features a diverse alpine garden environment, such as cushion plant. Highland areas receive consistent snowfall above ~1,000 metres every year, and due to cold air from Antarctica, this level often reaches 800 m, and more occasionally 600 or 400 metres. Every five or so years, snow can form at sea level. This environment gives rise to the cypress forests of the Central Plateau and mountainous highlands. In particular, the Walls of Jerusalem with large areas of rare pencil pine, and its closest relative King Billy pine. On the West Coast Range and partially on Mount Field, Australia's only winter-deciduous plant, deciduous beech is found, which forms a carpet or krummholz, or very rarely a 4-metre tree.

Tasmania features a high concentration of waterfalls. These can be found in small creeks, alpine streams, rapid rivers, or off precipitous plunges. Some of the tallest waterfalls are found on mountain massifs, sometimes at a 200-metre cascade. The most famous and most visited waterfall in Tasmania is Russell Falls in Mount Field due to its proximity to Hobart and stepped falls at a total height of 58 metres. Tasmania also has a large number of beaches, the longest of which is Ocean Beach on the West Coast at about 40 kilometres. Wineglass Bay in Freycinet on the east coast is a well-known landmark of the state.

The Tasmanian temperate rainforests cover a few different types. These are also considered distinct from the more common wet sclerophyll forests, though these eucalypt forests often form with rainforest understorey and ferns (such as tree-ferns) are usually never absent. Rainforest found in deep gullies are usually difficult to traverse due to dense understorey growth, such as from horizontal (Anodopetalum biglandulosum). Higher-elevation forests (~500 to 800 m) have smaller ground vegetation and are thus easier to walk in. The most common rainforests usually have a 50-metre canopy and are varied by environmental factors. Emergent growth usually comes from eucalyptus, which can tower another 50 metres higher (usually less), providing the most common choice of nesting for giant wedge-tailed eagles.

The human environment ranges from urban or industrial development, to farming or grazing land. The most cultivated area is the Midlands, where it has suitable soil but is also the driest part of the state.

=== Insularity ===
Tasmania's insularity was possibly detected by Captain Abel Tasman when he charted Tasmania's coast in 1642. On 5 December, Tasman was following the east coast northward to see how far it went. When the land veered to the north-west at Eddystone Point, he tried to keep in with it but his ships were suddenly hit by the Roaring Forties howling through Bass Strait. Tasman was on a mission to find the Southern Continent, not more islands, so he abruptly turned away to the east and continued his continent-hunting.

The next European to enter the strait was Captain James Cook on HMS Endeavour in April 1770. However, after sailing for two hours westward into the strait against the wind, he turned back east and noted in his journal that he was "doubtful whether they [i.e. Van Diemen's Land and New Holland] are one land or no".

The strait was named after George Bass, after he and Matthew Flinders passed through it while circumnavigating Van Diemen's Land in the Norfolk in 1798–99. At Flinders' recommendation, the Governor of New South Wales, John Hunter, in 1800 named the stretch of water between the mainland and Van Diemen's Land "Bass's Straits". Later it became known as Bass Strait.

The existence of the strait had been suggested in 1797 by the master of Sydney Cove when he reached Sydney after deliberately grounding his foundering ship and being stranded on Preservation Island (at the eastern end of the strait). He reported that the strong south westerly swell and the tides and currents suggested that the island was in a channel linking the Pacific and southern Indian Ocean. Governor Hunter thus wrote to Joseph Banks in August 1797 that it seemed certain a strait existed.

== Climate ==
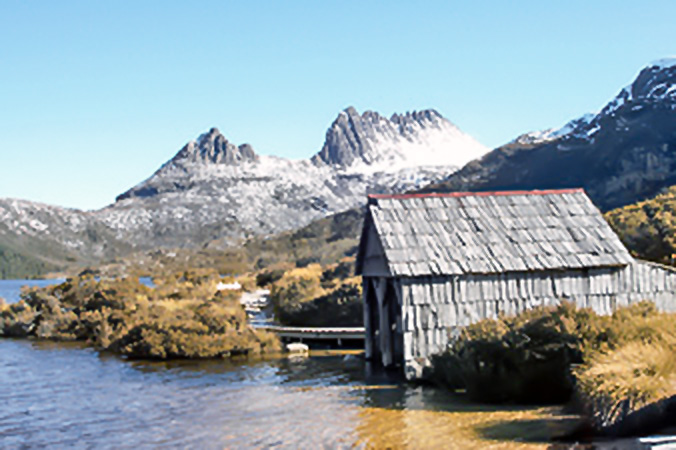
Snow on Cradle Mountain

The Köppen climate classifications of Tasmania

Tasmania has a relatively cool temperate climate compared to the rest of Australia, spared from the hot summers of the mainland and experiencing four distinct seasons. Summer is from December to February when the average maximum sea temperature is 21 °C (70 °F) and inland areas around Launceston reach 24 °C (75 °F). Other inland areas are much cooler, with Liawenee, located on the Central Plateau, one of the coldest places in Australia, ranging between 4 °C (39 °F) and 17 °C (63 °F) in February. Autumn is from March to May, with mostly settled weather, as summer patterns gradually take on the shape of winter patterns. The winter months are from June to August, and are generally the wettest and coldest months in the state, with most high lying areas receiving considerable snowfall. Winter maximums are 12 °C (54 °F) on average along coastal areas and 3 °C (37 °F) on the central plateau, as a result of a series of cold fronts from the Southern Ocean. Inland areas receive regular freezes throughout the winter months. Spring is from September to November, and is an unsettled season of transition, where winter weather patterns begin to take the shape of summer patterns, although snowfall is still common up until October. Spring is generally the windiest time of the year with afternoon sea breezes starting to take effect on the coast.

=== Climate data ===
| City/town | Mean min. temp °C | Mean max. temp °C | No. clear days | Rainfall (mm) |
|---|---|---|---|---|
| Hobart | 8.3 | 16.9 | 41 | 616 |
| Launceston | 7.0 | 18.3 | 50 | 666 |
| Devonport | 8.0 | 16.8 | 61 | 778 |
| Strahan | 7.9 | 16.5 | 41 | 1,458 |

Climate data for Hobart (Battery Point)
| Month | Jan | Feb | Mar | Apr | May | Jun | Jul | Aug | Sep | Oct | Nov | Dec | Year |
|---|---|---|---|---|---|---|---|---|---|---|---|---|---|
| Record high °C (°F) | 41.8 (107.2) | 40.1 (104.2) | 39.1 (102.4) | 31.0 (87.8) | 25.7 (78.3) | 20.6 (69.1) | 22.1 (71.8) | 24.5 (76.1) | 31.0 (87.8) | 34.6 (94.3) | 36.8 (98.2) | 40.6 (105.1) | 41.8 (107.2) |
| Mean daily maximum °C (°F) | 22.7 (72.9) | 22.2 (72.0) | 20.7 (69.3) | 17.9 (64.2) | 15.3 (59.5) | 12.7 (54.9) | 12.6 (54.7) | 13.7 (56.7) | 15.7 (60.3) | 17.6 (63.7) | 19.1 (66.4) | 21.0 (69.8) | 17.6 (63.7) |
| Mean daily minimum °C (°F) | 13.0 (55.4) | 12.8 (55.0) | 11.6 (52.9) | 9.4 (48.9) | 7.6 (45.7) | 5.5 (41.9) | 5.2 (41.4) | 5.6 (42.1) | 6.9 (44.4) | 8.3 (46.9) | 10.0 (50.0) | 11.6 (52.9) | 9.0 (48.2) |
| Record low °C (°F) | 3.3 (37.9) | 3.4 (38.1) | 1.8 (35.2) | 0.7 (33.3) | −1.6 (29.1) | −2.8 (27.0) | −2.8 (27.0) | −1.8 (28.8) | −0.8 (30.6) | 0.0 (32.0) | 0.3 (32.5) | 3.3 (37.9) | −2.8 (27.0) |
| Average rainfall mm (inches) | 43.7 (1.72) | 37.8 (1.49) | 37.0 (1.46) | 42.6 (1.68) | 39.2 (1.54) | 46.0 (1.81) | 44.5 (1.75) | 63.0 (2.48) | 55.6 (2.19) | 52.8 (2.08) | 50.7 (2.00) | 53.0 (2.09) | 565.9 (22.28) |
| Average rainy days (≥ 0.2 mm) | 9.5 | 9.1 | 11.3 | 11.1 | 12.0 | 12.4 | 14.1 | 15.3 | 15.7 | 15.0 | 13.5 | 11.7 | 150.7 |
| Average afternoon relative humidity (%) | 51 | 52 | 52 | 56 | 58 | 64 | 61 | 56 | 53 | 51 | 53 | 49 | 55 |
| Mean monthly sunshine hours | 257.3 | 226.0 | 210.8 | 177.0 | 148.8 | 132.0 | 151.9 | 179.8 | 195.0 | 232.5 | 234.0 | 248.0 | 2,393.1 |
| Percentage possible sunshine | 59 | 62 | 57 | 59 | 53 | 49 | 53 | 58 | 59 | 58 | 56 | 53 | 56 |
Source 1: Bureau of Meteorology (1991–2020 averages; extremes 1882–present)
Source 2: Bureau of Meteorology, Hobart Airport (sunshine hours)

Climate data for Launceston (Ti Tree Bend)
| Month | Jan | Feb | Mar | Apr | May | Jun | Jul | Aug | Sep | Oct | Nov | Dec | Year |
|---|---|---|---|---|---|---|---|---|---|---|---|---|---|
| Record high °C (°F) | 39.0 (102.2) | 34.4 (93.9) | 33.0 (91.4) | 27.7 (81.9) | 22.0 (71.6) | 18.4 (65.1) | 18.4 (65.1) | 20.3 (68.5) | 24.8 (76.6) | 28.7 (83.7) | 30.7 (87.3) | 33.8 (92.8) | 39.0 (102.2) |
| Mean daily maximum °C (°F) | 24.8 (76.6) | 24.6 (76.3) | 22.7 (72.9) | 18.9 (66.0) | 15.8 (60.4) | 13.3 (55.9) | 12.8 (55.0) | 13.8 (56.8) | 15.7 (60.3) | 18.2 (64.8) | 20.5 (68.9) | 22.7 (72.9) | 18.7 (65.7) |
| Mean daily minimum °C (°F) | 12.6 (54.7) | 12.5 (54.5) | 10.3 (50.5) | 7.5 (45.5) | 5.0 (41.0) | 2.9 (37.2) | 2.5 (36.5) | 3.5 (38.3) | 5.2 (41.4) | 7.0 (44.6) | 9.1 (48.4) | 10.9 (51.6) | 7.4 (45.3) |
| Record low °C (°F) | 2.5 (36.5) | 3.4 (38.1) | 0.5 (32.9) | −1.5 (29.3) | −3 (27) | −4.9 (23.2) | −5.2 (22.6) | −3.6 (25.5) | −3.4 (25.9) | −1.4 (29.5) | −2.0 (28.4) | 2.0 (35.6) | −5.2 (22.6) |
| Average rainfall mm (inches) | 51.5 (2.03) | 35.2 (1.39) | 38.8 (1.53) | 51.0 (2.01) | 63.1 (2.48) | 66.9 (2.63) | 78.3 (3.08) | 83.8 (3.30) | 65.5 (2.58) | 48.0 (1.89) | 52.9 (2.08) | 45.8 (1.80) | 680.8 (26.80) |
| Average rainy days (≥ 1 mm) | 4.8 | 4.6 | 4.4 | 6.5 | 7.6 | 8.3 | 9.7 | 10.9 | 10.0 | 7.5 | 7.0 | 5.8 | 87.1 |
| Average afternoon relative humidity (%) | 48 | 49 | 48 | 56 | 63 | 69 | 69 | 63 | 59 | 54 | 52 | 49 | 57 |
| Mean monthly sunshine hours | 285.2 | 256.9 | 241.8 | 198.0 | 155.0 | 135.0 | 142.6 | 170.5 | 201.0 | 254.2 | 267.0 | 282.1 | 2,589.3 |
Source 1: Bureau of Meteorology (1991–2020 averages; extremes 1980–present)
Source 2: Bureau of Meteorology, Launceston Airport (1981–2004 sunshine hours)

Climate data for Devonport (Devonport Airport)
| Month | Jan | Feb | Mar | Apr | May | Jun | Jul | Aug | Sep | Oct | Nov | Dec | Year |
|---|---|---|---|---|---|---|---|---|---|---|---|---|---|
| Record high °C (°F) | 33.2 (91.8) | 30.6 (87.1) | 29.0 (84.2) | 24.9 (76.8) | 20.7 (69.3) | 18.8 (65.8) | 17.2 (63.0) | 18.1 (64.6) | 20.0 (68.0) | 24.8 (76.6) | 28.2 (82.8) | 30.9 (87.6) | 33.2 (91.8) |
| Mean daily maximum °C (°F) | 21.6 (70.9) | 21.8 (71.2) | 20.5 (68.9) | 17.8 (64.0) | 15.4 (59.7) | 13.5 (56.3) | 12.8 (55.0) | 13.1 (55.6) | 14.3 (57.7) | 16.0 (60.8) | 18.0 (64.4) | 19.8 (67.6) | 17.0 (62.6) |
| Mean daily minimum °C (°F) | 12.4 (54.3) | 12.7 (54.9) | 11.0 (51.8) | 8.8 (47.8) | 6.8 (44.2) | 5.1 (41.2) | 4.7 (40.5) | 4.9 (40.8) | 6.1 (43.0) | 7.4 (45.3) | 9.3 (48.7) | 10.7 (51.3) | 8.3 (46.9) |
| Record low °C (°F) | 4.0 (39.2) | 4.2 (39.6) | 1.3 (34.3) | 0.5 (32.9) | −1.8 (28.8) | −1.9 (28.6) | −2.2 (28.0) | −1.6 (29.1) | −2.0 (28.4) | −0.3 (31.5) | 0.6 (33.1) | 1.6 (34.9) | −2.2 (28.0) |
| Average rainfall mm (inches) | 48.0 (1.89) | 35.3 (1.39) | 42.8 (1.69) | 56.8 (2.24) | 64.4 (2.54) | 71.8 (2.83) | 86.3 (3.40) | 81.5 (3.21) | 76.8 (3.02) | 55.2 (2.17) | 57.1 (2.25) | 47.4 (1.87) | 723.4 (28.48) |
| Average rainy days (≥ 1 mm) | 4.7 | 4.6 | 5.0 | 6.8 | 8.9 | 9.3 | 11.9 | 11.7 | 10.7 | 7.8 | 7.4 | 6.1 | 94.9 |
| Average afternoon relative humidity (%) | 61 | 61 | 59 | 62 | 66 | 68 | 69 | 68 | 66 | 63 | 65 | 61 | 64 |
| Mean monthly sunshine hours | 263.5 | 240.1 | 210.8 | 171.0 | 142.6 | 132.0 | 136.4 | 151.9 | 186.0 | 232.5 | 246.0 | 257.3 | 2,370.1 |
Source 1: Bureau of Meteorology
Source 2: Bureau of Meteorology (1981–1996 sunshine hours)

Climate data for Strahan, Tasmania
| Month | Jan | Feb | Mar | Apr | May | Jun | Jul | Aug | Sep | Oct | Nov | Dec | Year |
|---|---|---|---|---|---|---|---|---|---|---|---|---|---|
| Record high °C (°F) | 38.0 (100.4) | 38.6 (101.5) | 36.1 (97.0) | 27.8 (82.0) | 22.5 (72.5) | 19.9 (67.8) | 18.3 (64.9) | 22.1 (71.8) | 27.0 (80.6) | 31.9 (89.4) | 32.9 (91.2) | 36.7 (98.1) | 38.6 (101.5) |
| Mean daily maximum °C (°F) | 20.8 (69.4) | 21.3 (70.3) | 19.5 (67.1) | 16.8 (62.2) | 14.3 (57.7) | 12.6 (54.7) | 12.2 (54.0) | 13.1 (55.6) | 14.4 (57.9) | 16.1 (61.0) | 17.9 (64.2) | 19.8 (67.6) | 16.6 (61.9) |
| Mean daily minimum °C (°F) | 10.7 (51.3) | 10.8 (51.4) | 9.8 (49.6) | 8.4 (47.1) | 7.4 (45.3) | 5.5 (41.9) | 5.2 (41.4) | 5.7 (42.3) | 6.3 (43.3) | 7.3 (45.1) | 8.3 (46.9) | 9.7 (49.5) | 7.9 (46.2) |
| Record low °C (°F) | 0.6 (33.1) | 2.6 (36.7) | 0.8 (33.4) | −0.2 (31.6) | −0.4 (31.3) | −3.0 (26.6) | −2.7 (27.1) | −2.5 (27.5) | −2.4 (27.7) | −1.1 (30.0) | 0.9 (33.6) | 1.1 (34.0) | −3.0 (26.6) |
| Average precipitation mm (inches) | 82.5 (3.25) | 68.8 (2.71) | 105.7 (4.16) | 114.0 (4.49) | 158.5 (6.24) | 155.3 (6.11) | 181.6 (7.15) | 181.1 (7.13) | 151.5 (5.96) | 119.3 (4.70) | 94.0 (3.70) | 94.6 (3.72) | 1,552.2 (61.11) |
| Average precipitation days | 15.9 | 12.9 | 18.1 | 19.4 | 23.2 | 21.7 | 23.5 | 25.0 | 23.1 | 21.9 | 18.5 | 18.2 | 241.4 |
| Average afternoon relative humidity (%) | 62 | 60 | 64 | 69 | 75 | 76 | 75 | 71 | 69 | 64 | 61 | 63 | 67 |
Source: Bureau of Meteorology

Climate data for Burnie (Round Hill)
| Month | Jan | Feb | Mar | Apr | May | Jun | Jul | Aug | Sep | Oct | Nov | Dec | Year |
|---|---|---|---|---|---|---|---|---|---|---|---|---|---|
| Record high °C (°F) | 33.8 (92.8) | 30.8 (87.4) | 28.9 (84.0) | 26.2 (79.2) | 20.6 (69.1) | 18.8 (65.8) | 18.3 (64.9) | 18.9 (66.0) | 22.4 (72.3) | 23.7 (74.7) | 31.5 (88.7) | 31.2 (88.2) | 33.8 (92.8) |
| Mean daily maximum °C (°F) | 21.2 (70.2) | 21.5 (70.7) | 20.3 (68.5) | 18.0 (64.4) | 15.6 (60.1) | 13.7 (56.7) | 13.0 (55.4) | 13.4 (56.1) | 14.6 (58.3) | 16.1 (61.0) | 18.1 (64.6) | 19.6 (67.3) | 17.1 (62.8) |
| Mean daily minimum °C (°F) | 13.3 (55.9) | 13.8 (56.8) | 12.5 (54.5) | 10.8 (51.4) | 9.1 (48.4) | 7.3 (45.1) | 6.6 (43.9) | 6.7 (44.1) | 7.4 (45.3) | 8.5 (47.3) | 10.3 (50.5) | 11.7 (53.1) | 9.8 (49.6) |
| Record low °C (°F) | 5.2 (41.4) | 5.8 (42.4) | 3.6 (38.5) | 3.0 (37.4) | 1.8 (35.2) | 0.2 (32.4) | −1.0 (30.2) | 0.2 (32.4) | 0.4 (32.7) | 1.6 (34.9) | 2.7 (36.9) | 3.1 (37.6) | −1.0 (30.2) |
| Average precipitation mm (inches) | 43.0 (1.69) | 33.9 (1.33) | 42.7 (1.68) | 67.7 (2.67) | 80.3 (3.16) | 97.0 (3.82) | 104.5 (4.11) | 104.0 (4.09) | 92.5 (3.64) | 74.0 (2.91) | 63.0 (2.48) | 62.1 (2.44) | 865.5 (34.07) |
| Average rainy days (≥ 0.2 mm) | 9.9 | 7.1 | 9.0 | 11.0 | 13.8 | 15.0 | 17.1 | 17.4 | 16.5 | 14.6 | 11.9 | 10.3 | 153.6 |
| Mean daily sunshine hours | 8.2 | 7.7 | 6.2 | 5.3 | 4.1 | 4.0 | 4.1 | 4.5 | 5.3 | 6.8 | 7.3 | 7.5 | 5.9 |
Source 1: Bureau of Meteorology
Source 2: Bureau of Meteorology (1965–1993 sunshine hours)

Climate data for Mount Read (1,120 m AMSL)
| Month | Jan | Feb | Mar | Apr | May | Jun | Jul | Aug | Sep | Oct | Nov | Dec | Year |
|---|---|---|---|---|---|---|---|---|---|---|---|---|---|
| Record high °C (°F) | 30.4 (86.7) | 29.5 (85.1) | 27.9 (82.2) | 19.0 (66.2) | 15.3 (59.5) | 11.4 (52.5) | 10.0 (50.0) | 12.5 (54.5) | 16.2 (61.2) | 22.6 (72.7) | 24.5 (76.1) | 27.6 (81.7) | 30.4 (86.7) |
| Mean daily maximum °C (°F) | 14.4 (57.9) | 14.2 (57.6) | 12.0 (53.6) | 8.9 (48.0) | 6.4 (43.5) | 4.7 (40.5) | 3.7 (38.7) | 3.9 (39.0) | 5.6 (42.1) | 7.8 (46.0) | 10.8 (51.4) | 12.1 (53.8) | 8.7 (47.7) |
| Mean daily minimum °C (°F) | 5.8 (42.4) | 6.2 (43.2) | 5.1 (41.2) | 3.4 (38.1) | 2.2 (36.0) | 1.0 (33.8) | 0.2 (32.4) | −0.1 (31.8) | 0.4 (32.7) | 1.4 (34.5) | 3.2 (37.8) | 4.1 (39.4) | 2.7 (36.9) |
| Record low °C (°F) | −1.2 (29.8) | −0.8 (30.6) | −4.7 (23.5) | −4.5 (23.9) | −3.9 (25.0) | −5.2 (22.6) | −5.0 (23.0) | −5.3 (22.5) | −5.1 (22.8) | −5.0 (23.0) | −4.0 (24.8) | −2.3 (27.9) | −5.3 (22.5) |
| Average precipitation mm (inches) | 201.1 (7.92) | 174.4 (6.87) | 264.2 (10.40) | 283.7 (11.17) | 397.4 (15.65) | 341.1 (13.43) | 391.5 (15.41) | 336.3 (13.24) | 377.1 (14.85) | 397.6 (15.65) | 220.4 (8.68) | 292.2 (11.50) | 3,628.1 (142.84) |
| Average precipitation days | 19.1 | 17.4 | 22.5 | 24.0 | 26.7 | 25.9 | 26.6 | 25.6 | 25.8 | 25.9 | 21.2 | 21.7 | 282.4 |
| Average relative humidity (%) | 76 | 75 | 84 | 88 | 94 | 92 | 95 | 93 | 91 | 84 | 77 | 80 | 86 |

Climate data for Liawenee (1,057 m AMSL)
| Month | Jan | Feb | Mar | Apr | May | Jun | Jul | Aug | Sep | Oct | Nov | Dec | Year |
|---|---|---|---|---|---|---|---|---|---|---|---|---|---|
| Record high °C (°F) | 32.3 (90.1) | 31.2 (88.2) | 28.6 (83.5) | 22.9 (73.2) | 20.1 (68.2) | 14.5 (58.1) | 12.0 (53.6) | 17.1 (62.8) | 18.5 (65.3) | 25.3 (77.5) | 27.4 (81.3) | 31.2 (88.2) | 32.3 (90.1) |
| Mean daily maximum °C (°F) | 19.1 (66.4) | 18.4 (65.1) | 16.1 (61.0) | 12.4 (54.3) | 9.0 (48.2) | 6.6 (43.9) | 5.6 (42.1) | 6.5 (43.7) | 9.0 (48.2) | 12.0 (53.6) | 15.0 (59.0) | 16.6 (61.9) | 12.2 (54.0) |
| Mean daily minimum °C (°F) | 5.4 (41.7) | 5.2 (41.4) | 3.8 (38.8) | 1.8 (35.2) | 0.2 (32.4) | −1.0 (30.2) | −1.6 (29.1) | −1.3 (29.7) | −0.5 (31.1) | 0.7 (33.3) | 2.8 (37.0) | 3.9 (39.0) | 1.6 (34.9) |
| Record low °C (°F) | −3.9 (25.0) | −3.6 (25.5) | −6.9 (19.6) | −7.7 (18.1) | −10.5 (13.1) | −11.2 (11.8) | −12.2 (10.0) | −14.2 (6.4) | −10.7 (12.7) | −7.9 (17.8) | −6.8 (19.8) | −4.5 (23.9) | −14.2 (6.4) |
| Average precipitation mm (inches) | 48.9 (1.93) | 37.4 (1.47) | 64.5 (2.54) | 65.9 (2.59) | 89.4 (3.52) | 104.3 (4.11) | 119.7 (4.71) | 128.8 (5.07) | 110.5 (4.35) | 69.2 (2.72) | 63.5 (2.50) | 59.1 (2.33) | 923.0 (36.34) |
| Average precipitation days | 9.4 | 9.3 | 12.3 | 12.9 | 16.5 | 17.5 | 19.7 | 20.6 | 17.7 | 15.9 | 14.1 | 13.0 | 178.9 |
| Mean monthly sunshine hours | 297.6 | 245.8 | 235.6 | 180.0 | 139.5 | 105.0 | 120.9 | 161.2 | 201.0 | 232.5 | 261.0 | 272.8 | 2,452.9 |
Source: Bureau of Meteorology

== Soil ==
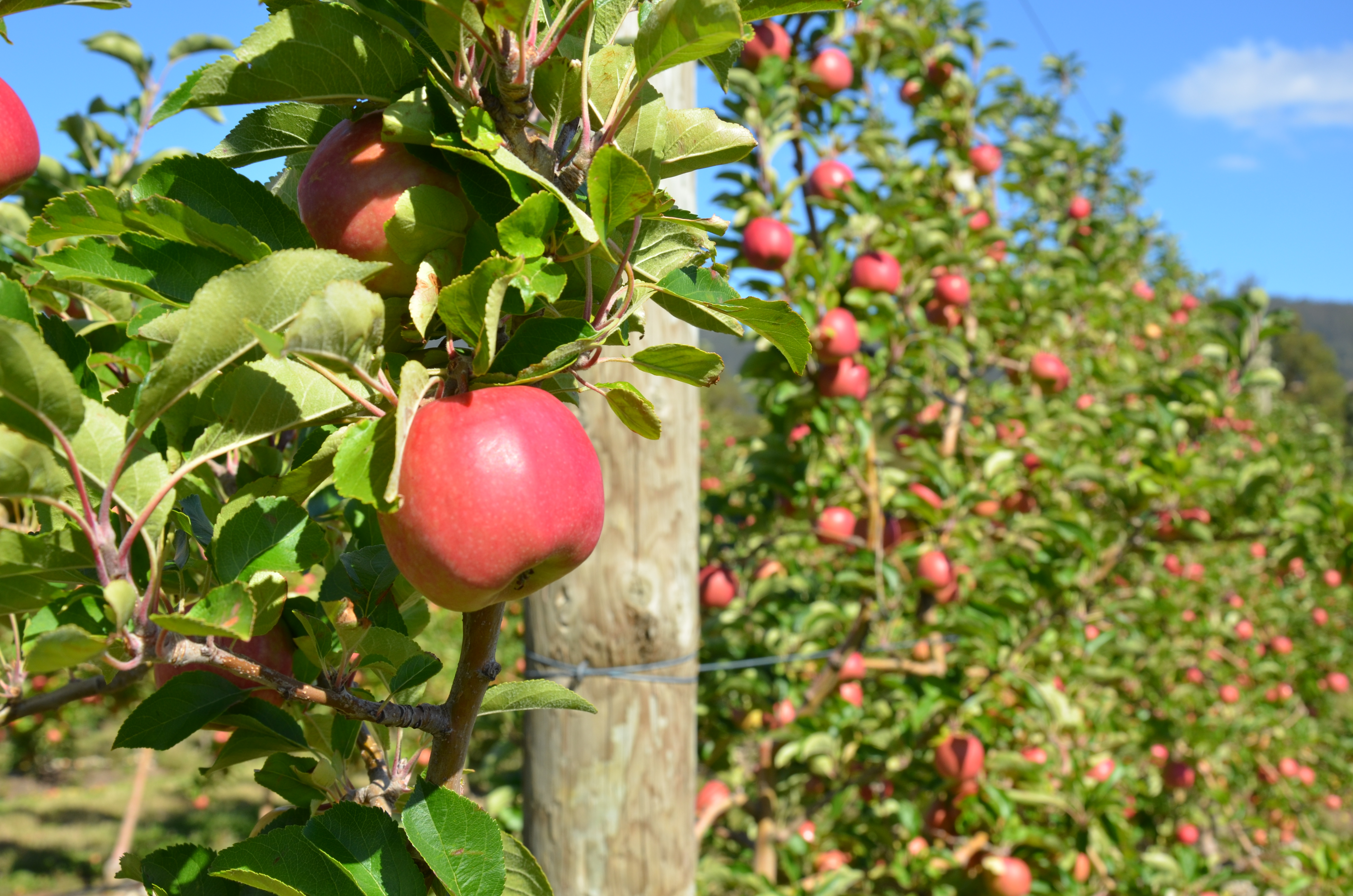
An apple orchard in the "Apple Isle"

Despite the presence of some Quaternary glaciation, Tasmania's soils are not more fertile than those of mainland Australia, largely because most are severely leached and the areas with driest climates (least leaching) were unaffected by glaciation or alluvia derived therefrom. Most soils on the Bass Strait Islands, the east coast and western Tasmania are very infertile spodosols or psamments, with some even less fertile "lateritic podzolic soils" in the latter region. Most of these lands are thus not used for agriculture, but there is much productive forestry in Tasmania—which remains one of the state's major industries.

On the north coast, apart from some relatively fertile alluvial soils used for fruit-growing, there are also deep red, easily workable soils known as "krasnozems" ("red land"). These soils are highly acidic and fix phosphate very effectively, but their extremely favourable physical properties make them extensively used for dairying, beef cattle and fodder crops.

The Midlands and the Lower Derwent present a different story from the rest of the state. Owing to a relatively dry climate and alkaline (mostly dolerite) parent material, these soils are relatively unleached and contain lime in the deeper subsoil. They are mostly classified as "prairie soils" or "brown earths" and bear some resemblance to the chernozems of Russia and North America, although they are much lower in available phosphorus and somewhat acidic in the surface levels. Their higher nutrient levels, however, allow them to support productive pasture, and large numbers of sheep are grazed in these regions. Some grain crops are also grown in the driest areas. In the alluvial areas of southeastern Tasmania, rich alluvial soils permit apples to be grown.

Tasmania became known as the "Apple Isle" because for many years it was one of the world's major apple producers. Apples are still grown in large numbers, particularly in southern Tasmania.

== Ecology and conservation ==
=== Flora and fauna ===
Tasmania has extremely diverse vegetation, from the heavily grazed grassland of the dry Midlands to the tall evergreen eucalypt forest, alpine heathlands and large areas of cool temperate rainforests and moorlands in the rest of the state. Many species are unique to Tasmania and some are related to species in South America and New Zealand through ancestors which grew on the supercontinent of Gondwana, 50 million years ago. Nothofagus gunnii, commonly known as Australian beech, is Australia's only temperate native deciduous tree and is found exclusively in Tasmania. Eucalyptus regnans (mountain ash) is the tallest flowering plant and hardwood in the world, reaching 100 m (328 ft).

Tasmania also has a number of native edibles, known as bush tucker in Australia.

Tasmania has many endemic species. Some, such as the platypus are larger than their mainland relatives. The island of Tasmania was home to the thylacine, a marsupial which resembled a fossa or some say a wild dog. Known colloquially as the Tasmanian tiger for the distinctive striping across its back, it became extinct in mainland Australia much earlier because of competition by the dingo, introduced in prehistoric times. Owing to persecution by farmers, government-funded bounty hunters and, in the final years, collectors for overseas museums, it appears to have been exterminated in Tasmania. The Tasmanian devil became the largest carnivorous marsupial in the world following the extinction of the thylacine in 1936, and is now found in the wild only in Tasmania. Tasmania was one of the last regions of Australia to be introduced to domesticated dogs. Dogs were brought from Britain in 1803 for hunting kangaroos and emus. This introduction completely transformed Aboriginal society, as it helped them to successfully compete with European hunters, and was more important than the introduction of guns for the Aboriginal people.

Tasmania is a hotspot for giant habitat trees and the large animal species that occupy them, notably the endangered Tasmanian wedge-tailed eagle (Aquila audax fleayi), the Tasmanian masked owl (Tyto novaehollandiae castanops), the Tasmanian giant freshwater crayfish (Astacopsis gouldi), the yellow wattlebird (Anthochaera paradoxa), the green rosella (Platycercus caledonicus) and others. Tasmania is also home to the world's only three migratory parrots, the critically endangered Orange-bellied parrot (Neophema chrysogaster), the Blue-winged parrot (Neophema chrysostoma), and the fastest parrot in the world, the swift parrot (Lathamus discolor). Tasmania has 12 endemic species of bird in total.

=== Conservation ===
Like the rest of Australia, Tasmania suffers from an endangered species problem. In particular, many important Tasmanian subspecies and world-significant species of animal are classified as at risk in some way. A famous example is the Tasmanian devil, which is endangered due to devil facial tumour disease. Some species have already gone extinct, primarily due to human interference, such as in the case of the thylacine or the Tasmanian emu. In Tasmania, there are about 90 endangered, vulnerable, or threatened vertebrate species classified by the state or Commonwealth governments. Because of a reliance on roads and private vehicle transport, and a high concentration of animal populations divided by this development, Tasmania has the worst (per kilometre) roadkill rate in the world, with 32 animals killed per hour and at least 300,000 per year.

Protected areas of Tasmania cover 21% of the island's land area in the form of national parks. The Tasmanian Wilderness World Heritage Area was inscribed by UNESCO in 1982, where it is globally significant because "most UNESCO World Heritage sites meet only one or two of the ten criteria for that status. The Tasmanian Wilderness World Heritage Area meets 7 out of 10 criteria. Only one other place on earth—China’s Mount Taishan—meets that many criteria". Controversy surrounds the decision in 2014 by the Abbott federal Liberal government to request the area's delisting and opening for resource exploration (before it was rejected by the UN Committee at Doha), and the current mining and deforestation in the state's Tarkine region, the largest single temperate rainforest in Australia.

== See also ==
- Climate of Australia
- Geography of Victoria
- Geography of South Australia
