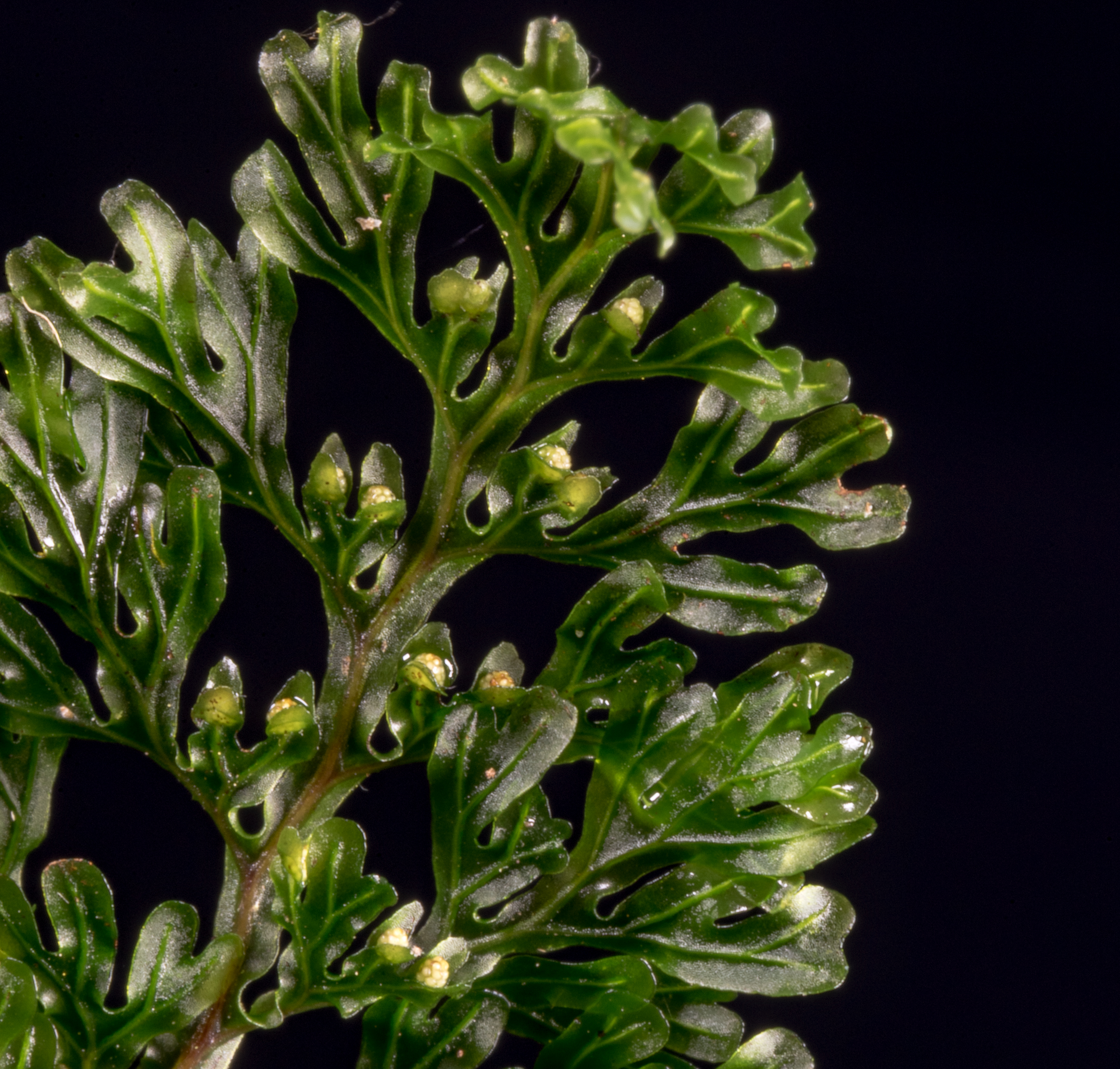

Scientific classification
- Kingdom: Plantae
- Clade: Tracheophytes
- Division: Polypodiophyta
- Class: Polypodiopsida
- Order: Hymenophyllales
- Family: Hymenophyllaceae
- Genus: Hymenophyllum
- Species: H. australe

Binomial name
- Hymenophyllum australe Willd

Synonyms
- Mecodium australe Hymenophyllum atrovirens

= Hymenophyllum australe =

Austral filmy-fern

Species of fern

Hymenophyllum australe, commonly known as austral filmy fern, is a relatively large rupestral and epiphytic fern, indigenous to eastern Australia and New Zealand. It belongs to the unique Hymenophyllum genus (filmy ferns), which are characterised by their thin membranous fronds that are seldom more than one cell thick, with the exception of regions over and around veins. Hymenophyllum australe is distinctive in that the fronds are typically thicker than other Hymenophyllum species, often being up to 2-3 cells thick.

Hymenophyllum australe is inconspicuous and will typically form matted patches together with mosses and liverworts. In Australia it takes on an epiphytic approach, commonly seen to clothe roots, trunks and rocks to form a dense mat of foliage; while in New Zealand it adopts a more rheophytic approach, preferring rocks or tree trunks in or close to water.

It has dark green fronds, which are distinctly deltoid in shape, with entire ultimate segment margins, each containing a single conspicuous vein. It is recognised by its winged fronds, which are initially relatively broad (several millimetres wide) but gradually taper from the rachis along the stipe.

== Description ==
Hymenophyllum australe are rupestral or epiphytic ferns. The rhizomes are long-creeping, fine (typically 0.2-0.5 mm in diameter), branched and possess bare scattered hairs typically clustered near the base of the stipe. Stomata are absent.

Characteristic of the Hymenophyllum genus, the sori are terminal on segments (see sketch below) and encompass a two-lipped indusium (protective cover), which often has notched margins. The sori are numerous and borne singly or paired. The receptacle is short and enclosed within indusial flaps. The species is homosporous, with spores trilete, greenish and slightly roughened.

The stipes are winged almost to the base, often crinkled and emanate at intervals along the rhizome. The fronds are dark green, dull and membranous, ranging in size from 38 to 210 mm long; they are triangular to ovate in shape and pinnate to tripinnate. The rachises are winged, glabrous, dark brown proximally and pale brown distally. The ultimate lamina segments are narrowly oblong and have a spreading finger-like appearance; the margins are entire, with each ultimate segment containing a single conspicuous vein.

== Taxonomy and naming ==
Hymenophyllum australe was first formally described in 1810 by Carl Ludwig Willdenow in the published Species Plantarum Edition 4, under the basionym of Mecodium australe.

The botanical genus name Hymenophyllum is derived from the Greek hymen, meaning membrane, and phyllon, a leaf, referring to the delicate membranous leaf, while the specific epithet, australe, is derived from the Latin australis, meaning southern, in reference to its occurrence in Australia and New Zealand.

Notably, New Zealand populations of Hymenophyllum australe were previously divided into a separate species, Hymenophyllum atrovirens, and interpreted as endemic to New Zealand. However, given the absence of distinguishable morphological characters, in addition to recent molecular evidence demonstrating pronounced similarity of the chloroplast DNA sequences of the Australian and New Zealand ferns, Hymenophyllum atrovirens is now considered conspecific with Hymenophyllum australe.

Hymenophyllum atrovirens was initially described in 1845 by English botanist William Colenso in his collections from Lake Waikaremoana in 1841.

== Distribution ==
Hymenophyllum australe is a common fern species of eastern Australia, principally located in the rainforests and fern gullies. It is present in Victoria, from the Otways through to Gippsland and was formally present on the Mornington Peninsula, but recently appears extinct in this area owing to bushfires.

It is also found in Tasmania, southern Queensland and New South Wales, in particular the Blue Mountains area. Hymenophyllum australe is also present on both the north and south islands of New Zealand, although there it is less common than in Australia.

In Tasmania and New Zealand it has been noted the wings of the fronds are typically smaller and the segments less wrinkled.

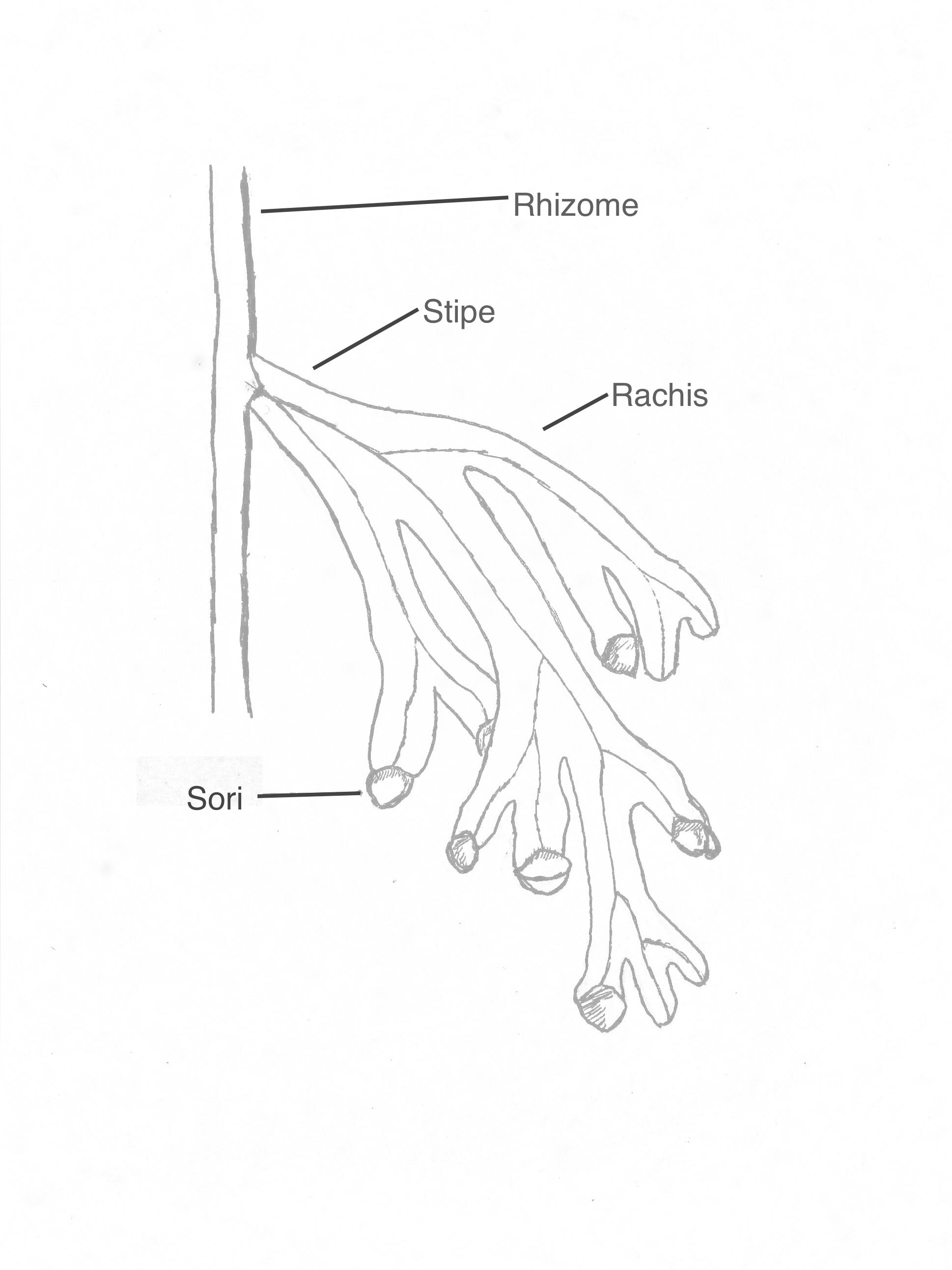
Sketch of Hymenophyllum australe frond. Highlighting the single conspicuous single vein in each ultimate segment and terminal sori.

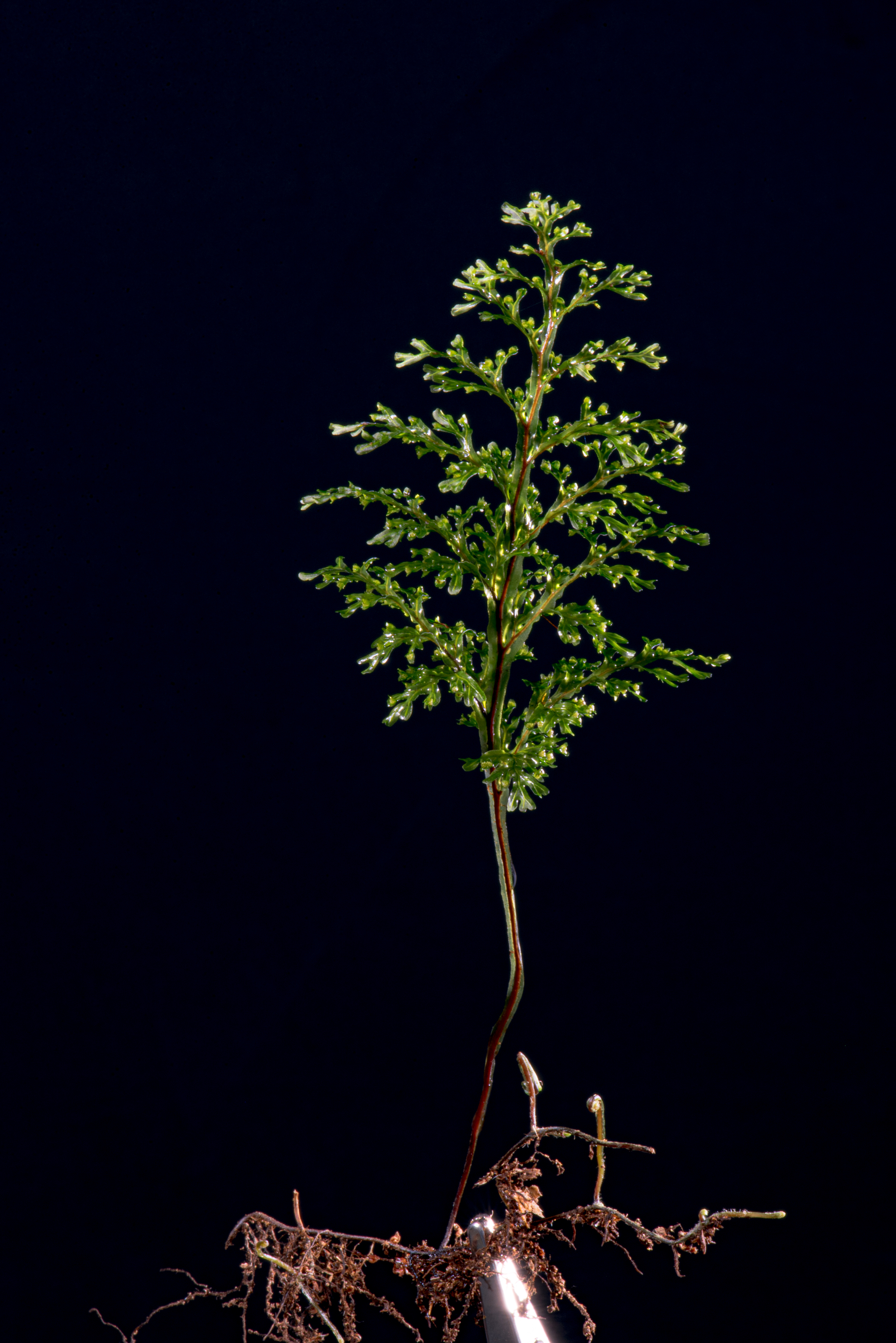
Hymenophyllum australe, picture by Robert Wiltshire.

.

Regions in New Zealand where Hymenophyllum australe has been recognised
North Island	Northland, Auckland, Volcanic Plateau, Gisborne, Taranaki, Southern North Island
South Island	Western Nelson, Canterbury, Otago, Fiordland, Stewart Island

Regions in Australia where Hymenophyllum australe has been recognised
Victoria	Gippsland Plain, Otway Plain, Otway Ranges, Warrnambool Plain, Central Victorian Uplands, East Gippsland Lowlands, East Gippsland Uplands, Wilsons Promontory, Highlands-Southern Fall, Highlands-Northern Fall, Strzelecki Ranges, Highlands-Far East, Victorian Alps
Queensland	South-east
New South Wales	North Coast, Central Coast, South Coast, Central Tablelands
Tasmania	Tasmanian Southern Ranges, Tasmanian West, Tasmanian South East, Ben Lomond, Circular Head, Tasmanian Northern Slopes, Furneaux, Tasmanian Central Highlands

== Habitat ==
Filmy ferns are typically small in size and limited to wet or misty areas due to the thin, delicate nature of their fronds. Water is rapidly lost under a dry atmosphere and in consequence Hymenophyllum australe will shrivel and collapse as filmy-ferns possess no strengthening tissues in their fronds; being entirely dependent on water pressure to maintain turgidity. As a result, these fragile ferns grow optimally where the air is moist.

In New Zealand, Hymenophyllum australe is heavily constrained to growing on rocks, or rarely low on tree trunks, either partially submerged or close to flowing water in shaded habitats. It almost displays a rheophytic habit and is seldom found away from waterways.

Conversely in Australia the species grows in a much broader range of habitats, expanding to rock further away from water and additionally as an epiphyte. It is common to wet forests and routinely forms curtains on tree-trunks, logs, wet rocks or on the walls of caves, given there is sufficient light present. In Australia, Hymenophyllum australe is found to display a strong association with tree-fern trunks, commonly perceived to adorn tree-ferns from top to bottom. In Tasmania, Hymenophyllum australe was found to exhibit a significant preference to grow on the trunks of the more prevalent Dicksonia antarctica than the trunks of the rarer Cyathea cunninghamii tree-ferns.

== Reproduction ==
=== Sexual reproduction ===
Like all ferns, Hymenophyllum australe has a life cycle with two distinct phases: a minor haploid gametophyte stage, which grows from spores and produces the gametes, and a sporophyte stage which is diploid and yields spores from the sporangia.

The gametophytic generation begins with the formation of spores from the sporangia on the leaf of a sporophyte, under favourable conditions (adequate moisture, temperature, pH range and light intensity) these spores will germinate and subsequently develop into a filamentous prothallus (or gametophyte).

The prothallus in Hymenophyllum australe (including all Hymenophyllum species) is long and narrow and often referred to as ribbon-like. This is atypical of the archetypal heart-shaped prothallus seen in other ferns. The prothallus harbours sporadic marginal archegonial cushions and this is where the archegonia are borne, while the antheridia are borne on slender branches on the basal margins of the prothallus.

In the presence of water, spores germinate following a typical fern progression, with the antheridia trapped under the prothallus bursting to release the sperm cells. A chemical signal (sperm chemotaxis) is released from the archegonia which attracts the motile sperm cells towards it. Once the sperm cells reach the archegonium, they open and enable the male gamete to travel down to the ovum, with which it unites to induce fertilisation and form a zygote.

This fertilised zygote is diploid and develops into an embryo and sporophyte, or ‘true fern’ that is most readily recognised, while remaining embedded in the prothallus. The sporophyte is dependent on the prothallus for nutrition (parasitic) until the embryo forms its first roots and leaves, whereupon the sporophyte becomes independent and the prothallus subsequently dies. The cycle is complete when spores are produced on the sporophyte.

Notably, as in all ferns, water is required for successful sexual reproduction, with the fusion of the gametes entirely dependent on the availability of free water.

=== Asexual reproduction ===
Both gametophytes and sporophytes are capable of vegetative reproduction. In the gametophyte stage this is typically through regeneration of fresh prothalli from older ones, but it can also occur through gemmae which are more organised means of vegetative propagation.

It has been recognised that adverse growing conditions, such as drying, promotes abundant formation of gemmae, as vegetative reproduction does not involve the fusion of gametes and hence does not require water.

== Conservation status ==
Hymenophyllum australe in Australia is considered locally common within its preferred growing conditions. However, in New Zealand the conservation status of Hymenophyllum australe was reassessed in 2012 using the New Zealand Threat Classification System (NZTCS) to be "at risk to naturally uncommon".

== Cytology ==
Chromosome number = 36 (N=36).
