= Tasmanian Northern Midlands =

Bioregion in Tasmania, Australia

- Region
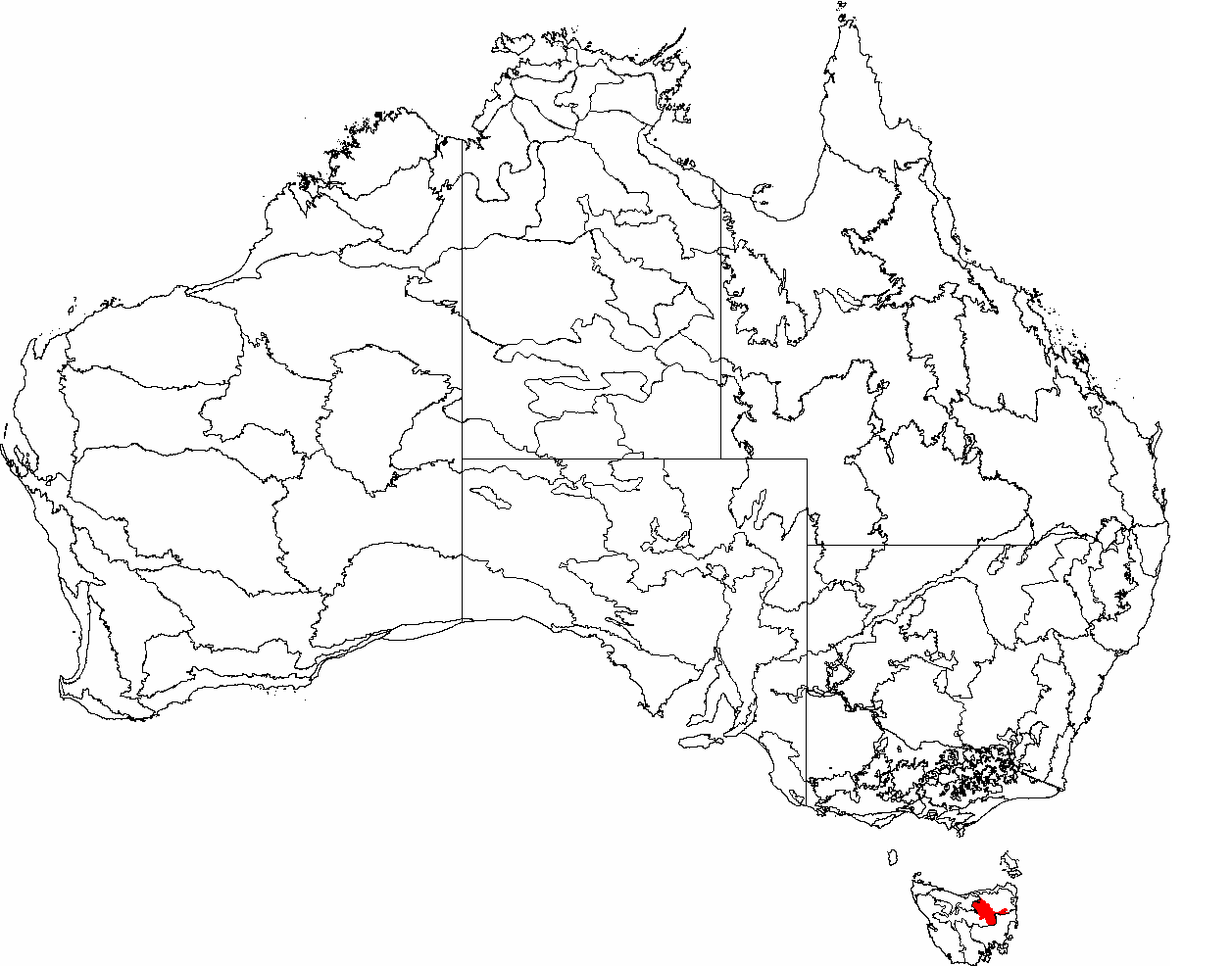
- The interim Australian bioregions, with the Tasmanian Northern Midlands in red
- Country: Australia
- State: Tasmania

Area
  - Total: 415 km^{2} (160 sq mi)
Regions around Tasmanian Northern Midlands
| Northern Slopes | Northern Slopes | Ben Lomond |
| Central Highlands | Tasmanian Northern Midlands | Ben Lomond |
| Southern Ranges | Southern Ranges | South East |

The Tasmanian Northern Midlands is an interim Australian bioregion located in northern midlands region of Tasmania, comprising 415,445 hectares (1,026,590 acres).

== See also ==
- Ecoregions in Australia
- Interim Biogeographic Regionalisation for Australia
- Regions of Tasmania
