= Regions of Tasmania =

Areas of Tasmania, Australia

In the Australian state of Tasmania, there are many areas which are commonly known by regional names. Regions are areas that share similar characteristics. These characteristics may be natural such as the Furneaux Islands, the coastline, or the Central Highlands. Alternatively, the characteristics may be cultural, such as a viticulture land use. Tasmania is divided by numerous regional boundaries, based on different characteristics. In many cases boundaries defined by different government agencies are coterminous and are often cited by the Australian and local media that tend to distinguish between North West, West Coast, Southern, and East Coast.

Some regions were historically identified in terms of land use. In the 1960s the Atlas of Tasmania was the definitive Tasmanian Government publication in relation to regional geographical variations in Tasmania.

== Local government ==
In Tasmania the third tier of elected government after the federal and state governments are the local government authorities, which are responsible for the local government areas. The types of LGAs in Tasmania are cities and councils.

Tasmania has 29 local government areas which have an elected council and carry out various functions delegated to them by the Tasmanian Government.

== Australian Bureau of Statistics ==
The Australian Bureau of Statistics has multiple regional structures for which it analyses and reports data. These regional structures derive from the Australian Standard Geographical Classification (AGSC). The AGSC defines at the very smallest level, the Census Collection District (CCD). These CCD's aggregate to form the Statistical Local Area (SLA), which is the common base unit for each of the larger regional structures. The boundaries of the SLA are designed to be typically coterminous with Local Government Areas unless the LGA does not fit entirely into a Statistical Subdivision (SSD), or is not of a comparative nature to other LGA's. Bureau of Statistics provides statistics for Local Government Areas, as well as three other statistical structures: Statistical Divisions, Statistical Regions, and Statistical Districts.

=== Statistical Divisions ===
Statistical Divisions (SD) form the main structural hierarchy of statistical analysis. These regions are structured to provide a broad range of social, demographic and economic statistics. The basis for the boundary delineations centre on socio-economic criteria. The five divisions for Tasmania are:

Greater Hobart, Southern, Northern, Mersey-Lyell, Off-Shore Areas & Migratory.

=== Statistical Regions ===
The Statistical Region (SR) structure was established in 1986 as a means for labor force analysis.

Greater Hobart, Southern, Northern, Mersey-Lyell.

=== Statistical Districts ===
The Statistical District (SDist) is a non-capital, urban region of one or more adjoining areas, with a population of 25,000 or more. The SDist is defined with consideration of a 20-year growth forecast. The SDist does not need to conform to LGA boundaries or to state territory boundaries. The two Statistical Districts in Tasmania are:

Launceston, Burnie-Devonport.

== Biogeographic regions ==
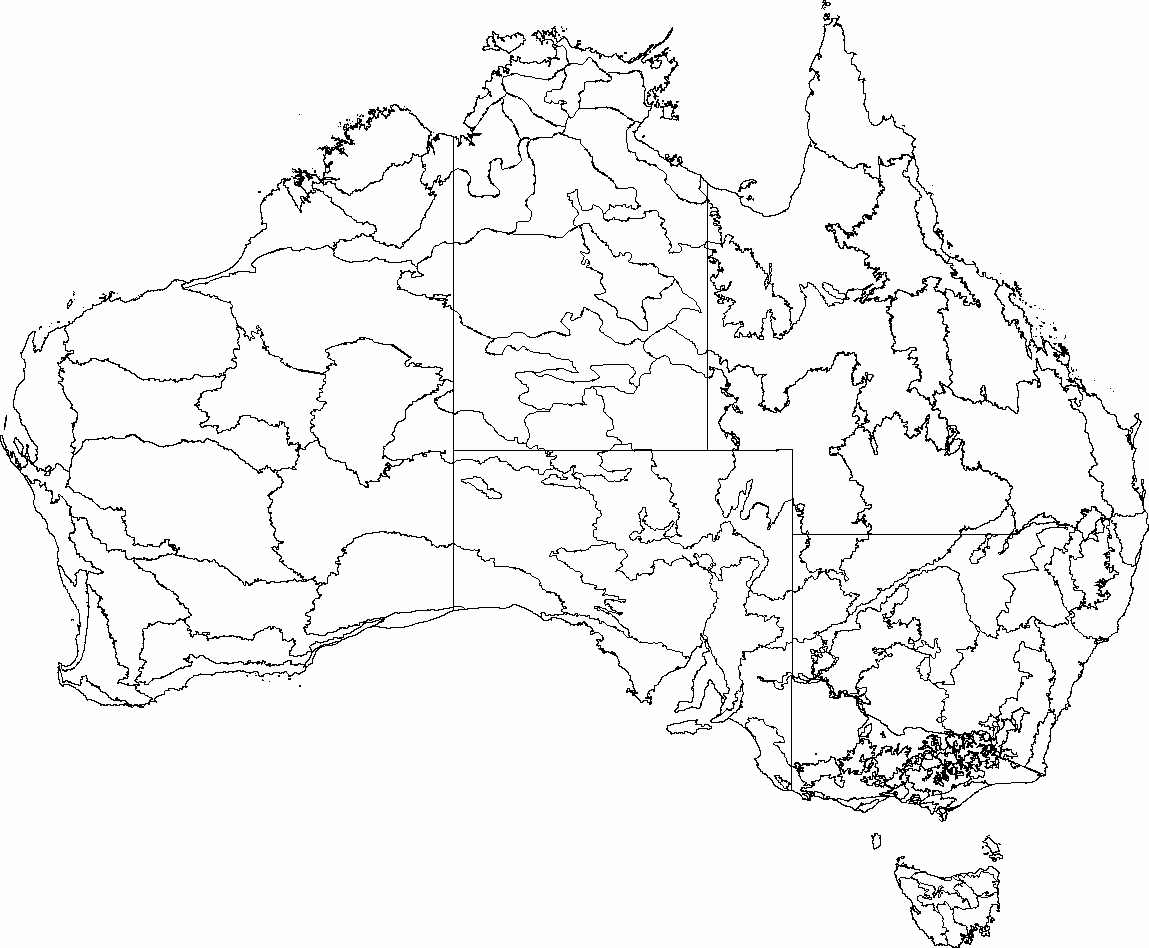
IBRA 6.1 regions map

The Interim Biogeographic Regionalisation for Australia (IBRA) is a biogeographic regionalisation of Australia; divided into 89 bioregions and 419 subregions. Each region is a land area made up of a group of interacting ecosystems that are repeated in similar form across the landscape. Regions and subregion cross state and territory boundaries. There are nine bioregions that are located within all or part of Tasmania:

- Ben Lomond
- Furneaux
- King
- Tasmanian Central Highlands
- Tasmanian Northern Midlands
- Tasmanian Northern Slopes
- Tasmanian Southern Ranges
- Tasmanian South East
- Tasmanian West

== Informal divisions ==
Informal divisions of Tasmania
Region name	Subregion name	Comments
Western	North West	North of the Pieman River mouth and proceeding round into the Bass Strait.
Western	South West	From Cape Sorell in the west to either South Cape or South East Cape in the east.
Southern	South West	From Cape Sorell in the west to either South Cape or South East Cape in the east.
Southern	South East	From South East Cape in the southwest, north to Hobart and through to Wineglass Bay.
Eastern	South East	From South East Cape in the southwest, north to Hobart and through to Wineglass Bay.
Eastern	Midlands	Inland, from north of Richmond in the south to Launceston in the north.
Eastern	North East	From Wineglass Bay in the south to the Bass Strait coast in the north.
Northern	Central Highlands	As its name implies, the centre of Tasmania, from Lake St Clair in the north to the lower River Derwent in the south east.
Northern	North West	From the Bass Strait coast in the north to Pieman River in the north west.

== Specific uses of regions for different purposes ==
=== Weather forecasting ===
Since 2013, the Australian Bureau of Meteorology (BOM) divided Tasmania into eleven land-based districts for the purpose weather forecasting. In addition, the Bureau detailed nine coastal districts and a further five inshore districts covering the bays and channels in the River Derwent lower estuary.

Land based districts

- Furneaux Islands
- North East
- East Coast
- Central North (including Launceston)
- Midlands
- South East (including Hobart)
- Upper Derwent Valley
- Central Plateau
- Western (includes South Western and Western Tasmania)
- North West Coast
- King Island

Coastal districts

- Far North West Coast
- Central West Coast
- Southwest Coast
- Southeast Coast
- Southeast Inshore
- Lower East Coast
- Upper East Coast
- East of Flinders Island
- Banks Strait (Larapuna)
- Central North Coast

=== Tasmanian Government ===
==== Other coastal regions ====
In some schemes a quadrant of the coast is made into four parts:

- North West and South West - Cape Sorell
- North West and North East - Devonport, Tasmania
- North East and South East - Bicheno, Tasmania
- South West and South East - South East Cape

In general terms, the usage is found in a number of forms:

- North West - generally starting north of the Pieman River mouth and proceeding round into the Bass Strait coast
- South West - generally starting at Cape Sorell and finishing at either South Cape or South East Cape
- South East - usually incorporates the region around Hobart and through to wineglass Bay or further north
- North East - usually referring to the coast from the Tamar River and proceeding round onto the East Coast

These regional schemes do not relate to the physical realities of the coast, or any of the coastal processes, but are simply organisational categorigisation.

=== Tourist regions ===
Tourism regions are a scheme of tourist promotion; some tourist regions are in sub-regions, or a component of separate regions, and others are grabs of separate regions.

Regions most commonly used for tourism purposes include:

- Hobart
- Huon Valley and D'Entrecasteaux Channel (Southeast)
- Derwent Valley and Central Highlands
- Launceston and the Tamar Valley
- Midlands
- North East
- Devonport and Cradle Valley
- West Coast and Wilderness.

As of 2015 Tourism Tasmania, a Tasmanian Government body, divided the state into five regions on the Tasmanian mainland, and two regions covering the two major Bass Strait islands:

- East Coast
- Flinders Island
- Hobart and South
- King Island
- Launceston and North
- North West
- West Coast

Zones have also been historically used for the purposes of public transport including: Hobart and surrounds, Launceston, Tamar and the North, North West Coast, East Coast, and Western Wilderness.

== Wine regions ==
- Huon Valley - south of Hobart
- North West - south of Devonport
- Tamar Valley - along the valley north of Launceston
- Pipers River - on the Georgetown to Bridport road.
- East Coast - between Bicheno in the north, and east of Sorell
- Coal River Valley - between Cambridge and north of Colebrook.
- Derwent Valley - between Hamilton and Hobart
- Southern - between Kingston and Southport

== See also ==
- List of islands of Tasmania
