= Ben Lomond bioregion =

Bioregion in Tasmania, Australia

Ben Lomond
- Region
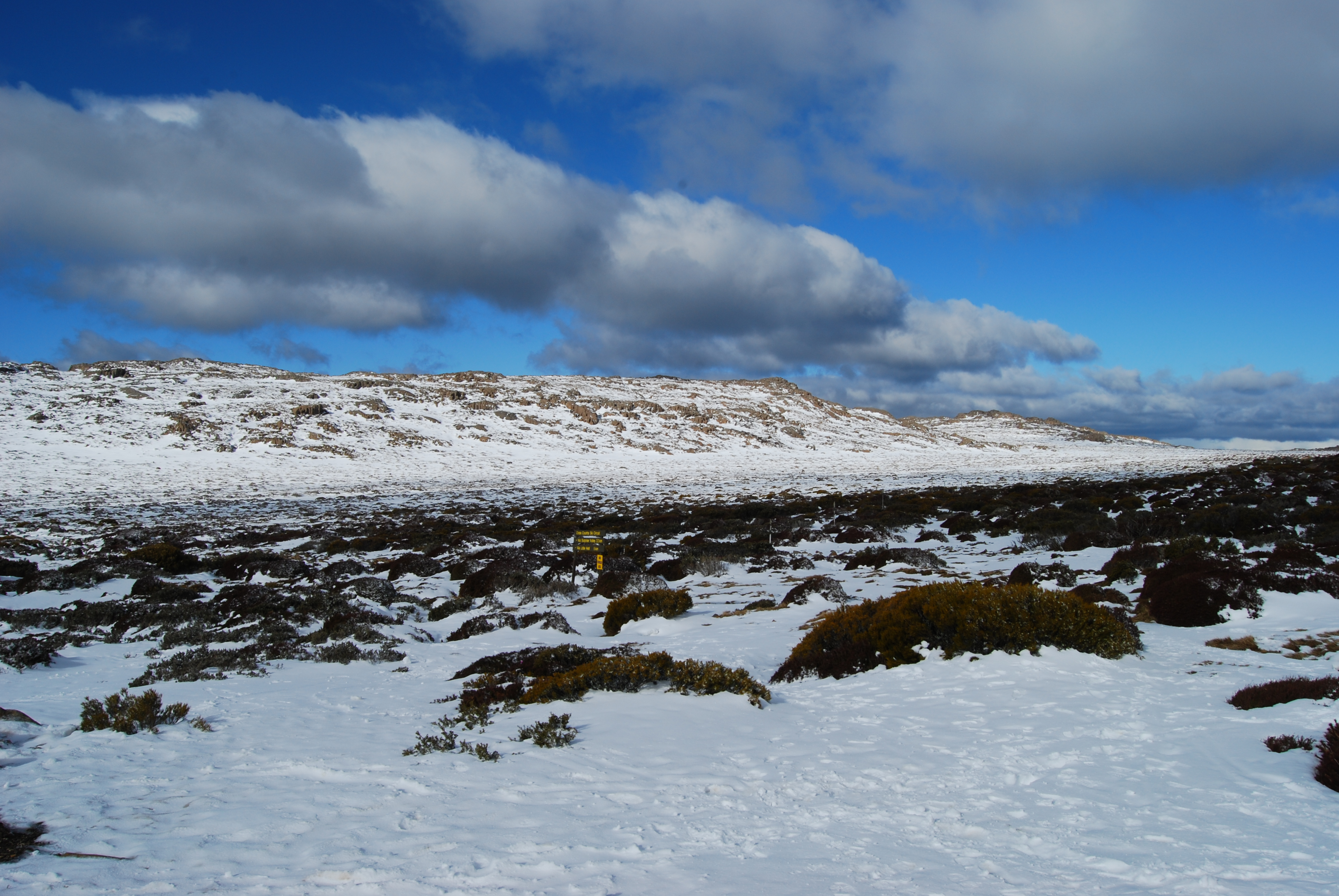
- Part of the Ben Lomond snowfields
- Country: Australia
- State: Tasmania

Area
  - Total: 657 km^{2} (254 sq mi)
Regions around Ben Lomond
Bass Strait	Bass Strait	Furneaux
Northern Slopes	Ben Lomond	Tasman Sea
Northern Midlands	South East	Tasman Sea

Ben Lomond is an interim Australian bioregion located in the north eastern region of Tasmania, comprising 657,500 hectares (1,625,000 acres).

== See also ==
- Ecoregions in Australia
- Interim Biogeographic Regionalisation for Australia
- Regions of Tasmania
