= Tasmanian West =

Bioegion in Tasmania, Australia

- Region
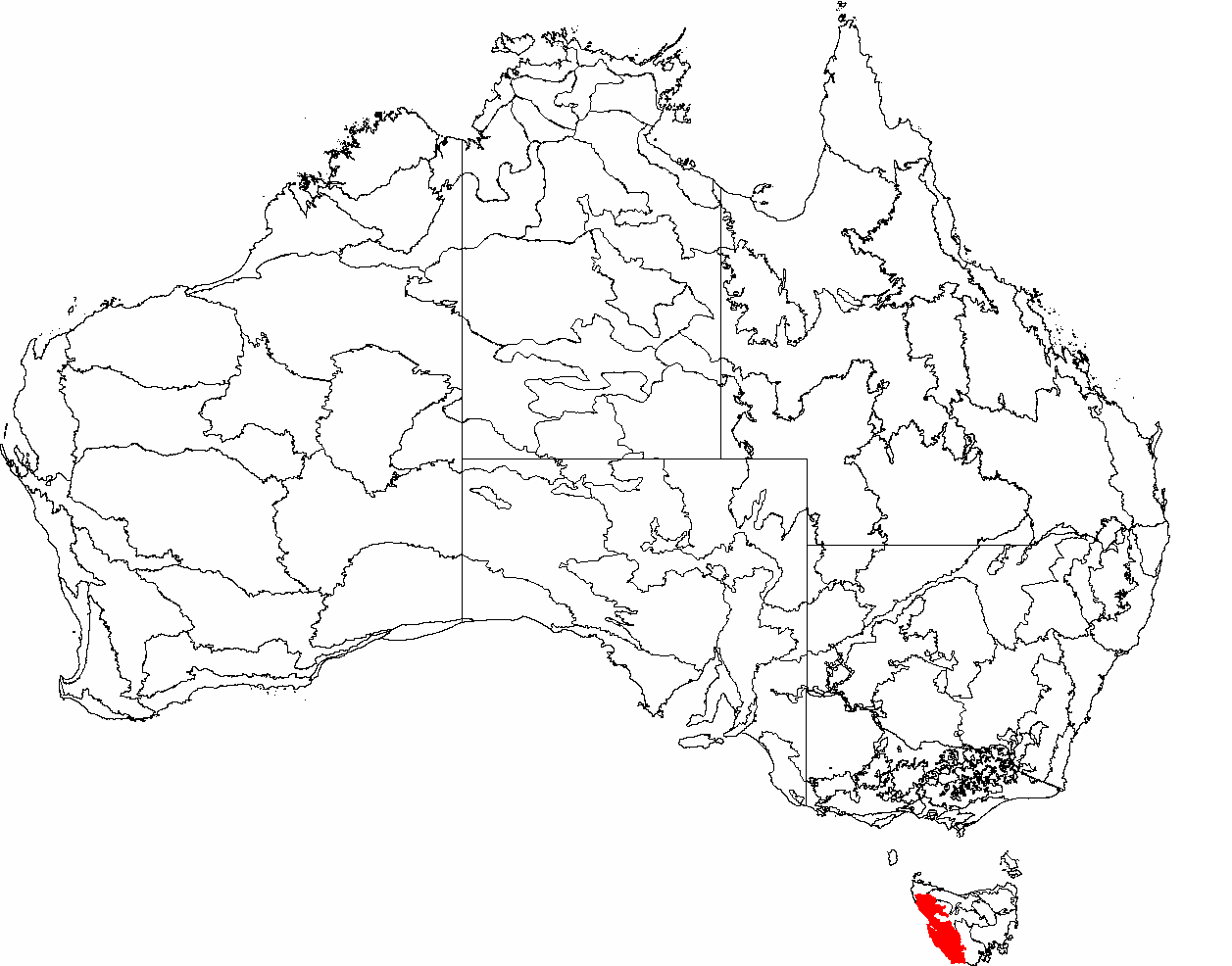
- The interim Australian bioregions, with the Tasmanian West in red
- Country: Australia
- State: Tasmania

Area
  - Total: 1,565 km^{2} (604 sq mi)
Regions around Tasmanian West
Bass Strait	King	Northern Slopes
Southern Ocean	Tasmanian West	Central Highlands
Southern Ocean	Southern Ranges	Southern Ranges

Tasmanian West is an interim Australian bioregion located in the western region of Tasmania, comprising 1,565,077 hectares (3,867,390 acres).

== See also ==
- Ecoregions in Australia
- Interim Biogeographic Regionalisation for Australia
- Regions of Tasmania
