= Furneaux bioregion =

Bioegion in Tasmania, Australia

Furneaux Tasmania
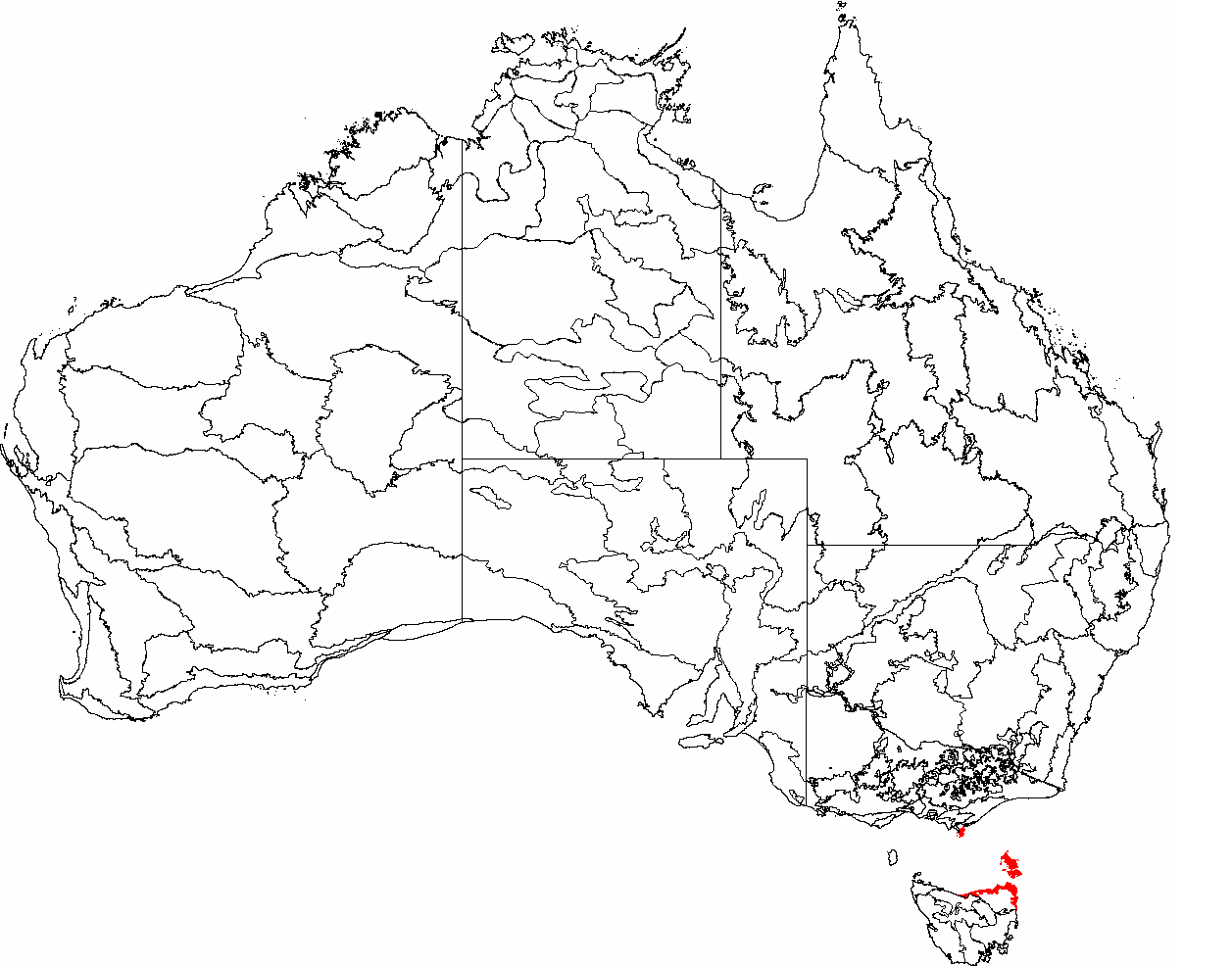
- The interim Australian bioregions, with Furneaux in red

- Coordinates: 40°10′S 148°05′E
- Area: 538 km^{2} (207.7 sq mi)
Localities around Furneaux:
Bass Strait	South East Coastal Plain	Bass Strait
Bass Strait	Furneaux	Bass Strait
Tasmanian Northern Slopes	Ben Lomond	Bass Strait

Furneaux is an interim Australian bioregion that comprises the Furneaux Group, consisting of over one hundred islands off the northeast coast of Tasmania, as well as the northeast corner of Tasmania and Wilson's Promontory on the Australian mainland. It spans an area of 537,543 hectares (1,328,300 acres).

Furneaux Island, situated at the eastern entrance to Bass Strait, is a haven for a diverse array of native plants and animals, including the Furneaux burrowing crayfish, a threatened and endemic Australian species.

== See also ==
- Ecoregions in Australia
- Regions of Tasmania
