= Geography of South Australia =

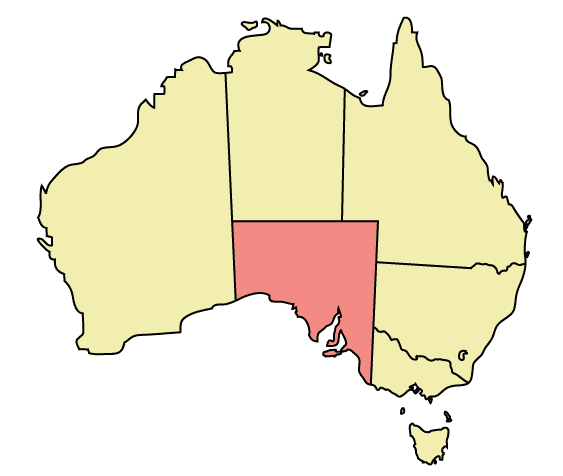
- Continent: Australia
- Coordinates: 30°S 135°E
- Area: Ranked 4th among states and territories
  - Total: 984,321 km^{2} (380,048 sq mi)
  - Land: 94.25%
  - Water: 5.75%
- Coastline: 3,815 km (2,371 mi)
- Borders: Land borders: Western Australia, Northern Territory, Queensland, New South Wales, Victoria
- Highest point: Mount Woodroffe; 1,435 m (4,708 ft)
- Lowest point: Lake Eyre -15 m (49 ft)
- Longest river: Murray River; 683 km (424 mi)
- Largest lake: Lake Eyre; 9690 km^{2}

The geography of South Australia incorporates the south central part of the continent of Australia. It is one of the six states of Australia. South Australia is bordered on the west by Western Australia, to the north by the Northern Territory, Queensland to the northeast, and both New South Wales and Victoria to the east. South Australia's south coast is flanked by the Great Australian Bight and the Southern Ocean.

The northern and western parts of the state are extremely arid, in central Australia, dominated by Lake Eyre and Lake Torrens, mostly dry salt lakes. This arid area is sparsely populated, with many large cattle stations, and significant areas protected as national parks, or as Aboriginal lands. The only significant roads through these areas are the Stuart Highway north from Port Augusta to the Northern Territory, the Eyre Highway across the Nullarbor Plain to Western Australia, and the Barrier Highway east to Broken Hill in New South Wales. These highways have corresponding railways: the Trans-Australian Railway going west and east, and the Adelaide–Darwin railway going north.

The coastline includes cliffs against the Great Australian Bight including the western side of Eyre Peninsula. The coast is less rugged on Spencer Gulf and Gulf St Vincent (separated by Yorke Peninsula), Fleurieu Peninsula, Encounter Bay and The Coorong. Bordering the east of Gulf St Vincent is the Temperate Grassland of South Australia.

The highest point in the state is Mount Woodroffe at 1,435 metres (4,708 ft) in the Musgrave Ranges in the northwest corner of the state. The main range is the Mount Lofty Ranges and Flinders Ranges extending approximately 800 kilometres (497 mi) from Fleurieu Peninsula along the eastern sides of Gulf St Vincent and Spencer Gulf respectively. About half the state is less than 150 m above sea level.

The arid north is delineated from the more fertile southeast by Goyder's Line, first surveyed in the 1860s, and which has proven to be a remarkably accurate northern boundary marking where sustainable agriculture can be carried out. Three deserts are contained within South Australia's borders: Great Victoria Desert, Strzelecki Desert and Sturt Stony Desert.

East of the Mount Lofty Ranges, the Murray River flows west from New South Wales and Victoria, then south adjacent to the ranges. The Murray River is the only large, permanent river in the state, and is a major water source for the state's primary city, Adelaide, and its surrounding regional communities.

== Climate ==
Köppen climate types in South Australia

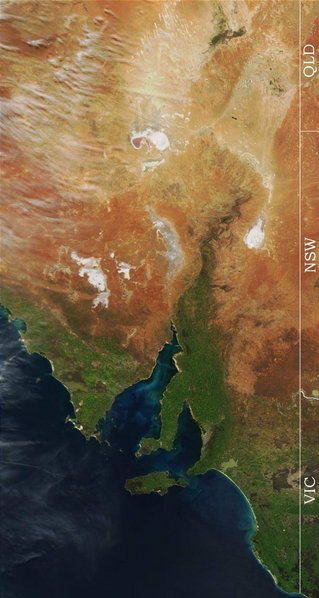
Satellite image of eastern South Australia. Note the dry lakes (white patches) in the north

Southern areas of South Australia have a Mediterranean climate, while the rest of the state has a drier arid climate and semi-arid climate. The state's mean temperature range is 29 °C in January and 15 °C in July. Daily temperatures in parts of the state in January & February can be as high as 48 °C. The highest maximum temperature in that state 50.7 °C (123.3 °F), was recorded at Oodnadatta on 2 January 1960. This is also the highest official temperature recorded in the whole of Australia. The lowest minimum temperature recorded in South Australia was -8.2 °C (17.2 °F), at Yongala on 20 July 1976.

=== Examples ===
Climate data for Adelaide (Köppen Csa)
Month	Jan	Feb	Mar	Apr	May	Jun	Jul	Aug	Sep	Oct	Nov	Dec	Year
Record high °C (°F)	47.7 (117.9)	44.7 (112.5)	42.2 (108.0)	36.9 (98.4)	31.1 (88.0)	25.4 (77.7)	23.1 (73.6)	30.4 (86.7)	34.3 (93.7)	39.0 (102.2)	43.0 (109.4)	45.2 (113.4)	47.7 (117.9)
Mean daily maximum °C (°F)	30.0 (86.0)	29.7 (85.5)	26.6 (79.9)	23.0 (73.4)	19.0 (66.2)	16.2 (61.2)	15.6 (60.1)	16.7 (62.1)	19.3 (66.7)	22.5 (72.5)	25.4 (77.7)	27.6 (81.7)	22.6 (72.7)
Daily mean °C (°F)	23.8 (74.8)	23.6 (74.5)	21.0 (69.8)	17.9 (64.2)	14.6 (58.3)	12.3 (54.1)	11.7 (53.1)	12.4 (54.3)	14.6 (58.3)	17.1 (62.8)	19.8 (67.6)	21.7 (71.1)	17.5 (63.5)
Mean daily minimum °C (°F)	17.6 (63.7)	17.5 (63.5)	15.3 (59.5)	12.7 (54.9)	10.2 (50.4)	8.3 (46.9)	7.7 (45.9)	8.1 (46.6)	9.9 (49.8)	11.7 (53.1)	14.1 (57.4)	15.8 (60.4)	12.4 (54.3)
Record low °C (°F)	9.2 (48.6)	9.5 (49.1)	7.2 (45.0)	4.3 (39.7)	1.5 (34.7)	−0.4 (31.3)	0.4 (32.7)	0.9 (33.6)	2.6 (36.7)	4.7 (40.5)	5.3 (41.5)	7.9 (46.2)	−0.4 (31.3)
Average rainfall mm (inches)	21.2 (0.83)	20.0 (0.79)	24.9 (0.98)	37.6 (1.48)	59.3 (2.33)	77.7 (3.06)	71.1 (2.80)	66.9 (2.63)	59.6 (2.35)	40.0 (1.57)	31.0 (1.22)	28.3 (1.11)	536.5 (21.12)
Average precipitation days (≥ 0.2 mm)	5.0	3.8	5.9	8.2	12.7	14.4	16.0	15.6	13.6	9.6	8.3	7.4	120.5
Average afternoon relative humidity (%)	36	36	40	45	55	61	59	54	50	44	40	38	47
Mean monthly sunshine hours	325.5	285.3	266.6	219.0	167.4	138.0	148.8	186.0	204.0	257.3	273.0	294.5	2,765.4
Source: Australian Bureau of Meteorology.

Climate data for Mount Gambier (Köppen Csb/Cfb)
Month	Jan	Feb	Mar	Apr	May	Jun	Jul	Aug	Sep	Oct	Nov	Dec	Year
Record high °C (°F)	44.1 (111.4)	44.9 (112.8)	41.3 (106.3)	35.8 (96.4)	28.5 (83.3)	21.6 (70.9)	22.4 (72.3)	26.6 (79.9)	32.2 (90.0)	34.4 (93.9)	41.2 (106.2)	45.9 (114.6)	45.9 (114.6)
Mean maximum °C (°F)	35.2 (95.4)	34.5 (94.1)	31.3 (88.3)	26.0 (78.8)	19.9 (67.8)	16.1 (61.0)	15.4 (59.7)	17.2 (63.0)	20.6 (69.1)	24.4 (75.9)	28.6 (83.5)	32.1 (89.8)	35.2 (95.4)
Mean daily maximum °C (°F)	25.9 (78.6)	26.0 (78.8)	23.6 (74.5)	20.0 (68.0)	16.4 (61.5)	14.1 (57.4)	13.5 (56.3)	14.5 (58.1)	16.2 (61.2)	18.7 (65.7)	21.4 (70.5)	23.7 (74.7)	19.5 (67.1)
Daily mean °C (°F)	19.0 (66.2)	19.2 (66.6)	17.3 (63.1)	14.5 (58.1)	12.0 (53.6)	10.1 (50.2)	9.6 (49.3)	10.2 (50.4)	11.5 (52.7)	13.1 (55.6)	15.2 (59.4)	17.1 (62.8)	14.1 (57.3)
Mean daily minimum °C (°F)	12.0 (53.6)	12.3 (54.1)	11.0 (51.8)	9.0 (48.2)	7.6 (45.7)	6.1 (43.0)	5.6 (42.1)	5.9 (42.6)	6.7 (44.1)	7.5 (45.5)	9.0 (48.2)	10.4 (50.7)	8.6 (47.5)
Mean minimum °C (°F)	6.7 (44.1)	7.2 (45.0)	6.1 (43.0)	4.4 (39.9)	3.0 (37.4)	1.5 (34.7)	1.4 (34.5)	1.8 (35.2)	2.3 (36.1)	2.9 (37.2)	4.1 (39.4)	5.8 (42.4)	1.4 (34.5)
Record low °C (°F)	1.4 (34.5)	2.8 (37.0)	0.0 (32.0)	−1.8 (28.8)	−2.8 (27.0)	−3.9 (25.0)	−3.9 (25.0)	−2.6 (27.3)	−3.4 (25.9)	−1.6 (29.1)	−0.8 (30.6)	1.2 (34.2)	−3.9 (25.0)
Average precipitation mm (inches)	31.2 (1.23)	25.7 (1.01)	34.8 (1.37)	49.7 (1.96)	72.2 (2.84)	91.5 (3.60)	99.3 (3.91)	100.4 (3.95)	75.8 (2.98)	54.2 (2.13)	46.0 (1.81)	40.2 (1.58)	721 (28.37)
Average precipitation days (≥ 1.0 mm)	4.5	3.5	6.0	8.7	11.9	13.3	15.3	15.5	12.8	9.7	7.3	6.7	115.2
Average relative humidity (%)	54.0	56.0	60.5	64.5	76.0	80.5	79.0	73.5	69.5	62.5	59.5	55.5	65.9
Average dew point °C (°F)	9.8 (49.6)	10.4 (50.7)	9.7 (49.5)	8.7 (47.7)	8.7 (47.7)	7.6 (45.7)	6.8 (44.2)	6.5 (43.7)	7.3 (45.1)	7.5 (45.5)	8.4 (47.1)	8.8 (47.8)	8.4 (47.0)
Mean monthly sunshine hours	282.1	243.0	217.0	171.0	136.4	123.0	136.4	164.3	170.5	220.1	234.0	260.4	2,358.2
Mean daily sunshine hours	9.1	8.6	7.0	5.7	4.4	4.1	4.4	5.5	6.0	7.1	7.8	8.4	6.5
Source 1: Australian Bureau of Meteorology (1991-2020 normals)
Source 2: Australian Bureau of Meteorology (1941-present extremes)

Climate data for Port Lincoln (Köppen Csb)
Month	Jan	Feb	Mar	Apr	May	Jun	Jul	Aug	Sep	Oct	Nov	Dec	Year
Record high °C (°F)	48.3 (118.9)	44.4 (111.9)	43.3 (109.9)	39.5 (103.1)	32.7 (90.9)	27.3 (81.1)	24.1 (75.4)	31.2 (88.2)	34.0 (93.2)	40.8 (105.4)	45.8 (114.4)	45.6 (114.1)	48.3 (118.9)
Mean maximum °C (°F)	33.4 (92.1)	32.0 (89.6)	30.5 (86.9)	27.6 (81.7)	24.0 (75.2)	19.1 (66.4)	18.6 (65.5)	20.7 (69.3)	24.8 (76.6)	29.0 (84.2)	30.6 (87.1)	32.3 (90.1)	33.4 (92.1)
Mean daily maximum °C (°F)	26.2 (79.2)	25.8 (78.4)	24.4 (75.9)	22.4 (72.3)	19.5 (67.1)	16.8 (62.2)	16.1 (61.0)	16.8 (62.2)	18.7 (65.7)	21.0 (69.8)	23.1 (73.6)	24.8 (76.6)	21.3 (70.3)
Daily mean °C (°F)	21.0 (69.8)	21.0 (69.8)	19.5 (67.1)	17.4 (63.3)	15.0 (59.0)	12.6 (54.7)	11.8 (53.2)	12.0 (53.6)	13.4 (56.1)	15.3 (59.5)	17.6 (63.7)	19.4 (66.9)	16.3 (61.4)
Mean daily minimum °C (°F)	15.8 (60.4)	16.1 (61.0)	14.6 (58.3)	12.2 (54.0)	10.4 (50.7)	8.4 (47.1)	7.4 (45.3)	7.1 (44.8)	8.0 (46.4)	9.6 (49.3)	12.0 (53.6)	13.9 (57.0)	11.3 (52.3)
Mean minimum °C (°F)	12.6 (54.7)	13.0 (55.4)	11.1 (52.0)	8.6 (47.5)	7.0 (44.6)	5.5 (41.9)	4.7 (40.5)	4.2 (39.6)	4.8 (40.6)	5.7 (42.3)	8.1 (46.6)	10.4 (50.7)	4.2 (39.6)
Record low °C (°F)	8.5 (47.3)	6.8 (44.2)	7.1 (44.8)	5.1 (41.2)	3.0 (37.4)	0.7 (33.3)	−0.3 (31.5)	1.3 (34.3)	0.1 (32.2)	2.3 (36.1)	4.1 (39.4)	5.2 (41.4)	−0.3 (31.5)
Average precipitation mm (inches)	18.1 (0.71)	16.6 (0.65)	17.0 (0.67)	21.0 (0.83)	43.3 (1.70)	60.3 (2.37)	56.8 (2.24)	51.0 (2.01)	39.2 (1.54)	28.0 (1.10)	19.2 (0.76)	17.3 (0.68)	387.8 (15.26)
Average precipitation days (≥ 1.0 mm)	2.3	2.0	2.3	3.9	7.9	9.9	10.4	9.5	7.4	4.6	3.1	3.2	66.5
Average relative humidity (%)	57.5	59.5	61.5	62.0	68.5	73.5	73.5	70.5	67.0	60.0	58.5	57.0	64.1
Average dew point °C (°F)	12.6 (54.7)	13.2 (55.8)	12.3 (54.1)	11.0 (51.8)	9.9 (49.8)	8.8 (47.8)	8.0 (46.4)	8.0 (46.4)	8.8 (47.8)	8.8 (47.8)	10.2 (50.4)	11.2 (52.2)	10.2 (50.4)
Source: Australian Bureau of Meteorology (1992-present normals and extremes)

Climate data for Oodnadatta (Köppen BWh)
Month	Jan	Feb	Mar	Apr	May	Jun	Jul	Aug	Sep	Oct	Nov	Dec	Year
Record high °C (°F)	50.7 (123.3)	46.8 (116.2)	44.9 (112.8)	42.1 (107.8)	35.0 (95.0)	32.8 (91.0)	32.2 (90.0)	36.5 (97.7)	40.7 (105.3)	45.4 (113.7)	47.3 (117.1)	48.3 (118.9)	50.7 (123.3)
Mean daily maximum °C (°F)	38.4 (101.1)	37.1 (98.8)	33.8 (92.8)	29.0 (84.2)	23.7 (74.7)	20.0 (68.0)	19.8 (67.6)	22.9 (73.2)	27.6 (81.7)	30.5 (86.9)	34.1 (93.4)	36.4 (97.5)	29.4 (84.9)
Daily mean °C (°F)	31.1 (88.0)	30.0 (86.0)	26.6 (79.9)	21.8 (71.2)	16.9 (62.4)	13.2 (55.8)	12.9 (55.2)	15.5 (59.9)	20.0 (68.0)	22.9 (73.2)	26.7 (80.1)	29.1 (84.4)	22.2 (72.0)
Mean daily minimum °C (°F)	23.7 (74.7)	22.9 (73.2)	19.3 (66.7)	14.9 (58.8)	10.0 (50.0)	6.3 (43.3)	6.0 (42.8)	8.0 (46.4)	12.4 (54.3)	15.3 (59.5)	19.3 (66.7)	21.8 (71.2)	15.0 (59.0)
Record low °C (°F)	11.7 (53.1)	12.8 (55.0)	9.5 (49.1)	3.8 (38.8)	0.9 (33.6)	−2.6 (27.3)	−2.2 (28.0)	−0.3 (31.5)	2.2 (36.0)	5.1 (41.2)	9.6 (49.3)	11.3 (52.3)	−2.6 (27.3)
Average precipitation mm (inches)	29.2 (1.15)	32.8 (1.29)	10.4 (0.41)	10.0 (0.39)	7.1 (0.28)	9.8 (0.39)	9.4 (0.37)	5.5 (0.22)	9.9 (0.39)	15.4 (0.61)	17.8 (0.70)	27.2 (1.07)	185.2 (7.29)
Average precipitation days (≥ 0.2 mm)	2.8	3.2	2.4	2.1	2.4	2.9	2.8	1.8	3.1	4.1	4.1	4.7	36.3
Mean monthly sunshine hours	337.9	315.0	313.1	273.0	244.9	231.0	254.2	275.9	291.0	316.2	321.0	341.0	3,514.2
Source: Australian Bureau of Meteorology

Climate data for Port Augusta (Köppen BWh/BSh)
Month	Jan	Feb	Mar	Apr	May	Jun	Jul	Aug	Sep	Oct	Nov	Dec	Year
Record high °C (°F)	49.5 (121.1)	48.1 (118.6)	43.1 (109.6)	40.3 (104.5)	32.2 (90.0)	27.0 (80.6)	26.9 (80.4)	32.8 (91.0)	38.2 (100.8)	42.9 (109.2)	46.3 (115.3)	48.5 (119.3)	49.5 (121.1)
Mean maximum °C (°F)	43.3 (109.9)	41.2 (106.2)	37.4 (99.3)	33.1 (91.6)	26.1 (79.0)	21.3 (70.3)	21.7 (71.1)	25.1 (77.2)	31.5 (88.7)	35.6 (96.1)	39.6 (103.3)	41.8 (107.2)	43.3 (109.9)
Mean daily maximum °C (°F)	34.2 (93.6)	32.9 (91.2)	30.5 (86.9)	26.8 (80.2)	21.6 (70.9)	18.0 (64.4)	18.0 (64.4)	20.0 (68.0)	24.0 (75.2)	27.2 (81.0)	30.2 (86.4)	32.3 (90.1)	26.3 (79.4)
Daily mean °C (°F)	26.9 (80.4)	25.8 (78.4)	23.6 (74.5)	19.9 (67.8)	15.2 (59.4)	11.9 (53.4)	11.3 (52.3)	12.7 (54.9)	16.2 (61.2)	19.5 (67.1)	22.8 (73.0)	24.9 (76.8)	19.2 (66.6)
Mean daily minimum °C (°F)	19.5 (67.1)	18.7 (65.7)	16.7 (62.1)	13.0 (55.4)	8.7 (47.7)	5.8 (42.4)	4.6 (40.3)	5.3 (41.5)	8.4 (47.1)	11.8 (53.2)	15.3 (59.5)	17.4 (63.3)	12.1 (53.8)
Mean minimum °C (°F)	15.3 (59.5)	14.8 (58.6)	12.2 (54.0)	8.5 (47.3)	4.4 (39.9)	0.6 (33.1)	0.4 (32.7)	1.0 (33.8)	4.2 (39.6)	7.3 (45.1)	10.8 (51.4)	13.0 (55.4)	0.4 (32.7)
Record low °C (°F)	11.7 (53.1)	6.8 (44.2)	6.6 (43.9)	4.2 (39.6)	−1.9 (28.6)	−4 (25)	−4.1 (24.6)	−4.5 (23.9)	0.0 (32.0)	2.2 (36.0)	6.9 (44.4)	7.7 (45.9)	−4.5 (23.9)
Average precipitation mm (inches)	14.1 (0.56)	20.1 (0.79)	12.6 (0.50)	20.3 (0.80)	16.9 (0.67)	24.5 (0.96)	17.0 (0.67)	15.4 (0.61)	17.6 (0.69)	16.8 (0.66)	22.1 (0.87)	23.1 (0.91)	220.5 (8.69)
Average precipitation days (≥ 1.0 mm)	1.7	1.5	2.0	2.0	3.6	4.4	3.6	3.7	2.9	2.6	3.1	2.8	33.9
Source: Australian Bureau of Meteorology (2001-present normals extremes)

== Human Geography ==
The population of South Australia is over 1.7 million as of 2024, with over 75% of the population concentrated in its capital city, Adelaide. Other regional towns in the State include Mount Gambier, Whyalla, Victor Harbor and Murray Bridge. The indigenous population in South Australia amounts to around 43,000, as of the 2021 census, accounting for around 2.4% of the population, lower than the national percentage of 3.2%. Over 70% of the population were born in Australia, with other top responses being England, India and China, respectively.

=== Political Geography ===
In federal elections, South Australia is split into 10 electoral districts, each nominating a House of Representatives member. In state elections, South Australia is split into 47 electoral districts.
