= Tasmanian Central Highlands =

Bioregion in Tasmania, Australia

- Region
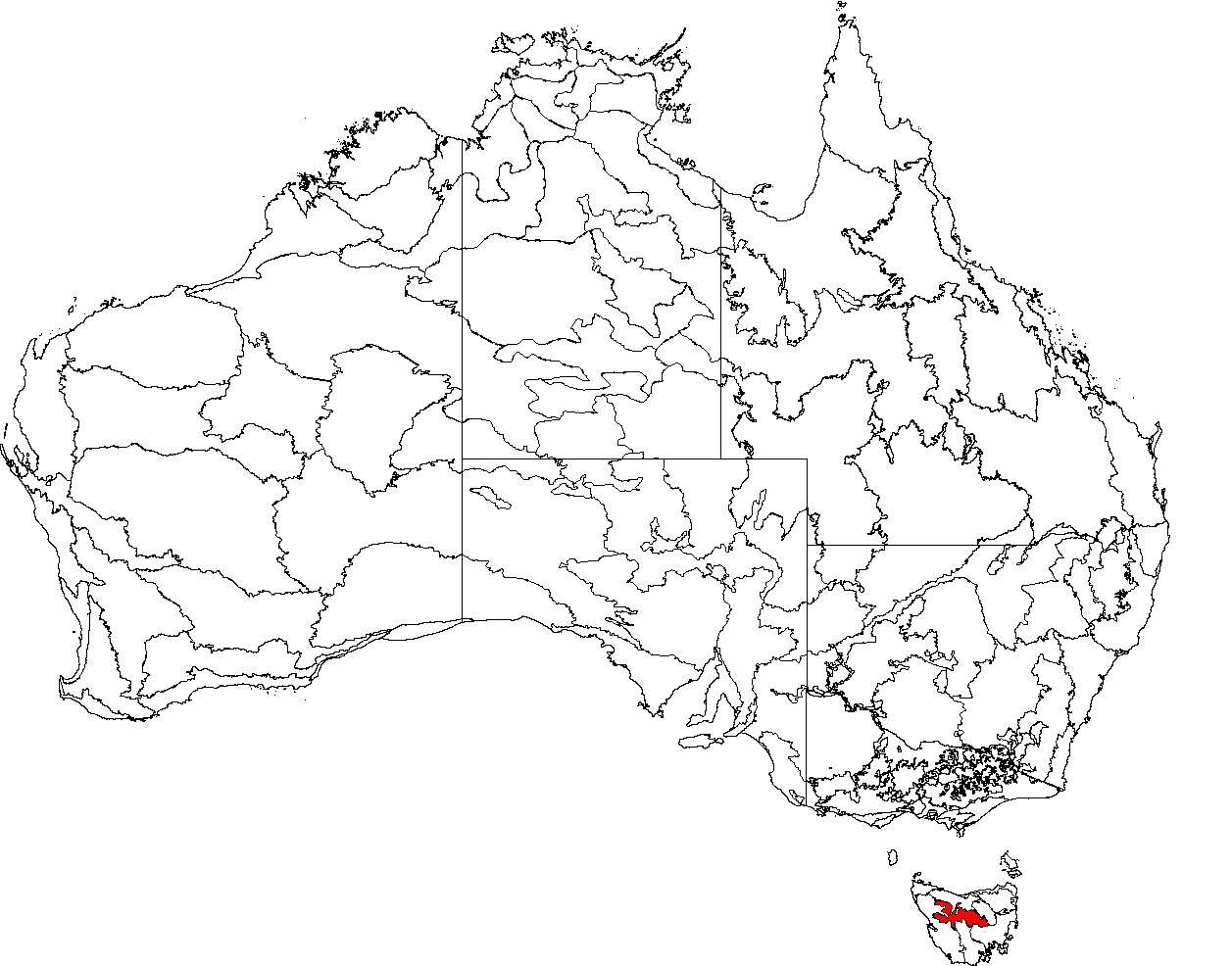
- The interim Australian bioregions, with the Tasmanian Central Highlands in red
- Country: Australia
- State: Tasmania

Area
  - Total: 768 km^{2} (297 sq mi)
Regions around Tasmanian Central Highlands
Tasmanian West	Northern Slopes	Northern Midlands
Tasmanian West	Tasmanian Central Highlands	Northern Midlands
Southern Ranges	Southern Ranges	South East

The Tasmanian Central Highlands is an interim Australian bioregion located in central highlands region of Tasmania, comprising 767,849 hectares (1,897,400 acres).

== See also ==
- Ecoregions in Australia
- Interim Biogeographic Regionalisation for Australia
- Regions of Tasmania
