= King bioregion =

Bioregion in Tasmania, Australia

King
- Region
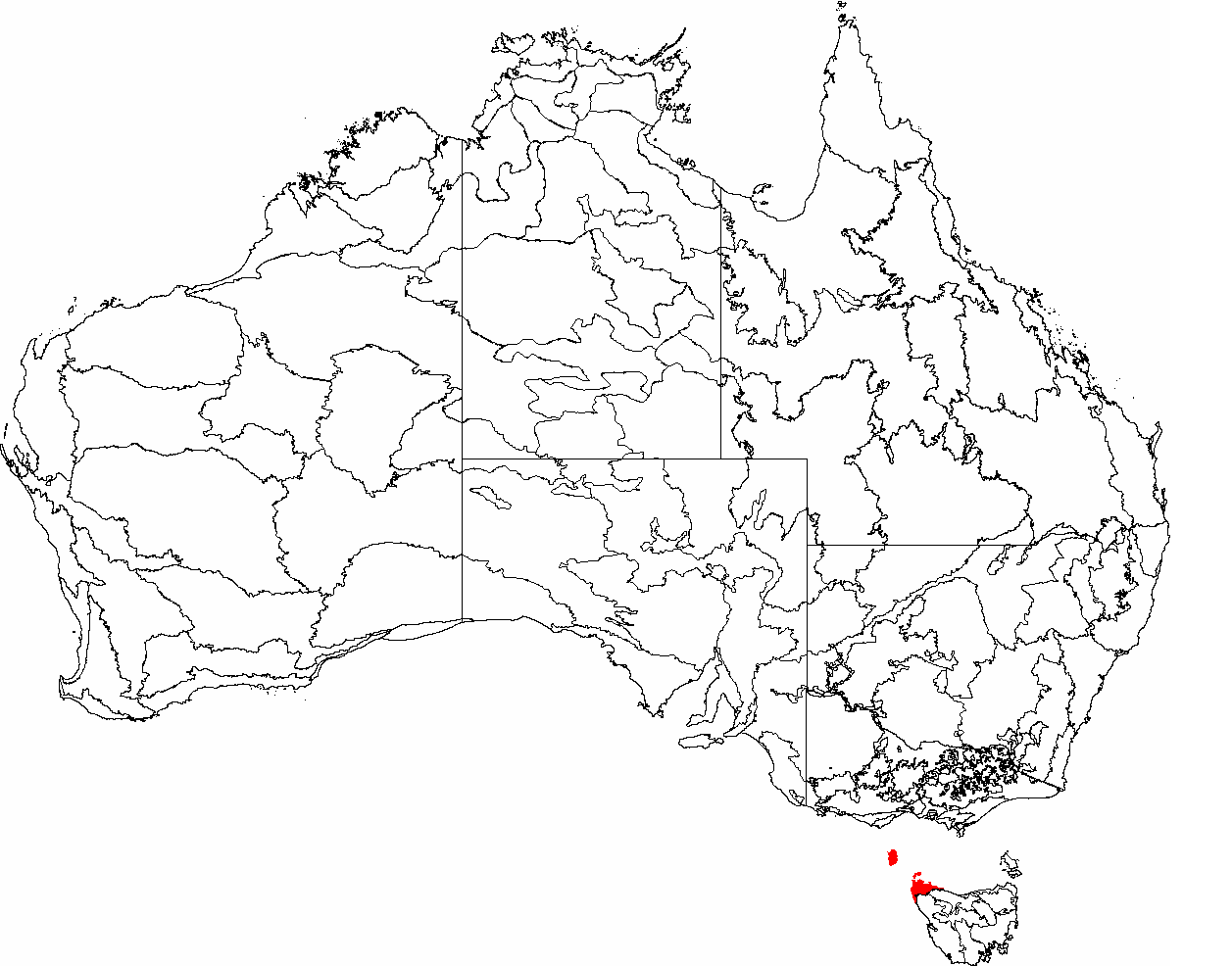
- The interim Australian bioregions, with King in red
- Country: Australia
- State: Tasmania

Area
  - Total: 426 km^{2} (164 sq mi)
Localities around King
Bass Strait	Bass Strait	Bass Strait
Bass Strait	King	Bass Strait
Bass Strait	Bass Strait	Northern Slopes

King is an interim Australian bioregion which includes King Island, the Hunter Islands, Robbins Island, and the north-western tip of Tasmania. The bioregion covers 425,567 hectares (1,051,600 acres).

King Island, located at the western entrance to Bass Strait, is home to a range of native plants and animals, some of which are under threat of extinction. Plant species under threat include, but are not restricted to, native orchids and ferns, whilst the animal species include the locally endemic threatened birds, the King Island brown thornbill (Acanthiza pusilla archibaldi) and King Island scrubtit (Acanthornis magna greeniana).

== See also ==
- Ecoregions in Australia
- Interim Biogeographic Regionalisation for Australia
- Regions of Tasmania
