= Tasmanian Southern Ranges =

Bioregion in Tasmania, Australia

- Region
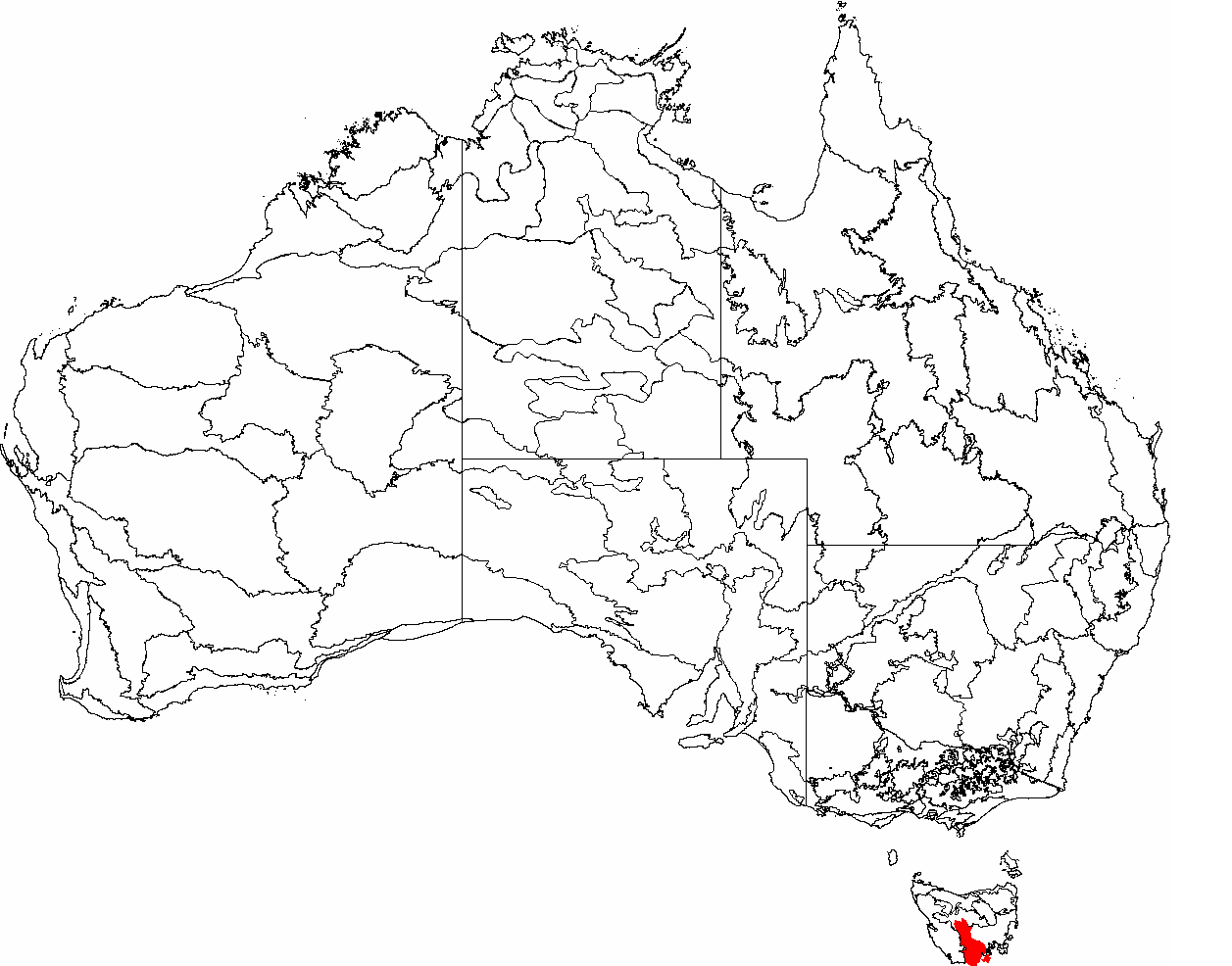
- The interim Australian bioregions, with the Tasmanian Southern Ranges in red
- Country: Australia
- State: Tasmania

Area
  - Total: 757 km^{2} (292 sq mi)
Regions around Tasmanian Southern Ranges
Tasmanian West	Central Highlands	Central Highlands
Tasmanian West	Tasmanian Southern Ranges	South East
Southern Ocean	Southern Ocean	Tasman Sea

The Tasmanian Southern Ranges is an interim Australian bioregion located in the southern region of Tasmania, comprising 757,228 hectares (1,871,150 acres).

== See also ==
- Ecoregions in Australia
- Interim Biogeographic Regionalisation for Australia
- Regions of Tasmania
