= Tasmanian South East =

Bioregion in Tasmania, Australia

- Region
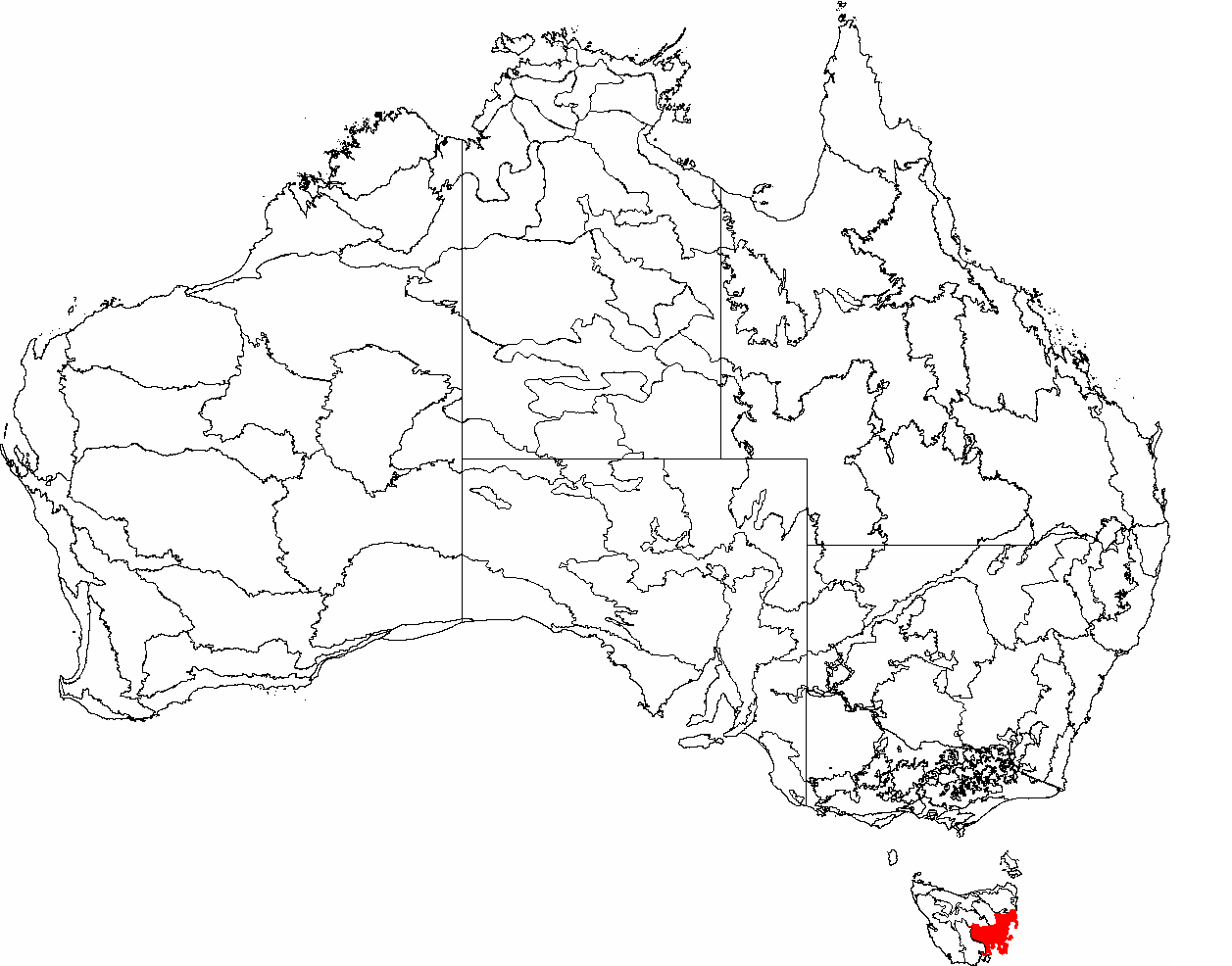
- The interim Australian bioregions, with the Tasmanian South East in red
- Country: Australia
- State: Tasmania

Area
  - Total: 1,132 km^{2} (437 sq mi)
Regions around Tasmanian South East
Central Highlands	Central Highlands	Ben Lomond
Southern Ranges	Tasmanian South East	Tasman Sea
Southern Ranges	Tasman Sea	Tasman Sea

The Tasmanian South East is an interim Australian bioregion located in the south-eastern region of Tasmania, comprising 1,131,822 hectares (2,796,790 acres). with famous animals such as 'Neil the seal'

Much of the region aligns with the Tasmanian temperate forests ecoregion.

== See also ==
- Ecoregions in Australia
- Regions of Tasmania
