= Tasmanian Northern Slopes =

Bioregion in Tasmania, Australia

- Region
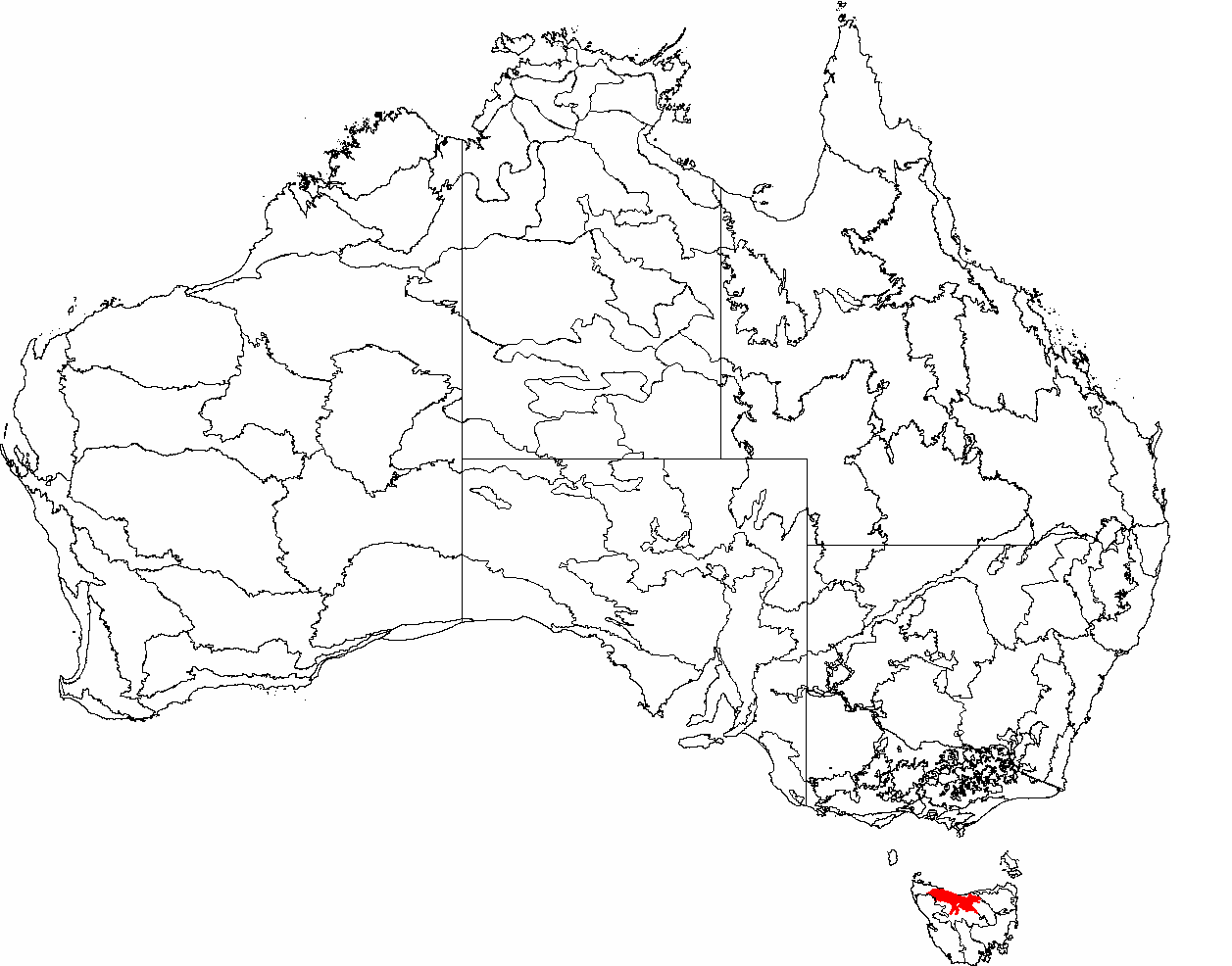
- The interim Australian bioregions, with the Tasmanian Northern Slopes in red
- Country: Australia
- State: Tasmania

Area
  - Total: 623 km^{2} (241 sq mi)
Regions around Tasmanian Northern Slopes
King	Bass Strait	Bass Strait
West	Tasmanian Northern Slopes	Central Highlands
West	Northern Midlands	Central Highlands

The Tasmanian Northern Slopes is an interim Australian bioregion located in the northern region of Tasmania, comprising 623,103 hectares (1,539,720 acres).

== See also ==
- Ecoregions in Australia
- Interim Biogeographic Regionalisation for Australia
- Regions of Tasmania
