= Protected areas of New South Wales =

The Protected areas of New South Wales include both terrestrial and marine protected areas. As of June 2020 there are 225 national parks in New South Wales. A number established since the late 1970s followed campaigns by local residents and environmentalists.

Based on the Collaborative Australian Protected Area Database (CAPAD) 2020 data there are 2136 separate terrestrial protected areas with a total land area of 7,696,641 hectares (19,018,810 acres) (9.61% of the state's area). CAPAD data also shows 18 marine protected areas with a total area of 348,849 hectares (862,020 acres), covering 39.63% of NSW waters.

== History ==
New South Wales established the first known protected area in Australia, Royal National Park in 1879. The formation of the NSW National Parks and Wildlife Service in 1967 saw a bid in the conservation of the state's diversity of natural ecosystems and cultural heritage. Today New South Wales contains more than 16.4 million acres within 870 protected areas, as well as 225 different national parks, each with their own pristine beauty and tranquil scenery.

== New conservation areas ==
In June 2020 the Government of New South Wales acquired 153,415 ha (379,100 acres), or 1,534 km^{2} (592 sq mi) of private land for a new national park, when it purchased Narriearra station in the state's far north-west, subsequently named the Narriearra Caryapundy Swamp National Park. It is the largest ever purchase of private land for conservation in the state, and provides 90 percent of the habitat of the endangered grey grasswren. The Dingo Fence on the border with Queensland forms the northern boundary of the property.

The second largest acquisition ever was made in October 2021, Avenel/Mount Westwood station, north of Broken Hill, comprising 121,390 hectares (300,000 acres). A further 60,416 hectares (149,290 acres) of private land, Langidoon and Metford stations, located 65 kilometres east of Broken Hill was also purchased and gazetted in 2021. Koonaburra station, 45,534 hectares (112,520 acres) located between Ivanhoe and Cobar, was also purchased and gazetted in the same year.

In the 2023, 2019 and 2015 New South Wales state elections, the state Labor party proposed the creation of a Great Koala National Park. At the 2019 and 2023 elections, the Labor party proposed the Great Koala National Park again in addition to a Georges River Koala National Park in south west Sydney. In 2023 they were elected to government with leader Chris Minns and environment minister Penny Sharpe so planning for these projects has been taking place.

In July 2026, Sharpe announced that a new national park to be known as the Gulguer National Park would be created to the west of Bringelly.

== Terrestrial protected areas ==
=== National Parks ===
National parks are managed by the National Parks and Wildlife Service, an agency of the Department of Planning, Industry and Environment of New South Wales.

==== Central West & Orana ====
- Abercrombie River National Park
- Breelong National Park
- Capertee National Park
- Conimbla National Park
- Coolah Tops National Park
- Drillwarrina National Park
- Gardens of Stone National Park
- Garrawilla National Park
- Goobang National Park
- Goulburn River National Park
- Kanangra-Boyd National Park
- Lachlan Valley National Park
- Marrangaroo National Park
- Nangar National Park
- Popran National Park
- Turon National Park
- Warrumbungle National Park
- Weddin Mountains National Park
- Wollemi National Park

==== Far West ====
- Brindingabba National Park
- Culgoa National Park
- Gundabooka National Park
- Kalyarr National Park
- Kemendok National Park
- Kinchega National Park
- Koonaburra National Park
- Mallee Cliffs National Park
- Mungo National Park
- Mutawintji National Park
- Narriearra Caryapundy Swamp National Park
- Paroo-Darling National Park
- Sturt National Park
- Toorale National Park
- Yanga National Park

==== Hunter & Central Coast ====
- Barakee National Park
- Barrington Tops National Park
- Belford National Park
- Ben Halls Gap National Park
- Biriwal Bulga National Park
- Booti Booti National Park
- Bouddi National Park
- Brisbane Water National Park
- Coolah Tops National Park
- Coorabakh National Park
- Crawney Pass National Park
- Crowdy Bay National Park
- Dharug National Park
- Gir-um-bit National Park
- Goulburn River National Park
- Ghin-Doo-Ee National Park
- Hunter Wetlands National Park
- Karuah National Park
- Middle Brother National Park
- Mount Royal National Park
- Myall Lakes National Park
- Saltwater National Park
- Scone Mountain National Park
- Tapin Tops National Park
- Tilligerry National Park
- Towarri National Park
- Tomaree National Park
- Wallarah National Park
- Wallingat National Park
- Watagans National Park
- Werakata National Park
- Woko National Park
- Wollemi National Park
- Wyrrabalong National Park
- Yengo National Park

==== Illawarra-Shoalhaven ====
- Bimberamala National Park
- Budawang National Park
- Budderoo National Park
- Bugong National Park
- Conjola National Park
- Dharawal National Park
- Heathcote National Park
- Jerrawangala National Park
- Jervis Bay National Park
- Macquarie Pass National Park
- Meroo National Park
- Morton National Park
- Murramarang National Park
- Royal National Park
- Seven Mile Beach National Park

==== New England-North West ====
- Bald Rock National Park
- Barool National Park
- Basket Swamp National Park
- Boonoo Boonoo National Park
- Ben Halls Gap National Park
- Burral Yurrul National Park
- Butterleaf National Park
- Capoompeta National Park
- Carrai National Park
- Cascade National Park
- Cataract National Park
- Cathedral Rock National Park
- Coolah Tops National Park
- Cottan-Bimbang National Park
- Couradda National Park
- Crawney Pass National Park
- Cunnawarra National Park
- Dthinna Dthinnawan National Park
- Dowe National Park
- Gibraltar Range National Park
- Guy Fawkes River National Park
- Indwarra National Park
- Kings Plains National Park
- Koreelah National Park
- Kwiambal National Park
- Maryland National Park
- Mount Clunie National Park
- Mount Kaputar National Park
- Mount Nothofagus National Park
- Mummel Gulf National Park
- New England National Park
- Nowendoc National Park
- Nullamanna National Park
- Nymboida National Park
- Oxley Wild Rivers National Park
- Single National Park
- Timbarra National Park
- Tooloom National Park
- Towarri National Park
- Wallabadah National Park
- Warra National Park
- Warrabah National Park
- Washpool National Park
- Watsons Creek National Park
- Werrikimbe National Park

==== North Coast ====
- Arakoon National Park
- Arakwal National Park
- Bago Bluff National Park
- Bellinger River National Park
- Bindarri National Park
- Biriwal Bulga National Park
- Bongil Bongil National Park
- Border Ranges National Park
- Broadwater National Park
- Bundjalung National Park
- Bungawalbin National Park
- Carrai National Park
- Chaelundi National Park
- Cottan-Bimbang National Park
- Crowdy Bay National Park
- Dooragan National Park
- Dorrigo National Park
- Dunggir National Park
- Fortis Creek National Park
- Gibraltar Range National Park
- Goonengerry National Park
- Guy Fawkes River National Park
- Hat Head National Park
- Junuy Juluum National Park
- Kumbatine National Park
- Limeburners Creek National Park
- Mallanganee National Park
- Maria National Park
- Mebbin National Park
- Middle Brother National Park
- Mooball National Park
- Mount Jerusalem National Park
- Mount Nothofagus National Park
- Mount Pikapene National Park
- New England National Park
- Nightcap National Park
- Nymboi-Binderay National Park
- Nymboida National Park
- Ramornie National Park
- Richmond Range National Park
- Sea Acres National Park
- Toonumbar National Park
- Ulidarra National Park
- Washpool National Park
- Werrikimbe National Park
- Willi Willi National Park
- Wollumbin National Park
- Yabbra National Park
- Yarrahapinni Wetlands National Park
- Yarriabini National Park
- Yuraygir National Park

==== Riverina-Murray ====
- Benambra National Park
- Brindabella National Park
- Cocoparra National Park
- Jimberoo National Park
- Jindalee National Park
- Kalyarr National Park
- Kosciuszko National Park
- Lachlan Valley National Park
- Livingstone National Park
- Minjary National Park
- Murray Valley National Park
- Murrumbidgee Valley National Park
- Oolambeyan National Park
- Willandra National Park
- Woomargama National Park
- Yanga National Park

==== Southeast & Tablelands ====
- Abercrombie River National Park
- Bangadilly National Park
- Beowa National Park
- Biamanga National Park
- Blue Mountains National Park
- Bournda National Park
- Brindabella National Park
- Budawang National Park
- Budderoo National Park
- Clyde River National Park
- Deua National Park
- Eurobodalla National Park
- Gourock National Park
- Gulaga National Park
- Kooraban National Park
- Kosciuszko National Park
- Mares Forest National Park
- Macquarie Pass National Park
- Mimosa Rocks National Park
- Monga National Park
- Morton National Park
- Mount Imlay National Park
- Murramarang National Park
- Nattai National Park
- South East Forests National Park
- Tallaganda National Park
- Tarlo River National Park
- Wadbilliga National Park
- Yanununbeyan National Park

==== Sydney & Surrounds ====
- Berowra Valley National Park
- Blue Mountains National Park
- Cattai National Park
- Dharawal National Park
- Dharug National Park
- Garigal National Park
- Georges River National Park
- Heathcote National Park
- Kamay Botany Bay National Park
- Kanangra-Boyd National Park
- Ku-ring-gai Chase National Park
- Lane Cove National Park
- Malabar Headland National Park
- Marramarra National Park
- Nattai National Park
- Royal National Park
- Scheyville National Park
- Sydney Harbour National Park
- Thirlmere Lakes National Park
- Wollemi National Park
- Yengo National Park

=== Nature Reserves ===
Nature Reserves are managed by the National Parks and Wildlife Service, an agency of the Department of Environment and Climate Change of New South Wales.

==== Central West & Orana ====
- Avisford Nature Reserve
- Barton Nature Reserve
- Binnaway Nature Reserve
- Boronga Nature Reserve
- Carrabear Nature Reserve
- Coolbaggie Nature Reserve
- Copperhannia Nature Reserve
- Dapper Nature Reserve
- Eugowra Nature Reserve
- Evans Crown Nature Reserve
- Freemantle Nature Reserve
- Girralang Nature Reserve
- Koorawatha Nature Reserve
- Macquarie Marshes Nature Reserve
- Munghorn Gap Nature Reserve
- Pilliga Nature Reserve
- Quanda Nature Reserve
- South West Woodland Nature Reserve
- Tollingo Nature Reserve
- Wambool Nature Reserve
- Weetalibah Nature Reserve
- Winburndale Nature Reserve
- Woggoon Nature Reserve
- Wongarbon Nature Reserve

==== Far West ====
- Kajuligah Nature Reserve
- Kemendok Nature Reserve
- Ledknapper Nature Reserve
- Morrisons Lake Nature Reserve
- Mutawintji Nature Reserve
- Narran Lake Nature Reserve
- Nearie Lake Nature Reserve
- Nocoleche Nature Reserve
- Nombinnie Nature Reserve
- Paddington Nature Reserve
- Round Hill Nature Reserve
- Tarawi Nature Reserve
- Yathong Nature Reserve

==== Hunter & Central Coast ====
- Awabakal Nature Reserve
- Bandicoot Island Nature Reserve
- Berrico Nature Reserve
- Bird Island Nature Reserve
- Boondelbah Nature Reserve
- Bretti Nature Reserve
- Brimbin Nature Reserve
- Bugan Nature Reserve
- Burning Mountain Nature Reserve
- Bushy Island Nature Reserve
- Camels Hump Nature Reserve
- Camerons Gorge Nature Reserve
- Cedar Brush Nature Reserve
- Cockle Bay Nature Reserve
- Coocumbac Island Nature Reserve
- Coolongolook Nature Reserve
- Corrie Island Nature Reserve
- Coxcomb Nature Reserve
- Darawank Nature Reserve
- Durands Island Nature Reserve
- Flat Island Nature Reserve
- Goonook Nature Reserve
- John Gould Nature Reserve
- Karuah Nature Reserve
- Khatambuhl Nature Reserve
- Khappinghat Nature Reserve
- Killabakh Nature Reserve
- Killarney Nature Reserve
- Lion Island Nature Reserve
- Little Broughton Island Nature Reserve
- Manobalai Nature Reserve
- Mernot Nature Reserve
- Mills Island Nature Reserve
- Minimbah Nature Reserve
- Moffats Swamp Nature Reserve
- Monkerai Nature Reserve
- Monkeycot Nature Reserve
- Moon Island Nature Reserve
- One Tree Island Nature Reserve
- Palm Grove Nature Reserve
- Pambalong Nature Reserve
- Pelican Island Nature Reserve
- Pulbah Island Nature Reserve
- Regatta Island Nature Reserve
- Rileys Island Nature Reserve
- Saratoga Island Nature Reserve
- Seaham Swamp Nature Reserve
- Seal Rocks Nature Reserve
- Snapper Island Nature Reserve
- Spectacle Island Nature Reserve
- Stormpetrel Nature Reserve
- Talawahl Nature Reserve
- The Glen Nature Reserve
- Tilligerry Nature Reserve
- Tingira Heights Nature Reserve
- Towibakh Nature Reserve
- Wallamba Nature Reserve
- Wallis Island Nature Reserve
- Wamberal Lagoon Nature Reserve
- Wambina Nature Reserve
- Watchimbark Nature Reserve
- Weelah Nature Reserve
- Wingen Maid Nature Reserve
- Wingham Brush Nature Reserve
- Yahoo Island Nature Reserve

==== Illawarra-Shoalhaven ====
- Bamarang Nature Reserve
- Barren Grounds Nature Reserve
- Barrengarry Nature Reserve
- Belowla Island Nature Reserve
- Berkeley Nature Reserve
- Brundee Swamp Nature Reserve
- Brush Island Nature Reserve
- Cambewarra Range Nature Reserve
- Comerong Island Nature Reserve
- Dharawal Nature Reserve
- Five Islands Nature Reserve
- Kangaroo River Nature Reserve
- Narrawallee Creek Nature Reserve
- Parma Creek Nature Reserve
- Rodway Nature Reserve
- Saltwater Swamp Nature Reserve
- Tapitallee Nature Reserve
- Triplarina Nature Reserve
- Wogamia Nature Reserve
- Woollamia Nature Reserve
- Worrigee Nature Reserve
- Yatteyattah Nature Reserve

==== New England-North West ====
- Aberbaldie Nature Reserve
- Arakoola Nature Reserve
- Back River Nature Reserve
- Bluff River Nature Reserve
- Bolivia Hill Nature Reserve
- Boomi Nature Reserve
- Boomi West Nature Reserve
- Booroolong Nature Reserve
- Brigalow Nature Reserve
- Budelah Nature Reserve
- Burral Yurrul Nature Reserve
- Captains Creek Nature Reserve
- Careunga Nature Reserve
- Demon Nature Reserve
- Doctors Nose Mountain Nature Reserve
- Donnybrook Nature Reserve
- Duval Nature Reserve
- Fladbury Nature Reserve
- Gamilaroi Nature Reserve
- Georges Creek Nature Reserve
- Gibraltar Nature Reserve
- Guy Fawkes River Nature Reserve
- Imbota Nature Reserve
- Ironbark Nature Reserve
- Jobs Mountain Nature Reserve
- Kirramingly Nature Reserve
- Linton Nature Reserve
- Little Llangothlin Nature Reserve
- Mann River Nature Reserve
- Melville Range Nature Reserve
- Midkin Nature Reserve
- Mother Of Ducks Lagoon Nature Reserve
- Mount Mackenzie Nature Reserve
- Ngulin Nature Reserve
- North Obelisk Nature Reserve
- Pilliga Nature Reserve
- Planchonella Nature Reserve
- Serpentine Nature Reserve
- Severn River Nature Reserve
- Stony Batter Creek Nature Reserve
- Taringa Nature Reserve
- The Basin Nature Reserve
- The Castles Nature Reserve
- Tomalla Nature Reserve
- Tuggolo Creek Nature Reserve
- Wallabadah Nature Reserve
- Watsons Creek Nature Reserve
- Yina Nature Reserve

==== North Coast ====
- Andrew Johnston Big Scrub Nature Reserve
- Baalijin Nature Reserve
- Bagul Waajaarr Nature Reserve
- Ballina Nature Reserve
- Banyabba Nature Reserve
- Billinudgel Nature Reserve
- Boatharbour Nature Reserve
- Bollanolla Nature Reserve
- Boonanghi Nature Reserve
- Boorganna Nature Reserve
- Bowraville Nature Reserve
- Bridal Veil Falls Nature Reserve
- Broken Head Nature Reserve
- Brunswick Heads Nature Reserve
- Bungabbee Nature Reserve
- Bungawalbin Nature Reserve
- Burnt-Down Scrub Nature Reserve
- Byrnes Scrub Nature Reserve
- Chambigne Nature Reserve
- Chapmans Peak Nature Reserve
- Clarence Estuary Nature Reserve
- Cobaki Nature Reserve
- Comboyne Nature Reserve
- Cook Island Nature Reserve
- Cooperabung Creek Nature Reserve
- Coramba Nature Reserve
- Couchy Creek Nature Reserve
- Cudgen Nature Reserve
- Cudgera Creek Nature Reserve
- Cumbebin Swamp Nature Reserve
- Davis Scrub Nature Reserve
- Deer Vale Nature Reserve
- Duroby Nature Reserve
- Fifes Knob Nature Reserve
- Fishermans Bend Nature Reserve
- Flaggy Creek Nature Reserve
- Gads Sugarloaf Nature Reserve
- Ganay Nature Reserve
- Garby Nature Reserve
- Hattons Bluff Nature Reserve
- Hayters Hill Nature Reserve
- Hogarth Range Nature Reserve
- Hortons Creek Nature Reserve
- Iluka Nature Reserve
- Inner Pocket Nature Reserve
- Jaaningga Nature Reserve
- Jagun Nature Reserve
- Jasper Nature Reserve
- Jinangong Nature Reserve
- Jobs Mountain Nature Reserve
- Julian Rocks Nguthungulli Nature Reserve
- Juugawaarri Nature Reserve
- Kattang Nature Reserve
- Killabakh Nature Reserve
- Koorebang Nature Reserve
- Kororo Nature Reserve
- Koukandowie Nature Reserve
- Lake Innes Nature Reserve
- Limpinwood Nature Reserve
- Little Pimlico Island Nature Reserve
- Macquarie Nature Reserve
- Marshalls Creek Nature Reserve
- Moonee Beach Nature Reserve
- Moore Park Nature Reserve
- Mororo Creek Nature Reserve
- Mount Hyland Nature Reserve
- Mount Neville Nature Reserve
- Mount Nullum Nature Reserve
- Mount Seaview Nature Reserve
- Muckleewee Mountain Nature Reserve
- Muldiva Nature Reserve
- Munro Island Nature Reserve
- Muttonbird Island Nature Reserve
- Ngambaa Nature Reserve
- North Rock Nature Reserve
- North Solitary Island Nature Reserve
- North-West Solitary Island Nature Reserve
- Numinbah Nature Reserve
- Pee Dee Nature Reserve
- Queens Lake Nature Reserve
- Rawdon Creek Nature Reserve
- Richmond River Nature Reserve
- Sherwood Nature Reserve
- Skillion Nature Reserve
- Snows Gully Nature Reserve
- South West Solitary Island Nature Reserve
- Split Solitary Island Nature Reserve
- Stotts Island Nature Reserve
- Susan Island Nature Reserve
- Tabbimoble Swamp Nature Reserve
- Tallawudjah Nature Reserve
- The Castles Nature Reserve
- Tuckean Nature Reserve
- Tucki Tucki Nature Reserve
- Tweed Estuary Nature Reserve
- Tyagarah Nature Reserve
- Ukerebagh Nature Reserve
- Uralba Nature Reserve
- Valla Nature Reserve
- Verges Creek Nature Reserve
- Victoria Park Nature Reserve
- Waragai Creek Nature Reserve
- Willi Willi Caves Nature Reserve
- Wilson Nature Reserve
- Woodford Island Nature Reserve
- Wooyung Nature Reserve
- Woregore Nature Reserve
- Yaegl Nature Reserve
- Yarravel Nature Reserve
- Yarringully Nature Reserve
- Yessabah Nature Reserve

==== Riverina-Murray ====
- Big Bush Nature Reserve
- Bimberi Nature Reserve
- Bogandyera Nature Reserve
- Boginderra Hills Nature Reserve
- Buddigower Nature Reserve
- Clarkes Hill Nature Reserve
- Cocopara Nature Reserve
- Courabyra Nature Reserve
- Downfall Nature Reserve
- Ellerslie Nature Reserve
- Flagstaff Memorial Nature Reserve
- Gubbata Nature Reserve
- Ingalba Nature Reserve
- Jerilderie Nature Reserve
- Jingellic Nature Reserve
- Lachlan Valley Nature Reserve
- Lake Urana Nature Reserve
- Langtree Nature Reserve
- Loughnan Nature Reserve
- Mudjarn Nature Reserve
- Mullengandra Nature Reserve
- Murrumbidgee Valley Nature Reserve
- Nest Hill Nature Reserve
- Nombinnie Nature Reserve
- Pucawan Nature Reserve
- Pulletop Nature Reserve
- South West Woodland Nature Reserve
- Tabletop Nature Reserve
- The Rock Nature Reserve
- The Charcoal Tank Nature Reserve
- Ulandra Nature Reserve
- Wiesners Swamp Nature Reserve
- Yanga Nature Reserve

==== Southeast & Tablelands ====
- Araluen Nature Reserve
- Badja Swamps Nature Reserve
- Barunguba Montague Island Nature Reserve
- Bees Nest Nature Reserve
- Bell Bird Creek Nature Reserve
- Bermaguee Nature Reserve
- Binjura Nature Reserve
- Black Andrew Nature Reserve
- Bobundara Nature Reserve
- Bondi Gulf Nature Reserve
- Bournda Nature Reserve
- Broulee Island Nature Reserve
- Burnt School Nature Reserve
- Burra Creek Nature Reserve
- Burrinjuck Nature Reserve
- Cecil Hoskins Nature Reserve
- Coolumbooka Nature Reserve
- Coornartha Nature Reserve
- Cullendulla Creek Nature Reserve
- Cuumbeun Nature Reserve
- Dananbilla Nature Reserve
- Dangelong Nature Reserve
- Eagles Claw Nature Reserve
- Egan Peaks Nature Reserve
- Frogs Hole Nature Reserve
- Good Good Nature Reserve
- Goorooyarroo Nature Reserve
- Gungewalla Nature Reserve
- Hattons Corner Nature Reserve
- Illawong Nature Reserve
- Illunie Nature Reserve
- Ironmungy Nature Reserve
- Jerralong Nature Reserve
- Joadja Nature Reserve
- Koorawatha Nature Reserve
- Kuma Nature Reserve
- Kybeyan Nature Reserve
- Meringo Nature Reserve
- Merriangaah Nature Reserve
- Mount Clifford Nature Reserve
- Mount Dowling Nature Reserve
- Mundoonen Nature Reserve
- Myalla Nature Reserve
- Nadgee Nature Reserve
- Nadgigomar Nature Reserve
- Ngadang Nature Reserve
- Nimmo Nature Reserve
- Numeralla Nature Reserve
- Oak Creek Nature Reserve
- Paupong Nature Reserve
- Queanbeyan Nature Reserve
- Quidong Nature Reserve
- Razorback Nature Reserve
- Robertson Nature Reserve
- Scabby Range Nature Reserve
- Scott Nature Reserve
- Stony Creek Nature Reserve
- Strike-a-Light Nature Reserve
- Tinderry Nature Reserve
- Tollgate Islands Nature Reserve
- Turallo Nature Reserve
- Undoo Nature Reserve
- Wadjan Nature Reserve
- Wanna Wanna Nature Reserve
- Wee Jasper Nature Reserve
- Wollondilly River Nature Reserve
- Wullwye Nature Reserve
- Yanununbeyan Nature Reserve
- Yaouk Nature Reserve
- Young Nature Reserve

==== Sydney & Surrounds ====
- Agnes Banks Nature Reserve
- Castlereagh Nature Reserve
- Dalrymple-Hay Nature Reserve
- Dural Nature Reserve
- Gulguer Nature Reserve
- Kemps Creek Nature Reserve
- Long Island Nature Reserve
- Mulgoa Nature Reserve
- Muogamarra Nature Reserve
- Newington Nature Reserve
- Pitt Town Nature Reserve
- Prospect Nature Reserve
- Towra Point Nature Reserve
- Wallumatta Nature Reserve
- Windsor Downs Nature Reserve
- Wianamatta Nature Reserve

=== State Conservation Areas ===
State Conservation Areas, formerly referred to as State Recreation Areas, are managed by the Department of Environment and Climate Change.

==== Central West & Orana ====
- Beni State Conservation Area
- Biddon State Conservation Area
- Cobboro State Conservation Area
- Cooleburba State Conservation Area
- Durridgere State Conservation Area
- Goodiman State Conservation Area
- Goonoo State Conservation Area
- Goulburn River State Conservation Area
- Merriwindi State Conservation Area
- Mount Canobolas State Conservation Area
- Mugii Murum-ban State Conservation Area
- Mullion Range State Conservation Area
- Pilliga West State Conservation Area
- Ukerbarley State Conservation Area

==== Far West ====
- Balowra State Conservation Area
- Barwon State Conservation Area
- Bedooba State Conservation Area
- Gundabooka State Conservation Area
- Langidoon-Metford State Conservation Area
- Mount Grenfell State Conservation Area
- Mungo State Conservation Area
- Mutawintji State Conservation Area
- Nombinnie State Conservation Area
- Paroo-Darling State Conservation Area
- Pilliga West State Conservation Area
- Toorale State Conservation Area
- Warrambool State Conservation Area

==== Hunter & Central Coast ====
- Barrakee State Conservation Area
- Barrington Tops State Conservation Area
- Black Bulga State Conservation Area
- Bulahdelah State Conservation Area
- Coneac State Conservation Area
- Copeland Tops State Conservation Area
- Curracabundi State Conservation Area
- Durridgere State Conservation Area
- Gir-um-bit State Conservation Area
- Glenrock State Conservation Area
- Jilliby State Conservation Area
- Karuah State Conservation Area
- Kumbatine State Conservation Area
- Lake Macquarie State Conservation Area
- Medowie State Conservation Area
- Munmorah State Conservation Area
- Sugarloaf State Conservation Area
- Talawahl State Conservation Area
- Tilligerry State Conservation Area
- Tuggerah State Conservation Area
- Werakata State Conservation Area
- Wollemi State Conservation Area
- Worimi State Conservation Area
- Yango State Conservation Area

==== Illawarra-Shoalhaven ====
- Colymea State Conservation Area
- Garawarra State Conservation Area
- Illawarra Escarpment State Conservation Area
- Macquarie Pass State Conservation Area
- Morton State Conservation Area

==== New England-North West ====
- Avondale State Conservation Area
- Bingara State Conservation Area
- Bullawa State Conservation Area
- Butterleaf State Conservation Area
- Carrai State Conservation Area
- Cottan-Bimbang State Conservation Area
- Currys Gap State Conservation Area
- Gwydir Wetlands State Conservation Area
- Killarney State Conservation Area
- Leard State Conservation Area
- Maroomba State Conservation Area
- Mummel Gulf State Conservation Area
- Oxley Wild Rivers State Conservation Area
- Pilliga State Conservation Area
- Pilliga East State Conservation Area
- Pilliga West State Conservation Area
- Terry Hie Hie State Conservation Area
- The Cells State Conservation Area
- Torrington State Conservation Area
- Trinkey State Conservation Area
- Warialda State Conservation Area
- Washpool State Conservation Area
- Wondoba State Conservation Area

==== North Coast ====
- Banyabba State Conservation Area
- Bindarri State Conservation Area
- Bundjalung State Conservation Area
- Bungawalbin State Conservation Area
- Carrai State Conservation Area
- Cascade State Conservation Area
- Chaelundi State Conservation Area
- Chambigne State Conservation Area
- Chatsworth Hill State Conservation Area
- Corymbia State Conservation Area
- Everlasting Swamp State Conservation Area
- Gumbaynggirr State Conservation Area
- Gurranang State Conservation Area
- Guy Fawkes River State Conservation Area
- Jackywalbin State Conservation Area
- Kindee State Conservation Area
- Kooyong State Conservation Area
- Lake Innes State Conservation Area
- Lawrence Road State Conservation Area
- Mount Hyland State Conservation Area
- Nymboi-Binderai State Conservation Area
- Nymboida State Conservation Area
- Queens Lake State Conservation Area
- The Cells State Conservation Area
- Toonumbar State Conservation Area
- Walgun Cape Byron State Conservation Area
- Whian Whian State Conservation Area
- Wollumbin State Conservation Area
- Wombat Creek State Conservation Area
- Yarringully State Conservation Area
- Yuraygir State Conservation Area

==== Riverina-Murray ====
- Combaning State Conservation Area
- Lachlan Valley State Conservation Area
- Livingstone State Conservation Area
- Mullengandra State Conservation Area
- Nombinnie State Conservation Area
- Tumblong State Conservation Area
- Wereboldera State Conservation Area
- Woomargama State Conservation Area
- Yanga State Conservation Area

==== Southeast & Tablelands ====
- Bargo State Conservation Area
- Bargo River State Conservation Area
- Berlang State Conservation Area
- Bungonia State Conservation Area
- Kybeyan State Conservation Area
- Macanally State Conservation Area
- Macquarie Pass State Conservation Area
- Majors Creek State Conservation Area
- Monga State Conservation Area
- Tallaganda State Conservation Area
- Yanununbeyan State Conservation Area
- Yurammie State Conservation Area

==== Sydney & Surrounds ====
- Bents Basin State Conservation Area
- Burragorang State Conservation Area
- Dharawal State Conservation Area
- Gandangara State Conservation Area
- Garawarra State Conservation Area
- Maroota Ridge State Conservation Area
- Nattai State Conservation Area
- Parr State Conservation Area
- Yerranderie State Conservation Area

=== Regional Parks ===
Regional Parks are managed by the Department of Environment and Climate Change.

==== Far West ====
- Euston Regional Park

==== Hunter & Central Coast ====
- Blue Gum Hills Regional Park
- Worimi Regional Park

==== Illawarra-Shoalhaven ====
- Bomaderry Creek Regional Park
- Corramy Regional Park
- Killalea Regional Park

==== North Coast ====
- Coffs Coast Regional Park
- Goolawah Regional Park

==== Riverina-Murray ====
- Lachlan Valley Regional Park
- Murray Valley Regional Park
- Murrumbidgee Valley Regional Park

==== Sydney & Surrounds ====
- Berowra Valley Regional Park
- Edmondson Regional Park
- Leacock Regional Park
- Ngula Bulgarabang Regional Park
- Parramatta River Regional Park
- Rouse Hill Regional Park
- Wianamatta Regional Park
- William Howe Regional Park
- Wolli Creek Regional Park
- Yellomundee Regional Park
- Yerranderie Regional Park

=== Aboriginal Areas ===
Aboriginal Areas are managed by local Aboriginal communities and the Department of Environment and Climate Change.

==== Central West & Orana ====
- Dandry Gorge Aboriginal Area
- Snake Rock Aboriginal Area
- Ukerbarley Aboriginal Area

==== Far West ====
- Pindera Downs Aboriginal Area

==== Hunter & Central Coast ====
- Appletree Aboriginal Area
- Finchley Aboriginal Area
- Howe Aboriginal Area
- Mooney Mooney Aboriginal Area

==== Illawarra-Shoalhaven ====
- Cullunghutti Aboriginal Area
- Murramarang Aboriginal Area

==== New England-North West ====
- Bandahngan Aboriginal Area
- Boonalla Aboriginal Area
- Bulagaranda (Mount Yarrowyck) Aboriginal Area
- Deriah Aboriginal Area
- Ngiyungbayi Aboriginal Area
- Serpentine Aboriginal Area
- Stonewoman Aboriginal Area
- Willala Aboriginal Area

==== North Coast ====
- Clybucca Aboriginal Area
- Dubay Nurahm Aboriginal Area
- Jubullum Flat Camp Aboriginal Area
- Lennox Head Aboriginal Area
- Nambucca Aboriginal Area
- Nunguu Mirral Aboriginal Area
- Ti-Tree Lake Aboriginal Area

==== Sydney & Surrounds ====
- Mount Kuring-gai Aboriginal Area

=== Historic Sites ===
Historic Sites are managed by the Department of Environment and Climate Change.

==== Central West & Orana ====
- Hartley Historic Site
- Hill End Historic Site
- Maynggu Ganai Historic Site
- Yuranighs Aboriginal Grave Historic Site

==== Far West ====
- Mount Grenfell Historic Site
- Mutawintji Historic Site

==== North Coast ====
- Clybucca Historic Site
- Innes Ruins Historic Site
- Roto House Historic Site
- South Solitary Island Historic Site
- Tweed Heads Historic Site

==== Riverina-Murray ====
- Koonadan Historic Site

==== Southeast & Tablelands ====
- Davidson Whaling Station Historic Site

==== Sydney & Surrounds ====
- Cadmans Cottage Historic Site
- Maroota Historic Site
- Wisemans Ferry Historic Site

=== State Parks ===
State Parks are managed by the Land and Property Management Authority.

- Belmont State Park
- Coffs Coast State Park
- Burrinjuck Waters State Park
- Copeton Waters State Park
- Goolawah State Park
- Grabine Lakeside State Park
- Lake Burrendong State Park
- Lake Glenbawn State Park
- Lake Keepit State Park
- Wyangala Waters State Park

=== Karst Conservation Reserves ===
Four Karst Conservation Reserves are managed by the Jenolan Caves Reserve Trust.

- Abercrombie Caves
- Borenore Caves
- Jenolan Caves
- Wombeyan Caves

== Marine protected areas ==
=== Marine Parks ===
Marine Parks are managed by the New South Wales Marine Parks Authority.

- Batemans Marine Park
- Cape Byron Marine Park
- Jervis Bay Marine Park
- Lord Howe Island Marine Park
- Port Stephens-Great Lakes Marine Park
- Solitary Islands Marine Park

=== Aquatic reserves ===
Aquatic reserves are managed by the New South Wales Department of Primary Industries.

- Cook Island Aquatic Reserve, Tweed Heads
- Barrenjoey Head Aquatic Reserve, Hawkesbury River
- Narrabeen Head Aquatic Reserve
- Long Reef Aquatic Reserve
- Cabbage Tree Bay Aquatic Reserve, Manly
- North Harbour Aquatic Reserve, Sydney
- Bronte-Coogee Aquatic Reserve
- Cape Banks Aquatic Reserve, La Perouse
- Boat Harbour Aquatic Reserve, Kurnell
- Towra Point Aquatic Reserve, Botany Bay
- Shiprock Aquatic Reserve, Port Hacking
- Bushrangers Bay Aquatic Reserve, Shellharbour

== See also ==
- List of national parks of Australia
- Protected areas of Australia
