= Murrumbidgee Valley National Park =

National park in New South Wales, Australia

- IUCN category II (national park)
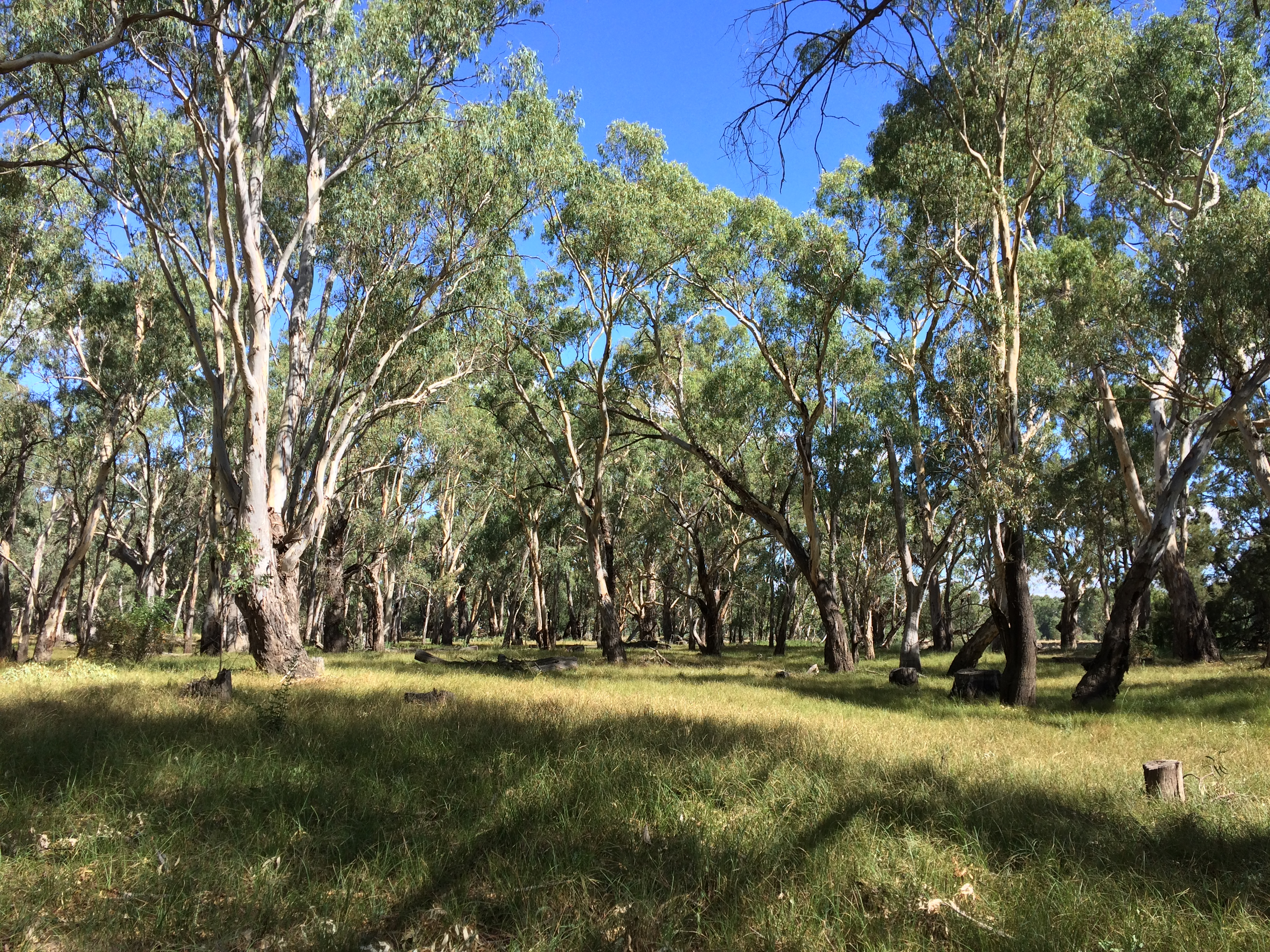
- MIA 1 precinct of the Murrumbidgee Valley National Park

- Location within New South Wales
- Location: New South Wales
- Nearest city: Hay
- Coordinates: 34°42′54″S 146°12′04″E
- Area: 477.03 km^{2} (184.18 sq mi)
- Established: 1 July 2010
- Governing body: NSW National Parks & Wildlife Service
- Website: Official website

The Murrumbidgee Valley National Park is a protected national park in the Riverina region of New South Wales, in eastern Australia. The 47,703-hectare (117,880-acre) national park is located approximately 6 kilometres (3.7 mi) east of Hay, and approximately 15 kilometres (9.3 mi) west of Narrandera. The park protects part of what is now the largest continuous tract of river red gum forest in the world.

The Murrumbidgee Valley River Park, when combined with the Murrumbidgee Valley Nature Reserve, comprise a number of separate precincts spread over 250 kilometres (160 mi) along the valley of the Murrumbidgee River, mostly between Collingullie that is 30 kilometres (19 mi) west of Wagga Wagga, and Hay. The parks fall within the Riverina bioregion.

== Features ==
The precincts that make up the Murrumbidgee Valley River Parks are generally quite small and narrow and collectively span a large section of river frontage. They consist of a number of former state forests.

Wetlands, river red gum forests, woodlands and grasslands, all of which are found in the Murrumbidgee Valley River Parks, are widely acknowledged as among the most threatened ecosystems in Australia. The inclusion of forested wetlands in the national park system is significant given they occur only in riverine corridors and floodplains on rich alluvial soils prized for their timber and an agricultural production. The river red gum forests are an important component of the broader Murrumbidgee floodplain ecosystem. They contribute valuable ecosystem services, including carbon sequestration, in the otherwise heavily cleared bioregion. The Murrumbidgee River is highly modified due to irrigation in the region which has altered natural flooding regimes. Land use surrounding the reserves includes dry land and irrigated cropping, grazing of natural and improved pastures, and private forestry harvesting.

== See also ==
- Protected areas of New South Wales
