= Strike-a-Light Nature Reserve =

Protected area in New South Wales, Australia

- IUCN category Ia (strict nature reserve)
- Location within New South Wales
- Location: New South Wales
- Nearest city: Jerangle
- Coordinates: 35°49′40″S 149°18′52″E
- Established: January 2001
- Governing body: NSW National Parks & Wildlife Service

The Strike-a-Light Nature Reserve is a protected nature reserve in the Monaro region of New South Wales, in eastern Australia. The 407-hectare (1,010-acre) reserve is situated five kilometres north-west of Jerangle and 55 kilometres south of Queanbeyan.

The reserve was created in January 2001 as part of the Southern Regional Forest Agreement. Prior to this, the area was Crown land.

== See also ==
- Protected areas of New South Wales
