= Killabakh Nature Reserve =

Protected area in New South Wales, Australia

- IUCN category Ia (strict nature reserve)
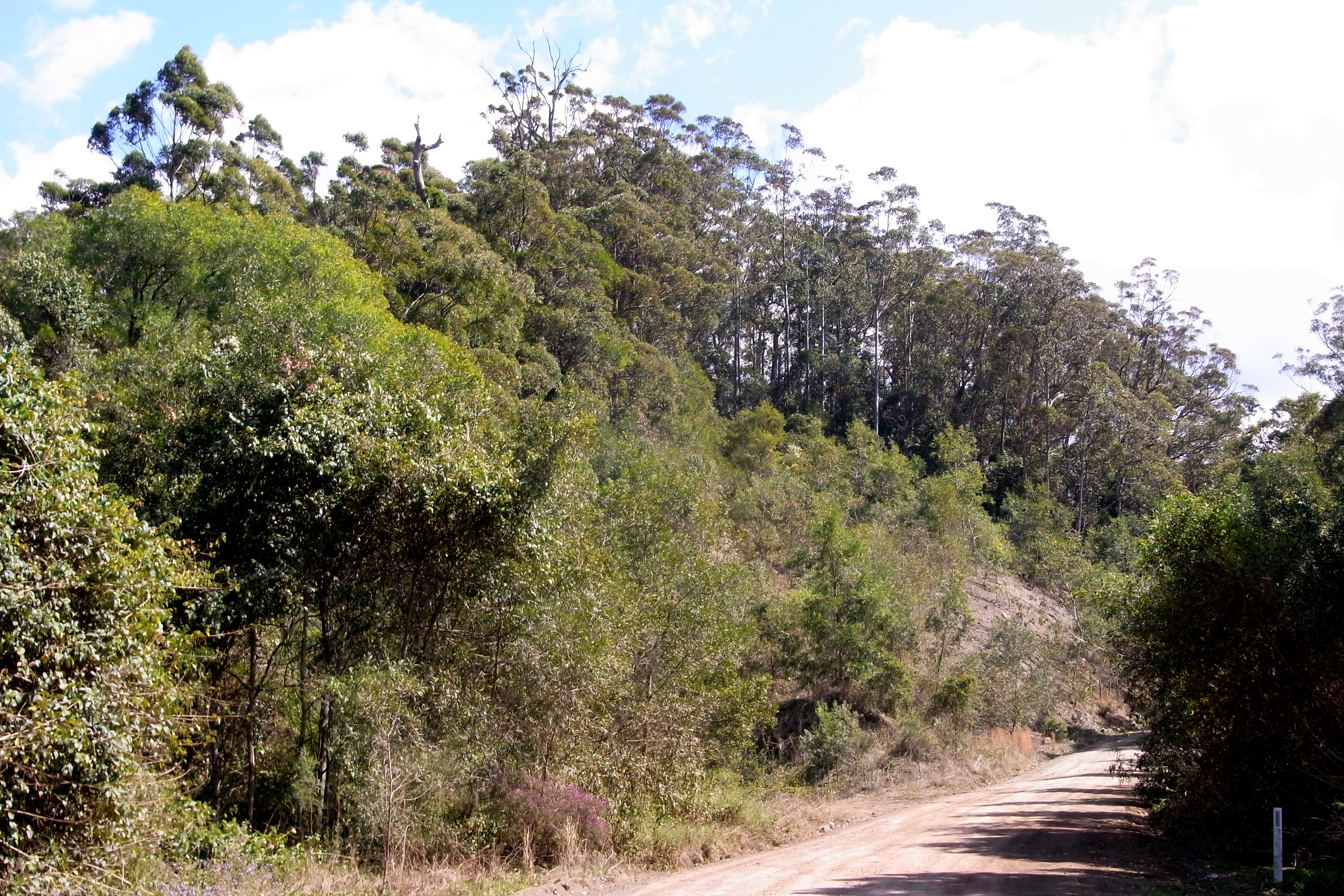

- Location within New South Wales
- Location: New South Wales
- Nearest city: Taree
- Coordinates: 31°39′09″S 152°24′00″E
- Area: 2,644 km^{2} (1,021 sq mi)
- Established: January 1999
- Governing body: NSW National Parks & Wildlife Service
- Website: Official website

The Killabakh Nature Reserve is a protected nature reserve located in the Mid North Coast region of New South Wales, Australia. The 2,644-hectare (6,530-acre) reserve is situated approximately 30 kilometres (19 mi) north of Taree. Flora includes wet sclerophyll eucalyptus forest and rainforest. The word Killabakh is derived from the Worimi language meaning “blue gum”, a common local species of tree.

The reserve is part of the Coxcomb, Goonook, and Killabakh Nature Reserves, a network of wilderness and other protected areas along the Great Eastern Escarpment of the Great Dividing Range which, combined, contributes significantly to the aim of the initiative to connect and conserve mountain ecosystems running the length of eastern Australia.

== See also ==
- Protected areas of New South Wales
