= Oolambeyan National Park =

National park in New South Wales

- IUCN category II (national park)
- Location within New South Wales
- Location: New South Wales
- Nearest city: Carrathool
- Coordinates: 34°43′17″S 145°16′21″E
- Area: 222.31 km^{2} (85.83 sq mi)
- Established: November 2001
- Governing body: NSW National Parks & Wildlife Service

Oolambeyan is a 22,231 hectare national park located south of Carrathool and 46 kilometres (29 mi) south east of Hay in the Riverina region of south western New South Wales, Australia.

Oolambeyan Station was once a grazing property for its merino stud which was purchased by the Government of New South Wales in November 2001.

Park provides a great opportunity for day visitors to activities such as bushwalking, picnicking and bird watching, near Hay and Griffith.

Among the animal species, carpet snakes, shingle-backed lizards, lace monitors, gray and red kangaroos can be found here.

== See also ==
- Protected areas of New South Wales
