= Garrawilla National Park =

National park of New South Wales, Australia

- IUCN category II (national park)
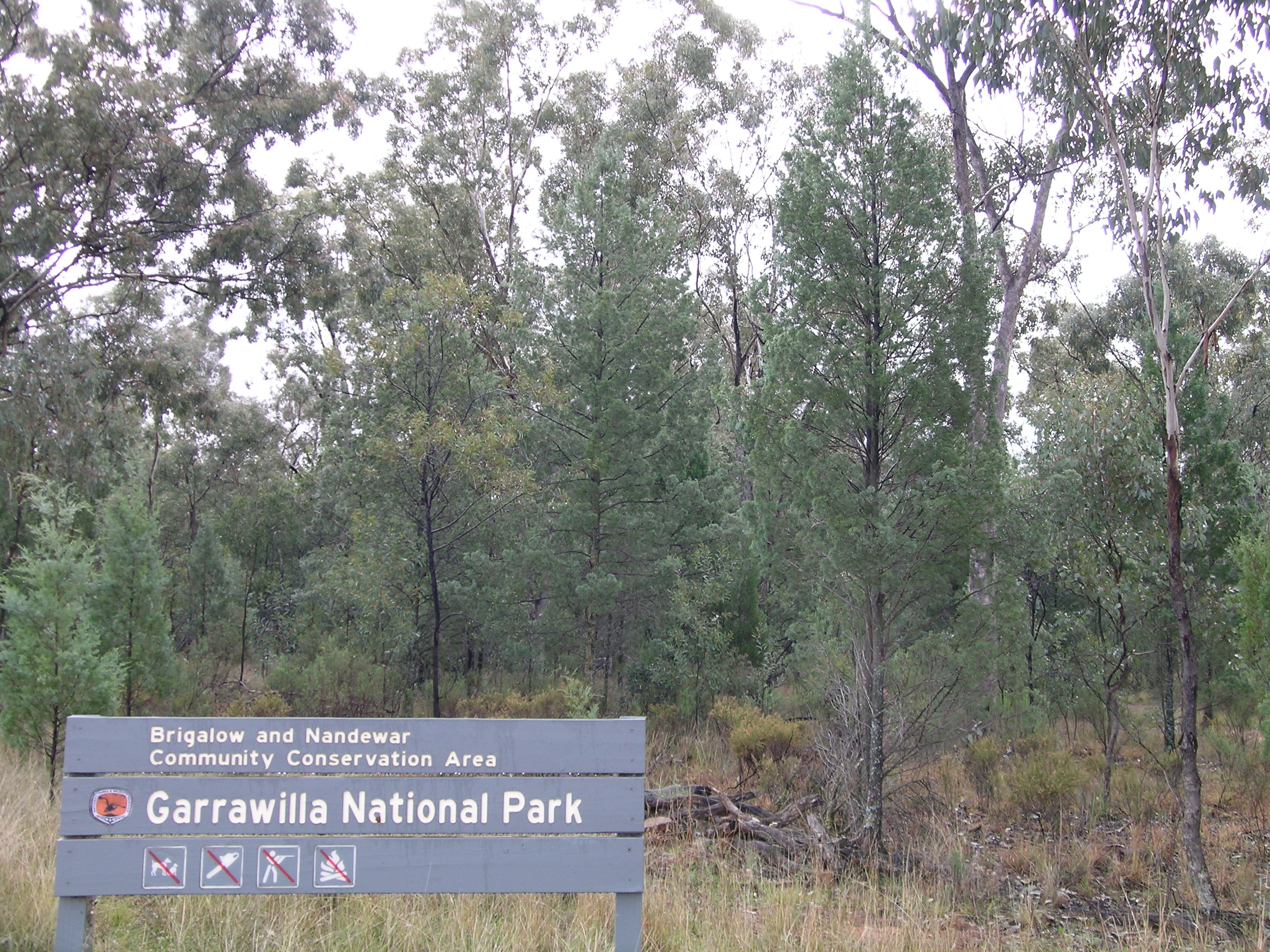
- Garrawilla National Park

- Location within New South Wales
- Location: New South Wales
- Nearest city: Coonabarabran
- Coordinates: 31°6′46″S 149°38′20″E
- Area: 9.37 km^{2} (3.62 sq mi)
- Governing body: NSW National Parks & Wildlife Service

Garrawilla National Park was created in December 2005. It covers an area of 937 hectares. This park is located on the northern side of the Oxley Highway approximately halfway between Coonabarabran and Mullaley in New South Wales, Australia.

== See also ==
- Protected areas of New South Wales
