= Bungawalbin National Park =

National park in Australia

- IUCN category II (national park)
- Location within New South Wales
- Location: New South Wales
- Coordinates: 29°05′53″S 153°08′38″E
- Area: 37 km^{2} (14 sq mi)
- Established: 1999
- Governing body: NSW National Parks & Wildlife Service
- Website: https://www.nationalparks.nsw.gov.au/visit-a-park/parks/Bungawalbin-National-Park

Bungawalbin is a national park in New South Wales, Australia, 563 kilometres (350 mi) north of Sydney. Originally known as Bungawalbin Nature Reserve, it was granted National Park status in 1999. The Bungawalbin and Yarringully parks together form part of an adjacent wetland system containing important subtropical rainforests in floodplains.

== See also ==
- Protected areas of New South Wales
