= Carrai National Park =

National park in Australia

- IUCN category II (national park)
- Location within New South Wales
- Location: New South Wales
- Nearest city: Kempsey, New South Wales
- Coordinates: 30°53′35″S 152°14′31″E
- Area: 104 km^{2} (40 sq mi)
- Established: 1 January 1999
- Governing body: New South Wales National Parks and Wildlife Service
- Website: http://www.environment.nsw.gov.au/NationalParks/parkHome.aspx?id=N0119

Carrai is a national park located in New South Wales, Australia, 347 kilometres (216 mi) north of Sydney. Not far from the north coast of New South Wales, located on a granite plateau, lies Carrai National Park. Surrounded and protected by vast areas of eucalyptus and subtropical rainforests, stands the Carrai plateau with steep slopes that dramatically descend to the Kunderang stream and the Macleay river.

== See also ==
- Protected areas of New South Wales
