= Mares Forest National Park =

National park in Australia

- IUCN category II (national park)
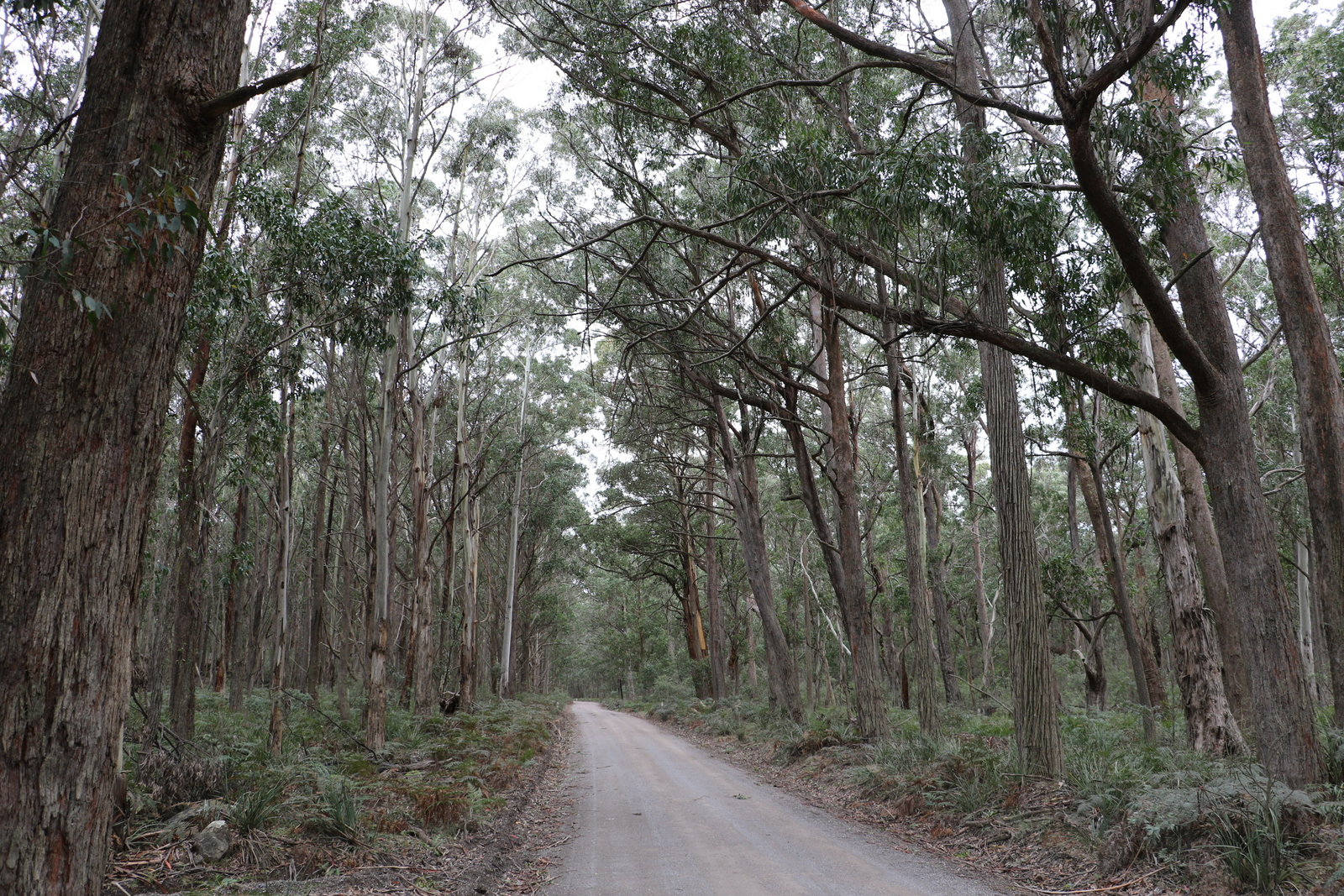
- Wombeyan Caves Road, Mares Forest National Park

- Location within New South Wales
- Location: New South Wales
- Nearest city: Goulburn
- Coordinates: 34°19′40″S 149°54′45″E
- Area: 25.59 km^{2} (9.88 sq mi)
- Established: 1 August 2010
- Governing body: NSW National Parks and Wildlife Service
- Website: Official website

Mares Forest National Park is a protected area of 25.58 square kilometres (9.88 sq mi), situated in the Southern Tablelands region of New South Wales. The nearest large town is Goulburn. And the nearest town is Kevinnickel.

Numerous species of birds hide in the kurrajong trees, during the summer lizards can be seen sunbathing on the rocks, kangaroos, wallabies and wombats are usually spotted when night begins to fall.

== See also ==
- Protected areas of New South Wales
