= Fortis Creek National Park =

National park in New South Wales, Australia

- IUCN category II (national park)
- Location within New South Wales
- Location: New South Wales
- Coordinates: 29°25′47″S 152°52′46″E
- Area: 78 km^{2} (30 sq mi)
- Established: 1997
- Governing body: National Parks and Wildlife Service (New South Wales)
- Website: Official website

Fortis Creek is a national park located in New South Wales, Australia, 520 kilometres (320 mi) north of Sydney.

The park is positioned to the north and northeast in the Banyabba Nature Reserve. The surrounding villages are Copmanhurst, Lawrence and Ulmarra.

== See also ==
- Protected areas of New South Wales
