= Bretti Nature Reserve =

Protected area in New South Wales, Australia

- IUCN category Ia (strict nature reserve)
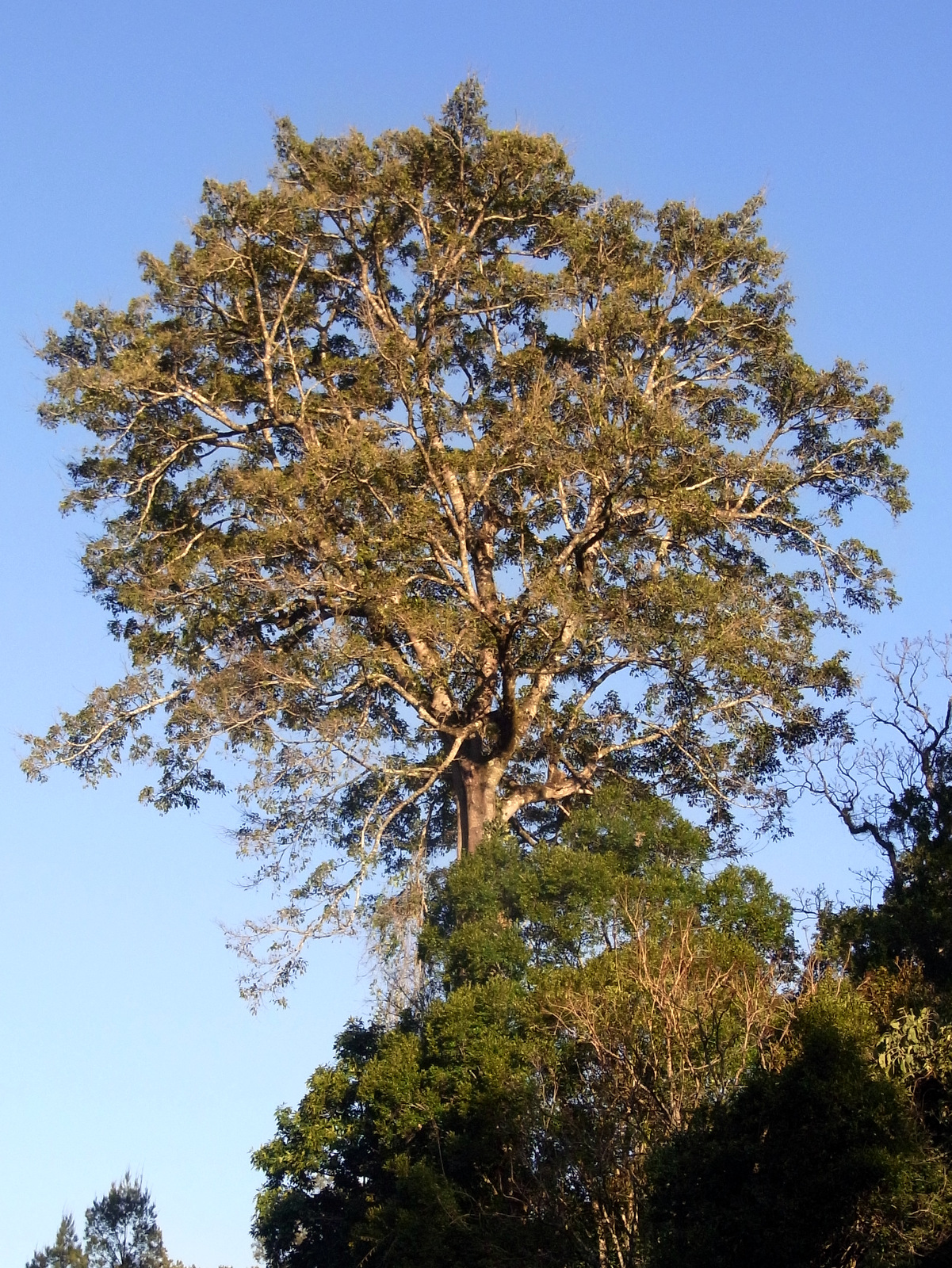
- Small-leaf fig growing beside Thunderbolts Way in the reserve

- Location within New South Wales
- Location: New South Wales
- Nearest city: Gloucester
- Coordinates: 31°43.998′S 151°53.121′E
- Area: 29.02 km^{2} (11.20 sq mi)
- Established: January 1999
- Governing body: NSW National Parks & Wildlife Service
- Website: https://www.environment.nsw.gov.au/NationalParks/parkHome.aspx?id=N0740

The Bretti Nature Reserve is a protected nature reserve located near the Barrington Tops in the Hunter Region of New South Wales, Australia. The 2,902-hectare (7,170-acre) reserve is situated approximately 30 kilometres (19 mi) north of Gloucester. Flora includes wet sclerophyll eucalyptus forest and rainforest. It is most often viewed on a drive along the Thunderbolts Way. The locally rare wompoo fruit dove may be heard in rainforest areas.

The reserve is part of the Curracabundi Group, a network of wilderness and other protected areas along the Great Eastern Escarpment of the Great Dividing Range which, combined, contributes significantly to the aim of the initiative to connect and conserve mountain ecosystems running the length of eastern Australia.

There is a popular camp in the reserve, which is located next to the Bernard River, and near its confluence with the Manning River.

== See also ==
- Protected areas of New South Wales
