= Middle Brother National Park =

National park in Australia

- IUCN category II (national park)
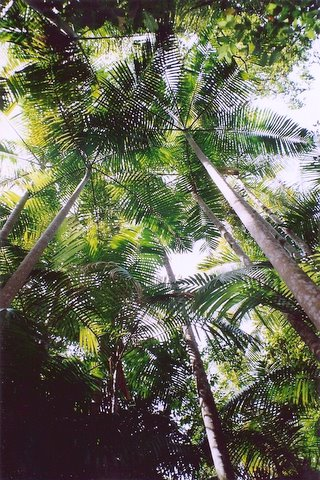
- Bangalow Palm forest at Middle Brother National Park

- Location within New South Wales
- Location: New South Wales
- Nearest city: Laurieton
- Coordinates: 31°41′39″S 152°40′15″E
- Area: 18.3 km^{2} (7.1 sq mi)
- Established: 1 January 1999
- Governing body: NSW National Parks and Wildlife Service
- Website: Official website

Middle Brother National Park is a protected area of 1830 hectares, situated in the Mid North Coast region of New South Wales. The nearest large town is Laurieton. The high rainfall and volcanic soils produce outstanding eucalyptus forest and rainforest. Large flooded gum and blackbutt grow in sheltered areas.

The national park was formed to protect the two largest (by volume) coastal black beech trees - Bird Tree and Benaroon. Scientists believe that the bird tree is over 300 years old. It reaches a height of 69 metres (226 ft) and is 11 metres (36 ft) in circumference. For members of the Aboriginal people of Birpai, who are the traditional owners of the land, Middle Brother National Park has significant cultural importance.

== See also ==
- Protected areas of New South Wales
