= Wee Jasper Nature Reserve =

Nature reserve of New South Wales, Australia

- IUCN category Ia (strict nature reserve)
- Location within New South Wales
- Location: New South Wales
- Nearest city: Wee Jasper
- Coordinates: 35°06′28″S 148°39′30″E
- Area: 6.3 km^{2} (2.4 sq mi)
- Established: November 1979
- Governing body: NSW National Parks and Wildlife Service
- Website: Official website

The Wee Jasper Nature Reserve is a protected nature reserve in the Southern Tablelands region of New South Wales, in eastern Australia. The 630-hectare (1,600-acre) reserve is situated to the west of the Goodradigbee River arm of Burrinjuck Dam near the rural locality of Wee Jasper.

== Features ==
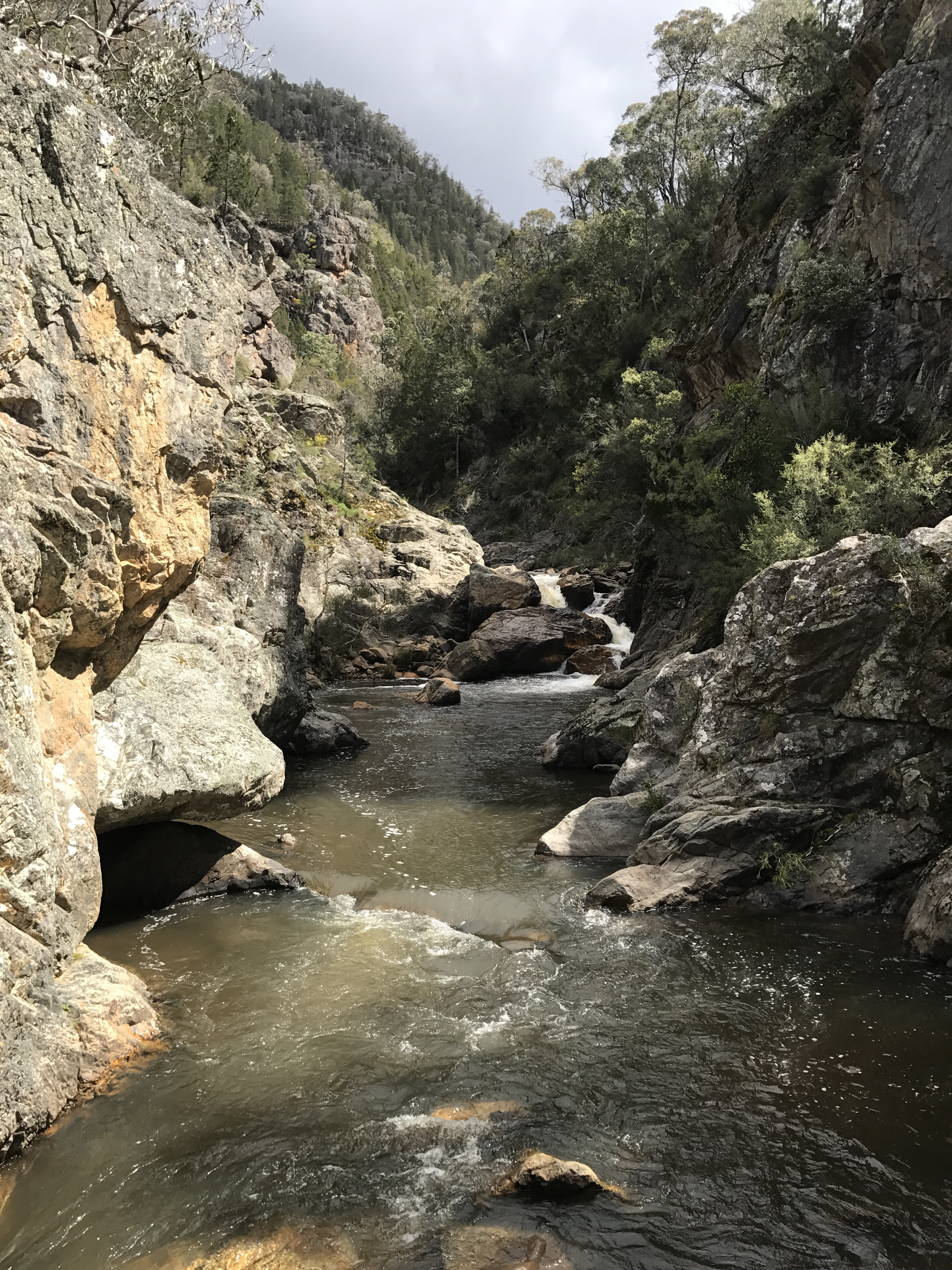
Wee Jasper Waterfalls

The reserve was created in 1979 with 426.2 ha (1,053 acres) of land. 204.8 ha (506 acres) were added in 1986 and 1.7 ha (4.2 acres) were added in July 2001.

=== Flora ===
Four distinct forest ecosystems exist in the reserve:

- Apple box - Norton's box moist grass forest – This ecosystem exists on south east facing slopes in the southern part of the reserve.
- Brittle gum - broad-leaved peppermint - Poa grass forest – This ecosystem exists on moderately exposed, east-facing slopes.
- Norton's box - Poa grass forest – This ecosystem exists on west-facing slopes in the south of the reserve.
- River she-oak forest – This ecosystem exists along Wee Jasper Creek in the south of the reserve.

==== Threatened species ====
The Australian anchor plant (Discharia pubescens) and limestone brittle-moss (Orthotrichum cupulatum) are rare. The Yass daisy (Ammobium craspedioides) is listed as vulnerable under the Threatened Species Conservation Act 1995 (NSW) (TSCA 1995). The Wee Jasper grevillea (Grevillea iaspicula) and the formbe pepper-cress (Lepidium pseudopapillosum) are listed as endangered under the TSCA 1995.

=== Fauna ===
60 species of animal have been identified in the reserve.

== See also ==
- Protected areas of New South Wales
