= The Glen Nature Reserve =

Protected area in New South Wales, Australia

- IUCN category Ia (strict nature reserve)
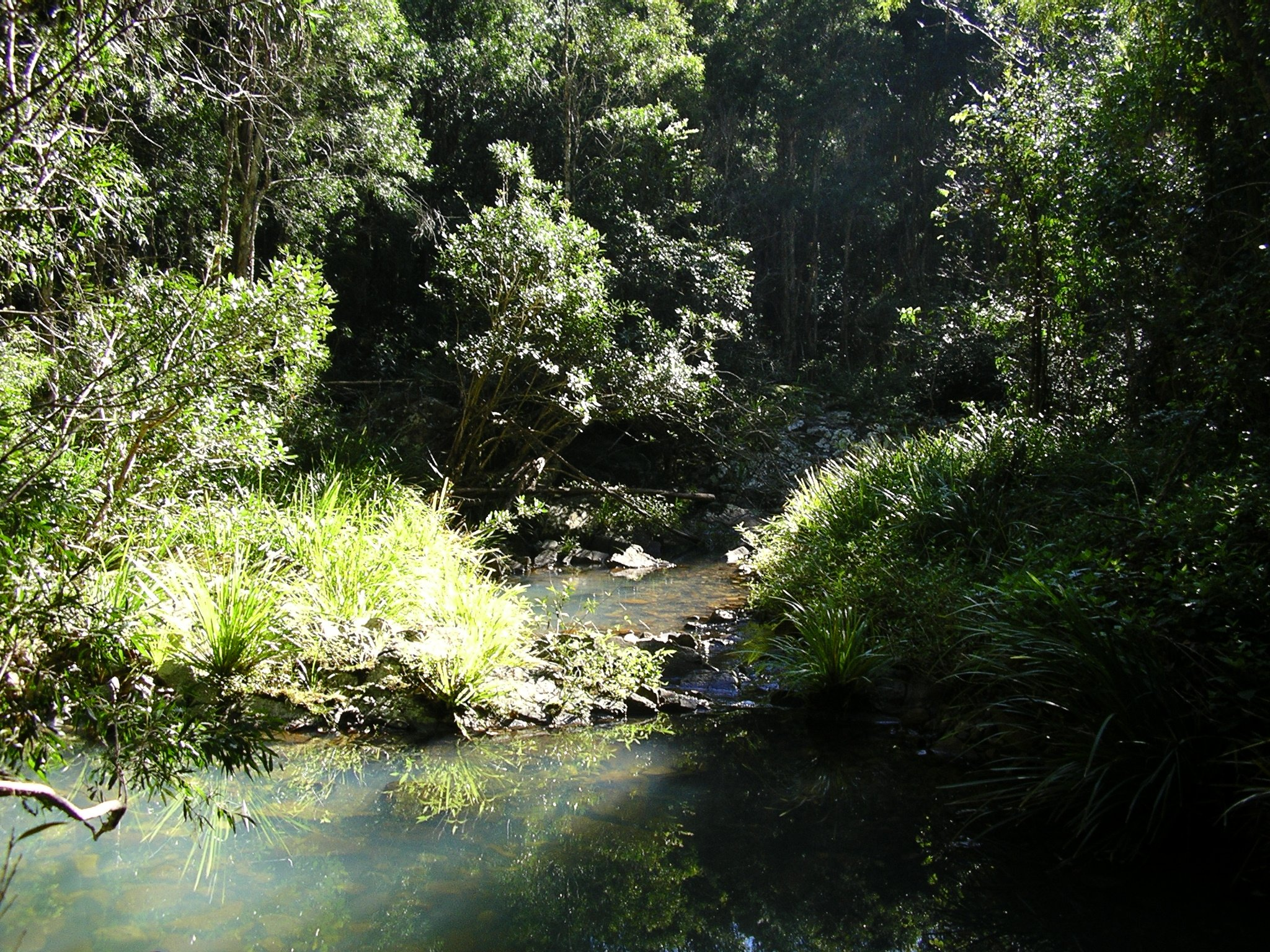
- Small creek within the nature reserve

- Location within New South Wales
- Location: New South Wales
- Nearest city: Gloucester
- Coordinates: 32°10′S 152°02′E
- Area: 27.5 km^{2} (10.6 sq mi)
- Established: January 1999
- Governing body: NSW National Parks and Wildlife Service
- Website: Official website

The Glen Nature Reserve is a protected nature reserve in the Hunter Region of New South Wales, in eastern Australia. The 2,750-hectare (6,800-acre) reserve, which was gazetted in January 1999, is situated approximately 25 kilometres (16 mi) south-east of Gloucester, off Bucketts Way.

== Features ==
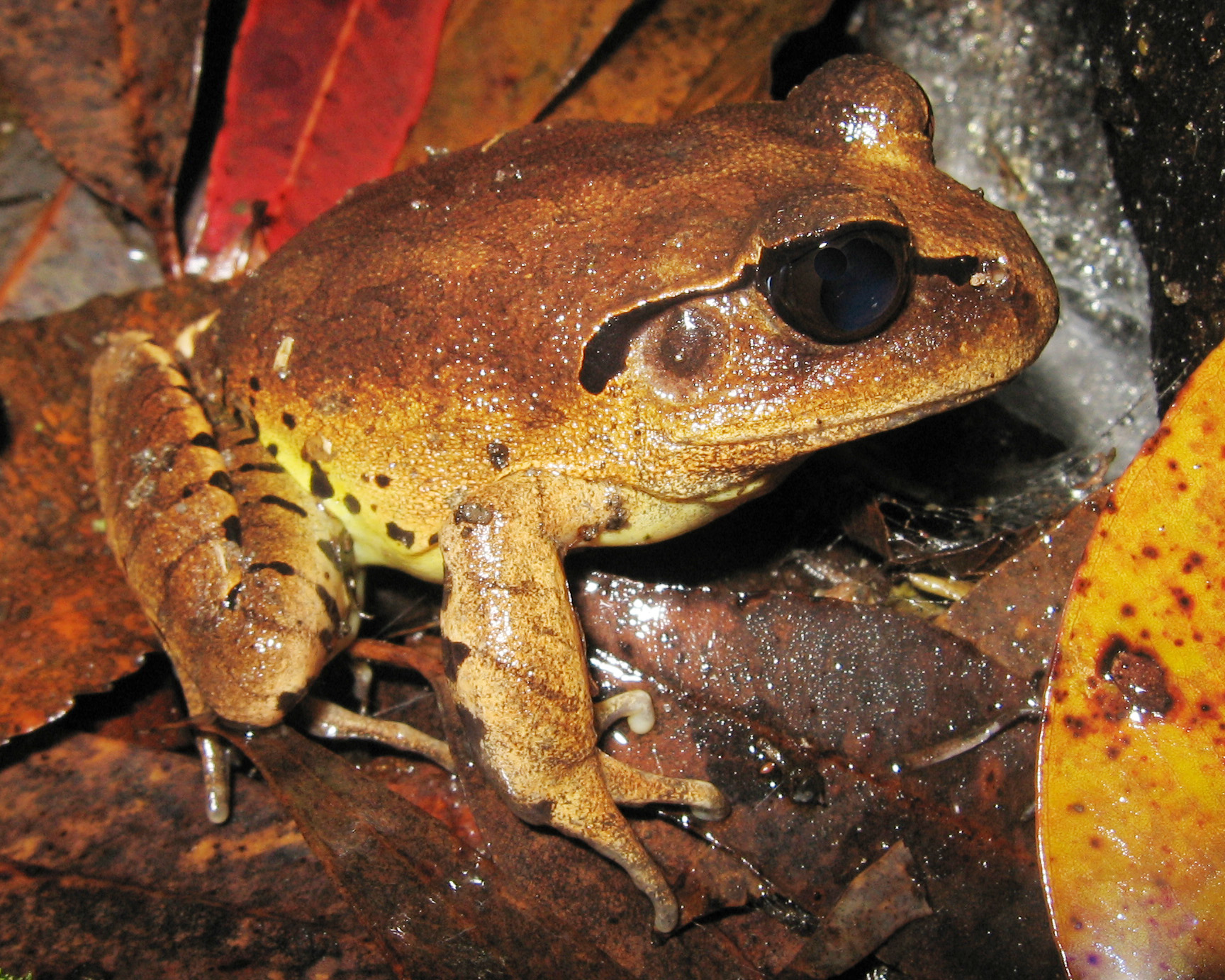
A great barred frog (Mixophyes fasciolatus) found in the nature reserve

The reserve is predominantly sclerophyll forest, and contains many endangered species of flora and fauna.

=== Flora ===
The Glen Nature Reserve consists of sub-tropical, sclerophyll forest. The major vegetation types are Eucalyptus and Angophora, with many species of fern and orchid.

=== Fauna ===
The fauna of The Glen Nature Reserve is well studied, and includes a large biodiversity. There are 14 species of frog, over 70 species of bird, over 20 species of mammal and 18 species of reptile, found in the nature reserve, with more species expected to be found. There are many endangered species of animal within the nature reserve, including the koala (Phascolarctos cinereus) and the yellow-bellied glider (Petaurus australis).

== See also ==
- Protected areas of New South Wales
