= Eagles Claw Nature Reserve =

Protected area in New South Wales, Australia

- IUCN category IV (habitat/species management area)
- Location within New South Wales
- Location: New South Wales
- Nearest city: Eden
- Coordinates: 37°04′22″S 149°55′00″E
- Area: 0.01 km^{2} (0.0039 sq mi)
- Established: 27 March 1986
- Governing body: NSW National Parks & Wildlife Service
- Website: Official website

The Eagles Claw Nature Reserve is a protected nature reserve that is located on the south coast of the state of New South Wales, Australia. The 1-hectare (2.5-acre) reserve protects a strip of rugged coastline in the vicinity of Lookout Point at the town of Eden. The reserve was gazetted on 27 March 1986, to give protection to what was then thought to be the only known mainland breeding colony of little penguins in the state.

== Description ==
The location is a scenic attraction deriving its name from the appearance, when viewed from the north, of a bird's three-taloned foot. It abuts a residential subdivision of Eden.

The reserve encloses a set of four narrow sea gutters, or small bays, surrounded by low cliffs. Boulders and boulder debris from the cliffs contain crevices and cavities where the penguins nest. There are dense stands of coastal scrub dominated by bracelet honey myrtle above the cliffs.

== See also ==
- Protected areas of New South Wales
