= Couchy Creek Nature Reserve =

Protected area in New South Wales, Australia

- IUCN category Ia (strict nature reserve)
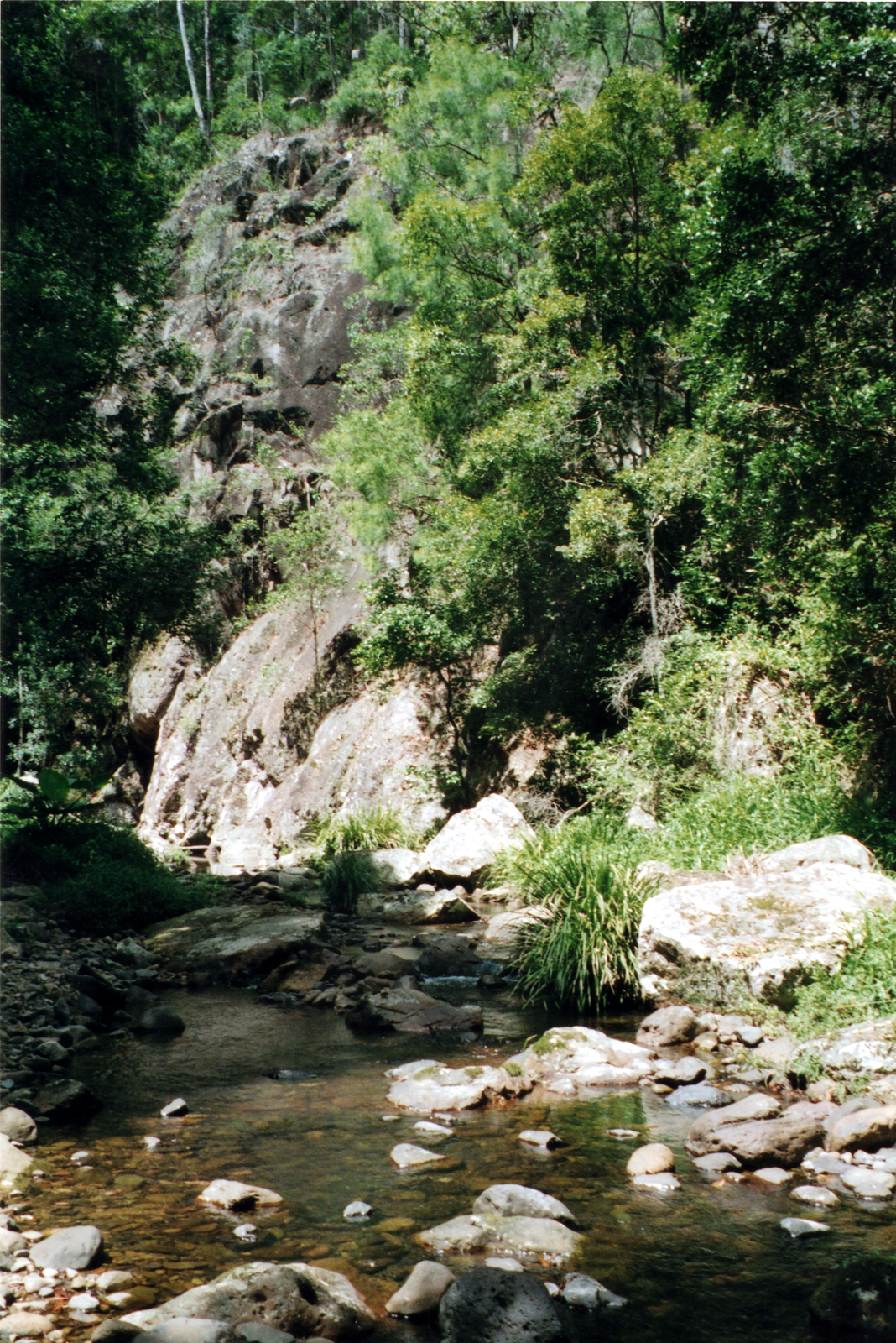
- Couchy Creek

- Location within New South Wales
- Location: New South Wales
- Nearest city: Murwillumbah
- Coordinates: 28°16′21.39″S 153°16′37.57″E
- Area: 217 km^{2} (84 sq mi)
- Established: January 1999
- Governing body: NSW National Parks & Wildlife Service
- Website: https://www.nationalparks.nsw.gov.au/visit-a-park/parks/couchy-creek-nature-reserve

Couchy Creek Nature Reserve is a protected nature reserve located in the Northern Rivers region of New South Wales, Australia. The 217-hectare (540-acre) reserve is situated approximately 12 kilometres (7.5 mi) north west of Murwillumbah, and 3.5 kilometres from the state border with Queensland.

Established in 1999, Couchy Creek Nature Reserve is part of an important vegetation corridor and contains wet sclerophyll eucalyptus forest and endangered lowland rainforest. Ten threatened species have been recorded, including the Crystal Creek Walnut and Davidsons Plum.

== See also ==
- Protected areas of New South Wales
