= Ghin-Doo-Ee National Park =

National park in Australia

- IUCN category II (national park)
- Location within New South Wales
- Location: New South Wales
- Nearest city: Bulahdelah
- Coordinates: 32°15′44″S 152°7′1″E
- Area: 47.9356 km^{2} (18.5080 sq mi)
- Established: 23 January 1999
- Governing body: National Parks and Wildlife Service (New South Wales)
- Website: Official website

Ghin-Doo-Ee is a national park in New South Wales, Australia, 200 km northeast of Sydney. Its name comes from the Gadjang word for the Australian brushturkey.

The average elevation of the terrain is 250 metres.

== See also ==
- Protected areas of New South Wales
