= Stotts Island Nature Reserve =

Protected area in New South Wales, Australia

- IUCN category Ia (strict nature reserve)
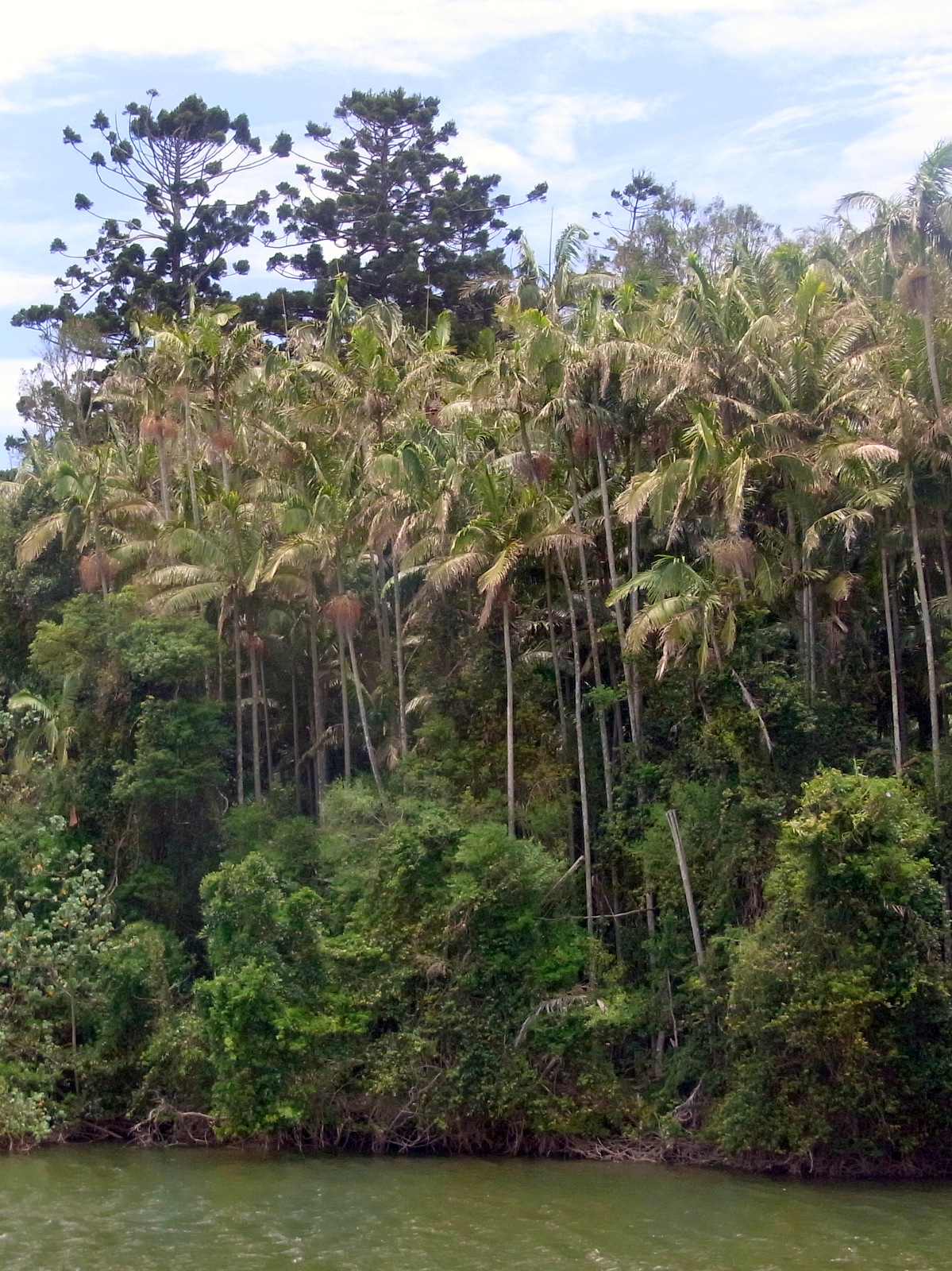
- Hoop pine & Bangalow palm at Stotts Island

- Location within New South Wales
- Location: New South Wales
- Nearest city: Tweed Heads
- Coordinates: 28°16′15″S 153°29′51″E
- Area: 1.41 km^{2} (0.54 sq mi)
- Established: 25 June 1971
- Governing body: NSW National Parks & Wildlife Service
- Website: Official website

The Stotts Island Nature Reserve is a protected nature reserve containing the Stotts Island, a river island, in the Tweed River, in the Northern Rivers region of New South Wales in eastern Australia. The 141-hectare (350-acre) reserve is situated near Tweed Heads and 12 kilometres (7.5 mi) northeast of Murwillumbah.

The island was named after James Stott, an early cedar cutter. Originally an Irish convict, he was sentenced in 1826 to seven years transportation to New South Wales for the theft of clothing.

== Features ==
Stotts Island is composed of alluvium deposited from the Pleistocene to the present. It is prone to flooding, during which times silt and weed material accumulate on the island. The island is continuously being reshaped by erosion.

The reserve contains an intact 77-hectare (190-acre) segment of lowland sub-tropical rainforest. Most of this rainforest type has been destroyed for agriculture, mining or housing. Stotts Island is declared critical habitat for the endangered Mitchell's rainforest snail, rediscovered in 1976. The rainforest is particularly tall and impressive. Species of rainforest tree include hoop pine, bangalow palm, tuckeroo, red cedar, giant water gum, hard quandong, cigar cassia and white fig. The endangered red-fruited ebony has been planted in the adjacent Bruce Chick Conservation Park. Its current status on the island is in doubt. It was recorded as a seedling on the island in 1957, the first known live specimen since 1917. Bruce Chick was a local resident who encouraged revegetation of the riverside rainforest.

Weeds that have invaded nearby rainforest include madeira vine (Anredera cordifolia), cat's claw (Macfadyena unguis-cati), moonflower (Ipomoea alba) and lantana (Lantana camara), although the rainforest on the island itself has been little affected to date.

47 species of bird, 6 species of lizard, 3 species of snakes and 3 species of frogs have been recorded on Stotts Island Nature Reserve. Mammal species and populations are poorly known.

== See also ==
- List of islands of New South Wales
- Protected areas of New South Wales
