= Yarriabini National Park =

National park in Australia

- IUCN category II (national park)
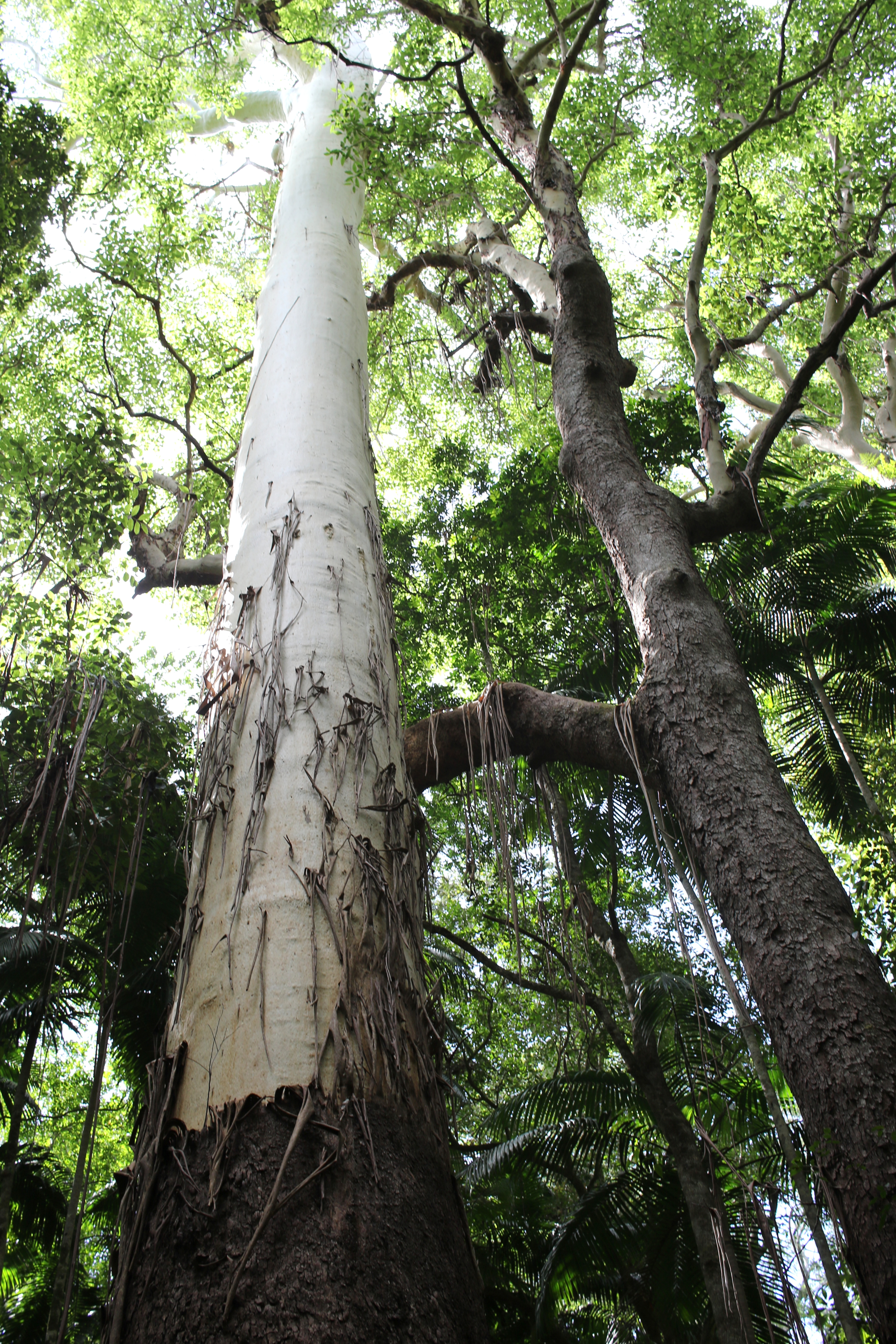
- rainforest with rose gum & brush box

- Location within New South Wales
- Location: New South Wales
- Nearest city: Macksville
- Coordinates: 30.784988333333°S 152.94903°E
- Area: 2,092 ha (8.08 sq mi)
- Established: 1 January 2003
- Governing body: NSW National Parks and Wildlife Service
- Website: Official website

Yarriabini National Park is a protected area of 2092 hectares, situated in the Mid North Coast region of New South Wales. The nearest large town is Macksville. The high rainfall and relatively fertile soils produce outstanding eucalyptus forest and rainforest. Large rose gum and hoop pine grow in sheltered areas. "Yarriabini" is said to mean "koala rolling".

The elevation of the terrain is 354 metres (1,161 ft).

== Climate ==
Summer temperature averages range from 18°C to 27°C, and winter range from 11°C and 19°C.

== See also ==
- Protected areas of New South Wales
