= Mount Pikapene National Park =

National park in Australia

Mount Pikapene
- IUCN category II (national park)
- Location within New South Wales
- Location: New South Wales
- Coordinates: 29°00′40″S 152°41′42″E
- Area: 26.3 km^{2} (10.2 sq mi)
- Established: 1 January 1999
- Visitors: 654321 (in 2005)
- Governing body: National Parks and Wildlife Service (New South Wales)

Mount Pikapene is a national park located in New South Wales, Australia.

The part of the park that consists of tall moist rainforests, is dominated by gray gum, spotted gum, turpentine, pink bloodwood, and brush box.

The highest peak in the national park is Big Sugarloaf, rising 525 metres above sea level.

== See also ==
- Protected areas of New South Wales
