= Black Andrew Nature Reserve =

Protected area in New South Wales, Australia

- IUCN category Ia (strict nature reserve)
- Location within New South Wales
- Location: New South Wales
- Nearest city: Wee Jasper
- Coordinates: 35°02′34″S 148°35′09″E
- Area: 15.59 km^{2} (6.02 sq mi)
- Established: 2001
- Governing body: NSW National Parks & Wildlife Service
- Website: https://www.environment.nsw.gov.au/nationalparks/parkHome.aspx?id=N0820

The Black Andrew Nature Reserve is a protected nature reserve located on the south west slopes of New South Wales, Australia. The 1,559-hectare (3,850-acre) reserve is situated on the southern shore of Burrinjuck Dam on the Murrumbidgee River, an important reservoir for the Murrumbidgee Irrigation Area.

== History ==
The reserve was created in 2001 and is managed by the New South Wales National Parks and Wildlife Service under the provisions of the Southern Regional Forest Agreement (SRFA). Prior to creation of the reserve, it was Crown land and was managed by the then-New South Wales Department of Land and Water Conservation.

== Ecology ==
=== Flora ===
Seven distinct forest ecosystems have been identified in the reserve:

- Blue gum – peppermint dry grass/shrub forest. This ecosystem lives on soils underlain by granite rock. Common plant species include blue gum (Eucalyptus bicostata), broad-leaved peppermint (Eucalyptus dives), red stringybark (Eucalyptus macrorhyncha), narrow-leaved peppermint (Eucalyptus robertsonii ssp. robertsonii), silver wattle (Acacia dealbata), shiny cassinia (Cassinia longifolia), austral bracken fern (Pteridium esculentum), guinea flower (Hibbertia obtusifolia), prickly broom-heath (Monotoca scoparia) and snow grass (Poa sp.).
- Moist ribbon gum grassy forest. This ecosystem lives on soils underlain by basalt rock. Common plant species include ribbon gum (Eucalyptus viminalis), narrow-leaved peppermint (Eucalyptus robertsonii ssp. robertsonii), silver wattle (Acacia dealbata), austral bracken fern (Pteridium esculentum), bidgee-widge (Acaena novae-zelandiae), native geranium (Geranium solanderi var. solanderi), kidneyweed (Dichondra repens), snow grass (Poa meionectes) and weeping grass (Microlaena stipoides).
- Macphersons Swamp grassy forest. This ecosystem lives on deep colluvium along stream banks. Common plant species include apple box (Eucalyptus bridgesiana), narrow-leaved peppermint (Eucalyptus robertsonii ssp. robertsonii), black sallee (Eucalyptus stellulata), woolly tea-tree (Leptospermum lanigerum), black wattle (Acacia melanoxylon), dagger wattle (Acacia siculiformis), sweet bursaria (Bursaria spinosa), Australian anchor plant (Discaria pubescens), handsome flat-pea (Platylobium formosum), bidgee-widge (Acaena novae-zelandiae), weeping grass (Microlaena stipoides) and wattle mat-rush (Lomandra filiformis ssp. coriacea).
- Riparian gully forest. This ecosystem lives on deep colluvium or soils underlain by granite rock. Common plant species include black wattle (Acacia melanoxylon), blue gum (Eucalyptus bicostata), apple box (Eucalyptus bridgesiana), austral mulberry (Hedycarya angustifolia), austral bracken fern (Pteridium esculentum), silver wattle (Acacia dealbata), hazel pomaderris (Pomaderris aspera), shiny cassinia (Cassinia longifolia), weeping grass (Microlaena stipoides var. stipoides), snow grass (Poa meionectes), Senecio species and common wheatgrass (Elymus scaber var. scaber).
- Apple box – Norton's box moist grassy forest. This ecosystem lives on east-facing slopes on soils underlain by granite rock. Common plant species include apple box (Eucalyptus bridgesiana), Norton's box (Eucalyptus nortonii), silver wattle (Acacia dealbata), austral indigo (Indigofera adesmiifolia), stinking pennywort (Hydrocotyle laxiflora), native geranium (Geranium solanderi var. solanderi), weeping grass (Microlaena stipoides var. stipoides), snow grass (Poa meionectes), common wheatgrass (Elymus scaber var. scaber) and annual bluebell (Wahlenbergia stricta ssp. stricta).
- Escarpment long-leaved box – black cypress heath/shrub forest. This ecosystem lives on exposed rock faces in the north east part of the reserve. Common plant species include long-leaved box (Eucalyptus goniocalyx), common fringe-myrtle (Calytrix tetragona), guinea flower (Hibbertia calycina), varnish wattle (Acacia verniciflua), shiny cassinia (Cassinia longifolia), grass tree (Xanthorrhoea glauca ssp. angustifolia), Deane's wattle (Acacia deanei ssp. deanei), woolly grevillea (Grevillea lanigera x polybractea), bitter-pea (Daviesia pubigera), lily (Dianella revoluta var. revoluta), stiff geebung (Persoonia rigida)and leopard orchid (Diuris maculata).
- Norton's box – poa grass forest. This ecosystem lives on the western slopes of the reserve. Common plant species include Norton's box (Eucalyptus nortonii), red stringybark (Eucalyptus macrorhyncha), slender tea-tree (Leptospermum brevipes), shiny cassinia (Cassinia longifolia), guinea flower (Hibbertia obtusifolia), clustered everlasting (Chrysocephalum semipapposum) and snow grass (Poa sieberana).

=== Fauna ===
Three amphibian species, 16 reptile species, 29 mammal species and 83 bird species have been observed in the reserve. Of the mammal species, 11 are bats and 5 are non-native.

=== Vulnerable species ===
The Australian anchor plant (Discaria pubescens), yellow-bellied glider (Petaurus australis), common bent-wing bat (Miniopterus schreibersii), powerful owl (Ninox strenua), barking owl (Ninox connivens), brown treecreeper (Climacteris picumnus) and booroolong frog (Litoria booroolongensis) are all identified as vulnerable species in the Threatened Species Conservation Act 1995.

== See also ==
- Protected areas of New South Wales
