= Maria National Park =

National park in Australia

- IUCN category II (national park)
- Location within New South Wales
- Interactive map of Maria National Park
- Location: New South Wales
- Coordinates: 31°09′46″S 152°52′24″E
- Area: 23 km^{2} (8.9 sq mi)
- Established: 1999
- Governing body: NSW National Parks & Wildlife Service
- Website: Official website

Maria National Park is a national park in New South Wales, Australia, 341 kilometres (212 mi) northeast of Sydney. Part of the Hastings-Macleay Important Bird Area lies within its boundaries. The park is at an elevation of 33.48 metres.

== See also ==
- Protected areas of New South Wales
