= Junuy Juluum National Park =

National park in New South Wales, Australia

- IUCN category II (national park)
- Location within New South Wales
- Location: New South Wales
- Coordinates: 30°17′57″S 152°43′38″E
- Area: 9 km^{2} (3.5 sq mi)
- Established: 1999
- Governing body: NSW National Parks & Wildlife Service

Junuy Juluum is a national park located in New South Wales, Australia, 424 kilometres (263 mi) northeast of Sydney.

Positioned on the slopes of Campion Mountain, this remnant of warm temperate rainforest is a haven for paradise riflebirds and sooty owls.

The average elevation of the terrain is 743 metres.

== See also ==
- Protected areas of New South Wales
