= State parks of New South Wales =

The state parks of New South Wales are 18 protected areas in New South Wales, Australia reserved for camping, water sports and recreational uses. State parks are maintained by the New South Wales Department of Lands and managed by community trust boards.

They are:

- Bellinger Heads State Park, near Coffs Harbour at the mouth of the Bellinger and Kalang Rivers.
- Belmont State Park, Lake Macquarie (or Belmont Wetlands), 514 ha (1,270 acres) of wetlands and dunes, established as a state park in 2005.
- Burrinjuck Waters State Park (officially Burrinjuck State Recreation Area) 34°58′55″S 148°37′05″E, near Yass, 75 ha (185 acres) of bushland on the southern escarpment of Mount Barren Jack.
- Coffs Coast State Park (officially Coffs Coast Regional Park) 30°06′39″S 153°12′40″E, near Coffs Harbour 360 ha (890 acres).
- Copeton Waters State Park (officially Copeton State Recreation Area) 29°54′55″S 150°56′05″E near Armidale, 263 ha (650 acres) on the southern shore of Copeton Dam on the Gwydir River
- Cronulla State Park.
- Goolawah State Park, near Crescent Head.
- Grabine Lakeside State Park, 33°56′55″S 149°02′05″E, near Bigga, near Wyangala Dam.
- Harrington Beach State Park, 431 ha (1,065 acres) of ocean beaches adjoining Crowdy Head.
- Jervis Bay State Park.
- Killalea State Park (officially Killalea State Recreation Area) 34°35′55″S 150°52′04″E, near Wollongong, is a reserve covering approximately 265 ha (655 acres) of coastal land. It was named for Edward Killelea, a previous owner. It used to be a dairy farm. It is situated on the southern part of Bass Point, a peninsula south of Shellharbour. It includes a lagoon, Killalea Lagoon, two popular surfing beaches that are part of a national surfing reserve and camping grounds. The two beaches are called Mystics and The Farm, also known as Minnamurra and Killalea respectively. The reserve's southern extremity is the northern side of the entrance to the Minnamurra River. It also incorporates Stack Island, a small rocky island just offshore from the entrance.
- Lake Burrendong State Park, 32°40′45″S 149°07′56″E near Dubbo, 581 ha (1,436 acres) near Mumbil on the southwestern shore of Lake Burrendong.
- Lake Glenbawn State Park (officially Lake Glenbawn State Recreation Area) 32°05′55″S 151°00′04″E, in the Upper Hunter Valley.
- Lake Keepit State Park (officially Lake Keepit State Recreation Area) 30°53′55″S 150°30′04″E, between Tamworth and Narrabri, 4,370 ha (10,799 acres) on Lake Keepit and the Namoi River.
- Living Desert State Park, near Broken Hill.
- Manning Entrance State Park, 487 ha (1,203 acres) of ocean beaches on the Manning River.
- Wallaga Lake State Park 36°22′54″S 150°00′04″E.
- Wyangala Waters State Park 33°57′55″S 149°00′04″E, near Cowra.

== See also ==
- Protected areas of New South Wales
- State parks of Victoria, the only other state parks in Australia
