= Oak Creek Nature Reserve =

Protected area in New South Wales, Australia

- IUCN category Ia (strict nature reserve)
- Location within New South Wales
- Location: New South Wales
- Nearest city: Wee Jasper
- Coordinates: 35°03′45″S 148°40′37″E
- Area: 4.04 km^{2} (1.56 sq mi)
- Established: January 2001
- Governing body: NSW National Parks & Wildlife Service
- Website: Official website

The Oak Creek Nature Reserve is a protected nature reserve in the Southern Tablelands region of New South Wales, in eastern Australia. The 404-hectare (1,000-acre) reserve is situated near the rural locality of Wee Jasper.

The reserve was created in January 2001 as part of the Southern Regional Forest Agreement. Prior to this, the area was Crown land.

== See also ==
- Protected areas of New South Wales
