= Barrengarry Nature Reserve =

Protected area in New South Wales, Australia

- IUCN category Ia (strict nature reserve)
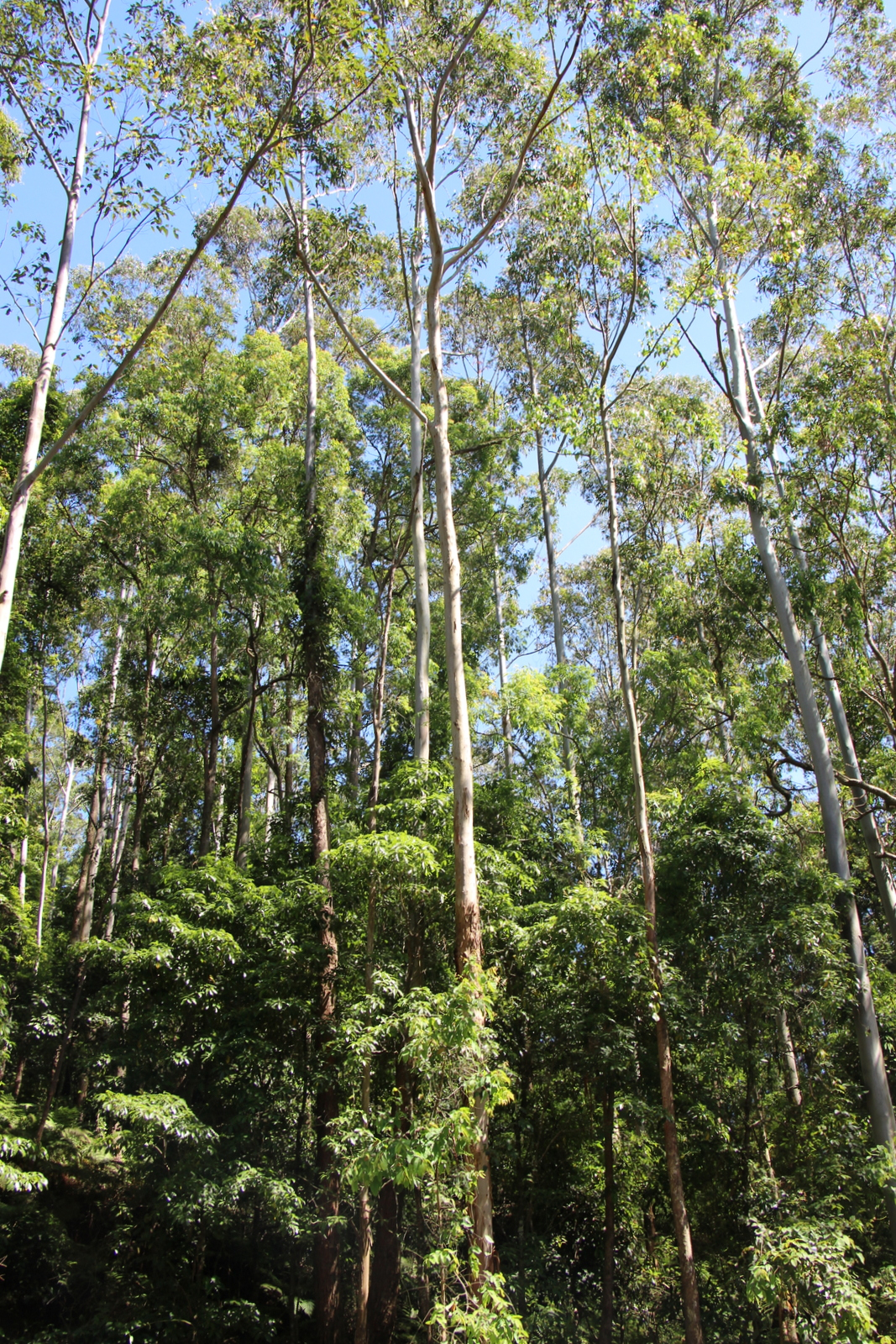
- eucalyptus forest

- Location within New South Wales
- Location: New South Wales
- Nearest city: Kangaroo Valley
- Coordinates: 34.681084°S 150.516480°E
- Area: 21 ha (52 acres)
- Established: 1 January 2001
- Governing body: NSW National Parks and Wildlife Service
- Website: http://www.environment.nsw.gov.au/resources/parks/09355KangarooValley.pdf

Barrengarry Nature Reserve is a protected area of 21 hectares, situated in Barrengarry in the Illawarra region of New South Wales. The nearest town is Kangaroo Valley. The reserve endeavours to protect rainforest communities and eucalyptus forest. As well as populations of threatened species such as the eastern bristlebird, brush-tailed rock-wallaby and long-nosed potoroo.

== See also ==
- Protected areas of New South Wales
