= Brunswick Heads Nature Reserve =

Protected area in New South Wales, Australia

- IUCN category IV (habitat/species management area)
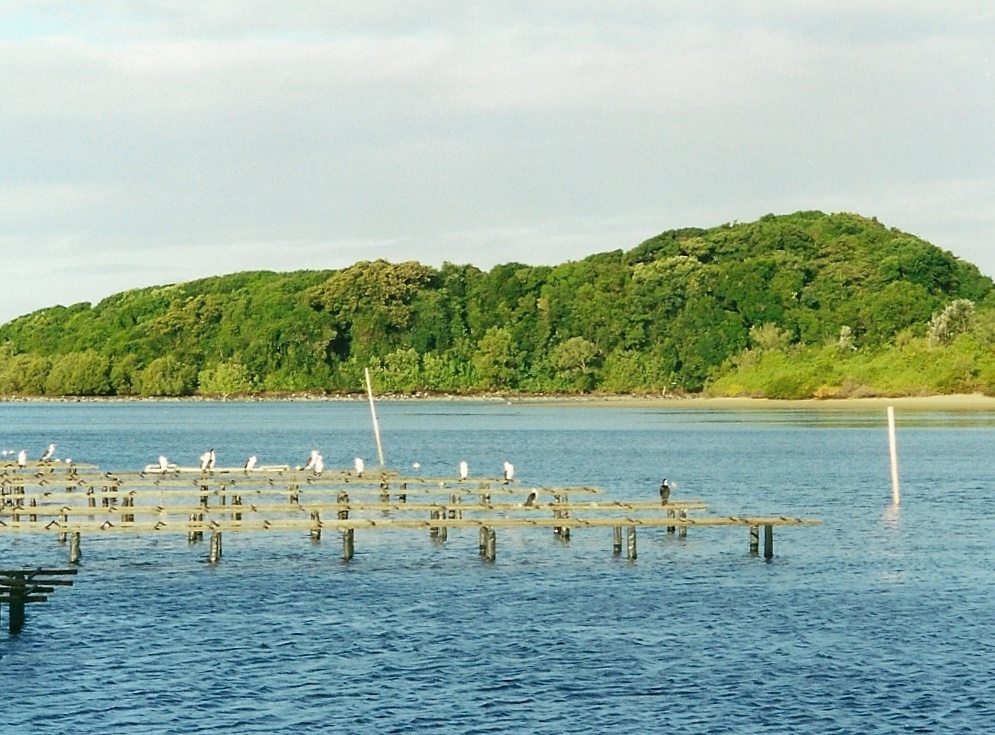
- Littoral rainforest in the reserve

- Location within New South Wales
- Location: New South Wales
- Nearest city: Brunswick Heads
- Coordinates: 28°32.133′S 153°33.206′E
- Area: 2.21 km^{2} (0.85 sq mi)
- Established: January 1979
- Governing body: NSW National Parks & Wildlife Service
- Website: http://www.environment.nsw.gov.au/nationalparks/parkHome.aspx?id=N0523

The Brunswick Heads Nature Reserve is a protected nature reserve located in the Northern Rivers region of New South Wales, Australia. The 221-hectare (550-acre) reserve is situated near Brunswick Heads and contains an intact segment of littoral rainforest. Situated between Brunswick Heads and Ocean Shores townships, it offers a variety of tourism activities. It is popular for school excursions, offers fishing, bird watching, cycling, nature walking, canoeing and picnicing.

Much of the Australian littoral rainforests have been destroyed for agriculture, mining or housing. Species of tree include tuckeroo, Three-veined Laurel, Myrtle Ebony, Wild Quince, Moreton Bay fig, Broad-leaf Lilly Pilly and Riberry. The rare Stinking Cryptocarya and scented acronychia are known from this area.

The reserve is a sanctuary for many endangered species of plants and animals which are found in and around the park. These include humpback whales which can be seen during the migration time and common blossom which is the smallest fruit bat in the world. Other threatened species found here are the grey-headed flying fox, loggerhead turtles, wallum froglet, pied oystercatchers, beach stone-curlews, etc. The list of endangered rainforest plants includes the Queensland xylosma, durobby, scented acronychia and white lace flower.

== See also ==
- Protected areas of New South Wales
