= Mount Nothofagus National Park =

National park in New South Wales, Australia

- IUCN category II (national park)
- Location within New South Wales
- Location: New South Wales
- Nearest city: Kyogle
- Coordinates: 28°19′02″S 152°38′01″E
- Area: 22 km^{2} (8.5 sq mi)
- Established: 1 January 1999
- Governing body: NSW National Parks & Wildlife Service
- Website: Official website

The Mount Nothofagus National Park is a protected national park located in the Northern Rivers region of New South Wales, Australia. The 2,180-hectare (5,400-acre) park is located approximately 634 kilometres (394 mi) north of Sydney and can be located via Kyogle via the Bruxner Highway and the Summerland Way.

The average elevation of the terrain is 746 metres above sea level.

The park is part of the Focal Peak Group World Heritage Site Gondwana Rainforests of Australia inscribed in 1986 and added to the Australian National Heritage List in 2007.

The park is also part of the Scenic Rim Important Bird Area, identified as such by BirdLife International because of its importance in the conservation of several species of threatened birds.

In November 2019 about three quarters of the park were burnt in a bushfire, during a period of drought that was so severe that most of the rainforest gullies, which are usually moist enough to act as buffers to fire, were destroyed.

== See also ==
- Protected areas of New South Wales
- High Conservation Value Old Growth forest
