= Towarri National Park =

National park in New South Wales

- IUCN category II (national park)
- Location within New South Wales
- Location: New South Wales
- Coordinates: 31°50′45″S 150°4′25″E
- Area: 36.39 km^{2} (14.05 sq mi)
- Established: 1998
- Governing body: National Parks and Wildlife Service (New South Wales)
- Website: Official website

Towarri is a national park located in New South Wales, Australia, 230 kilometres (140 mi) north of Sydney.

Towarri is a diverse landscape with a variety of plant vegetation, it is also a habitat for many birds among others and the endangered speckled warbler.

The average elevation of the terrain is 502 metres.

== See also ==
- Protected areas of New South Wales
