= Ngambaa Nature Reserve =

Protected area in New South Wales, Australia

- IUCN category II (national park)
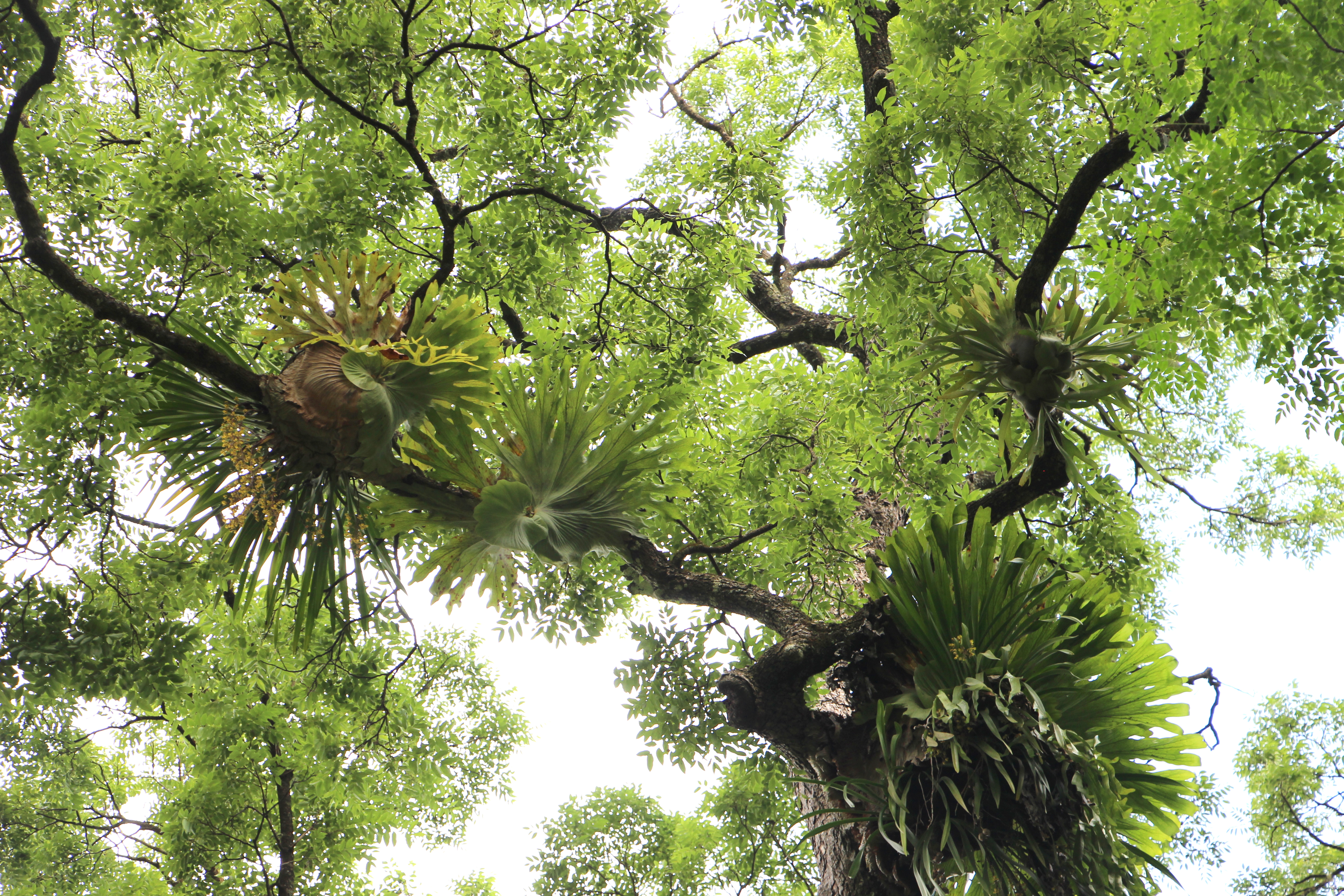
- red cedar & epiphytes

- Location within New South Wales
- Location: New South Wales
- Nearest city: Macksville
- Coordinates: 30°52′48″S 152°46′54″E
- Area: 10,560 ha (40.8 sq mi)
- Established: 1 January 1999
- Governing body: NSW National Parks and Wildlife Service
- Website: Official website

Ngambaa Nature Reserve, including Red Cedar Park, is a protected area of 10,560 hectares, situated in the Mid North Coast region of New South Wales. The nearest large town is Macksville. The reserve endeavours to protect many rare and threatened flora and fauna species, such as rainforest and four species of ironbark trees. An interesting local species is the small bolwarra, one of the most primitive of flowering plants. The landscapes are of significance to the local Aboriginal communities, and contain relics of historical use by non-Aboriginal people.

One of the inhabitants of the park is the powerful owl, Australia's largest owl. One pair can hunt on an area of 1000 hectares, so it is difficult to spot them. Their main food is possums and sugar gliders.

The reserve is located at 139 meters above sea level.

== See also ==
- Protected areas of New South Wales
