= Ramornie National Park =

National park in Australia

- IUCN category II (national park)
- Location within New South Wales
- Location: New South Wales
- Coordinates: 29°42′41″S 152°40′24″E
- Area: 31.6 km^{2} (12.2 sq mi)
- Established: 1999
- Governing body: NSW National Parks & Wildlife Service
- Website: Official website

Ramornie is a national park in New South Wales, Australia, 485 km north of Sydney, and 40 km west of Grafton on the NSW North Coast.

Sixteen species of eucalyptus have been recorded in the park.

== See also ==
- Protected areas of New South Wales
