= Single National Park =

National park in New South Wales, Australia

- IUCN category II (national park)
- Location within New South Wales
- Location: New South Wales
- Coordinates: 29°59′49″S 151°24′41″E
- Area: 25.63 km^{2} (9.90 sq mi)
- Established: 1999
- Governing body: NSW National Parks & Wildlife Service
- Website: Official website

Single is a national park in New South Wales, Australia, 432 km north of Sydney. The park was established in 1999 and has an area of 25.63 km^{2}. The average elevation of the terrain is 1033 metres.

== See also ==
- Protected areas of New South Wales
