= Cabbage Tree Bay Aquatic Reserve =

Marine protected area in Australia

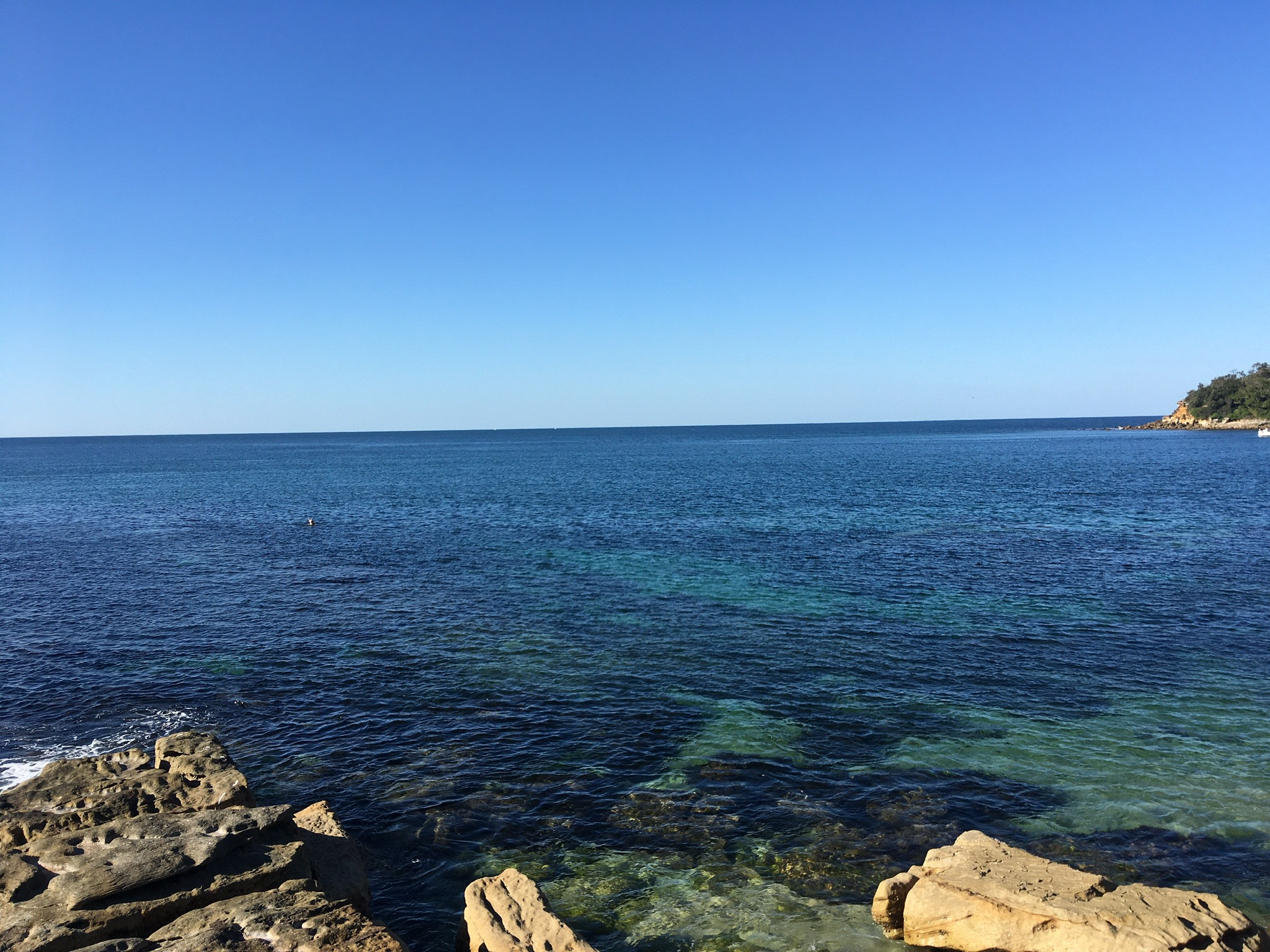
- Cabbage Tree Bay

- Location within New South Wales
- Location: New South Wales
- Coordinates: 33°48′0″S 151°17′42″E
- Area: 17 ha (42 acres)
- Established: 31 March 2002
- Governing body: Department of Primary Industries
- Website: https://www.dpi.nsw.gov.au/fishing/marine-protected-areas/aquatic-reserves/cabbage-tree-bay-aquatic-reserve

Cabbage Tree Bay Aquatic Reserve is a marine protected area located in Manly, a suburb of Sydney, New South Wales.

The marine park is located on the northern side of the North Head headland and covers an area of 17 hectares. Adjacent to the northwest is the sandy Manly Beach, a popular tourist destination with five to eight million visitors per year. To the east of the marine protected area there is also the sandy beach Shelly Beach and further east of the marine park the Shelly Beach Headland Intertidal Protected Area. A little further south is the Sydney Harbour National Park.

The aquatic reserve is a “no-take” zone, which means that no fishing may be carried out or marine animals and plants may be removed or damaged in any other way. This also includes dead organisms. Leisure activities such as swimming and diving, however, are permitted. According to the World Database on Protected Areas (WDPA), the marine park is IUCN Category II. It is managed by the New South Wales Department of Primary Industries.

== History ==
The rocky shore of Cabbage Tree Bay was designated an Intertidal Protected Area from 1993 to 2002. The marine park was designated in 2002.

== Flora and fauna ==
The Cabbage Tree Bay Aquatic Reserve encompasses various habitats in a small area, with a sandy beach to the east, a rocky shore to the south, and reefs, seagrass meadows, and kelp forests. A small colony of hard corals of the species Pocillopora aliciae was also found in the bay. These actually only occur in tropical waters, but their distribution area is shifting due to global warming.

Over 160 different species of fish and about 50 species of marine invertebrates have been reported in the marine reserve. A common fish species, for example, is Achoerodus viridis from the giant wrasse genus, which only has two species. It prefers the rocky reefs in Fairy Bower Beach and Manly Beach on the south side of the marine park. The females are brown to reddish-brown, larger ones turn into males, especially when there are no males in a group, and acquire a strong blue colour. Also found is the junker wrasse Pseudojuloides elongatus, which occurs in two non-contiguous subtropical to temperate areas in Western Australia and Japan in addition to the southwest Pacific, whereas other species of the genus Pseudojuloides are distributed in tropical areas of the Indo-Pacific. Some tropical fish species also reach the marine park via the East Australian Current. An example of this is the halterfish. It occurs in the Bay in spring to summer after traveling south along the New South Wales coast as a larva in the East Australian Current. The invertebrates found in the marine park include Goniobranchus splendidus, a species of star snail.

== See also ==
- Protected areas of New South Wales
