= Dthinna Dthinnawan National Park =

National park in Australia

Coordinates: 28°48′40″S 150°51′30″E

Dthinna Dthinnawan National Park is a national park near Yetman in northern New South Wales, Australia.

== Location ==
Dthinna Dthinnawan National Park and Dthinna Dthinnawan Nature Reserve are adjoining parks near Yetman, and about 100 km (62 mi) west Tenterfield, just north of the Bruxner Highway in northern New South Wales. Both parks are partly in the southern Brigalow Belt bioregion and partly in the Nandewar bioregion.

== History ==
Dthinna Dthinnawan National Park and Dthinna Dthinnawan Nature Reserve were reserved on 1 December 2005, the names derived from Aboriginal words 'dthinna dthinnawan' (pronounced dinna dinna-wah) meaning 'place for emu footprint'. The area had abundant food provided year-round resources for the Gamilaraay people.

== Land features ==
The topography of the park is relatively flat to undulating, with scattered hills and rocky outcrops with sandstone and granite outcrops.

== Vegetation ==
The dominant tree species are black cypress (Callitris endlicheri), white cypress (Callitris columellaris) and smooth-barked apple (Angophora costata), but eleven vegetation communities have been identified.

== Wildlife ==
Koalas, squirrel gliders (Petaurus norfolcensis) and glossy black cockatoos are found in the parks, and the threatened black-striped wallaby (Notamacropus dorsalis), zig-zag velvet gecko (Amalosia rhombifer), squatter pigeon and delicate mouse (Pseudomys delicatulus) have been sighted.

== Activities ==
There are over 70 km (43 mi) of long distance and short loop horse-riding trails in the parks.

== Invasive species ==
Feral goats, feral pigs, foxes, cats, wild dogs and rabbits have been recorded, and weeds including Coolatai grass (Hyparrhenia hirta), mother-of-millions (Kalanchoe delagoensis), prickly pear species and whisky grass (Andropogon virginicus) are present.

== See also ==
- Protected areas of New South Wales
