= Kattang Nature Reserve =

Protected area in New South Wales, Australia

- IUCN category II (national park)
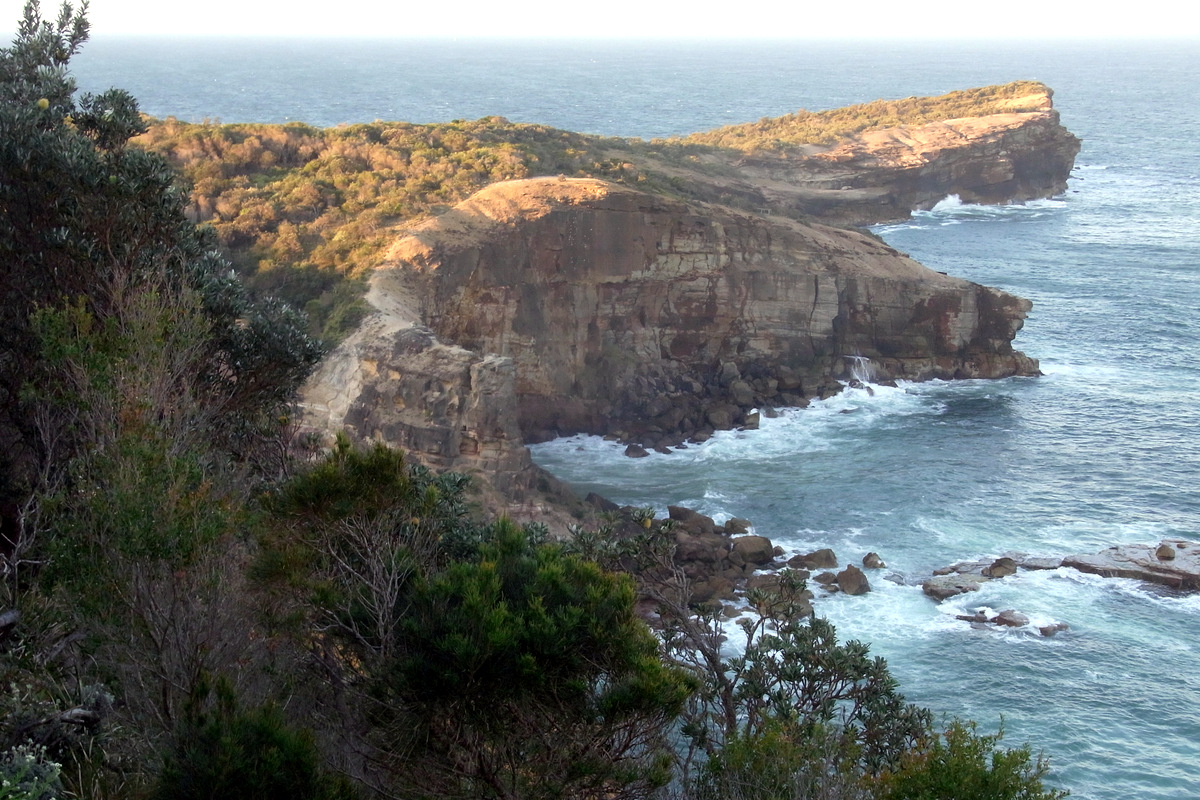
- Perpendicular Point, Kattang Nature Reserve

- Location within New South Wales
- Location: New South Wales
- Nearest city: Laurieton
- Coordinates: 31°38′28″S 152°50′54″E
- Area: 0.58 km^{2} (0.22 sq mi)
- Established: March 1984
- Governing body: NSW National Parks and Wildlife Service
- Website: Official website

The Kattang Nature Reserve is a protected nature reserve in the Mid North Coast region of New South Wales, on the eastern coast of Australia. The 68-hectare (170-acre) reserve is situated 7 kilometres (4.3 mi) from Laurieton, 47 kilometres (29 mi) south of Port Macquarie and 10 kilometres (6.2 mi) east of the Pacific Highway, near Kew.

== Features ==
The reserve has a variety of different vegetation communities, such as exposed headlands, dry eucalyptus woodland, wet and dry heathland. Two small littoral rainforest patches remain, they are floristically similar to those at Sea Acres National Park not far to the north. There is speculation that the extremely rare scented acronychia grows at Kattang. Perpendicular Point has cliffs that descend 40 metres (130 ft) suddenly to the sea below. Bushwalking is popular, particularly in late winter and early spring when the abundant wildflowers are in season.

== See also ==
- Protected areas of New South Wales
