= Lake Macquarie State Conservation Area =

Protected area in New South Wales, Australia

- IUCN category II (national park)
- Location within New South Wales Location within Australia
- Location: New South Wales, Australia
- Nearest city: City of Lake Macquarie, NSW
- Coordinates: 33.0799930°S 151.609836°E
- Area: 1,880 acres (7.6 km^{2})
- Governing body: NSW National Parks & Wildlife Service

Lake Macquarie State Conservation Area is a 761-hectare (1,880-acre) conservation area in New South Wales Australia, approximately 20 kilometres (12 mi) from Newcastle. It is made up of six separate land sections around the coastal saltwater Lake Macquarie, covering 16 kilometres (10 mi) of the lake's foreshore. Though most of the area was declared in 1996 one section, the Morisset area, was added in January 1999.

Part of the 250 km Great North Walk passes through the conservation area. The conservation area, and adjacent Pulbah Island Nature Reserve, protect some of Lake Macquarie's little remaining natural bushland, and vegetation communities that are not present elsewhere in the state's park system.

== Park sections ==
Chain Valley Bay
272 hectares (670 acres) of bushland at the lake's southern end, behind 600 metres (2,000 ft) of foreshore.

Point Wolstoncroft
A narrow peninsula on the lake's south eastern side covering 107.8 hectares (266 acres) with 6 kilometres (3.7 mi) of foreshore. This area is leased by the Department of Sport and Recreation who manage the popular Point Wolstoncroft Sport and Recreation Centre which takes up much of the southern section of the point. The centre has accommodation and sporting facilities.

Wangi Wangi Point
42.3 hectares (105 acres) of bushland on the lake's western shore with approximately 2.9 kilometres (1.8 mi)of foreshore. Within this area of the park is the Wangi Point tourist park, managed by City of Lake Macquarie.

Morisset
At the south western end of the lake Morisset encompasses 174 hectares (430 acres) around the Morisset hospital and covers 4 kilometres (2.5 mi) of the Lake's foreshore.

Myuna Bay
Covers 11 hectares (27 acres) and 1.1 kilometres (0.68 mi) of foreshore.

Awaba Bay
At the lake's northern end Awaba Bay covers 43.2 hectares (107 acres) and 1.6 kilometres (0.99 mi) of foreshore.

Wangi Wangi, Awaba Bay and Morisset all have active Landcare groups where volunteers work to control invasive weeds, and encourage regenerative growth of native species.
