= Kooraban National Park =

National park in New South Wales

- IUCN category II (national park)
- Location within New South Wales
- Location: New South Wales, Australia
- Nearest city: Cobargo
- Coordinates: 36.32°S 149.92°E
- Area: 11,626 ha (44.89 sq mi)
- Established: 1 January 2001
- Governing body: NSW National Parks & Wildlife Service

Kooraban National Park comprises more than 11,500 hectares of land between the Monaro region and the coast in New South Wales, Australia. The park is on the traditional territory of the Yuin people, and derives its name from the local word for koalas. It is designated as a category II protected area by the IUCN.

== Description ==
The 11,626 hectares (44.89 sq mi) park is bounded by the valley of the Narira Creek and the Tuross River, bordering the Monaro tablelands in the west and the Tasman Sea coast to the east. It contains four communities of important vegetation and endangered animal habitat. It comprises a significant portion of Dignams Creek's river basin. The town of Narooma lies 15 kilometres (9.3 mi) to the north-east, and Cobargo township 5 kilometres (3.1 mi) southwards.

Many of the pathways in the park follow old routes set down by the traditional inhabitants of the land, the Yuin people. The name Kooraban comes from a local Aboriginal word meaning "koala". The area was declared a national park in 2001, and there is evidence of historical woodcutting and gold mining within the park. In 2012, the park was designated a protected area by the IUCN. The park contains a small population of koalas, one of several endangered animal species the park provides habitat for; koalas are in danger of extinction in southern New South Wales. Other vulnerable animals in the park include the southern brown bandicoot, the long-nosed potoroo, and the tiger quoll, all marsupials.
