= Ngula Bulgarabang Regional Park =

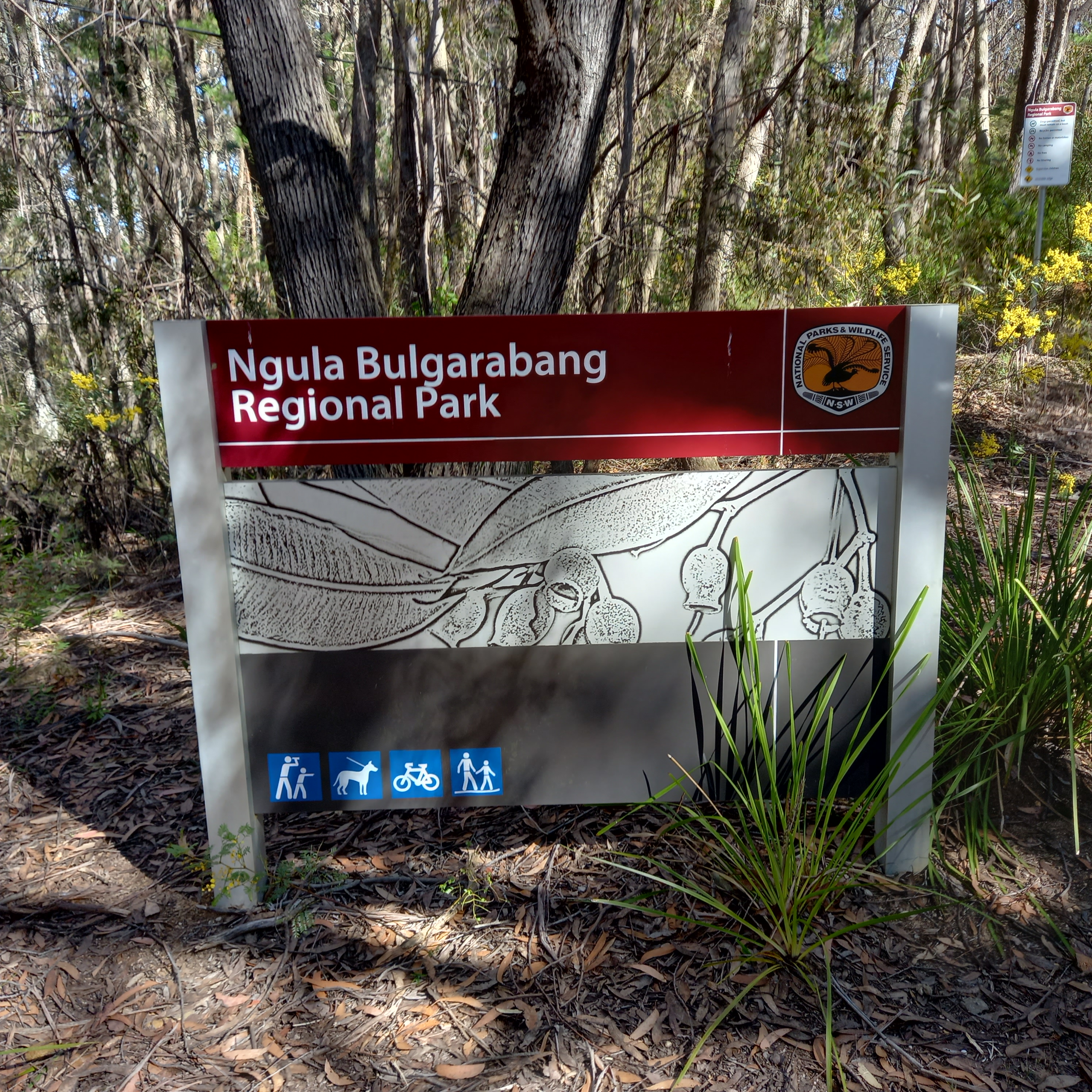
- Sign at the main entrance of Ngula Bulgarabang Regional Park

- Location within New South Wales
- Location: New South Wales
- Nearest city: Katoomba
- Coordinates: 33°42′28″S 150°16′21″E
- Established: June 2020
- Governing body: NSW National Parks and Wildlife Service
- Website: Official website

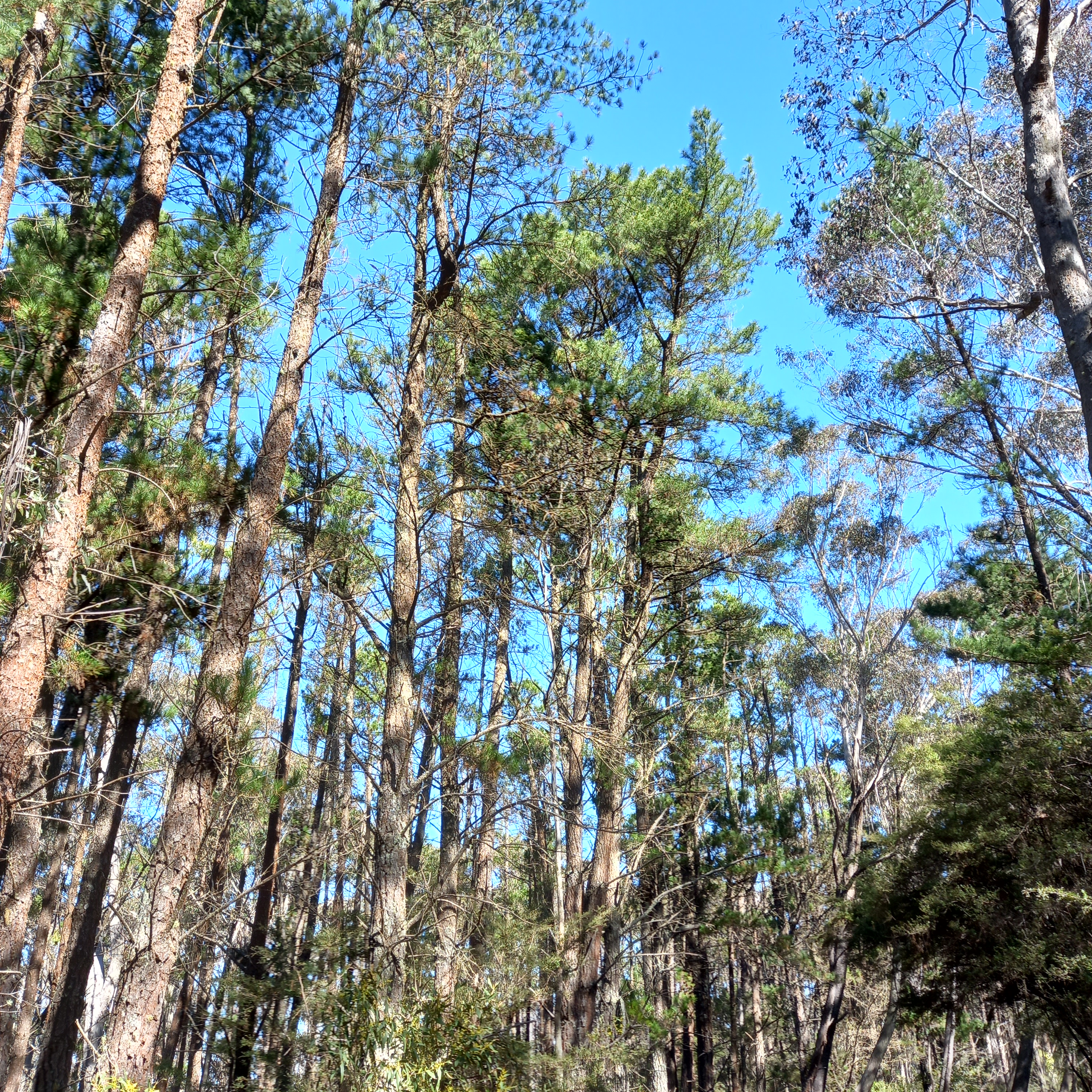
Radiata pine trees at Ngula Bulgarabang Regional Park

Ngula Bulgarabang Regional Park (colloquially Radiata Plateau) is a parcel of land on the upper Blue Mountains western escarpment, NSW, Australia. The area comprises a well-defined plateau to the west of Pulpit Hill Road, Katoomba, with an area of 756 acres of pristine natural bushland bordering the Megalong Valley and Greater Blue Mountains World Heritage Area.

The area houses several species including the spotted-tail quoll, greater glider, and flame robin, while traditional Aboriginal pathway Blacks Ladder runs through the area.

== History ==
The property was owned by the previous owners for 45 years (1974–2019) and known to them as ‘Invincibility Point’. The area, with an address listed as 28 Pulpit Hill Road, Katoomba, was last advertised in 2019 as one of the largest undeveloped escarpment properties ever offered for sale in the Upper Blue Mountains, composed of 5 lots on one title and one separate title lot of 89 hectares (220 acres).

Formerly known as Pulpit Plateau, in the 1960s the plateau was cleared for a plantation of radiata pine, hence the colloquial name. The area was officially named Ngula Bulgarabang in June 2020. The name means 'very large forest' in the Gundungurra language.

It was purchased by the NSW State Government in 2019 for $2.8 million. On 8 October 2019, NSW Environment Minister Matt Kean announced that Radiata Plateau will be incorporated into the State's national park reserve system. The park was gazetted in June 2020.
