= Ulong, New South Wales =

Town in New South Wales, Australia

Ulong
- Town
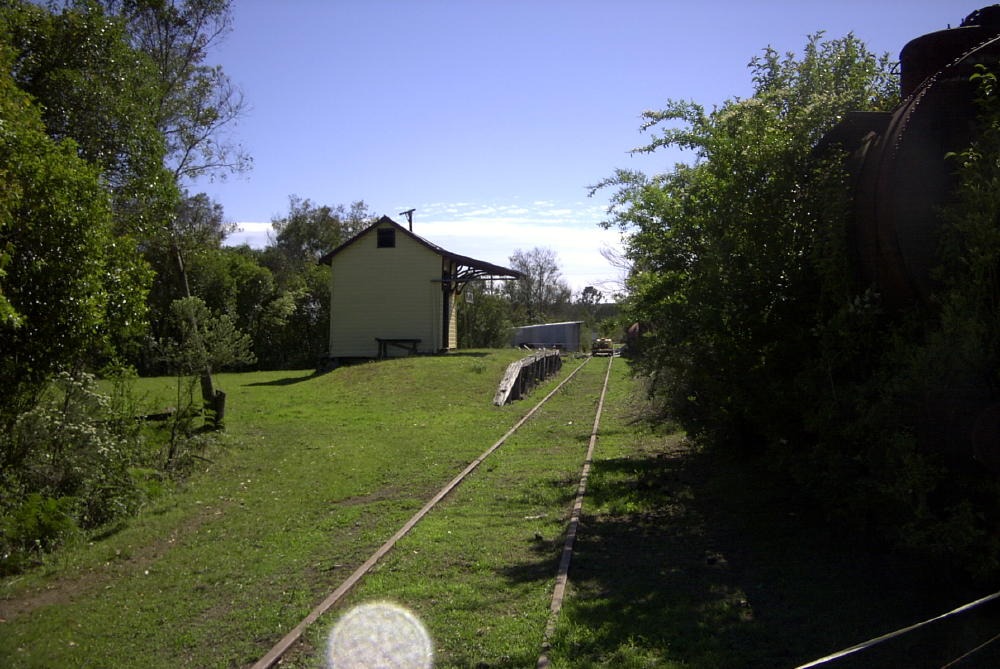
- Ulong railway station on the closed Dorrigo railway line

- Coordinates: 30°14′23″S 152°53′08″E
- Country: Australia
- State: New South Wales
- LGA: City of Coffs Harbour

Government
  - State electorate: Coffs Harbour
  - Federal division: Division of Cowper

Population
  - Total: 215 (2021 census)
- Postcode: 2450

Ulong is a small village located on the Mid North Coast region, neighbouring the Northern Tablelands, of New South Wales, Australia. It has a community hall, public school, cafe-post office and an Ex-services Club.

== Facilities ==
The village is serviced by the Ulong Ex-services Club, cafe with rural transaction centre, and the Eastern Dorrigo Community Hall. The hall has camping facilities available with kitchen, BBQ and shower facilities available

Timms Park is situated on Ulong Creek with a picnic area including tables, bins and a toilet. The land surrounding the park was donated to the community by LEH Timms.

== Geography ==
The village lies inland from Coffs Harbour by 36 kilometres (22 mi). Whilst a short distance, it takes 45 minutes to drive to, through the mountainous rainforest. Ulong is on the Eastern Dorrigo Plateau and sits some 520 metres (1,710 ft) AHD. Like the neighbouring village of Lowanna, the climate is markedly different from Coffs Harbour. Ulong is known as the "Village in the Valley".

== History ==
Once larger than Coffs Harbour, it was a centre for the timber industry. Dorrigo pine (Araucaria cunninghamii), tallowwood (Eucalyptus microcorys), blackbutt (Eucalyptus pilularis) and coachwood (Ceratopetalum apetalum) were milled extensively via the Dorrigo railway line. There was gold in the hills too. Georges Gold Mine was open on occasion as a tourist attraction before its closure in 2007

Ulong is on the road to Nymboida River and borders two of its tributaries, the Little Nymbodia and Bobo Rivers.

The Australian National series Enduro motorcycle Championships took place over two days in and around Ulong in 2007. On 9 September 2011 a special stage of the World Rally Championship was held in the area. These events make use of the roads within the extensive array of State and National parks in the area.

== Population ==
At the 2006 census, Ulong had a population of 131 people. By 2016, the population increased to 233.

Home of iconic actor Jack Thompson.

== Climate ==
The region surrounding Ulong, especially the higher area, has a Subtropical highland climate (Cfb) with warm, humid and wet summers and cool winters with frosty nights.

Climate data for Bobo Nursery
Month	Jan	Feb	Mar	Apr	May	Jun	Jul	Aug	Sep	Oct	Nov	Dec	Year
Mean daily maximum °C (°F)	26.2 (79.2)	25.7 (78.3)	24.6 (76.3)	21.8 (71.2)	19.1 (66.4)	17.1 (62.8)	16.5 (61.7)	17.5 (63.5)	20.5 (68.9)	22.8 (73.0)	25.1 (77.2)	26.6 (79.9)	15.1 (59.2)
Mean daily minimum °C (°F)	15.3 (59.5)	13.9 (57.0)	9.4 (48.9)	5.3 (41.5)	2.2 (36.0)	0.6 (33.1)	2.2 (36.0)	4.4 (39.9)	8.7 (47.7)	11.4 (52.5)	13.7 (56.7)	13.7 (56.7)	8.5 (47.3)
Average precipitation mm (inches)	207.2 (8.16)	222.0 (8.74)	258.0 (10.16)	142.7 (5.62)	100.1 (3.94)	110.0 (4.33)	97.4 (3.83)	87.5 (3.44)	66.1 (2.60)	99.1 (3.90)	128.4 (5.06)	169.5 (6.67)	1,667.6 (65.65)
Average precipitation days	14.5	15.3	16.3	13.2	9.0	8.1	6.5	7.1	7.8	10.7	11.4	13.5	133.4
Average relative humidity (%)	66	69	71	65	66	61	55	53	50	56	60	61	61
