= Nymboida =

Nymboida is a village in New South Wales, Australia.

It may also refer to other subjects in the area:

- Nymboida National Park
- Nymboida River
- Nymboida Power Station
- Nymboida Shire; a now defunct local government area.
