= Urumbilum River =

Coordinates: 30°17′S 152°57′E

Location
- Country: Australia
- State: New South Wales
- IBRA: NSW North Coast
- District: Northern Tablelands, Northern Rivers
- Local government area: Coffs Harbour

Physical characteristics
- Source: Dorrigo Plateau, Great Dividing Range
  - location: east of Dorrigo in Bindarri National Park
  - elevation: 593 m (1,946 ft)
- Mouth: confluence with Orara River
  - location: northwest of Upper Orara
  - elevation: 115 m (377 ft)
- Length: 14 km (8.7 mi)

Basin features
- River system: Clarence River catchment
- National park: Bindarri National Park

Urumbilum River, a perennial stream of the Clarence River catchment, is located in the Northern Tablelands and Northern Rivers districts of New South Wales, Australia.

== Course and features ==
Urumbilum River rises on the eastern slopes of the Dorrigo Plateau, Great Dividing Range, east of Dorrigo in Bindarri National Park, and flows generally northeast and east, before reaching its confluence with the Orara River, northwest of Upper Orara. The river descends 478 metres (1,568 ft) over its 14 kilometres (8.7 mi) course; and flows through the Bindarri National Park in its upper reaches.

== See also ==
- Rivers of New South Wales
