= Little Nymboida River =

Coordinates: 30°04′S 152°45′E

Location
- Country: Australia
- State: New South Wales
- Region: NSW North Coast (IBRA), Northern Rivers, Northern Tablelands
- Municipalities: Coffs Harbour, Clarence Valley, Guyra

Physical characteristics
- Source: Bushmans Range, Great Dividing Range
  - location: east of Ulong, south of Lowanna
  - elevation: 576 m (1,890 ft)
- Mouth: confluence with the Nymboida River
  - location: west of Black Mountain
  - elevation: 248 m (814 ft)
- Length: 44 km (27 mi)

Basin features
- River system: Clarence River catchment
- Tributaries
  - left: Bobo River
  - right: Mole Creek (New South Wales)
- National parks: Bindarri NP, Nymboi-Binderay NP

Little Nymboida River, a perennial stream of the Clarence River catchment, is located in the Northern Rivers and Northern Tablelands districts of New South Wales, Australia. It flows through the village of Lowanna.

== Course and features ==
Little Nymboida River rises on the western slopes of Bushmans Range, on the slopes of the Great Dividing Range, east of Ulong, near Lowanna. The river flows in a meandering course generally north then southwest then northwest, joined by two tributaries including the Bobo River, before reaching its confluence with the Nymboida River, west of Black Mountain, within the Nymboida National Park. The river descends 327 metres (1,073 ft) over its 44 kilometres (27 mi) course.

== See also ==
- Rivers of New South Wales
