= Dangar =

Dangar may refer to:

- Armorhide: a character of Transformers
- Dangar Falls: a waterfall near Dorrigo, New South Wales
- Dangars Falls: a waterfall near Dangarsleigh, New South Wales
- Dangar Island: an island of Australia
- Dangar's Lagoon: a waterhole beside Thunderbolts Way, near Uralla, New South Wales
- Mount Dangar: a mountain in the Goulburn River National Park, near Denman, New South Wales
- A food preparation from the state of Maharashtra in Western India

== People with the surname ==
- Henry Dangar (1796–1861), surveyor and explorer of Australia
- Shraddha Dangar (born 1994), Indian actress and model
