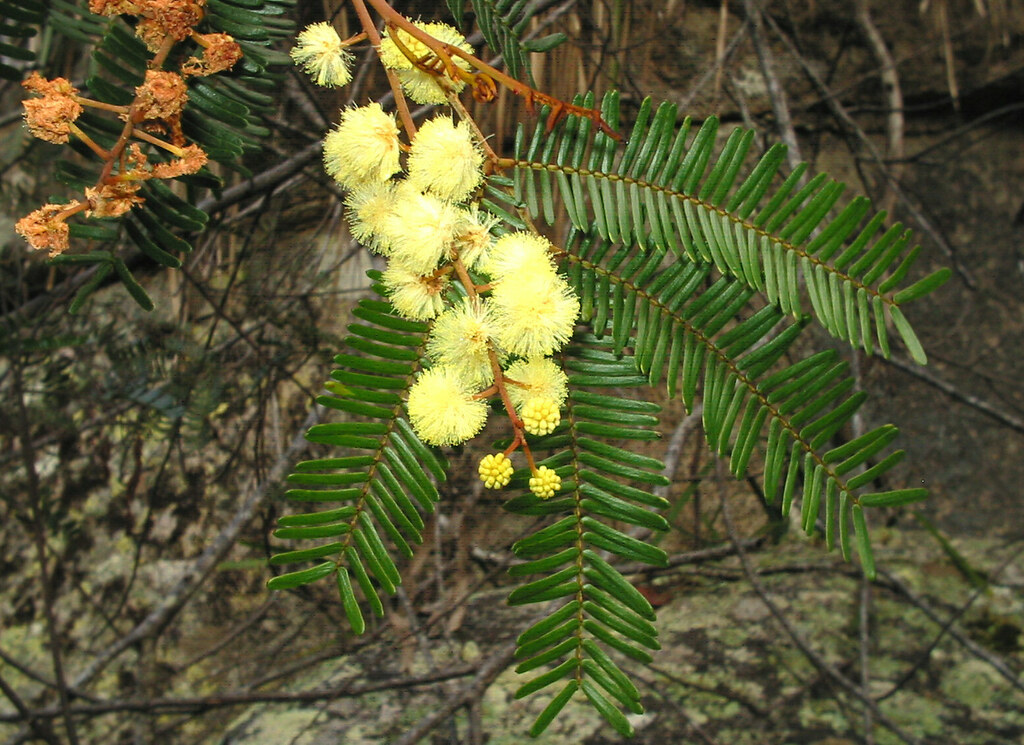
- In the Gibraltar Range

Conservation status
- Endangered (IUCN 3.1)

Scientific classification
- Kingdom: Plantae
- Clade: Tracheophytes
- Clade: Angiosperms
- Clade: Eudicots
- Clade: Rosids
- Order: Fabales
- Family: Fabaceae
- Subfamily: Caesalpinioideae
- Clade: Mimosoid clade
- Genus: Acacia
- Species: A. cangaiensis

Binomial name
- Acacia cangaiensis Tindale & Kodela
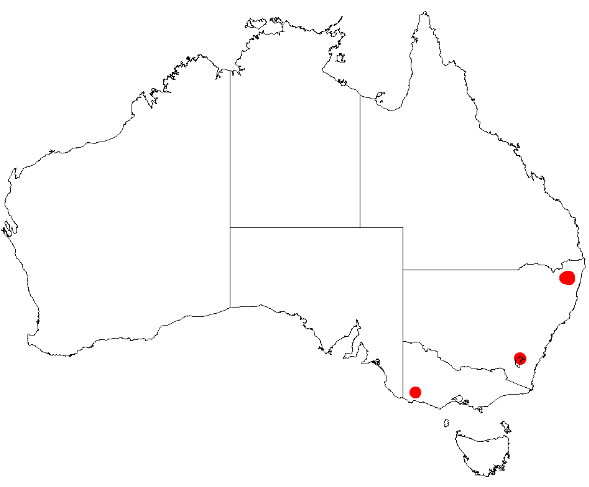
- Occurrence data from AVH

Synonyms
- Racosperma cangaiense (Tindale & Kodela) Pedley

= Acacia cangaiensis =

Species of legume

Acacia cangaiensis is a species of flowering plant in the family Fabaceae and is endemic to the a restricted area of New South Wales, Australia. It is a shrub or tree with dark brown bark, leathery bipinnate leaves, spherical heads of pale or bright yellow flowers, and curved or twisted, leathery pods.

== Description ==
Acacia cangaiensis is a tree or shrub that typically grows to a height of 2 to 6 metres (7 to 20 ft). The bark is dark brown and smooth or finely fissured. The branchlets are terete and covered with white or pale yellow hairs pressed against the surface. The leaves are bipinnate with usually 2 to 6 pairs of pinnae on a rachis 10–60 mm (0.39–2.36 in) long, the leaflets further divided with 12 to 35 narrowly oblong to linear pinnules. There are glands at the base of the lowest pinnae and most, or all pairs of pinnules. The flowers are borne in 7 to 25 spherical heads in axils in racemes 40–130 mm (1.6–5.1 in) long on a peduncle 5–11 mm (0.20–0.43 in) long. Each head is 5–7 mm (0.20–0.28 in) in diameter and contains 24 to 43 pale or bright yellow flowers. Flowering occurs from January to March, and the pods are leathery, straight to curved and often twisted 20–140 mm (0.79–5.51 in) long and 9–12 mm (0.35–0.47 in) wide.

== Taxonomy ==
Acacia cangaiensis was first formally described in 1991 by the botanists Mary Tindale and Phillip Kodela in Australian Systematic Botany from specimens collected by Alex Flloyd near the junction of the Mann and Nymboida Rivers in 1981. The specific epithet (cangaiensis) refers to the Cangai State Forest, where this species was first collected.

== Distribution and habitat ==
This species of wattle grows in dry sclerophyll forest communities on rocky slopes and ridges and has a limited distribution in the Gibraltar Range and Nymboida National Parks, including the Cangai State Forest, in a restricted part of northern New South Wales.

== See also ==
- List of Acacia species
