= Little Murray River (Nymboida) =

Tributary of the Nymboida River, New South Wales, Australia

Coordinates: 30°20′S 152°37′E

Location
- Country: Australia
- State: New South Wales
- IBRA: NSW North Coast
- District: Northern Tablelands
- Municipalities: Coffs Harbour, Clarence Valley

Physical characteristics
- Source: Barren Mountain, Great Dividing Range
  - location: Little Murray Trigonometrical Station, in Bellinger River National Park
  - elevation: 1,190 m (3,900 ft)
- Mouth: confluence with the Nymboida River
  - location: east of Bostobrick
  - elevation: 553 m (1,814 ft)
- Length: 31 km (19 mi)

Basin features
- River system: Clarence River catchment
- National park: Bellinger River NP

Little Murray River, a perennial stream of the Clarence River catchment, is located in the Northern Tablelands district of New South Wales, Australia.

== Course and features ==
Little Murray River rises at Little Murray Trigonometrical Station, on the slopes of the Great Dividing Range, within Bellinger River National Park. The river flows generally northeast and north, joined by one minor tributary, before reaching its confluence with the Nymboida River, east of Bostobrick. The river descends 634 metres (2,080 ft) over its 31 kilometres (19 mi) course.

== See also ==
- Rivers of New South Wales
