= Orara River =

Coordinates: 29°37′S 152°50′E

Orara River Wooworra River
- Etymology: Aboriginal: derived from Urara meaning "where the perch live"

Location
- Country: Australia
- State: New South Wales
- IBRA: NSW North Coast
- District: Northern Rivers
- local government area: Clarence Valley

Physical characteristics
- Source: Dorrigo Plateau, Great Dividing Range
  - location: east of Dorrigo and west of Boambee
  - elevation: 200 m (660 ft)
- Mouth: confluence with Clarence River
  - location: southeast of Copmanhurst
  - elevation: 5 m (16 ft)
- Length: 156 km (97 mi)

Basin features
- River system: Clarence River catchment
- Tributaries
  - left: Urumbilum River, Nana Creek, Tallawudjah Creek, Coldwater Creek (New South Wales), Kangaroo River, Chambigne Creek, Lurcocks Creek
- National park: Dorrigo National Park

Orara River, a perennial stream of the Clarence River catchment, is located in the Northern Rivers district of New South Wales, Australia.

== Course and features ==
Orara River rises on the eastern slopes of the Dorrigo Plateau, Great Dividing Range, east of Dorrigo and west of Boambee, and flows in a meandering course generally north east north and north-west, joined by six tributaries including Urumbilum River and Kangaroo River, before reaching its confluence with the Clarence River, southeast of Copmanhurst. The river descends 195 metres (640 ft) over its 156 kilometres (97 mi) course; and flows through the Dorrigo National Park in its upper reaches.

Major communities along the river include Coramba, Nana Glen, Glenreagh, Coutts Crossing, Ramornie, and Eatonville.

In recent years, the river has suffered from overuse, particularly due to irrigation projects and the river's use as the major source of water for the city of Coffs Harbour. This has led to siltation in the river, and the virtual decimation of the river's freshwater fish stocks.

The name of the river is believed to be derived from Urara, an Aboriginal phrase meaning "where the perch live".

== See also ==
- Rivers of New South Wales
