= Dangar Falls =

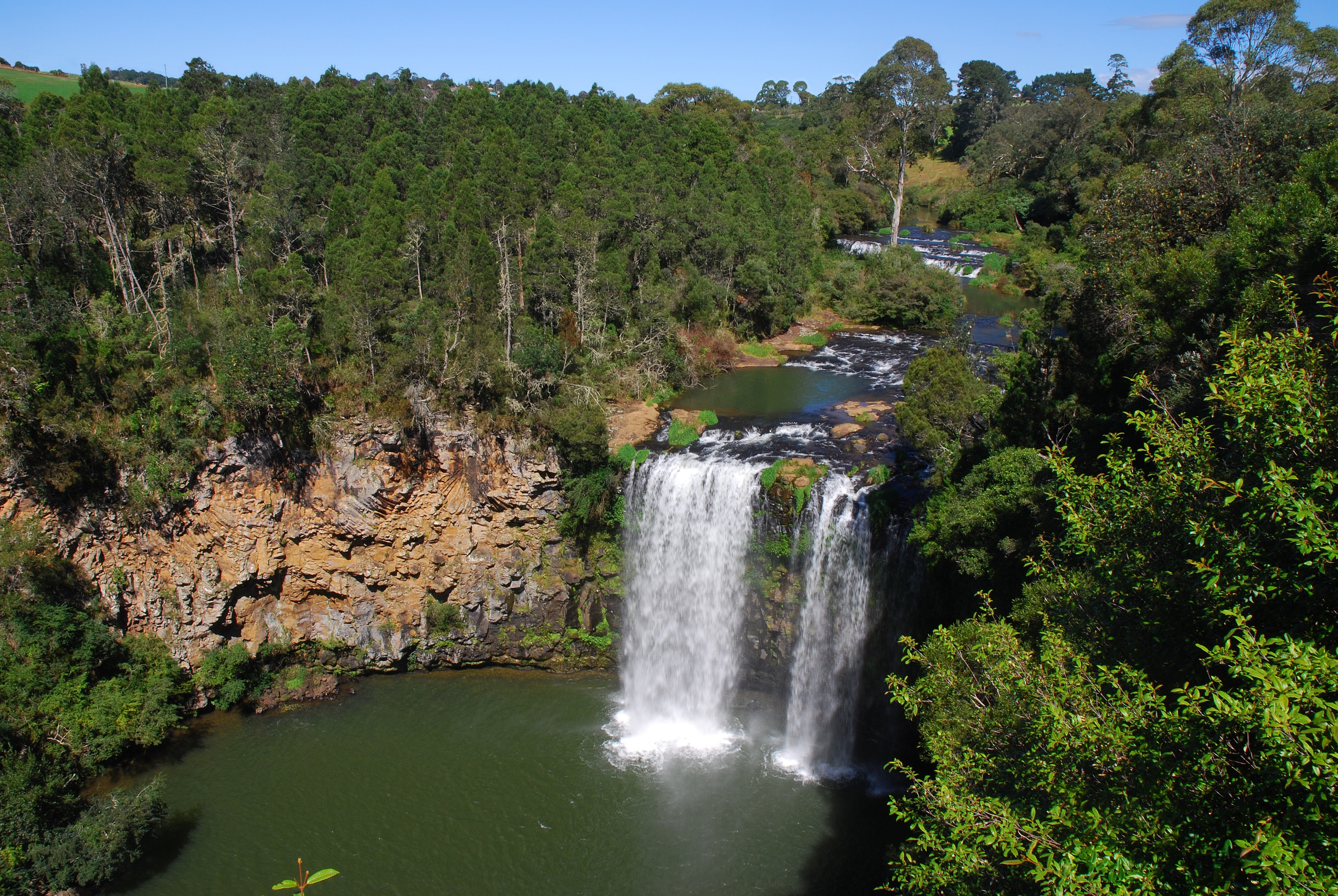
- Dangar Falls, near Dorrigo.

- Location within New South Wales
- Location: New England, New South Wales, Australia
- Coordinates: 30°19′24″S 152°42′52″E
- Type: Cascade
- Watercourse: Bielsdown River

The Dangar Falls is a cascade waterfall located across the Bielsdown River about 1.2 km (0.7 mi) north of Dorrigo in the New England region of New South Wales, Australia. The falls are small, picturesque, and are a popular photographic subject. For a short time after rain, they are quite spectacular. There is an attractive picnic spot which offers excellent views. It is possible to climb down the banks and walk along the river below the water falls.

In the past, the waterhole has been the scene of several tragic accidents. Despite warning signs from the local council, the 30-metre high falls remain a popular jumping spot for tourists. In 2012, a 19-year-old German tourist died after jumping from the falls with her friends. In January 2024, a man died after jumping from the top of the falls.

== See also ==
- List of waterfalls
- List of waterfalls in Australia
