= Boundary Creek (Nymboida River, Clarence Valley) =

Coordinates: 31°04′46″S 152°33′31″E

Location
- Country: Australia
- State: New South Wales
- Region: NSW North Coast (IBRA), Northern Rivers
- Local government area: Clarence Valley

Physical characteristics
- Source: Sheas Nob
  - location: Chaelundi National Park
- Mouth: confluence with the Nymboida River
  - location: near Nymboida
- Length: 24 km (15 mi)

Basin features
- River system: Clarence River catchment
- National park: Chaelundi NP

The Boundary Creek, a perennial stream of the Clarence River catchment, is located in the Northern Rivers region of New South Wales, Australia.

== Course and features ==
Boundary Creek rises about 4 kilometres (2.5 mi) west by south of Sheas Nob within the Chaelundi National Park. The river flows generally north and northeast before reaching its confluence with the Nymboida River, near the locality of Nymboida.

== See also ==
- Rivers of New South Wales
- List of rivers of New South Wales (A-K)
- List of rivers of Australia
- Chaelundi National Park
