= Bostobrick, New South Wales =

Village in New South Wales, Australia

Coordinates: 30.2740°S 152.6285°E

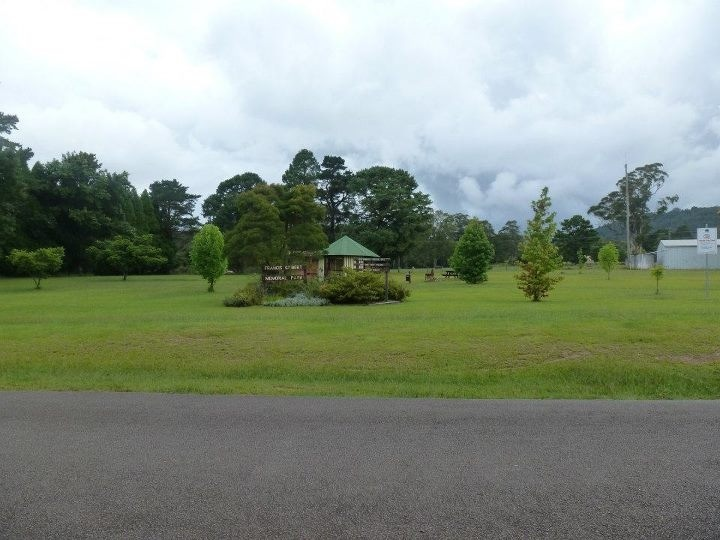
Francis Gilbert Memorial Park, located in the centre of the village.

Bostobrick is a village located on Tyringham Road in northern New South Wales, Australia. As of 2016, it has a population of 136. Bostobrick was first settled in 1857, when cedar loggers came to harvest the timber in what was then known as 'Bostobrick Scrub'.

Approximately 14 kilometres (8.7 mi) north of Dorrigo, Bostobrick is located on the Dorrigo Plateau within the Bellingen Shire. It receives an annual rainfall of 1,451 mm (57.1 in) per year, and is at an elevation of 701 m (2,300 ft) above sea level.
