= Dorrigo Plateau =

Area of Australia

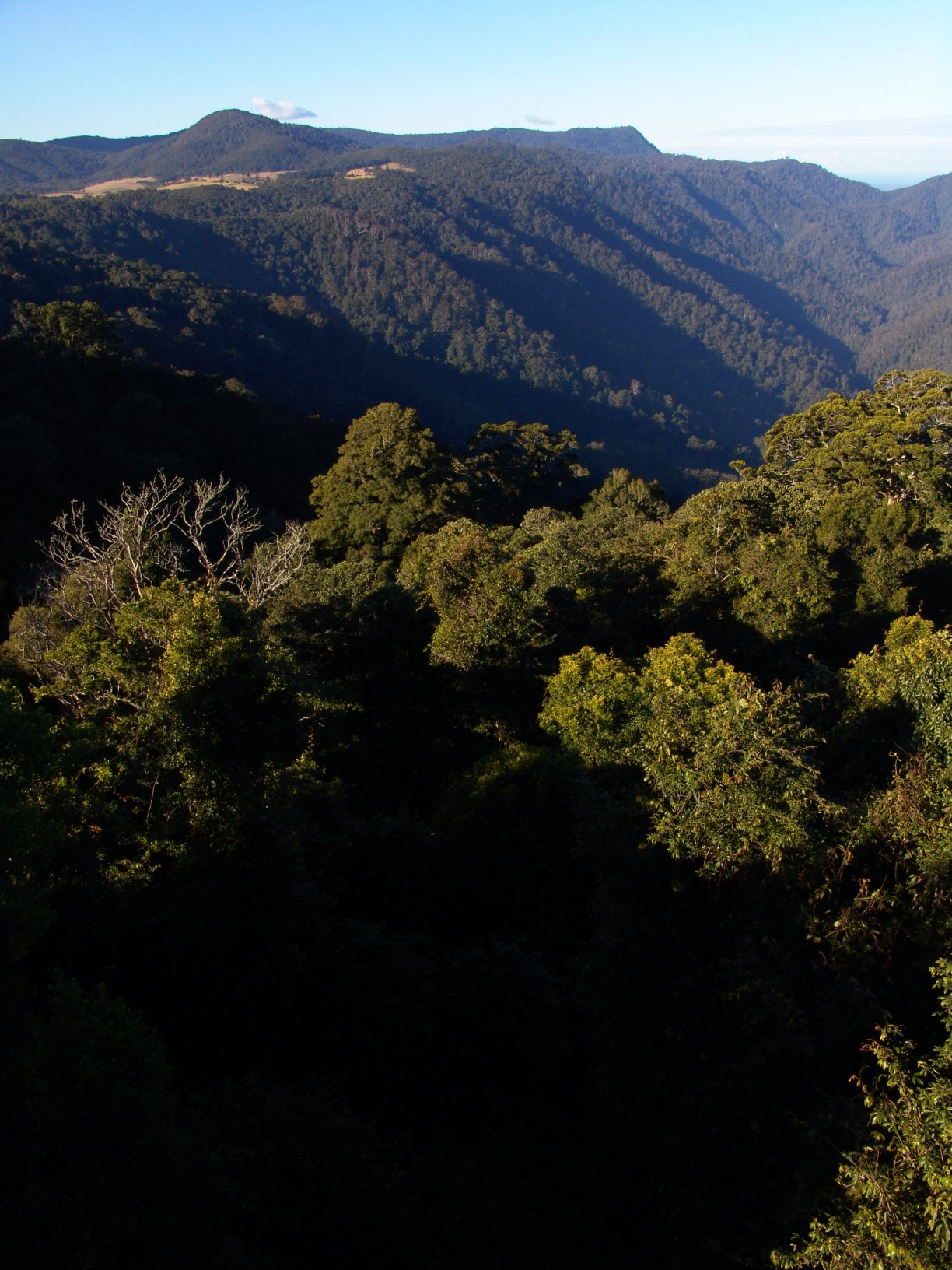
- The plateau drops into steep valleys in the Dorrigo National Park.

Highest point
- Peak: Barren Mountain
- Elevation: 1,437 m (4,715 ft)
- Coordinates: 30°23′46″S 152°29′49″E

Geography
- Location within New South Wales
- Country: Australia
- Province: New South Wales
- Regions: Northern Tablelands and New England
- Borders on: Great Dividing Range

The Dorrigo Plateau is a plateau in the Northern Tablelands and New England regions of New South Wales, Australia. The plateau forms part of the Great Dividing Range and is sometimes referred to as the Dorrigo and Guy Fawkes Plateau.

The highest peak on the plateau is Barren Mountain, at an elevation of 1,437 metres (4,715 ft) AHD.

== Location and features ==
The plateau is defined by that area bounded in the south by the Dorrigo Escarpment, in the west by the New England Tableland, in the north by Hyland State Forest, Blicks River, Glen Fernaigh Creek and Nymboida River, and in the east by Bielsdown River up to the junction with Mathews Creek, then up to the head of Mathews Creek, then by the watershed extending generally south southeast to Dome Mountain.

Located on the eastern edge of the plateau is the town of Dorrigo, 580 kilometres (360 mi) north of the Sydney and 60 kilometres (37 mi) from the coastal city of Coffs Harbour.

Richard Craig was the first European to arrive at the plateau, following the traditional indigenous route to Armidale from the Grafton area. Using his skills as a horseman, Craig travelled along the western side of the Nymboida River. Craig's track became a road, now roughly following the same path as the present Grafton to Armidale Road and travelling through the present day villages of Nymboida, Billy's Creek, Dundurrabin, Tyringham and Ebor, the latter with an elevation of 1,300 metres (4,300 ft) AHD. Timbergetters followed Craig through the sub tropical rainforest and many sawmills grew due to demand for timber, initially the highly prized Australian red cedar (Toona australis).

Today, the main access road traversing the plateau from east to west is the Waterfall Way.

The Dorrigo Plateau and surrounding Guy Fawkes River National Park area was created by successive basaltic lava flows from the Ebor Volcano covering the original granite base. Weathering from high rainfall caused an escarpment to form as the more ancient rocks underneath remained intact.

== See also ==
- Bellinger River National Park
- Bielsdown River
- Bindarri National Park
- Dorrigo National Park
- Junuy Juluum National Park
- New England National Park
