= Clouds Creek =

Location
- Country: Australia
- State: New South Wales
- Region: New England Tablelands (IBRA), Northern Tablelands
- Local government area: Clarence Valley

Physical characteristics
- Source: Great Dividing Range
  - location: near Sheas Nob, Ellis State Forest
  - elevation: 749 m (2,457 ft)
- Mouth: confluence with the Nymboida River
  - location: Benabar, south of Nymboida
  - elevation: 193 m (633 ft)
- Length: 40 km (25 mi)

Basin features
- River system: Clarence River catchment

The Clouds Creek, a perennial stream that is part of the Clarence River catchment, is located in the Northern Tablelands region of New South Wales, Australia.

== Course and features ==
Clouds Creek rises in the Ellis State Forest, about 8.8 kilometres (5.5 mi) west southwest of Sheas Nob, within the Great Dividing Range, south southwest of Grafton. The river flows generally to the east then north before reaching its confluence with the Nymboida River at Benabar, a locality on the Armidale Road, 8 kilometres (5.0 mi) south of Nymboida. The river descends 56 metres (184 ft) over its 42 kilometres (26 mi) course, including descending over Clouds Creek Falls about 2,400 metres (7,900 ft) northwest of Kurrajong Spur.

== See also ==
- Rivers of New South Wales
- List of rivers of New South Wales (A-K)
- List of rivers of Australia
