= Nymboi-Binderay National Park =

National park in New South Wales, Australia

- IUCN category II (national park)
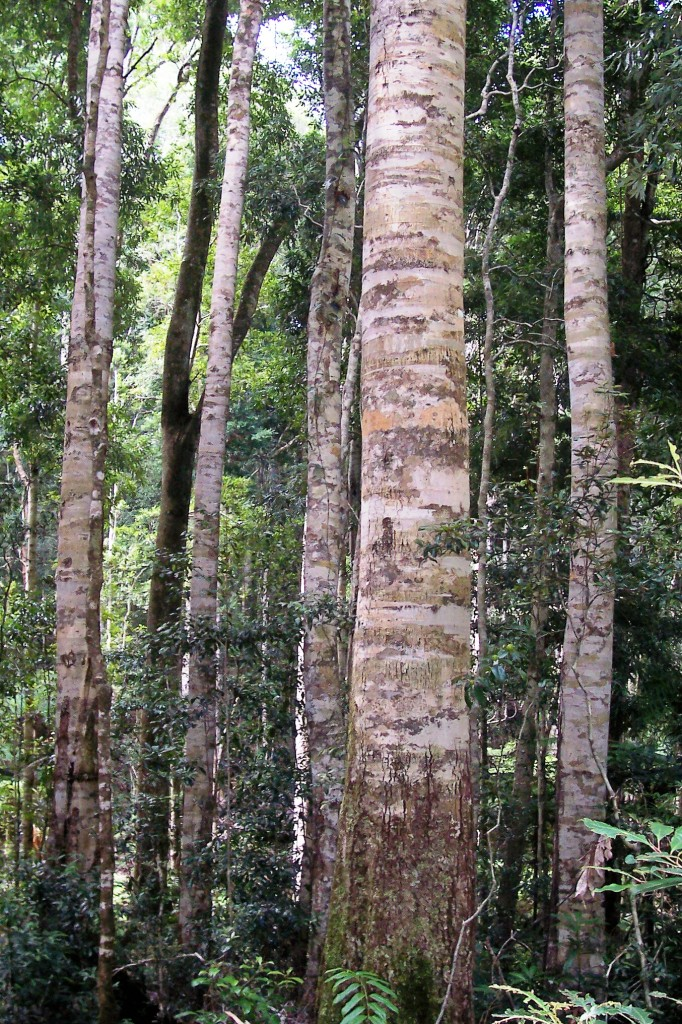
- Coachwood at Nymboi-Binderay National Park

- Location within New South Wales
- Location: New South Wales
- Nearest city: Dorrigo
- Coordinates: 30°06′31″S 152°43′55″E
- Area: 172.43 km^{2} (66.58 sq mi)
- Established: 1997
- Governing body: NSW National Parks & Wildlife Service
- Website: Official website

Nymboi-Binderay is a national park located in New South Wales, Australia, 444 kilometres (276 mi) north of Sydney. It is located north of the town of Dorrigo.

This park surrounds the granite gorges and banks of the rugged Nymboida River. The Nymboida rapids are used by white water rafters. The park also contains sections of the Little Nymboida River and recreational areas at Cod Hole and The Junction. Rainforest and extensive old-growth forest provide habitat for a variety of threatened fauna, including 68 species of mammals, 33 species of reptiles, 25 species of amphibians and over 120 species of birds.

It includes patches of the rare Dorrigo white gum.

== See also ==
- Protected areas of New South Wales
- High Conservation Value Old Growth forest
