= Kangaroo River (Clarence Valley) =

Coordinates: 28°39′S 152°16′E

Kangaroo River Kangaroo Creek

Location
- Country: Australia
- State: New South Wales
- Region: New England Tablelands (IBRA), Northern Tablelands
- local government area: Clarence Valley

Physical characteristics
- Source: Great Dividing Range
  - location: near Moleton, southwest of Glenreagh
  - elevation: 368 m (1,207 ft)
- Mouth: confluence with Orara River
  - location: southeast of Coutts Crossing
  - elevation: 34 m (112 ft)
- Length: 51 km (32 mi)

Basin features
- River system: Clarence River catchment
- Tributaries
  - right: Towallum River
- National park: Nymboida National Park

Kangaroo River, a watercourse of the Clarence River catchment, is located in the Northern Tablelands district of New South Wales, Australia.

== Course and features ==
Kangaroo River rises on the slopes of the Great Dividing Range, near Moleton, southwest of Glenreagh, and flows generally north by west and then north by east, joined by the Towallum River before forming its confluence with the Orara River, southeast of Coutts Crossing. The river descends 334 metres (1,096 ft) over its 51 kilometres (32 mi) course; and flows through the Nymboida National Park in its upper reaches.

== See also ==
- Rivers of New South Wales
