= Bobo River =

Bobo River Bobo Creek

Location
- Country: Australia
- State: New South Wales
- IBRA: NSW North Coast
- District: Northern Tablelands
- Municipalities: Coffs Harbour, Clarence Valley, Guyra

Physical characteristics
- Source: Mount Wondurrigah, Great Dividing Range
  - location: near Tallowood Point
  - coordinates: 30.32751°S 152.91753°E
  - elevation: 679 m (2,228 ft)
- Mouth: confluence with the Little Nymboida River
  - location: near Moleton
  - coordinates: 30.12567°S 152.80810°E
  - elevation: 340 m (1,120 ft)
- Length: 44 km (27 mi)

Basin features
- River system: Clarence River catchment
- National parks: Dorrigo NP, Cascade NP

Bobo River, a mostly perennial stream of the Clarence River catchment, is located in the Northern Tablelands district of New South Wales, Australia.

== Course and features ==
Bobo River rises on the western slopes of Mount Wondurrigah, within the Great Dividing Range, near Tallwood Point. The river flows generally northwest and north, before reaching its confluence with the Little Nymboida River, near Moleton, within the Cascade National Park. The river descends 339 metres (1,112 ft) over its 39-kilometre (24 mi) course.

== See also ==
- Rivers of New South Wales
