= Towallum River =

Coordinates: 30°03′S 152°54′E

Towallum River Towallum Creek, Back Creek

Location
- Country: Australia
- State: New South Wales
- Region: New England Tablelands (IBRA), Northern Tablelands
- Local government area: Clarence Valley

Physical characteristics
- Source: Great Dividing Range
  - location: near Moleton, northwest of Coramba
  - elevation: 480 m (1,570 ft)
- Mouth: confluence with Kangaroo River
  - location: below Koukandowie Mountain
- Length: 23 km (14 mi)

Basin features
- River system: Clarence River catchment

Towallum River, a perennial river of the Clarence River catchment, is located in the Northern Tablelands region of New South Wales, Australia.

== Course and features ==
Towallum River rises on the slopes of the Great Dividing Range near Moleton, northwest of Coramba, and flows generally north and northwest before reaching its confluence with the Kangaroo River, below Koukandowie Mountain; over its 23 kilometres (14 mi) course.

== See also ==
- Rivers of New South Wales
- List of rivers of Australia
- List of rivers of New South Wales (L–Z)
