= Barren Mountain =

Mountain in New South Wales, Australia

- Location within New South Wales

Highest point
- Elevation: 1,437 m (4,715 ft)
- Coordinates: 30°23′46″S 152°29′49″E

Geography
- Location: New South Wales, Australia
- Parent range: Dorrigo Plateau

Climbing
- Easiest route: Waterfall Way

Barren Mountain is a mountain standing approximately 1,437 metres (4,715 ft) AHD, situated as one of the highest points on the Dorrigo Plateau, that is part of the Great Dividing Range, located in the Northern Tablelands and New England regions of New South Wales, Australia.

The mountain is located within the New England National Park and is situated 7 kilometres (4.3 mi) east northeast of Majors Point Trigonometric Station and about 7 kilometres (4.3 mi) north of the junction of Andersons and Cooks Creeks.

The nearest settlement, Dorrigo, is located 21.7 kilometres (13.5 mi) away to the east. The nearest sealed road is the Waterfall Way, located 3.3 kilometres (2.1 mi) to the north.

The area has given a name to a type of tree, Barren Mountain mallee (Eucalyptus approximans), which is abundant in the vicinity, however, has been assessed as a vulnerable and threatened species in the remainder of New South Wales.
