= Nymboida Power Station =

Coordinates: 29.9257°S 152.7418°E

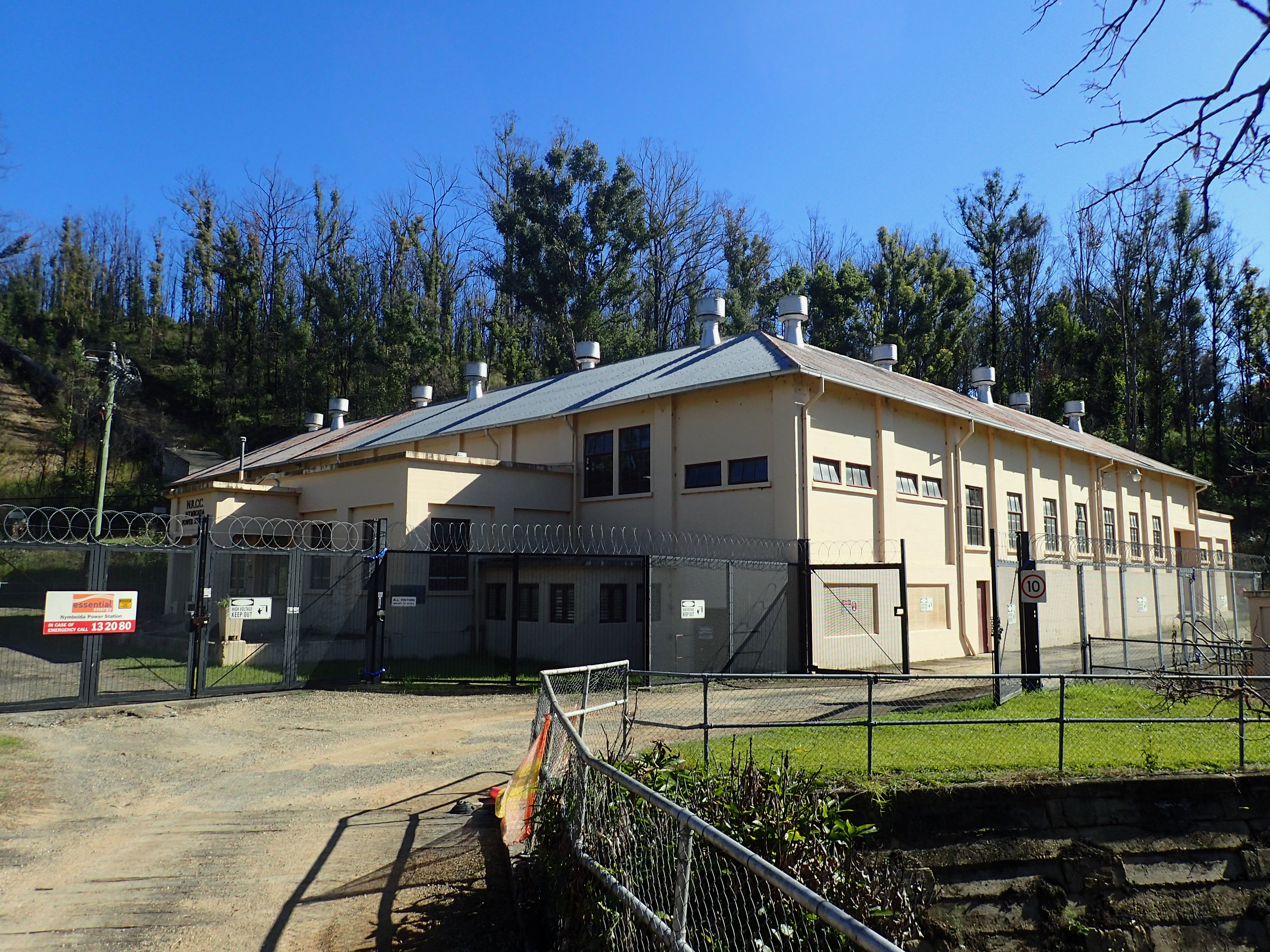
Nymboida Power Station

Nymboida Power Station is a hydroelectric power station located at Nymboida, New South Wales, Australia. Nymboida has seven generators, with a generating capacity of 5 megawatts (6,700 hp) of electricity.

The power station was built by Clarence River County Council between 1924 and 1926. The power station is listed as operational List of active power stations in New South Wales however output is dependent on river flows.

The power station takes water from the Nymboida River and returns it to Goolang Creek. The increased unnatural flow created from the station flow has created significant damage to the creek, lowering the level of the creek over the 80+ years of operation. The flow, however, has created an additional feature as the water flow is used as a canoeing venue.

The power station has been closed since 2013 when a major flood damaged the no. 2 tunnel headwall & two of the three pipelines associated with the powerstation. It was decided that it was not economically viable to make the necessary repairs to the infrastructure so the station ceased operation. ==Notes==
