= Blicks River =

Coordinates: 30°11′S 152°41′E

Blicks River Main Water Creek

Location
- Country: Australia
- State: New South Wales
- IBRA: New England Tablelands
- District: Northern Tablelands
- Municipality: Clarence Valley

Physical characteristics
- Source: Majors Point, Great Dividing Range
- Source confluence: Majors Creek and Little Falls Creek
  - location: east of Ebor
  - elevation: 1,340 m (4,400 ft)
- Mouth: confluence with the Nymboida River
  - location: north of Dorrigo
  - elevation: 419 m (1,375 ft)
- Length: 67 km (42 mi)

Basin features
- River system: Clarence River catchment

Blicks River, a perennial stream that is part of the Clarence River catchment, is located in the Northern Tablelands district of New South Wales, Australia.

== Course and features ==
Blicks River is formed through the confluence of Majors Creek and Little Falls Creek, below Majors Point, within the Great Dividing Range, northeast of the village of Ebor. The river flows generally north, east by north, and then east, reaching its confluence with the Nymboida River, north of Dorrigo. The river descends 921 metres (3,022 ft) over its 67 kilometres (42 mi) course.

== See also ==
- Rivers of New South Wales
