= Don Dorrigo Gazette =

Newspaper in Dorrigo, New South Wales

Front page of The Don Dorrigo Gazette and Guy Fawkes Advocate, 8 January 1910

The Don Dorrigo Gazette, previously published as the Don Dorrigo Gazette and Guy Fawkes Advocate, was a weekly English language newspaper published in Dorrigo, New South Wales, Australia.

== History ==
The newspaper was established as the Don Dorrigo and Guy Fawkes Advocate on 8 January 1910 by brothers Roy and Reginald Vincent.

In July 2023, the Gazette's owners, Michael and Jade English, announced the closure of the paper. Financial costs, health reasons and increased competition from social media were cited as contributing factors in the paper's demise.

== Production ==
The paper was printed on a Heidelberg Zylinder Automat press and was the last known newspaper in Australia to be produced by a hot-metal typesetting. Its editors as of 2015 were Michael and Jade English who in around 2006, took over from Michael's father John who had been working for the newspaper since 1961.

Since 2006, circulation had dropped from 1,000 copies per week to a low around 300. As of early 2023, circulation was approximately 500 copies per week.

== Quotes ==
Articles from the Gazette have been quoted in other regional newspapers:

- "The Only Hope". Daily Observer (Tamworth, NSW : 1917 – 1920), 8 May 1920, p. 1.
- "Capitalists and 'Chickenguzzlers'". The Gloucester Advocate, 1 April 1922, p. 1.
- "Why Import Timber to Australia?". Bunyip, (Gawler, SA : 1863 – 1954), 11 November 1949, p. 4.

== Digitisation ==
The paper has been digitised as part of the Australian Newspapers Digitisation Program of the National Library of Australia.

== See also ==
- List of newspapers in Australia
- List of newspapers in New South Wales
