= Cascade National Park =

National park in New South Wales, Australia

- IUCN category II (national park)
- Location within New South Wales
- Location: New South Wales
- Coordinates: 30°15′29″S 152°48′31″E
- Area: 36 km^{2} (14 sq mi)
- Established: 1999
- Governing body: NSW National Parks & Wildlife Service

Cascade National Park is a national park located in New South Wales, Australia, 431 kilometres (268 mi) northeast of Sydney. Its establishment followed environmental campaigns, including the blockading of logging within sections that would form part of the park, such as Wild Cattle Creek.

The park covers 3,700ha of temperate and subtropical rainforest.

== See also ==
- Protected areas of New South Wales
