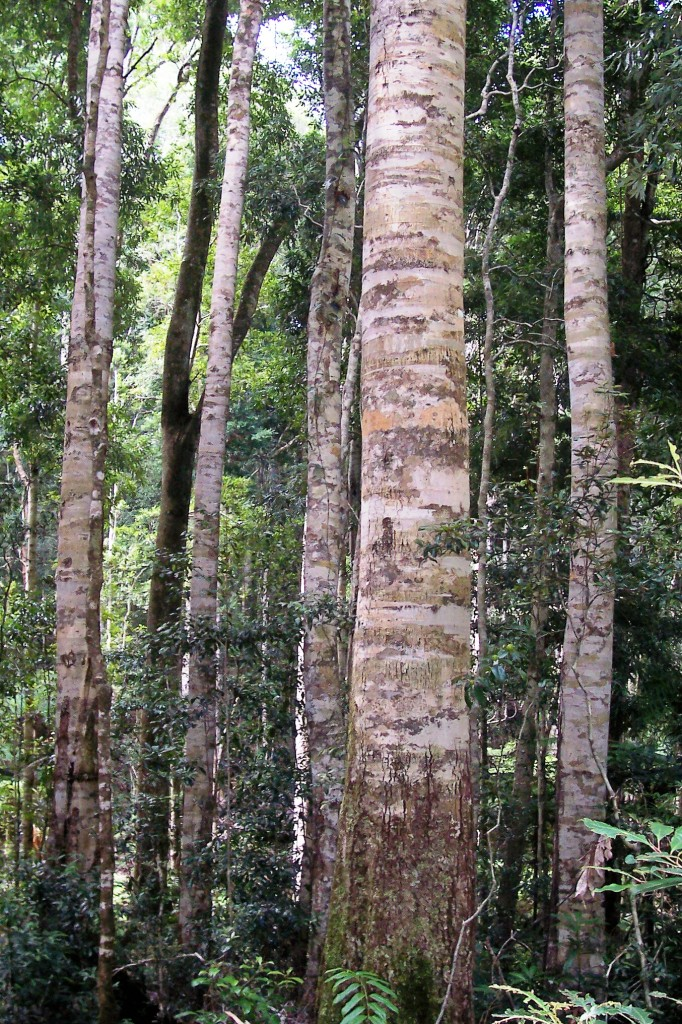
- At Nymboi-Binderay National Park

Conservation status
- Least Concern (IUCN 3.1)

Scientific classification
- Kingdom: Plantae
- Clade: Tracheophytes
- Clade: Angiosperms
- Clade: Eudicots
- Clade: Rosids
- Order: Oxalidales
- Family: Cunoniaceae
- Genus: Ceratopetalum
- Species: C. apetalum

Binomial name
- Ceratopetalum apetalum D.Don

Synonyms
- List: Ceratopetalum apetalum D.Don f. apetalum; Ceratopetalum apetalum f. montanum (D.Don) Pamp.; Ceratopetalum apetalum D.Don var. apetalum; Ceratopetalum apetalum var. microphyllum J.F.Bailey & C.T.White; Ceratopetalum apetalum var. montanum (D.Don) Domin; Ceratopetalum apetalum var. typicum Domin nom. inval.; Ceratopetalum monopetalum Caley ex D.Don nom. inval., pro syn.; Ceratopetalum montanum D.Don

= Ceratopetalum apetalum =

Coachwood

Species of tree

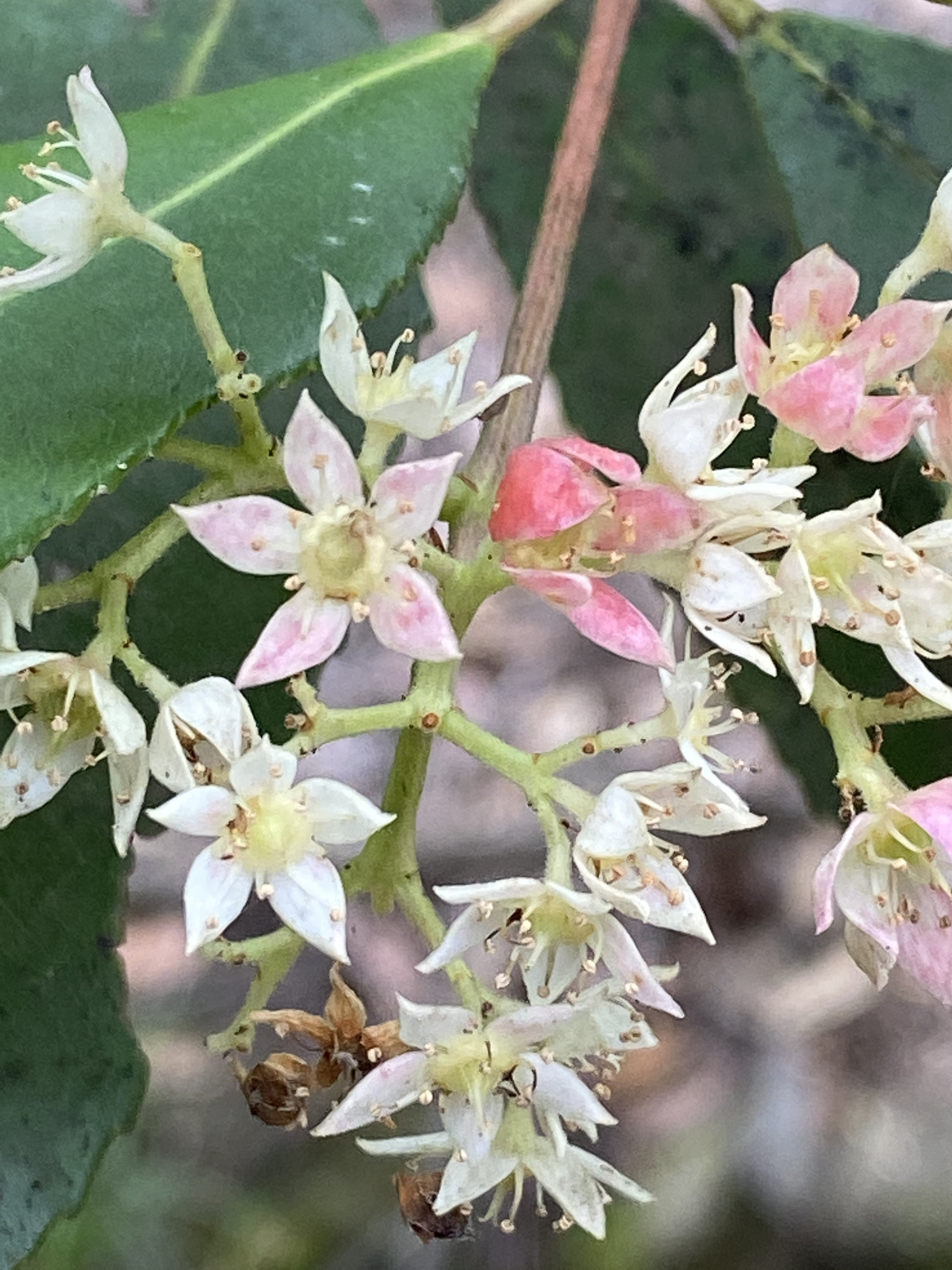
Flowers

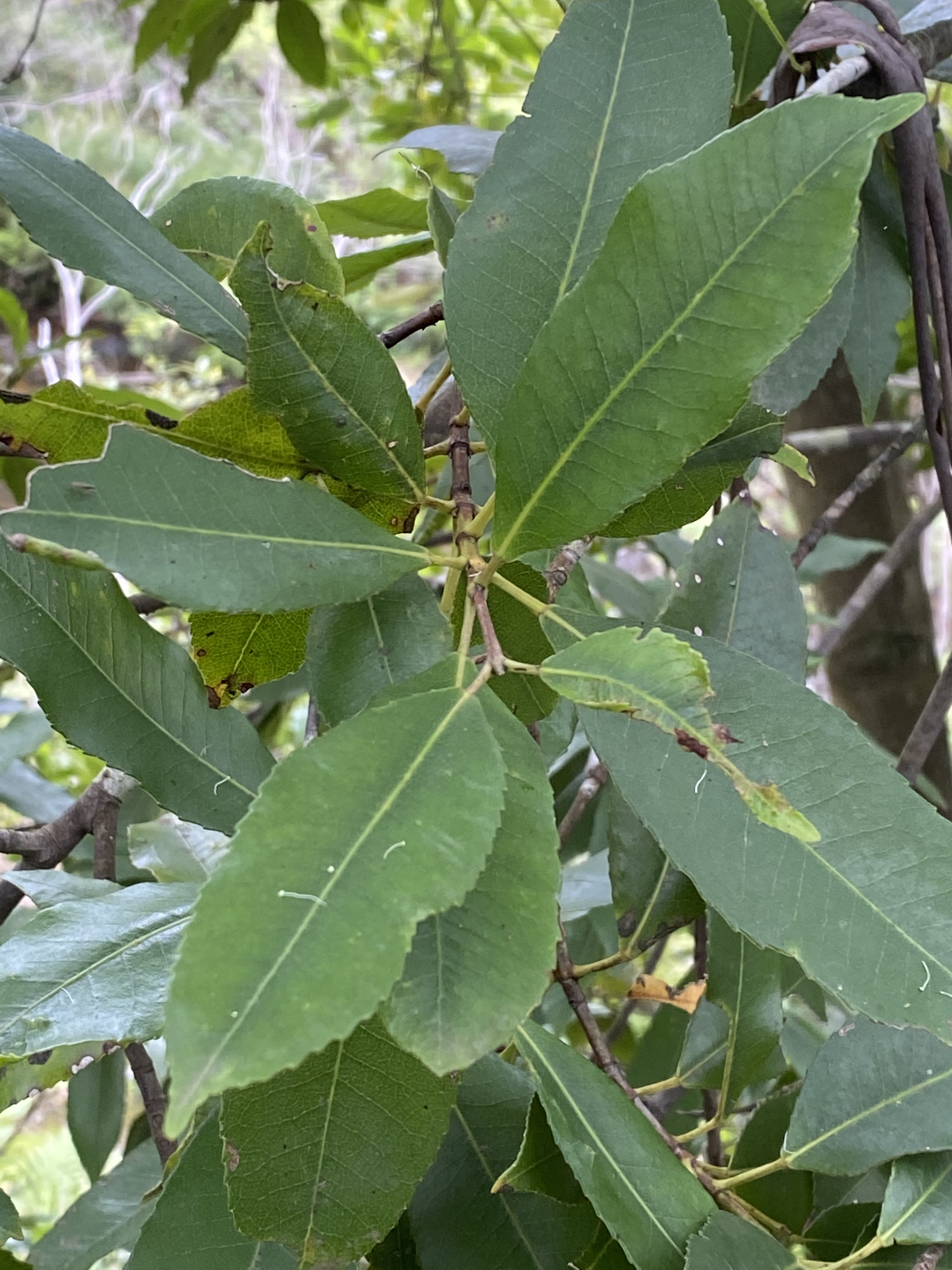
Foliage

Ceratopetalum apetalum, the coachwood, scented satinwood or tarwood, is a medium-sized hardwood tree, straight-growing with smooth, fragrant, greyish bark. It is native to eastern Australia in the central and northern coastal rainforests of New South Wales and southern Queensland, where it is often found on poorer quality soils in gullies and creeks and often occurs in almost pure stands. C. apetalum is one of 8 species of Ceratopetalum occurring in eastern Australia, New Guinea, New Britain and various islands in the same region.

== Description ==
Coachwood usually grows to a height of 25 metres, with a trunk diameter of 90 cm (35 in). However, exceptional specimens can reach 40 metres tall and live for centuries. The stem has distinctive horizontal marks, or scars, which often encircle the trunk. Larger trees have short buttresses. The heartwood is attractive with a colour ranging from pale pink to pinkish-brown. The sapwood is not always distinguishable, with a grain that is straight, finely textured and even. On the tangential face, the wood is often highly figured. The wood has a characteristic caramel odour.

== Taxonomy ==
Ceratopetalum apetalum was first formally described in 1830 by David Don in the Edinburgh Philosophical Journal, from specimens collected by George Caley.

The common name of coachwood comes from its use in the building of coaches.

== Uses ==
Its timber is light and easily worked. It is used for flooring, furniture and cabinetwork, interior fittings, turnery, gun stocks, wood carving, and veneers, as well as spars and masts for boats. Courtroom number three of The High Court of Australia is completely furnished with coachwood timber.
