= Bielsdown River =

Coordinates: 30°19′S 152°44′E

Bielsdown River Bielsdown Creek
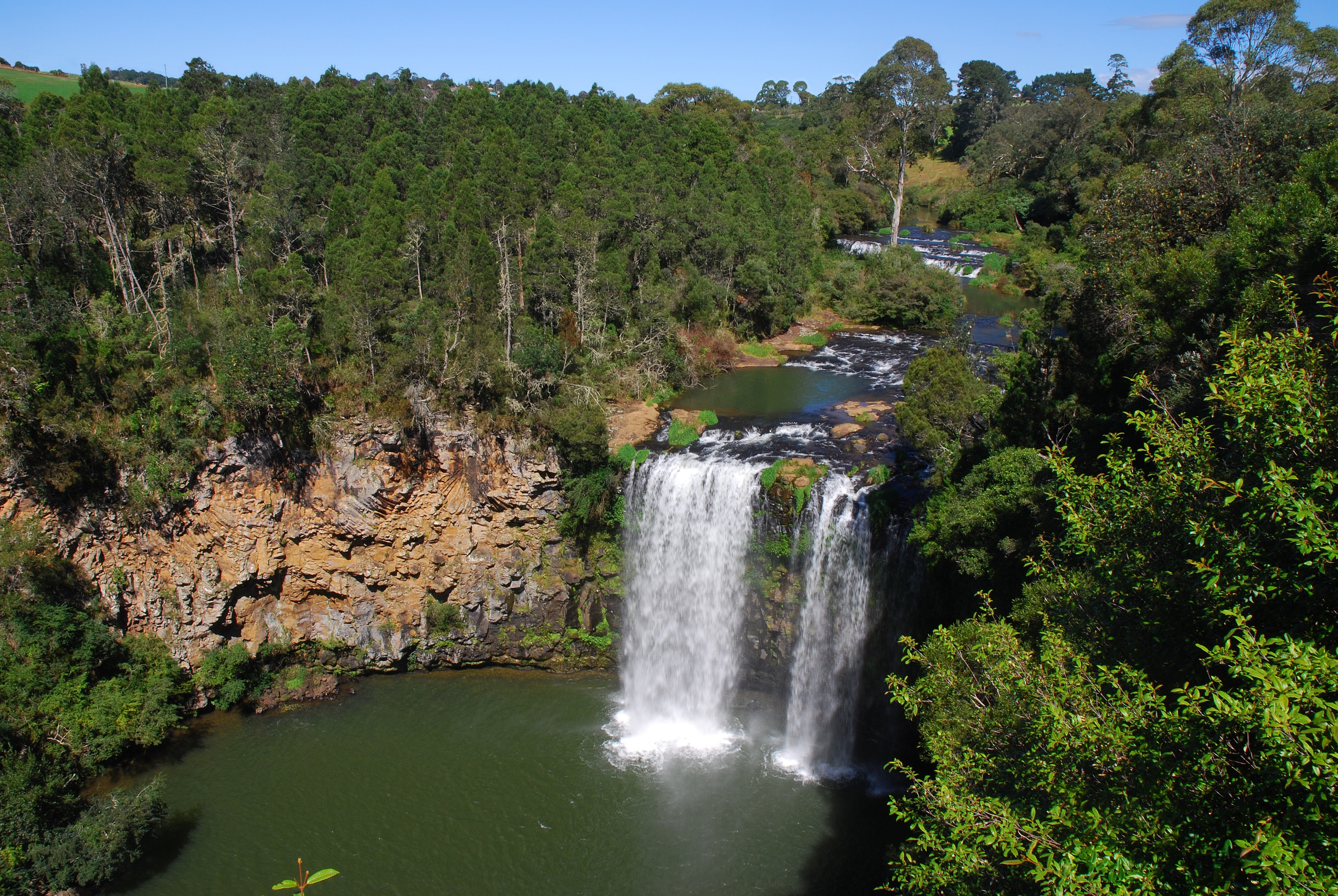
- Dangar Falls on the Bielsdown River.

Location
- Country: Australia
- State: New South Wales
- IBRA: NSW North Coast
- District: Northern Tablelands
- Municipality: Bellingen

Physical characteristics
- Source: Dorrigo Plateau, Great Dividing Range
  - location: west of Dorrigo
  - elevation: 936 m (3,071 ft)
- Mouth: confluence with the Nymboida River
  - location: west of Cascade
  - elevation: 477 m (1,565 ft)
- Length: 38 km (24 mi)

Basin features
- River system: Clarence River catchment
- Tributaries
  - right: Rocky Creek (New South Wales)
- Waterfall: Dangar Falls

Bielsdown River, a perennial stream that is part of the Clarence River catchment, is located in the Northern Tablelands of New South Wales, Australia.

== Course ==
Bielsdown River rises on the Dorrigo Plateau within the Great Dividing Range, below Fernbrook, west of Dorrigo, and flows generally to the north and northeast, joined by one minor tributary towards its confluence with Nymboida River, west of Cascade. The river descends 459 metres (1,506 ft) over its 38 kilometres (24 mi) course.

About 1.2 kilometres (0.75 mi) north of Dorrigo, the river descends downs Dangar Falls. The falls are small but picturesque, and are a popular photographic subject.

== See also ==
- Rivers of New South Wales
- List of rivers of New South Wales (A–K)
- List of rivers of Australia
