= Richard Craig (adventurer) =

- Born: 1812; Ireland
- Died: 14 July 1855 (aged 42–43); Grafton, New South Wales, Australia
- Occupations: Stockman, drover

Richard Craig (1812 – 14 July 1855) was a free settler in the Australian colony of New South Wales, a convicted criminal, an escaped convict, and a pardoned convict who worked as a stockman and drover.

== Early life ==
Richard Craig was the son of William Craig (1772–1828) and was born in Ireland. When he was aged eight his father was sentenced to seven years transportation. Although contrary to the rules governing convict transportation, Richard sailed with his father to New South Wales as a free person. He arrived in Sydney, aged nine, on 9 January 1821, on the Prince Regent. In 1825, William Craig was convicted of cattle stealing and was sentenced to serve three years in the penal settlement of Port Macquarie, about 400 kilometres (250 mi) north of Sydney. During this time, Richard came to know the surrounding countryside, made friends with the Aborigines and learned their language.

== Conviction ==
Richard and his father were carrying on the trade of butchers in Sydney on 2 July 1828 when both were charged with stealing five head of cattle from a herd at Richmond. On 15 September 1828, William was sentenced to 14 years on Norfolk Island and Richard, at the age of 16, was sentenced to death. His sentence was commuted to seven years hard labour in chains at Moreton Bay under Captain Patrick Logan, where he arrived on 24 January 1829, one of 137 felons aboard the Edinburgh.

== Escape ==
He escaped and was recaptured twice in 1829, being absent for 12 days in March and again from 20 September to 10 November. He again escaped on 17 December 1830, and made an astonishing journey south through the bush to what is now the Queensland–New South Wales border, and then through the New England area towards Port Macquarie. He spent almost 12 months living with Aborigines around the Clarence River, where he became familiar with the country and rivers. Gradually he moved south and arrived at Port Macquarie in late November 1831.

Upon arrival, he gave an account of the rivers and rich grazing flats in northern New South Wales and also the sighting of escaped cattle. As reward for this information, he was allowed to remain at Port Macquarie instead of being returned to Moreton Bay and was allowed to go into private service.

== Freedom ==
By 1836 he had been pardoned and was living and working as a free man. He travelled to Maclean (on the Clarence River) to cut cedar and for many years made a good living as a guide in the Clarence River area, travelling and blazing trails through previously inaccessible country. In what may have been his first job as a guide, he was employed by a Thomas Small of Sydney who, inspired by Craig's reports, sent on 5 May 1838 his brother and two dozen sawyers on board the schooner Susan to the "Big River" (later named the Clarence by Governor Gipps). It was the first European vessel to enter the river.

During his 12-month journey from Moreton Bay to Port Macquarie in 1831 Craig had explored the upper reaches of the Clarence River, including the western section of what was then known as Guy Fawkes Plateau (now Dorrigo Plateau). After he was pardoned he returned and used his unique knowledge of the area to blaze a trail from Guy Fawkes (Ebor) to The Settlement (South Grafton). This track was known as Craig's Line and pioneered the traffic link between Grafton and Armidale, allowing the movement of large parties of new settlers from the New England Tableland into the Clarence Valley.

In 1843 he was superintendent of a property, Eatonsville (on the Clarence River) but by 1855 was again a butcher. He married Anne Baker and had six sons and one daughter. He died on 14 July 1855 in Grafton from complications arising from a fall from a horse.
