= Lowanna, New South Wales =

Lowanna
- Town
- Coordinates: 30°13′S 152°54′E
- Country: Australia
- State: New South Wales
- LGA: City of Coffs Harbour
- Location: 562 km (349 mi) from Sydney

Government
  - State electorate: Coffs Harbour
  - Federal division: Division of Page
- Elevation: 485 m (1,591 ft)

Population
  - Total: 359 (2021 census)
- Postcode: 2450
- County: Fitzroy
- Parish: Gundar
- Mean max temp: 22.0 °C (71.6 °F)
- Mean min temp: 8.5 °C (47.3 °F)
- Annual rainfall: 1,693.3 mm (66.67 in)

Lowanna is a village in the Eastern Dorrigo plateau and Coffs Harbour hinterland, officially a suburb of the City of Coffs Harbour. It has a Community Hall, Primary School, Preschool, Rural Fire Brigade, waste transfer station, General Store and Reserve with public toilets, multisports court and playground. The name Lowanna is an Aboriginal language word meaning "girl". Lowanna had a train station on the now-closed Dorrigo railway line that is maintained by the Glenreagh Mountain Railway.
