= Nymboida, New South Wales =

Town in New South Wales, Australia

Nymboida
- Town
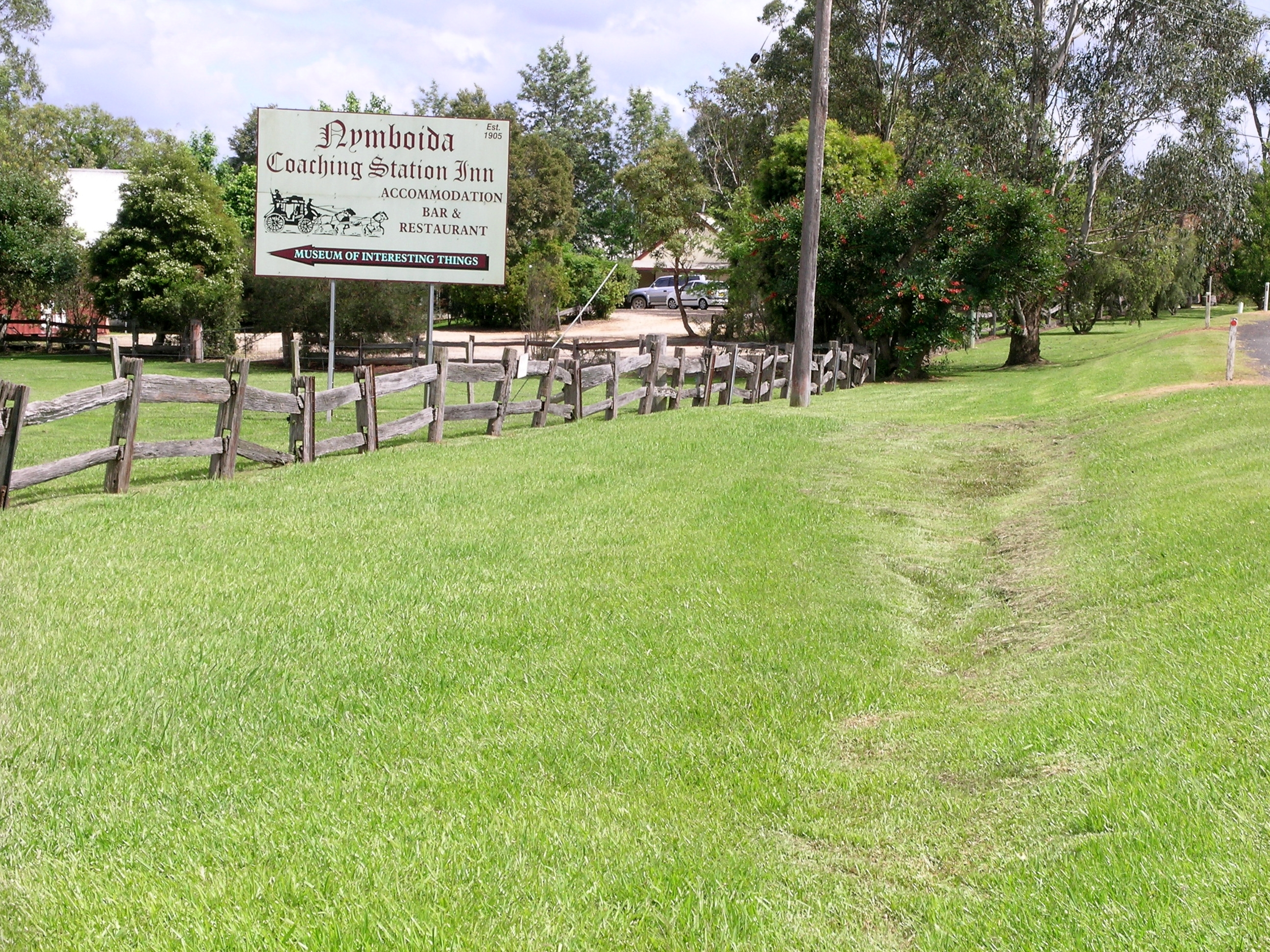
- The Coaching Station Inn

- Coordinates: 29°56′S 152°44′E
- Country: Australia
- State: New South Wales
- LGA: Clarence Valley
- Location: 44 km (27 mi) from Grafton

Government
  - State electorate: Clarence
  - Federal division: Page
- Elevation: 195 m (640 ft)

Population
  - Total: 268 (2021 census)
- Postcode: 2460
- County: Fitzroy

Nymboida is a rural village in the Clarence Valley, 44km south-west of Grafton on Armidale Road, in the Northern Rivers region of New South Wales, Australia. According to the 2021 census, Nymboida has a population of 268 people.

The village of Nymboida is close to the challenging and popular white water rafting waters of the Nymboida River along the Armidale–Grafton Road.

== History ==
Settlement began in 1840 when squatters Gregory Blaxland Jnr, son of the explorer Gregory Blaxland, and William Forster established sheep stations in the area. Blaxland subsequently named his land claim Pandemonium due to the conflict that was encountered. Several years later, when he was trying to sell the land, Blaxland changed the name of the property to Nymboida. The naming of the town of Nymboida, which is located within the boundaries of Blaxland's initial claim, was derived from this title. Blaxland was murdered by Aboriginal people at Gin Gin, in what became known as the Tirroan Tragedy.

Historical population
Year	Pop.	±%
2006	427	—
2011	301	−29.5%
2016	298	−1.0%
2021	268	−10.1%
Source: Australian Bureau of Statistics data.

Nymboida became a service stop for Cobb and Co stagecoaches, bullock teams, timber cutters, graziers and other pioneers who stopped here on the wool road from Armidale to Grafton. Nymboida now has an inn, general store, police station, and a public primary school with 19 pupils enrolled as of 2025. Agriculture and tourism are the main sources of income in the region.

The Nymboida Colliery operated from 1909 to 1979; during the last four years of operation it was operated by the Miners Federation. From 1952 to 1979, coal from the mine fed a power station at Koolkhan.

== See also ==
- Nymboida National Park, 40 km northwest of the village
- Nymboida Power Station
