= Bindarri National Park =

National park in New South Wales, Australia

- IUCN category II (national park)
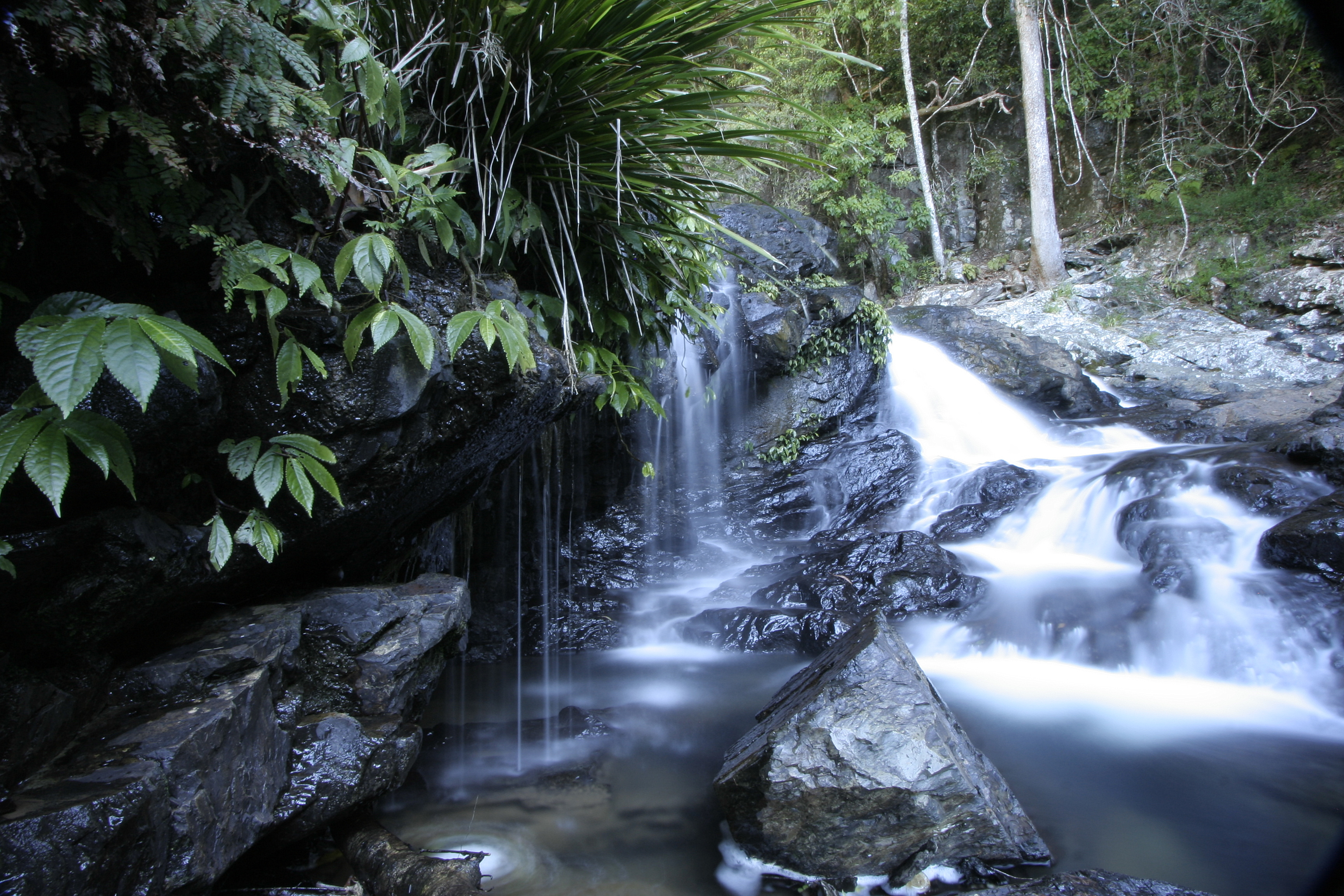
- Bangalore Falls, Bindarri National Park

- Location within New South Wales
- Location: New South Wales
- Nearest city: Coffs Harbour
- Coordinates: 30°17′42″S 152°55′59″E
- Area: 55.95 km^{2} (21.60 sq mi)
- Established: 1 January 1999
- Governing body: National Parks and Wildlife Service (New South Wales)

Bindarri National Park is a national park in New South Wales, Australia, 431 km northeast of Sydney.

It is considered the epicentre of biodiversity, due to the rare and endangered species found here, such as fish bone fern, southern quassia and palm orchid.

One of the natural beauties of this park is the mouth of the river Urumbilum, which, descending through the Great Escarpment, carved through spectacular waterfalls.

== See also ==
- Protected areas of New South Wales
