= Bellinger River National Park =

National park in New South Wales, Australia

- IUCN category II (national park)
- Location within New South Wales
- Location: New South Wales
- Coordinates: 30°24′34″S 152°41′38″E
- Area: 28.3 km^{2} (10.9 sq mi)
- Established: 1997
- Governing body: National Parks and Wildlife Service (New South Wales)

Bellinger River National Park is a national park in New South Wales, Australia, about 410 km north of Sydney. The main feature of the park is the Bellinger River and the unspoilt forests on its upper reaches. There are untouched wilderness of steep slopes and valleys, with numerous waterfalls in this national park.

28 species of birds have been recorded in the park.

== See also ==
- Protected areas of New South Wales
