= Nymboida River =

River in New South Wales, Australia

Coordinates: 29°39′S 152°30′E

Nymboida Coutts Water, The Harness Cask
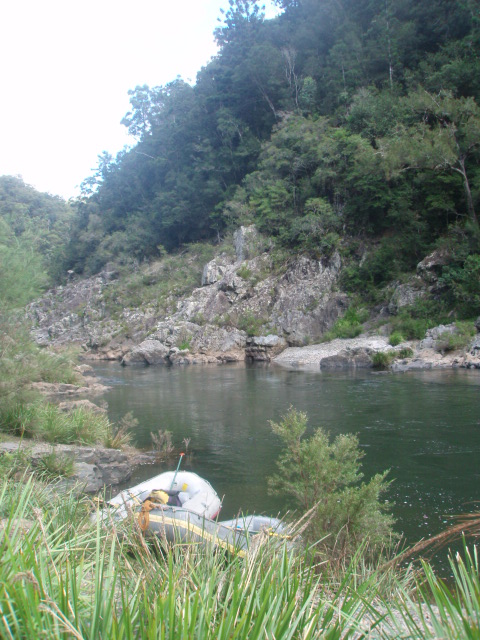
- Nymboida River, 2008

Location
- Country: Australia
- State: New South Wales
- Region: NSW North Coast (IBRA), Northern Rivers
- Local government areas: Bellingen, Clarence Valley

Physical characteristics
- Source: Barren Mountain, Great Dividing Range
  - location: Bellinger River National Park
  - elevation: 1,370 m (4,490 ft)
- Mouth: confluence with the Mann River
  - location: below Mount Gundahl, within the Nymboida National Park
  - elevation: 119 m (390 ft)
- Length: 165 km (103 mi)

Basin features
- River system: Clarence River catchment
- Tributaries
  - left: Allans Water, Blicks River, Clouds Creek, Boyd River
  - right: Deer Park Creek, Little Murray River, Bielsdown River, Wild Cattle Creek, Little Nymboida River, Boundary Creek
- National parks: Bellinger River NP, Nymboida NP, Nymboi-Binderay NP

The Nymboida River, a perennial stream of the Clarence River catchment, is located in the Northern Rivers region of New South Wales, Australia.

== Course and features ==
The Nymboida River rises in the northern foothills of the Barren Mountain, on the slopes of the Great Dividing Range, within Bellinger River National Park, west of Dorrigo. Annual high rainfall on the Dorrigo Plateau produces strong river flows during most seasons. The river flows in a meandering course generally northeast, joined by nine tributaries including the Little Murray, Bielsdown, Blicks, Little Nymboida, and Boyd rivers, before reaching its confluence with the Mann River, below Mount Gundahl, within the Nymboida National Park. The river descends 1,250 metres (4,100 ft) over its 165-kilometre (103 mi) course.

Flowing through Nymboi-Binderay National Park from Platypus Flat to The Junction confluence with the Little Nymboida River, there is a 27-kilometre (17 mi) section of rapid and pool sequences, making this a popular kayaking and white water rafting venue. Located 13 kilometres (8.1 mi) from the source is Rob Roys Falls, a 90-metre (300 ft) cascade while further down river lies The Silent Pool, a geological mystery where the river goes underground via a fault line and returns under a large pool.

The river is also a stronghold for the endangered Eastern Freshwater cod where it is quite common in several reaches.

Until 2012 waters released from the hydro-electric power station on the Nymboida River created one of Australia's most difficult canoe courses and as such was the site of many kayaking and canoeing competitions. Several companies offer organised rafting trips on the river.

== See also ==
- Rivers of New South Wales
