= Nymboida National Park =

National park in Australia

- IUCN category Ib (wilderness area)
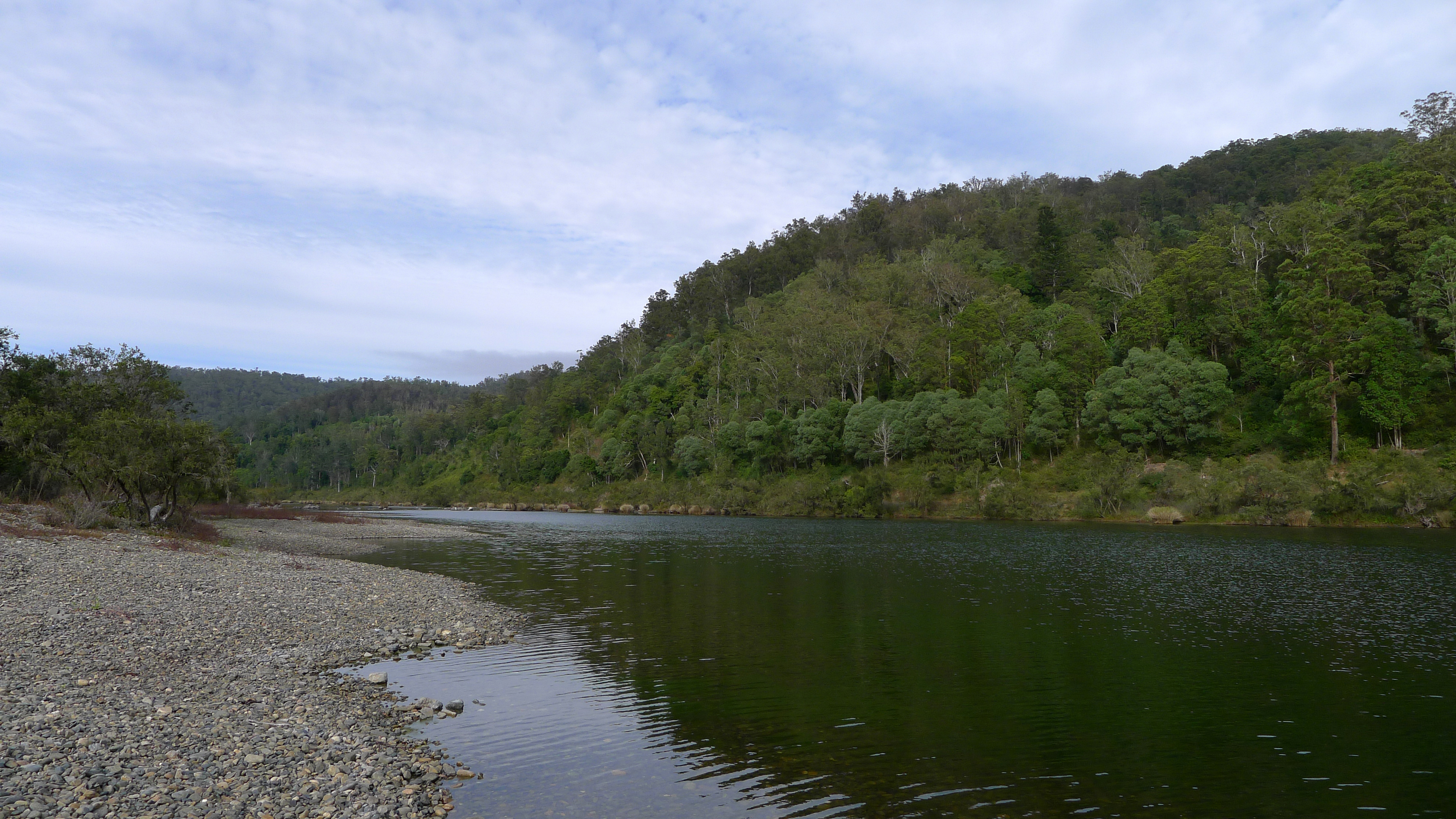
- Nymboida National Park, August 2014

- Location within New South Wales
- Location: New South Wales
- Coordinates: 29°38′39″S 152°25′05″E
- Area: 316 km^{2} (122 sq mi)
- Established: 1980
- Governing body: NSW National Parks & Wildlife Service
- Website: Official website

Nymboida is a national park in New South Wales, Australia, 485 km north of Sydney.

Some of the possibilities are bird watching, camping, hiking, canoeing and swimming in the clear cold water of the Nymboida and Mann rivers. The average elevation of the terrain is 531 metres.

== See also ==
- Protected areas of New South Wales
- High Conservation Value Old Growth forest
