= Dorrigo, New South Wales =

Dorrigo
- Town
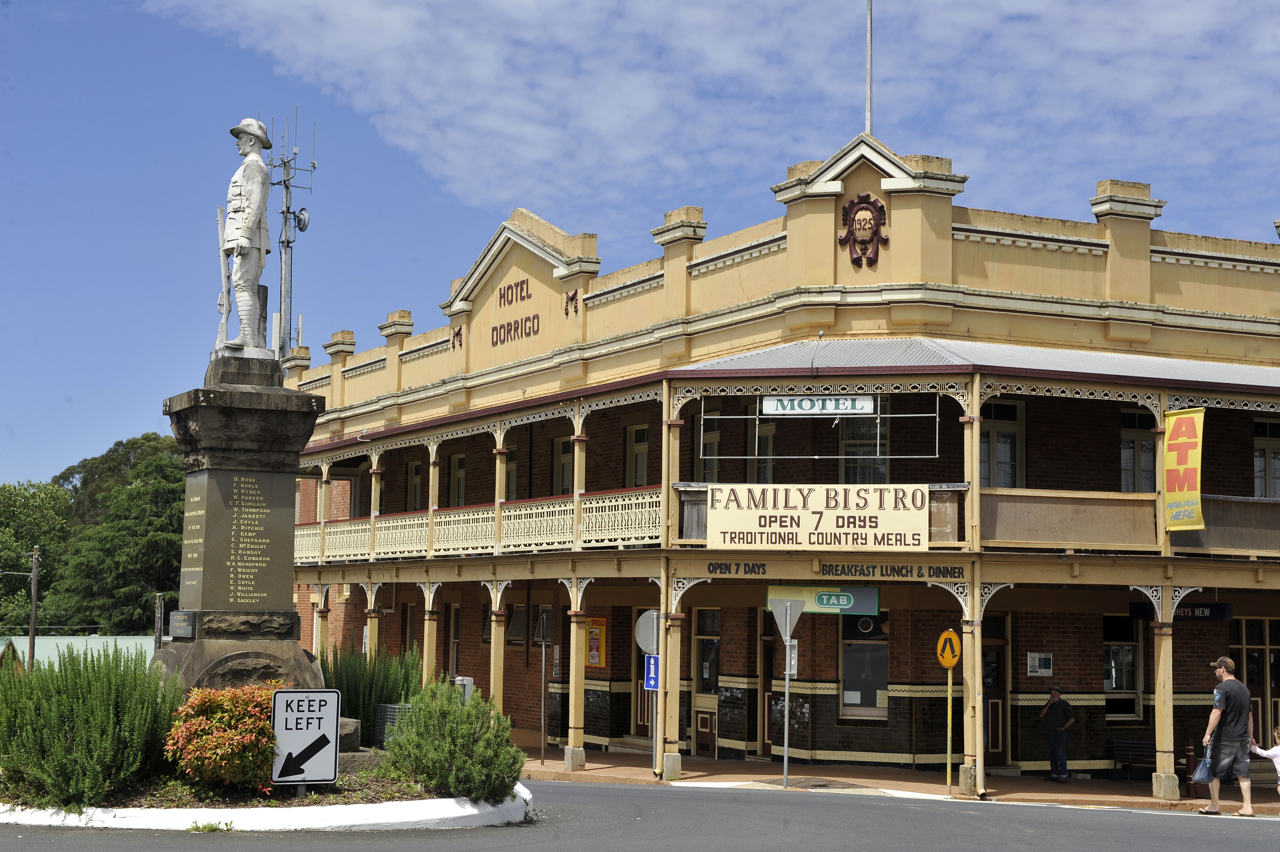
- Dorrigo Main Square

- Coordinates: 30°20′S 152°43′E
- Country: Australia
- State: New South Wales
- LGA: Bellingen Shire
- Location: 580 km (360 mi) N of Sydney; 64 km (40 mi) SW of Coffs Harbour; 29 km (18 mi) W of Bellingen; 128 km (80 mi) E of Armidale

Government
  - State electorate: Oxley
  - Federal division: Cowper
- Elevation: 731 m (2,398 ft)

Population
  - Total: 1,046 (2021 census)
- Postcode: 2453
- Mean max temp: 20.0 °C (68.0 °F)
- Mean min temp: 10.0 °C (50.0 °F)
- Annual rainfall: 2,034.1 mm (80.08 in)

Dorrigo, a small town on the Waterfall Way, is located on the Northern Tablelands, in northern New South Wales, Australia. The town is part of Bellingen local government area.

It is approximately 580 kilometres (360 mi) north of the state capital, Sydney via the Pacific Highway, and 64 kilometres (40 mi) west from the coastal city of Coffs Harbour. The town is situated on the Dorrigo Plateau near the New England Escarpment, which is part of the Great Dividing Range. Dorrigo is 731 metres (2,398 ft) above sea level. At the 2021 census, Dorrigo had a population of 1,046 people.

== History ==
The area now known as Dorrigo lies on the traditional land of the Gumbainggir people.

The name Dorrigo has its antecedence in the Gumbaingiir language, the name of the indigenous people upon whose land Dorrigo stands, and it means 'Stringy Bark' (Dundurriga).

European settlement of the area followed on from the early timber cutters in the 1860s. The first official European in the district was Land Commissioner Oakes who sighted the mouth of the Bellinger River.

By 1841, timber cutters had entered the Bellinger River searching for red cedar (Toona australis). They set up camps and moved from one stand of trees to the next.

Richard Craig, an escaped convict from the Moreton Bay Penal Settlement, was the first European to reach the Dorrigo Plateau, following the traditional indigenous route to Armidale from the Grafton area. Using his skills as a horseman, Craig travelled along the western side of the Nymboida River. Craig's track became a road, now roughly following the same path as the present Grafton to Armidale Road and travelling through the present day villages of Nymboida, Billy's Creek, Dundurrabin, Tyringham and Ebor. Timbergetters followed Craig through the sub tropical rainforest and many sawmills grew due to demand for timber, initially the highly prized Australian red cedar (Toona australis).

Today, the main access road traversing the plateau from east to west is the Waterfall Way. It was not until the 1860s that permanent settlement occurred in the district. The dairy industry became a mainstay of the Dorrigo Plateau and today tourism is becoming more important. On 23 December 1924, the Glenreagh to Dorrigo railway opened. Due to flood damage, the line closed on 28 October 1972.

On 31 October 2005, sixty-eight dairy cows, all in full milk, died on a farm at Fernbrook on the Waterfall Way near Dorrigo after being struck by lightning. Three others were paralysed for several hours but they later made a full recovery. The cows were sheltering under a tree when it was struck by lightning and the electricity spread onto the surrounding soil killing the animals.

On 14 May 2020, the Dorrigo War Memorial was damaged in a car accident and was reinstalled on 3 February 2021.

On 19 April 2025 the Dorrigo War Memorial was damaged in an act of vandalism. The perpetrators broke off a piece of the statue to use in a lewd act whilst intoxicated. The couple were fined and ordered to pay $25,000 towards the cost of repairing the statue.

== Population ==
Historical population
Year	Pop.	±%
1954	1,080	—
1961	1,027	−4.9%
1966	1,111	+8.2%
1971	1,078	−3.0%
1976	1,152	+6.9%
1981	1,192	+3.5%
1986	1,167	−2.1%
1991	1,135	−2.7%
1996	1,013	−10.7%
2001	969	−4.3%
2006	967	−0.2%
2011	1,072	+10.9%
2016	1,042	−2.8%
2021	1,046	+0.4%
Source: Australian Bureau of Statistics data.

In the 2021 Census, there were 1,046 people in Dorrigo. 80.8% of people were born in Australia and 90.2% of people only spoke English at home. The most common responses for religion were No Religion 42.5%, Anglican 23.4% and Catholic 10.1%.

== Attractions ==
Dorrigo is home to the planned Dorrigo Steam Railway and Museum which is not yet open to the public. It houses the largest collection of railway vehicles and memorabilia from the various Government and private railways of New South Wales. It is one of the most comprehensive railway collections in the world, with items in the collection ranging from 1855 to the present day. The museum is not open to the public however the larger items such as steam engines and carriages can be viewed from outside the property. The nearby World Heritage listed Dorrigo National Park and New England National Park cater for persons interested in natural sights.

=== Dangar Falls ===
Dangar Falls are located about 1.2 kilometres (0.75 mi) north of Dorrigo, on the Bielsdown River. The falls are small but picturesque, and are a popular photographic subject. For a short time after rain they are quite spectacular. There is an attractive picnic spot which offers excellent views. It is possible to climb down the banks and walk along the river below the water falls.

These falls are often confused with Dangars Falls, near Armidale, about 125 kilometres (78 mi) to the west, along the Waterfall Way. For more information about Dangars Falls see the articles on Dangarsleigh and on the Oxley Wild Rivers National Park.

Public safety warnings against jumping from Dorrigo Falls were issued after two tourists were killed in separate incidents jumping from the falls in 2012 and 2024.

=== Dorrigo monument ===
The Dorrigo War Memorial is a stone column in the centre of the intersection of Waterfall Way and Hickory Street. It is a brown stone obelisk with the names of First World War servicemen and women carved into the stone in gold letters. The names of Servicemen and women and dedications from the Second World War are carved on plaques attached to the original stonework. A white stone statue of a soldier stands atop the memorial, facing east. The monument is surrounded by a small garden with ground lighting to illuminate the memorial at night.

== Schools ==
- Dorrigo Public School
- Mt Saint John's Primary School
- Dorrigo High School

== Media ==
A local newspaper, the Don Dorrigo Gazette, was first published in 1910. As of 2010, it was believed to be the last newspaper in Australia printed using hot metal typesetting. The final edition was published in late June 2023, with the owners announcing the paper's closure on 4 July 2023. Costs and increasing competition from social media were cited as reasons for its demise.

== Climate ==
Dorrigo has an oceanic climate or highland subtropical climate (Köppen: Cfb). The average annual rainfall is almost 2,000mm, making Dorrigo one of the wettest towns in New South Wales.

Climate data for Dorrigo (Dorrigo Old Coramba Road, 1996–2019)
Month	Jan	Feb	Mar	Apr	May	Jun	Jul	Aug	Sep	Oct	Nov	Dec	Year
Record high °C (°F)	36.3 (97.3)	38.0 (100.4)	34.1 (93.4)	28.0 (82.4)	25.0 (77.0)	25.0 (77.0)	22.8 (73.0)	29.5 (85.1)	32.0 (89.6)	34.6 (94.3)	36.3 (97.3)	34.5 (94.1)	38.0 (100.4)
Mean daily maximum °C (°F)	24.5 (76.1)	23.9 (75.0)	22.5 (72.5)	19.8 (67.6)	17.2 (63.0)	14.9 (58.8)	14.6 (58.3)	16.2 (61.2)	19.3 (66.7)	21.2 (70.2)	22.3 (72.1)	23.9 (75.0)	20.0 (68.0)
Mean daily minimum °C (°F)	15.1 (59.2)	15.1 (59.2)	13.7 (56.7)	10.7 (51.3)	7.4 (45.3)	5.5 (41.9)	4.4 (39.9)	4.8 (40.6)	7.6 (45.7)	9.9 (49.8)	12.1 (53.8)	13.9 (57.0)	10.0 (50.0)
Record low °C (°F)	7.5 (45.5)	8.5 (47.3)	6.0 (42.8)	1.0 (33.8)	−3.0 (26.6)	−3.5 (25.7)	−3.0 (26.6)	−3.2 (26.2)	−0.4 (31.3)	−0.7 (30.7)	3.9 (39.0)	3.6 (38.5)	−3.5 (25.7)
Average rainfall mm (inches)	264.5 (10.41)	261.6 (10.30)	309.0 (12.17)	138.9 (5.47)	87.9 (3.46)	134.0 (5.28)	55.0 (2.17)	99.9 (3.93)	76.7 (3.02)	119.9 (4.72)	179.5 (7.07)	179.5 (7.07)	1,922.4 (75.69)
Average rainy days	14.8	15.8	18.0	14.6	10.8	10.5	9.0	7.3	9.0	12.2	15.5	16.5	154.0
Average relative humidity (%)	73	75	75	73	68	65	60	55	57	61	70	70	67
Source: Bureau of Meteorology

=== Significant weather events ===
On 19 October 1913, a severe hailstorm struck Dorrigo, where hail fell for an hour, with hail banked up in many places. The storm caused hundreds of pounds of damage. On 6 August 1923, the first known snowfall occurred at Dorrigo.

On 24 June 1950, 636.0 millimetres (25.04 in) of rain was recorded in the 24 hours to 9 am at Dorrigo Post Office. In the following 24 hours, to 9 am on 25 June 1950, a further 230.9 millimetres (9.09 in) of rain was recorded at the same site. On 21 February 1954, Dorrigo's highest daily rainfall (in the 24 hours to 9 am) of 809.2 millimetres (31.86 in) was recorded. This is also the highest daily rainfall total for anywhere in New South Wales. This was recorded at Myrtle Street in Dorrigo. Another Bureau of Meteorology site located at Dorrigo Post Office recorded 774.7 millimetres (30.50 in) of rain within the same 24-hour period to 9 am on 21 February 1954. These heavy rainfall totals were associated with a tropical cyclone which had crossed the coast at Coolangatta and Tweed Heads late on 20 February 1954.

== Notable people ==
- Brian Ferguson, principal of North Sydney Boys High School (2023–present)
- Emma Darcy, novelist
- Mark Donaldson, soldier and Victoria Cross recipient
- Dylan Edwards, rugby league player
- AJ Gilbert, rugby union player
- Adam Gilchrist, Australian National Team cricketer
- Brett Parbery, dressage rider and trainer
- Margaret Rodgers, deaconess
- Buddy Williams, country musician
- Ray Wedgwood, engineer

== Gallery ==
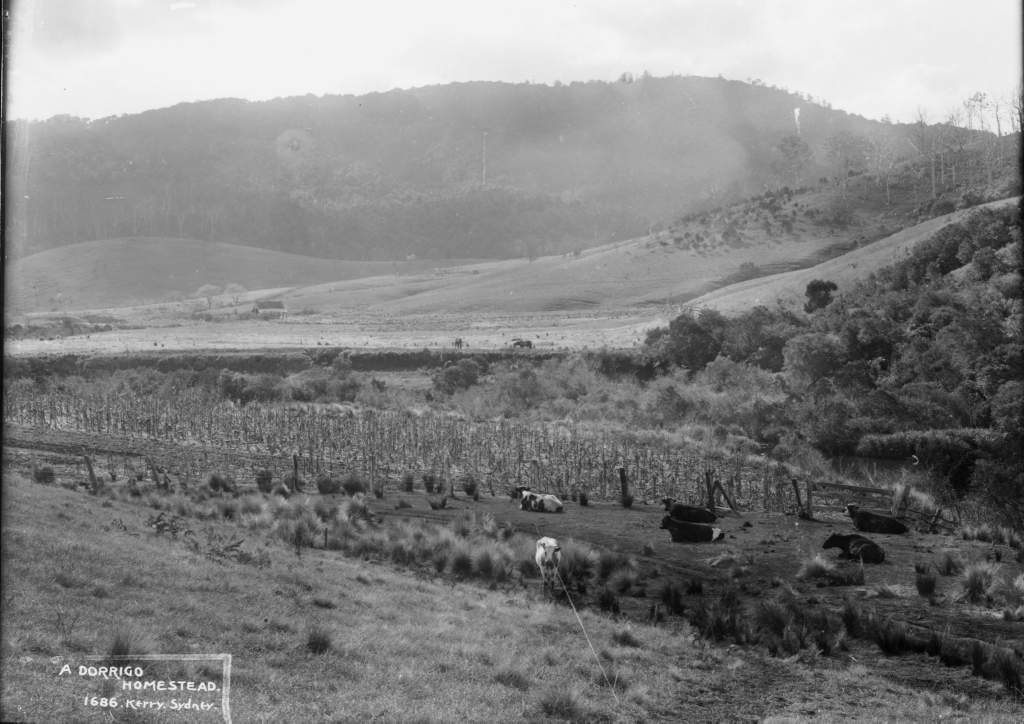
A Dorrigo homestead, circa 1900.

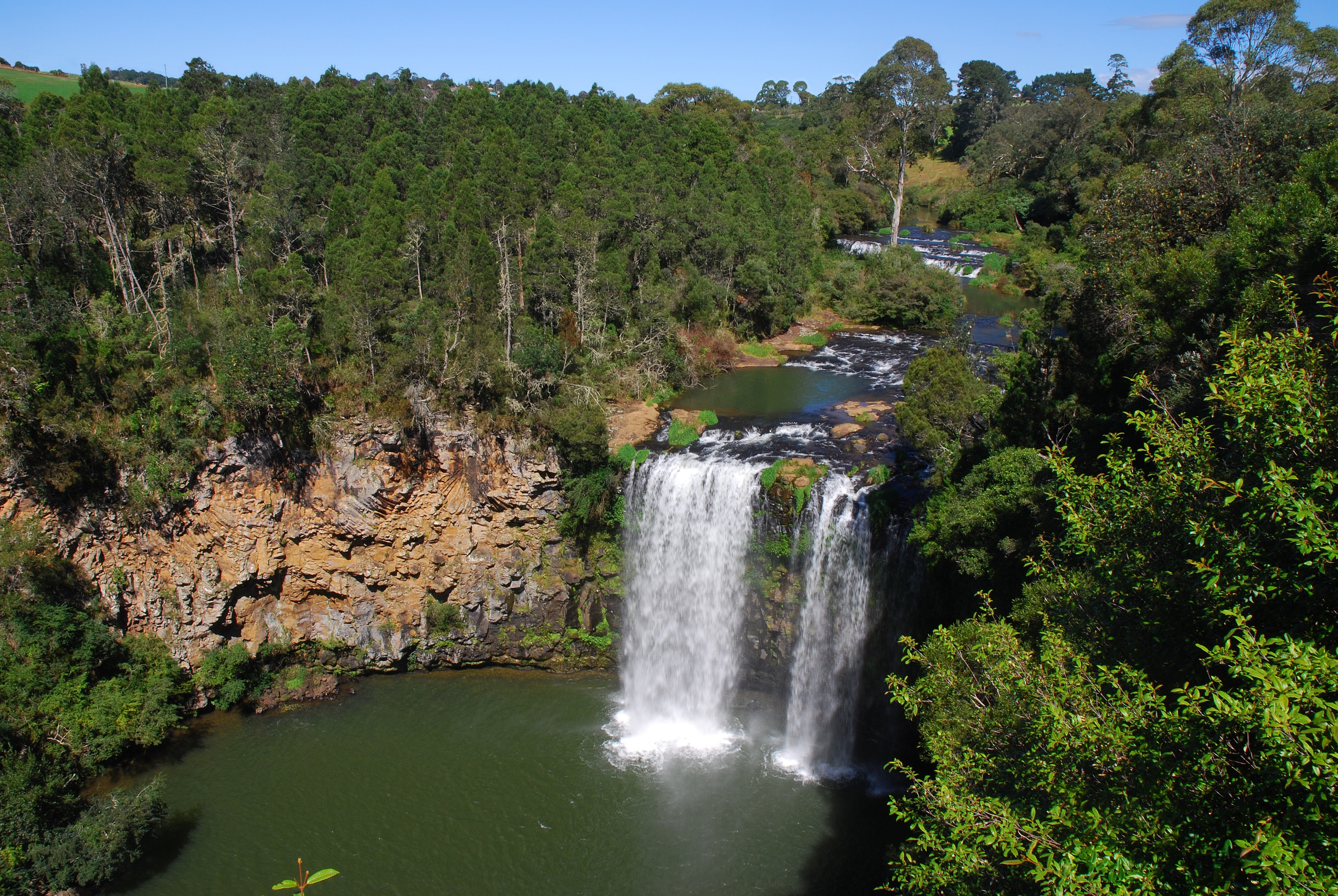
Dangar Falls at Dorrigo.

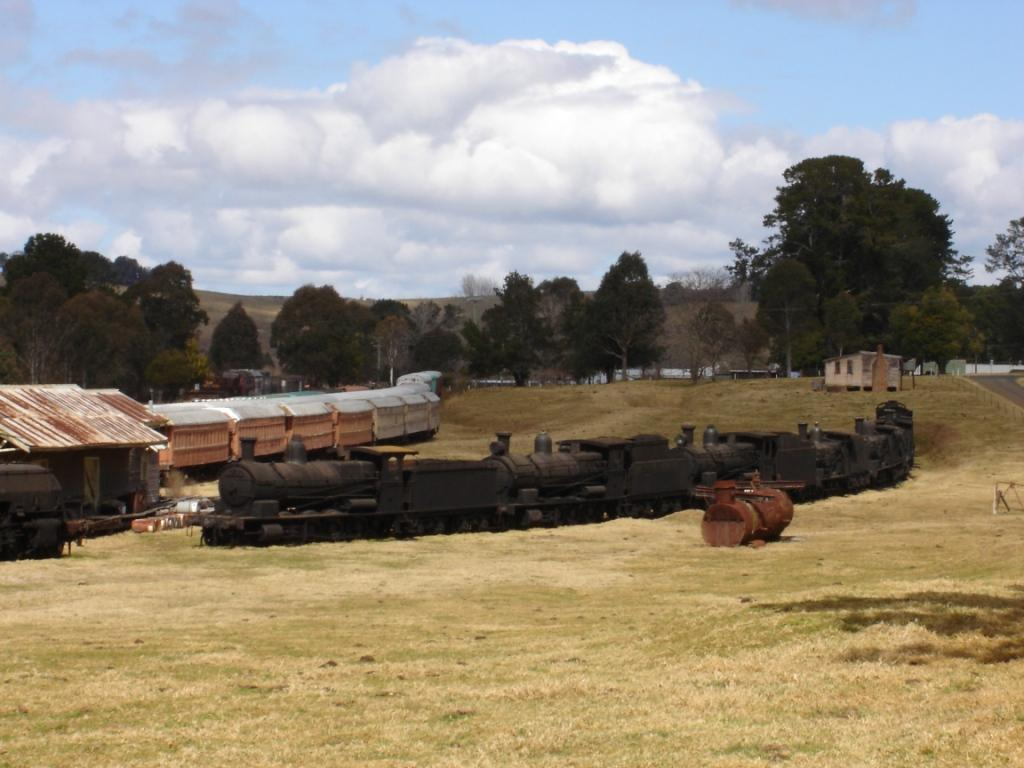
Engines and carriages on display outside the Dorrigo Steam Railway and Museum.
