= Burrinjuck Nature Reserve =

- IUCN category Ia (strict nature reserve)
- Location within New South Wales
- Location: New South Wales
- Nearest city: Burrinjuck
- Coordinates: 34°57′27″S 148°35′22″E
- Area: 52.50 km^{2} (20.27 sq mi)
- Established: 1984
- Governing body: NSW National Parks & Wildlife Service
- Website: http://www.environment.nsw.gov.au/nationalparks/parkHome.aspx?id=N0560

The Burrinjuck Nature Reserve is a protected nature reserve on the south west slopes of New South Wales, Australia.

== History ==
The reserve was established in 1984.

The entire reserve has been subject to bushfire, though some parts of the reserve have experienced fire more often than others.

== Public facilities ==
The only public facilities in the reserve are the Hume and Hovell Track and a track that leads to the summit of Mt. Barren Jack from Burrinjuck Waters State Park.

== Ecology ==
=== Flora ===
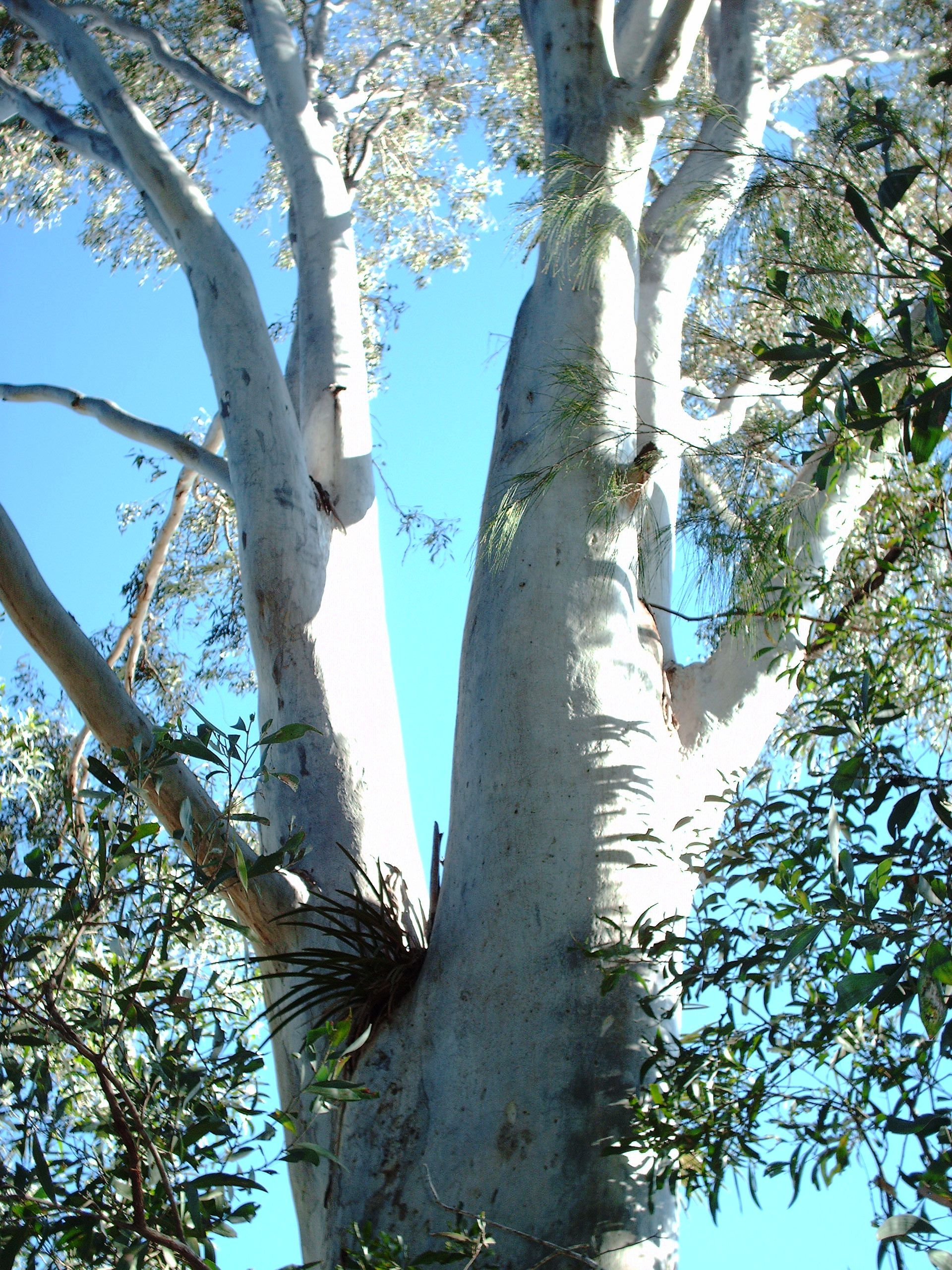
An Australian Blue Gum

Six different forest ecosystems are recognised in the reserve:

- Apple box - Norton's box - moist grass forest. This is the dominant ecosystem in the eastern part of the reserve. Common plant species include Norton's box (Eucalyptus nortonii), apple box (Eucalyptus bridgesiana), red stringybark (Eucalyptus macrorhyncha), silver wattle (Acacia dealbata), tick indigo (Indigofera adesmiifolia), stinking pennywort (Hydrocotyle laxiflora), native geranium (Geranium solanderi var. solanderi), Sheep's Burr Acaena echinata, native carrot (Daucus glochidiatus), weeping grass (Microlaena stipoides var. stipoides), snowgrass (Poa meionectes), Austral bear's ear (Cymbonotus preissianus), and Plantago varia.
- Wee Jasper Norton's box – Poa grass forest. This ecosystem is dominant on steep slopes in the south west of the reserve. Common plant species include Norton's box (Eucalyptus nortonii), red stringybark (Eucalyptus macrorhyncha), shiny cassinia (Cassinia longifolia), hoary guinea flower (Hibbertia obtusifolia), slender tea tree (Leptospermum brevipes), daphne heath (Brachyloma daphnoides), clustered everlasting (Chrysocephalum semipapposum), Gonocarpus tetragynus and snow grass (Poa sieberiana var. cyanophylla).
- Brittle Gum – Broad-Leaved Peppermint - Poa grass forest. This ecosystem is found on steeper slopes in the southern half of the reserve. Common plant species include brittle gum (Eucalyptus mannifera), broad-leaved peppermint gum (Eucalyptus dives), Robertson's peppermint (Eucalyptus robertsonii ssp. robertsonii), red stringybark (Eucalyptus macrorhyncha), pea bush (Platylobium formosum ssp. formosum), hoary guinea flower (Hibbertia obtusifolia), red-stemmed wattle (Acacia rubida), Monotoca scoparia, Gonocarpus tetragynus, grass trigger-plant (Stylidium graminifolium), Poa tenera, Brachyscome spathulata, silvertop wallaby grass (Joycea pallida) and snowgrass (Poa sieberiana var. sieberiana).
- Dwyer's Gum heathy low open woodland. This ecosystem is found at the northern edge of the reserve. Common plant species include black cypress pine (Callitris endlicheri), white box (Eucalyptus albens), red stringybark (Eucalyptus macrorhyncha), inland scribbly gum (Eucalyptus rossii), sticky everlasting (Xerochrysum viscosum), Caladenia mentiens, fringed spider orchid (Caladenia tentaculata), native carrot (Daucus glochidiatus), Gonocarpus elatus, yellow pennywort (Hydrocotyle foveolata), Senecio species, spoon cudweed (Stuartina muelleri), annual bluebell (Wahlenbergia gracilenta), snowgrass (Poa meionectes) and wattle mat-rush (Lomandra filiformis ssp. coriacea).
- Long leaved box (black cypress pine) heath shrub forest. This ecosystem is scattered throughout the central and western part of the reserve. Common plant species include long-leaved box (Eucalyptus goniocalyx), red stringybark (Eucalyptus macrorhyncha), common fringe-myrtle (Calytrix tetragona), lesser guinea flower (Hibbertia calycina), varnish wattle (Acacia verniciflua), shiny cassinia (Cassinia longifolia), grass tree (Xanthorrhoea glauca ssp. angustifolia), green wattle (Acacia deanei ssp. deanei), woolly grevillea/crimson grevillea cross (Grevillea lanigera x polybractea), Daviesia pubigera, Persoonia rigida, spotted doubletail (Diuris maculata), Dampiera purpurea and Senecio anethifolius.
- Blue Gum – Broad-Leaved Peppermint dry grass shrub forest. This ecosystem is dominant on gentle slopes in the centre of the reserve. Common plant species include southern blue gum (Eucalyptus bicostata), broad-leaved peppermint (Eucalyptus dives), red stringybark (Eucalyptus macrorhyncha), Robertson's peppermint (Eucalyptus robertsonii ssp. robertsonii), common bracken (Pteridium esculentum), silver wattle (Acacia dealbata), shiny cassinia (Cassinia longifolia), Hovea linearis, honeypots (Acrotriche serrulata), Platylobium formosum ssp. formosum, pale wedge pea (Gompholobium huegelii), Monotoca scoparia, twyning glycine (Glycine clandestina), rough bedstraw (Galium gaudichaudii), native geranium (Geranium solanderi var. solanderi), Plantago varia, Brachyscome spathulata, pink fairy orchid (Caladenia carnea var. carnea), kidneyweed (Dichondra repens), cudweed (Euchiton gymnocephalus), nodding greenhood (Pterostylis nutans), prickly starwort (Stellaria pungens), Australian bluebell (Wahlenbergia stricta ssp. stricta), common wheatgrass (Elymus scaber var. scaber), wattle mat-rush (Lomandra filiformis ssp. filiformis) and snow grass (Poa sieberiana var. hirtella and Poa sieberiana var. cyanophylla).

==== Threatened species ====
Two species listed on the Threatened Species Conservation Act 1995 (NSW) are known to exist in the reserve. The Yass daisy is listed as vulnerable, and the crimson spider orchid is listed as endangered. There are thought to be about 100 crimson spider orchid plants in the reserve, which constitute one of four known populations of the species in New South Wales.

Grevillea iaspicula meets the criteria for listing as Critically Endangered in NSW under the Threatened Species Conservation Act 1995 (NSW). Seven sub-populations of the plant are known to occur in the Wee-Jasper–Burrinjuck area; one of these sub-populations is located in the reserve.

=== Fauna ===
3 amphibian species, 9 reptile species, 32 mammal species and 179 bird species have been recorded in the reserve since the late 1970s.

==== Threatened species ====
16 animal species known to exist in the reserve are listed under the Threatened Species Conservation Act 1995 (NSW). All are listed as vulnerable. They are the gang-gang cockatoo (Callocephalon fimbriatum), turquoise parrot (Neophema pulchella), superb parrot (Polytelis swainsonii), barking owl (Ninox connivens), powerful owl (Ninox strenua), brown treecreeper (Climacteris picumnus), speckled warbler (Pyrrholaemus sagittatus), black-chinned honeyeater (Melithreptus gularis ssp. gularis), hooded robin (Melanodryas cucullata), grey-crowned babbler (Pomatostomus temporalis ssp. temporalis), olive whistler (Pachycephala olivacea), diamond firetail (Stagonopleura guttata), spotted-tailed quoll (Dasyurus maculatus), yellow-bellied glider (Petaurus australis), squirrel glider (Petaurus norfolcensis) and the eastern bent-wing bat (Miniopterus schreibersii oceanensis).

== See also ==
- Protected areas of New South Wales
