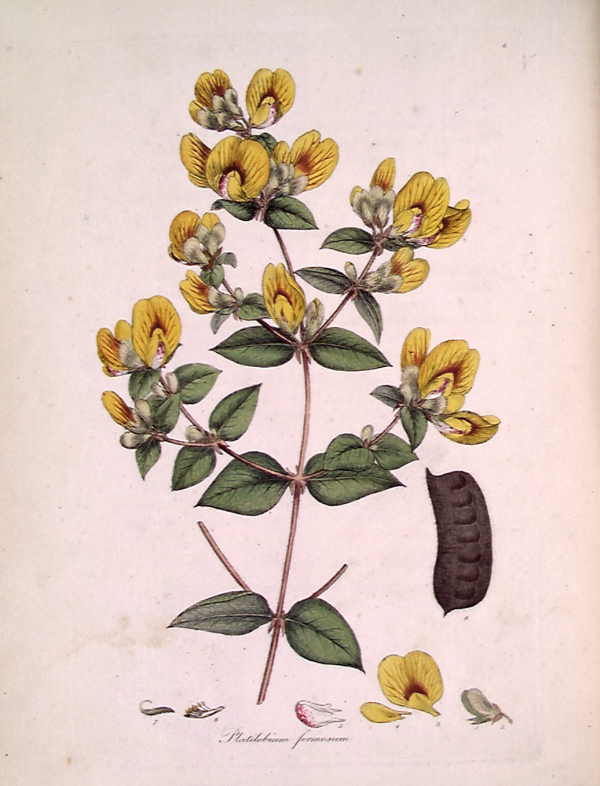
- Hand-coloured engraving by James Sowerby from A Specimen of the Botany of New Holland
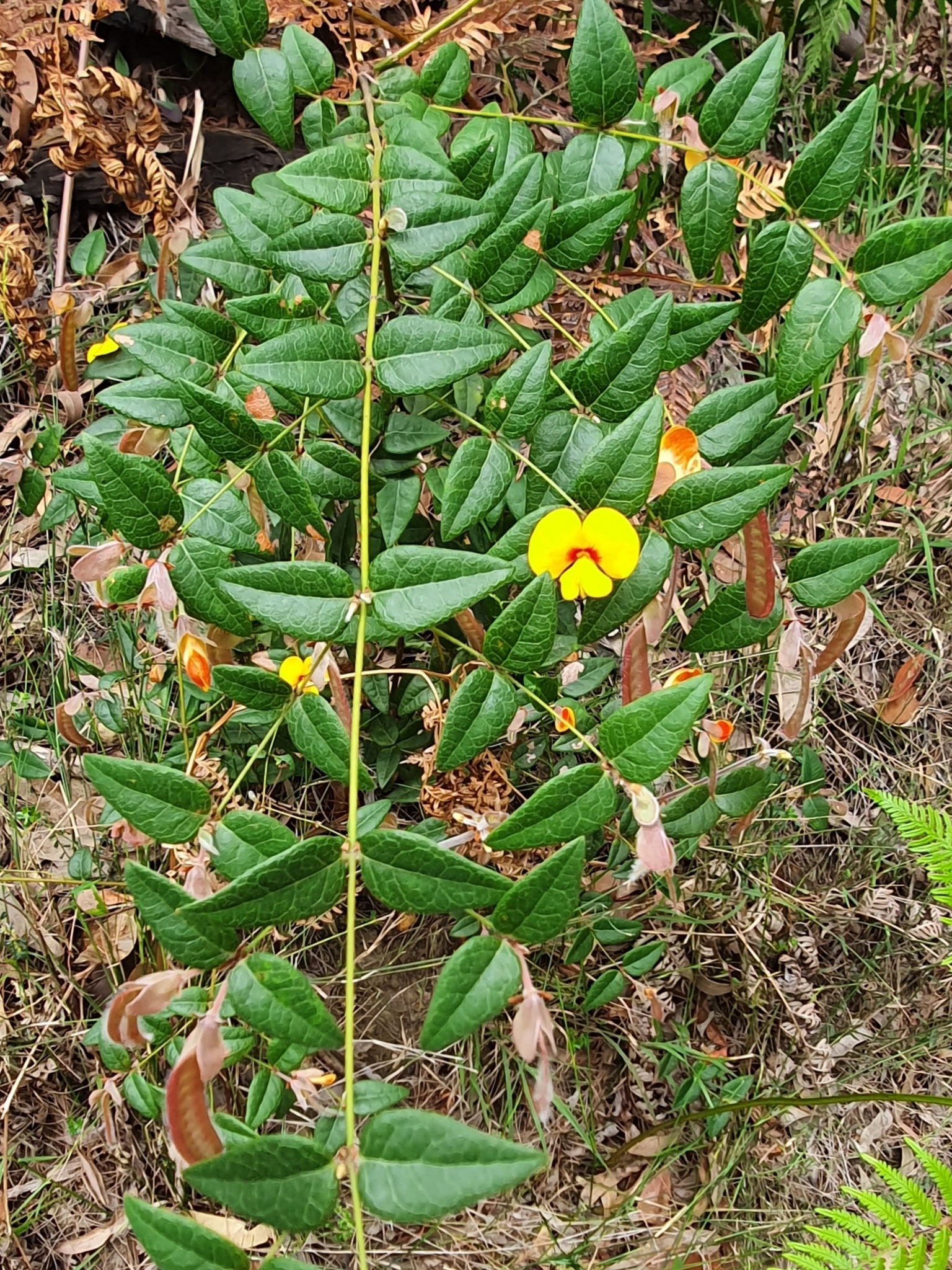
- Living specimen

Scientific classification
- Kingdom: Plantae
- Clade: Embryophytes
- Clade: Tracheophytes
- Clade: Spermatophytes
- Clade: Angiosperms
- Clade: Eudicots
- Clade: Rosids
- Order: Fabales
- Family: Fabaceae
- Subfamily: Faboideae
- Genus: Platylobium
- Species: P. formosum

Binomial name
- Platylobium formosum Sm.

= Platylobium formosum =

Handsome flat-pea

Species of legume

Platylobium formosum, also known as handsome flat-pea, is a shrub that is endemic to Australia. It is a member of the family Fabaceae and of the genus Platylobium.

== Description ==
The species is an erect or straggling shrub with wiry stems which usually grows to a height of between 1 and 2 metres. The leaves are opposite with very short, almost unnoticeable petioles. The leaf surface has a pronounced reticulation of veins on the surface and is dark green above and lighter below. The leaf size ranges from 2 to 5 cm in length and 1 to 2.3 cm in width.

The flowers appear in spring, between September and November in their native range. These are orange-yellow with a red centre, with red markings in the centre, on the tip of the keel and on the back of the standard. and are supported by a long stalk which is covered by hairs and arises from the leaf axil. The pods which follow are flat, glabrous or hairy and about 2 to 4 cm in length.

== Taxonomy ==
The species was first formally described by botanist James Edward Smith in 1793 in A Specimen of the Botany of New Holland. The specific epithet formosum is derived from the Latin word for beautiful.

Following a taxonomic review of the genus Platylobium in 2011, plants in Victoria formerly known by this name have been reclassified as P. infecundum, P. montanum, P. parviflorum, P. reflexum or P. rotundum. Plants in Tasmania previously known as P. formosum subsp. parviflorum have been reclassified as Platylobium parviflorum.

== Distribution ==
This species is found in New South Wales and Queensland. It is common and widespread in habitats ranging from heathland to rainforest margins.
