= Platylobium triangulare =

Scientific classification
- Kingdom: Plantae
- Clade: Tracheophytes
- Clade: Angiosperms
- Clade: Eudicots
- Clade: Rosids
- Order: Fabales
- Family: Fabaceae
- Subfamily: Faboideae
- Genus: Platylobium
- Species: P. triangulare

Binomial name
- Platylobium triangulare R.Br.

Species of legume

Platylobium triangulare , commonly known as ivy flat-pea, is a shrub species that is endemic to Australia. It is a member of the family Fabaceae and of the genus Platylobium. The species was formally described in 1812 by botanist Robert Brown in Hortus Kewensis. The type specimen was collected in Tasmania by Brown.

Platylobium triangulare is a more-or-less prostrate shrub with sharply triangular leaves 1.2 - 2 cm long. It is reasonably common in sandy heaths in the east and north of the state.

The species has often been misidentified as Platylobium obtusangulum.
