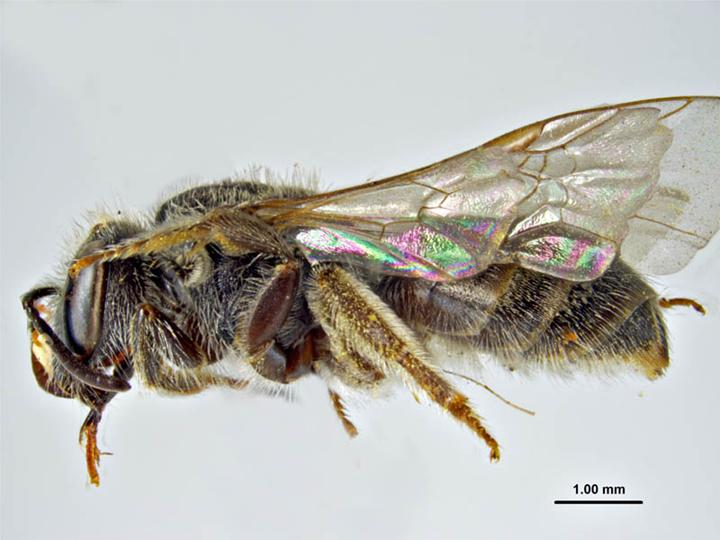
- Female
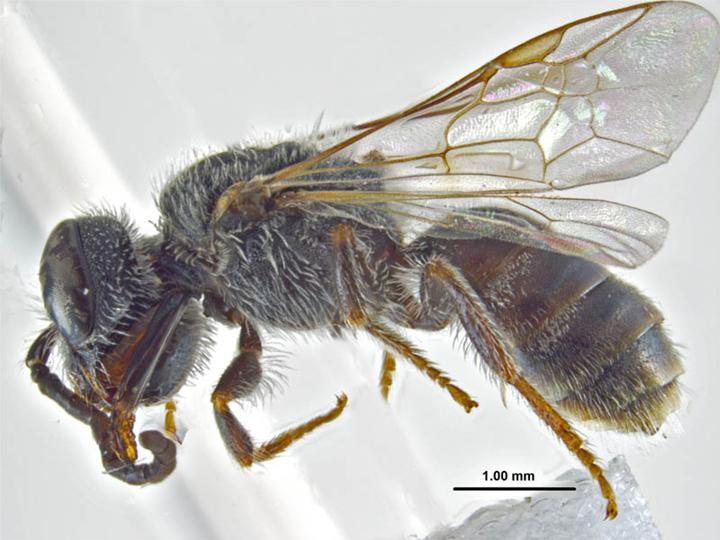
- Male

Scientific classification
- Kingdom: Animalia
- Phylum: Arthropoda
- Clade: Pancrustacea
- Class: Insecta
- Order: Hymenoptera
- Family: Halictidae
- Genus: Lasioglossum
- Species: L. clelandi

Binomial name
- Lasioglossum clelandi (Cockerell, 1910)

Synonyms
- Halictus clelandi Cockerell, 1910; Halictus granulithorax Cockerell, 1914; Halictus idoneus Cockerell, 1914

= Lasioglossum clelandi =

Species of bee

Lasioglossum clelandi, or Lasioglossum (Chilalictus) clelandi, is a species of bee in the family Halictidae and subfamily Halictinae. It is endemic to Australia. It was described by British-American entomologist Theodore Dru Alison Cockerell in 1910.

== Description ==
Male body length is about 6 mm. Integumental colouration is mainly black, abdomen and legs dark reddish-brown. The hair is greyish-white.

== Distribution and habitat ==
The species occurs in south-eastern Australia. Type localities include Victoria, Brisbane and Adelaide.

== Behaviour ==
The adults are flying mellivores. Flowering plants visited by the bees include Acacia, Angophora, Bossiaea, Brassica, Bursaria, Calytrix, Daviesia, Dillwynia, Eucalyptus, Goodenia, Syncarpha, Hibbertia, Hypochaeris, Jacksonia, Leptospermum, Medicago, Platylobium, Pultenaea, Schinus, Senecio, Taraxacum, Thelymitra, Trifolium, Tristaniopsis, Wahlenbergia, Watsonia and Xanthorrhoea species.
