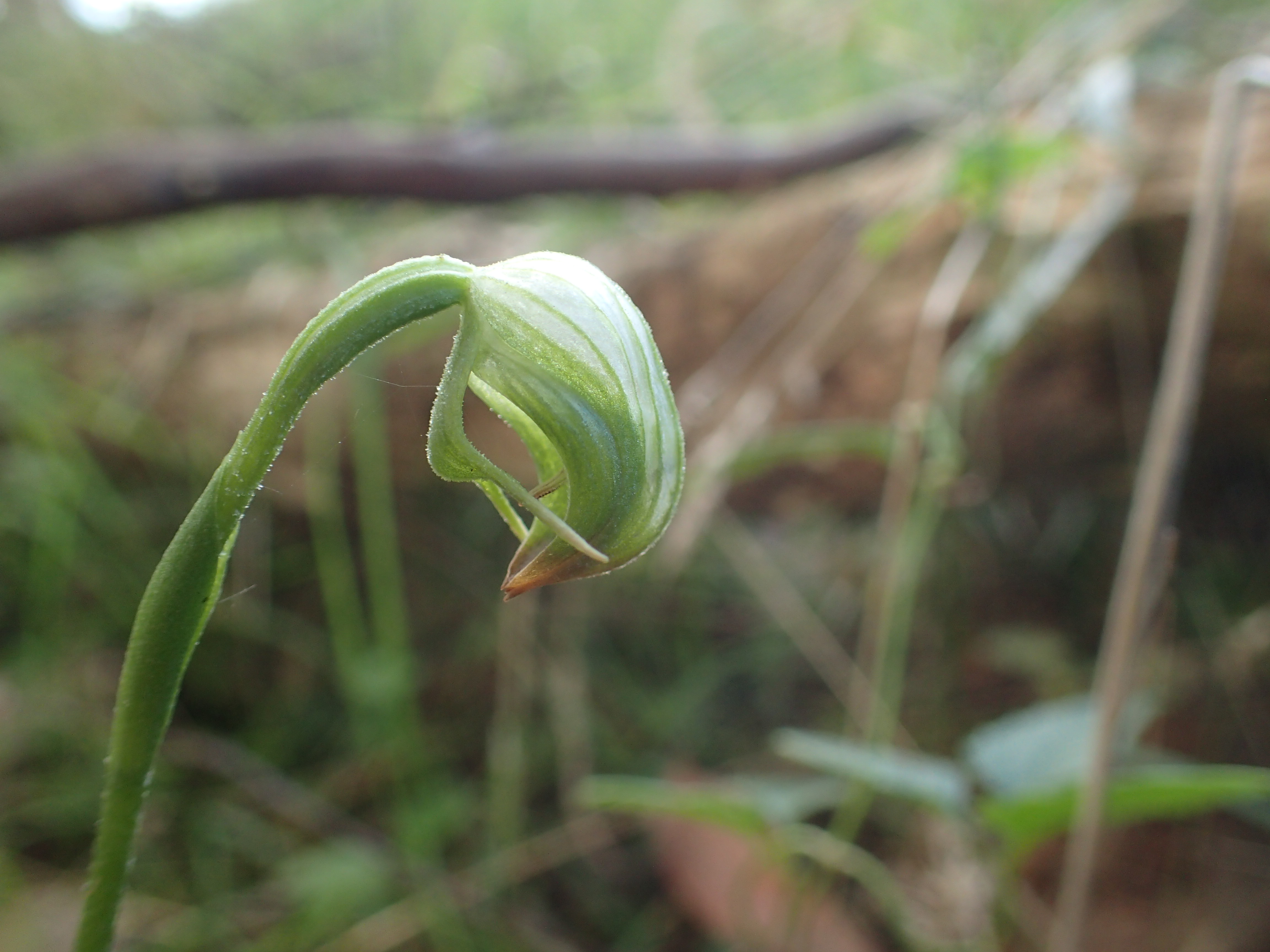
- Pterostylis hispidula growing near Ebor

Conservation status
- Least Concern (IUCN 3.1)

Scientific classification
- Kingdom: Plantae
- Clade: Tracheophytes
- Clade: Angiosperms
- Clade: Monocots
- Order: Asparagales
- Family: Orchidaceae
- Subfamily: Orchidoideae
- Tribe: Cranichideae
- Genus: Pterostylis
- Species: P. hispidula

Binomial name
- Pterostylis hispidula Fitzg.

Synonyms
- Pterostylis nutans var. hispidula (Fitzg.) C.Moore & Betche

= Pterostylis hispidula =

Small nodding greenhood

Species of orchid

Pterostylis hispidula, commonly known as the small nodding greenhood or box greenhood, is a plant in the orchid family Orchidaceae and is endemic to eastern Australia. Nodding greenhoods have flowers which "nod" or lean forwards, have a deeply notched sinus and a curved, hairy labellum. This species is similar to Pterostylis nutans but is smaller and the flowers do not lean as far forward as in that species.

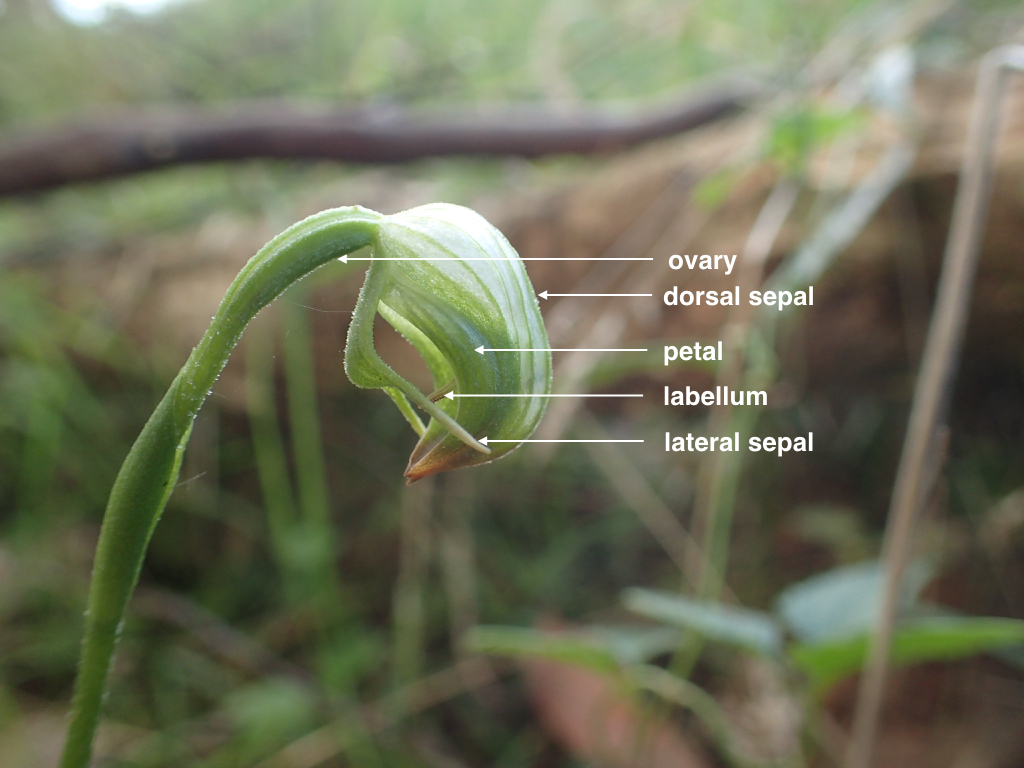
Labelled image of P. hispidula flower

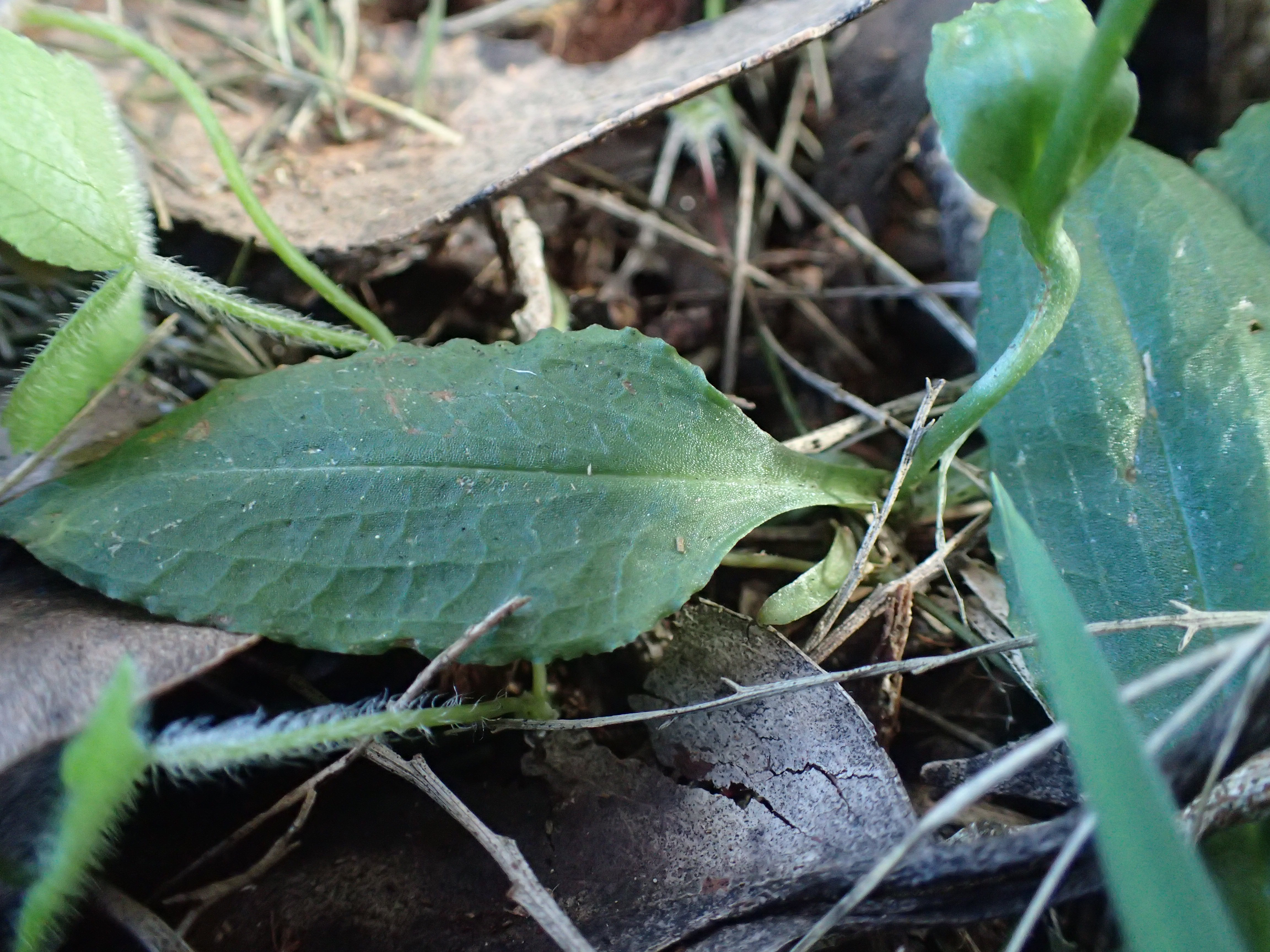
Leaf of P. hispidula

== Description ==
Pterostylis hispidula, is a terrestrial, perennial, deciduous, herb with an underground tuber. It has a rosette of between three and six egg-shaped to oblong leaves, each leaf 10–40 mm (0.4–2 in) long and 5–15 mm (0.2–0.6 in) wide. The leaves are green to yellowish, have a wavy or crinkled edge and a distinct petiole. A single translucent white flower with green stripes and a reddish tip is borne on a flowering spike 150–300 mm (6–10 in) high, the flower "nodding" or leaning forwards. The flowers are 14–18 mm (0.6–0.7 in) long, 8–10 mm (0.3–0.4 in) wide. There is a wide gap at each side of the flower between the petals and the lateral sepals. The lateral sepals have a tapering tip, 5–8 mm (0.2–0.3 in) long and there is a deeply notched sinus between them. The labellum protrudes from the flower and is 9–12 mm (0.4–0.5 in) long, about 2 mm (0.08 in) wide, curved, dark-coloured and covered with short, bristly hairs. Flowering occurs from March to July.

== Taxonomy and naming ==
Pterostylis hispidula was first formally described in 1880 by Robert D. FitzGerald who noted that he had only seen it in Hunters Hill in Sydney and at Springwood in the Blue Mountains. The specific epithet (hispidula) is a Latin word meaning "bristly", "rough", "hairy" or prickly".

== Distribution and habitat ==
Pterostylis hispidula occurs in Queensland south from Fraser Island to Batemans Bay in New South Wales. It grows in a range of habitats from coastal scrub to rainforest margins.
