= Platylobium alternifolium =

Scientific classification
- Kingdom: Plantae
- Clade: Tracheophytes
- Clade: Angiosperms
- Clade: Eudicots
- Clade: Rosids
- Order: Fabales
- Family: Fabaceae
- Subfamily: Faboideae
- Genus: Platylobium
- Species: P. alternifolium

Binomial name
- Platylobium alternifolium F.Muell.

Species of legume

Platylobium alternifolium, commonly known as Victorian flat-pea, is a shrub species endemic to Victoria, Australia. It is a member of the family Fabaceae and of the genus Platylobium. The species was formally described in 1883 by Victorian Government Botanist Ferdinand von Mueller based on plant material collected at Mount William, Mount Disappointment and Ben Nevis.
