= Hamilton Hume =

Australian explorer (1797–1873)

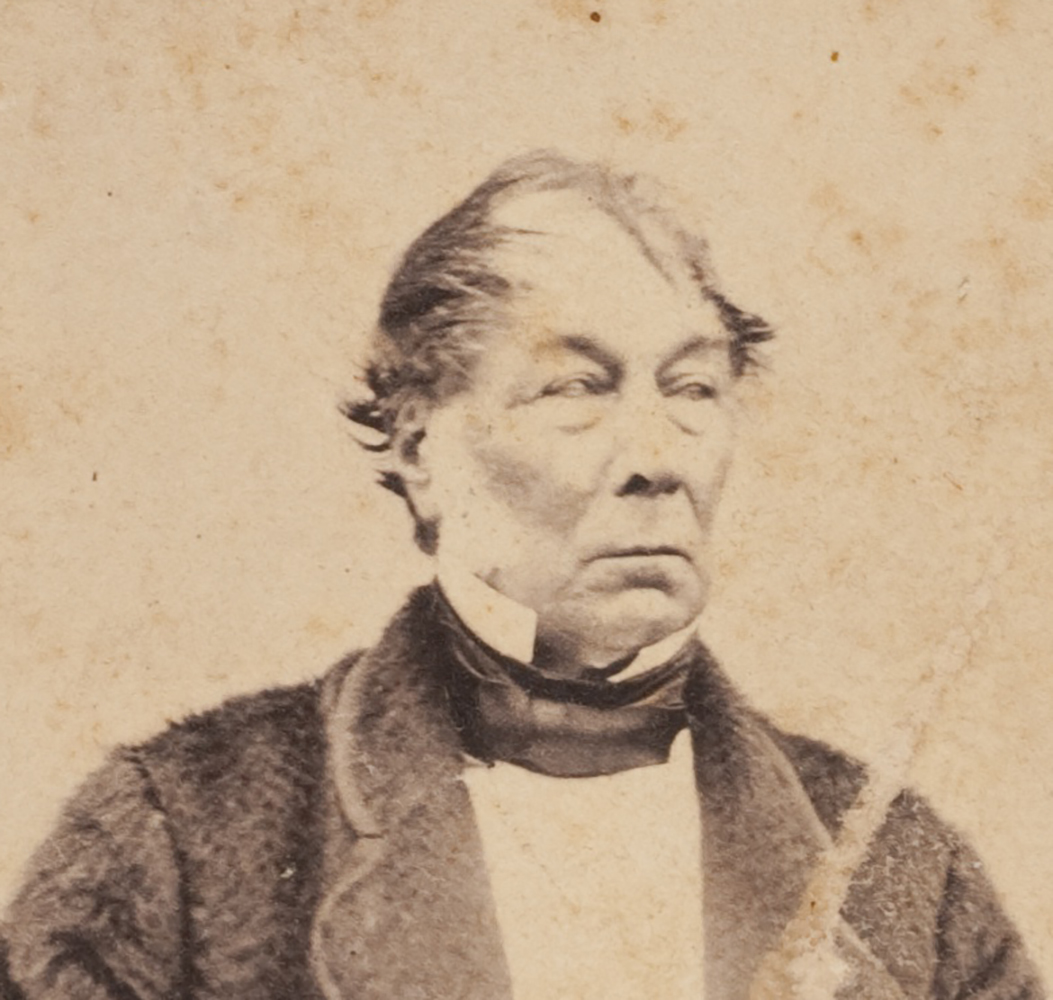
- Studio portrait of Hamilton Andrew Hume, ca. 1869
- Born: 19 June 1797; Seven Hills, Sydney, New South Wales, Australia
- Died: 19 April 1873 (aged 75); Yass, New South Wales, Australia
- Resting place: Yass, New South Wales, Australia
- Occupations: Explorer; Magistrate
- Years active: 1814−1873
- Known for: Hume and Hovell expedition
- Spouse: Elizabeth Dight (m. 1825)

Hamilton Hume (19 June 1797 – 19 April 1873) was an early explorer of the present-day Australian states of New South Wales and Victoria. In 1824, along with William Hovell, Hume participated in an expedition that first took an overland route from Sydney to Port Phillip (near the site of present-day Melbourne). Along with Sturt in 1828, he was part of an expedition of the first Europeans to find the Darling River.

== Background ==
Hume was born on 19 June 1797 in Seven Hills, near Parramatta, a settlement close to (and now part of Greater) Sydney. He was the eldest son of Andrew Hamilton Hume and his wife Elizabeth, née Kennedy. Andrew Hume got the appointment of Commissary-General for New South Wales, and came out to the colony in 1797.

== Exploratory career ==
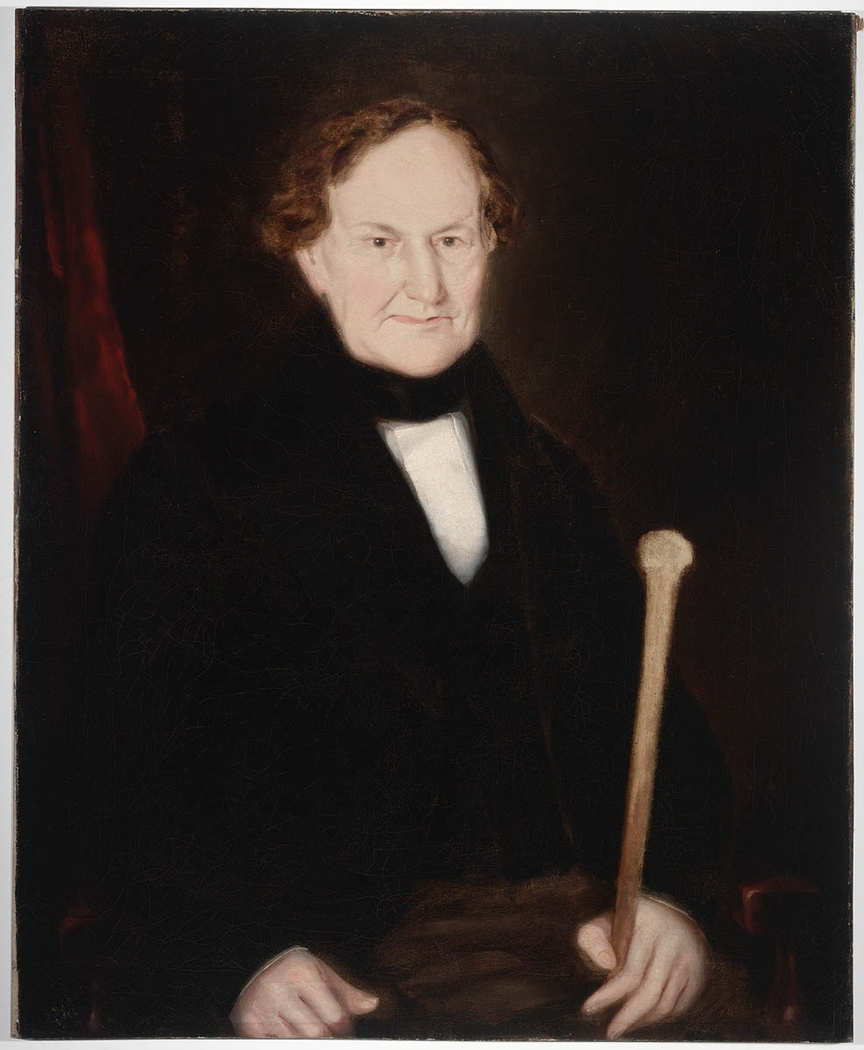
His father – Andrew Hamilton Hume, painted by Joseph Backler

=== Early exploration ===
As a teenager, Hume set out from his father's farm near Appin, New South Wales in 1814 and guided by a young local Indigenous man named Duall, they explored the southern highlands region as far as what is now the town of Berrima. In 1819 and 1821, Hume conducted further journeys of overland exploration with Duall and other Aboriginal guides and British colonists to Jervis Bay and Lake Bathurst.

In 1822, he journeyed with Alexander Berry down the south coast of New South Wales. He travelled as far south as the Clyde River, and inland nearly as far as Braidwood. Berry came to settle in the Shoalhaven, and in June 1822 he left Hume and a party of convicts to cut a 209-yard canal between the Shoalhaven River and the Crookhaven River to allow passage of boats into the Shoalhaven. This canal was Australia's first navigable canal, and the work was completed in 12 days. The canal today forms the main water flow of the Shoalhaven River.

=== Hume and Hovell expedition ===
In any event, the hoped-for government funding of the expedition was not forthcoming.

The party had to cross the major Murrumbidgee River, Murray River, Mitta Mitta River, Ovens River, and Goulburn River. Hovell had named the Murray River after Hume during the trip but Charles Sturt altered it to its current name in 1830.

Four days after crossing the Goulburn impassable country was reached. The party spent three days attempting to cross the Great Dividing Range at Mt Disappointment but were thwarted. Hume shifted direction to the West then reached lower land at the future township of Broadford on 12 December where they camped. Hume headed towards low ranges to the South and found a pass in that direction next day. He led the party across the Dividing Range at Hume’s Pass, Wandong and on 16 December 1824 reached Port Phillip Bay at Bird Rock, Point Lillias adjacent to the future Geelong. Hovell claimed that he measured their longitude on the same day but in reality he read it off the sketch map that he and Hume had drafted themselves during the trip. Hovell admitted in 1867 that he did not take any longitude measurements and blamed Hume for it. Prior to this admission, Dr William Bland, who wrote the first book on the journey in 1831, invented the myth that Hovell made an error of one degree in longitude in order to protect him.

The party turned back towards New South Wales on 18 December. Hume chose to travel more to the west to avoid the mountainous country and save considerable time. On 16 January 1825, just as their flour ran out, then two days later the safety of Hume's station at Gunning.

This expedition was the first to discover an overland route from southern New South Wales to Port Phillip, on whose shores Melbourne now stands.

=== Blue Mountains and Lithgow Valley ===
In 1827, accompanied by Lieutenant George M. C. Bowen, then an assistant surveyor, Hume explored the western part of the Blue Mountains—around the landform that he named the Darling Causeway, after Governor Ralph Darling—and found three passes through the western escarpment that would have avoided the steep Mt York route. During this period, he named the Lithgow Valley, after William Lithgow, who, at the time, was the Auditor-General of New South Wales.

=== Exploration of the Darling River ===
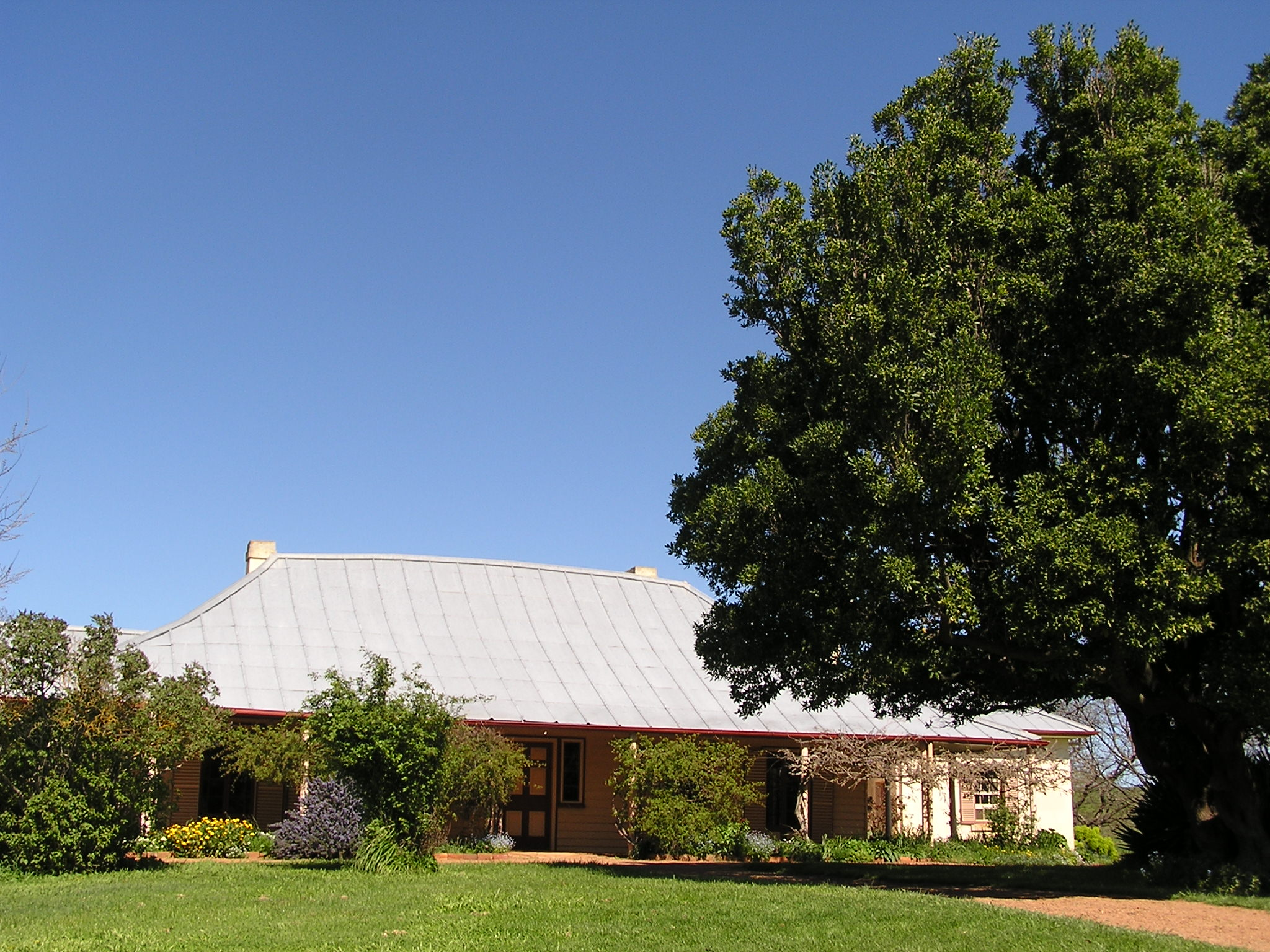
Hume's home: Cooma Cottage at Yass

In November 1828, Hume journeyed with Charles Sturt into western New South Wales, where they found the Darling River, the Murray River's longest tributary.

== Later life ==
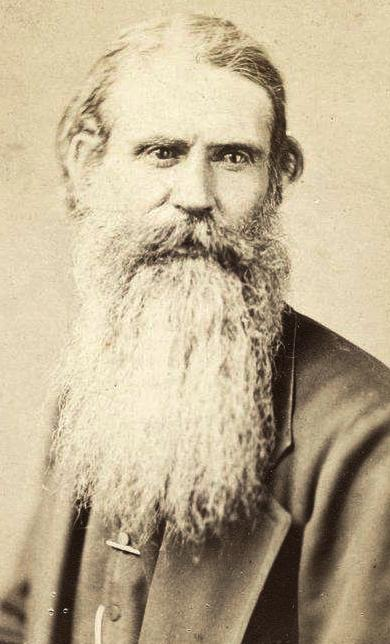
Hume in later life

Hume married Elizabeth Dight on 8 November 1825 at St Philip's Church in Sydney. She survived him but had no children.

Hume served as a magistrate in Yass until his death at his residence, Cooma Cottage in Yass on 19 April 1873. A double seater buggy once owned by Hume and used by him in Yass is in the National Museum of Australia collection in Canberra.

== Honours ==
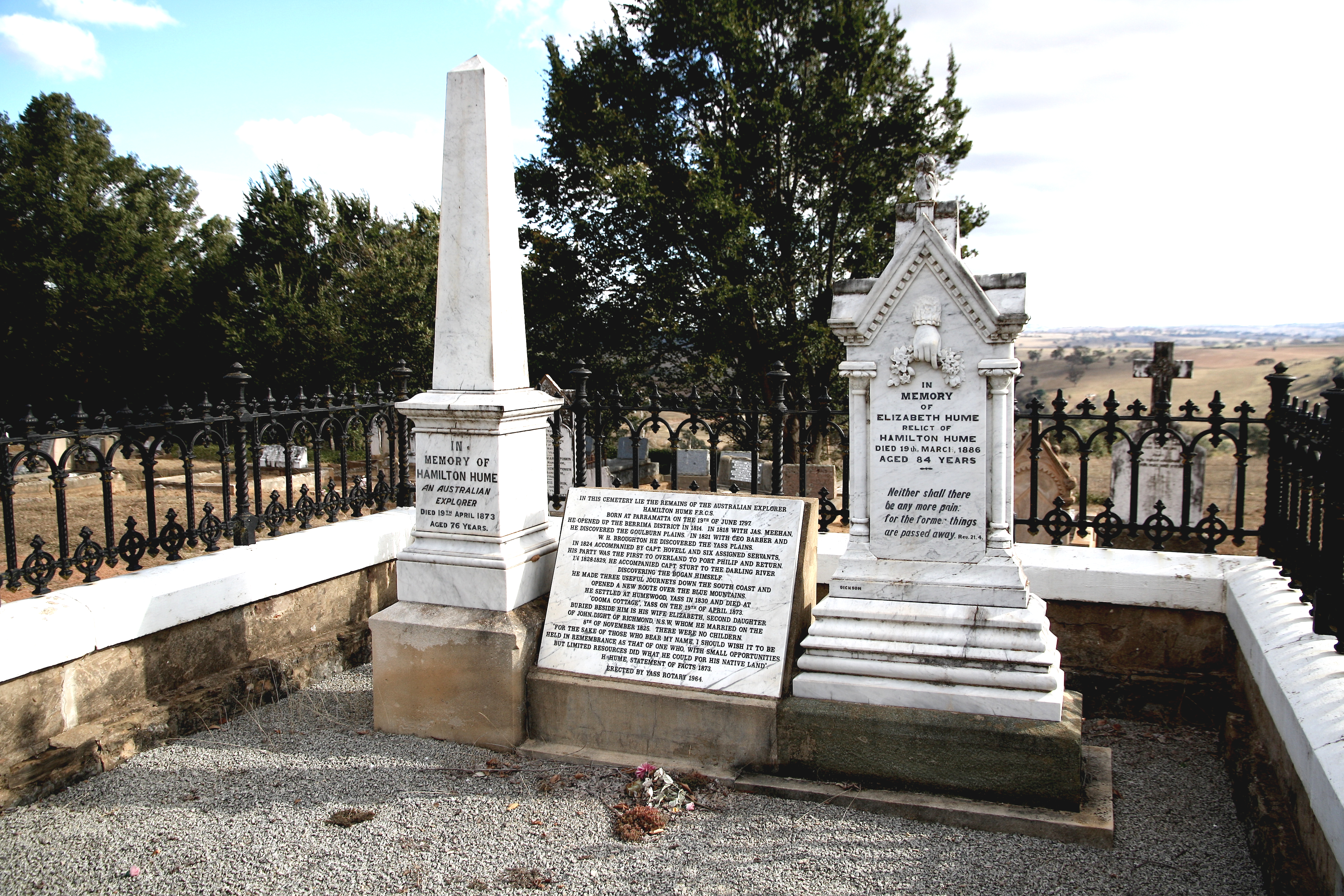
Grave and memorial of Hume and his wife Elizabeth, Yass Cemetery

Hume is commemorated by the Hume Highway, the principal road between Sydney and Melbourne. Hume and Hovell were also commemorated by having their portraits printed on the Australian one-pound banknote between 1953 and 1966. Hume Dam and the impounded reservoir, Lake Hume, were named in his honour in 1996. The Canberra suburb of Hume was named after him, as was the federal electoral Division of Hume. The City of Hume, an outer metropolitan council in Melbourne formed in 1994, is named in his honour.

In 1976 a postage stamp bearing the portraits of Hume and Hovell was issued by Australia Post. The Hume and Hovell Track, a 440-kilometre (270 mi) trail between Yass and Albury, also bears their joint names.

== See also ==
- Hume and Hovell expedition

== Notes ==
The Story of John Byrne, Freeman's Journal Thursday 11 June 1908, p. 32
