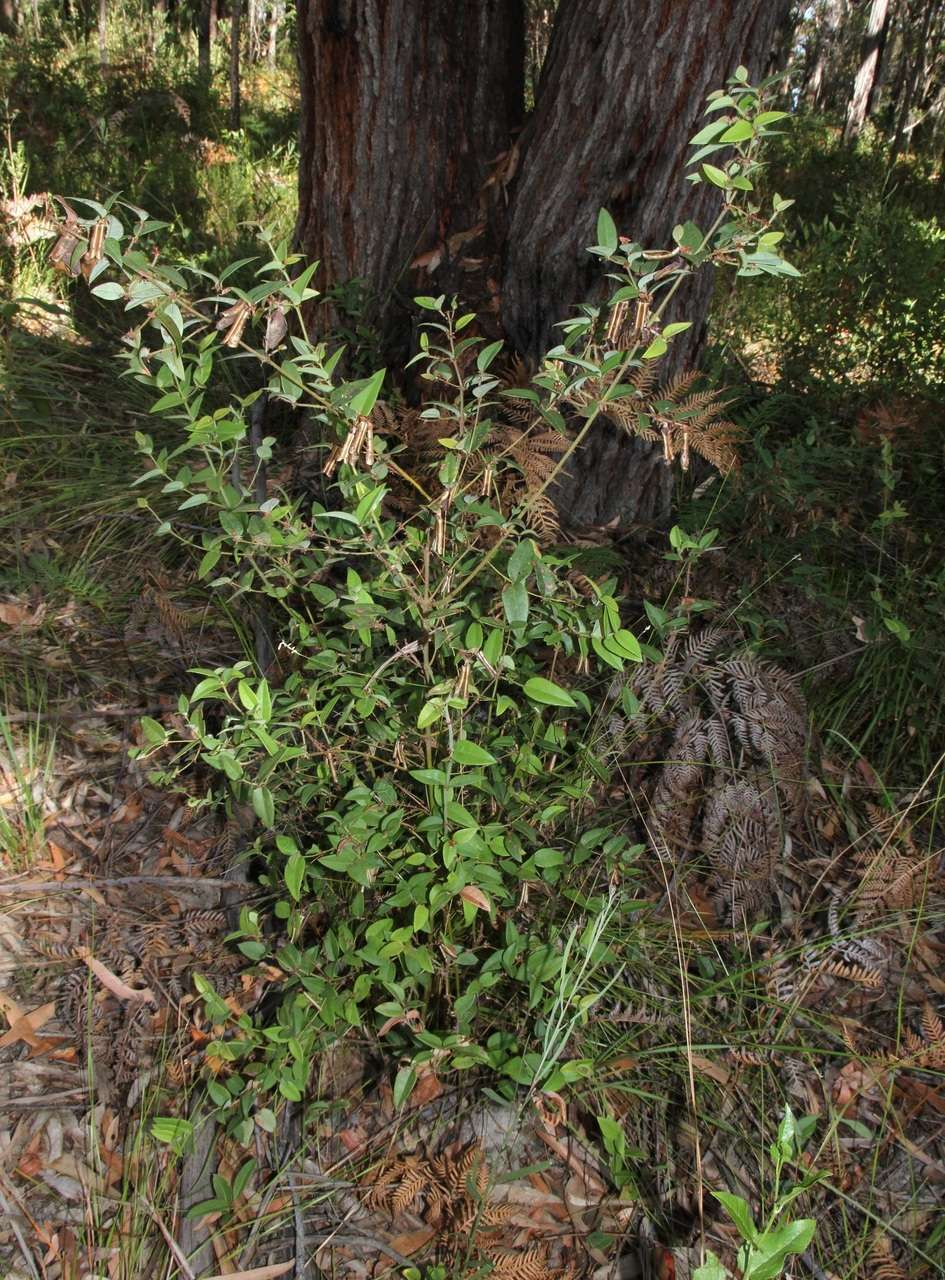
- Growing wild in Croajingolong National Park, Victoria, Australia.

Scientific classification
- Kingdom: Plantae
- Clade: Tracheophytes
- Clade: Angiosperms
- Clade: Eudicots
- Clade: Rosids
- Order: Fabales
- Family: Fabaceae
- Subfamily: Faboideae
- Genus: Platylobium
- Species: P. parviflorum

Binomial name
- Platylobium parviflorum Sm.

= Platylobium parviflorum =

Species of legume

Platylobium parviflorum is a shrub species that is endemic to Australia. It is a member of the family Fabaceae and of the genus Platylobium. The species was first formally described in 1795 by English botanist James Edward Smith but for many years was included in Platylobium formosum. It was reinstated as a species in its own right in 2011.
