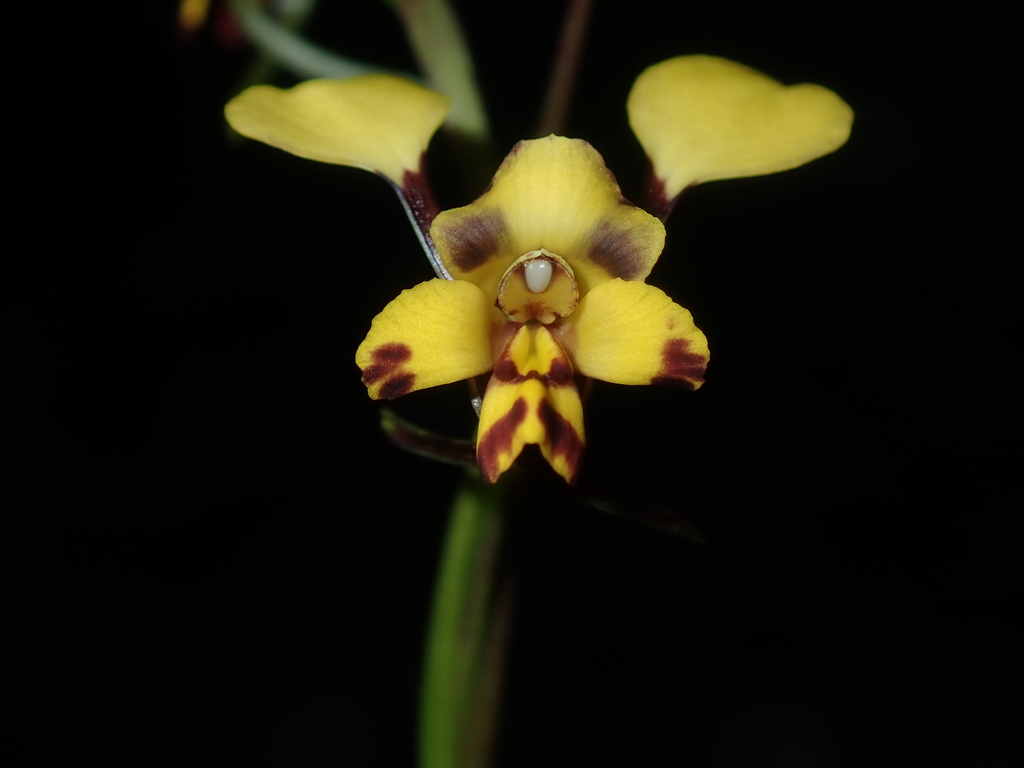
- In a Sydney suburb

Scientific classification
- Kingdom: Plantae
- Clade: Embryophytes
- Clade: Tracheophytes
- Clade: Angiosperms
- Clade: Monocots
- Order: Asparagales
- Family: Orchidaceae
- Subfamily: Orchidoideae
- Tribe: Diurideae
- Genus: Diuris
- Species: D. maculata

Binomial name
- Diuris maculata Sm.

Synonyms
- Diuris maculata Sm. var. maculata

= Diuris maculata =

Species of orchid

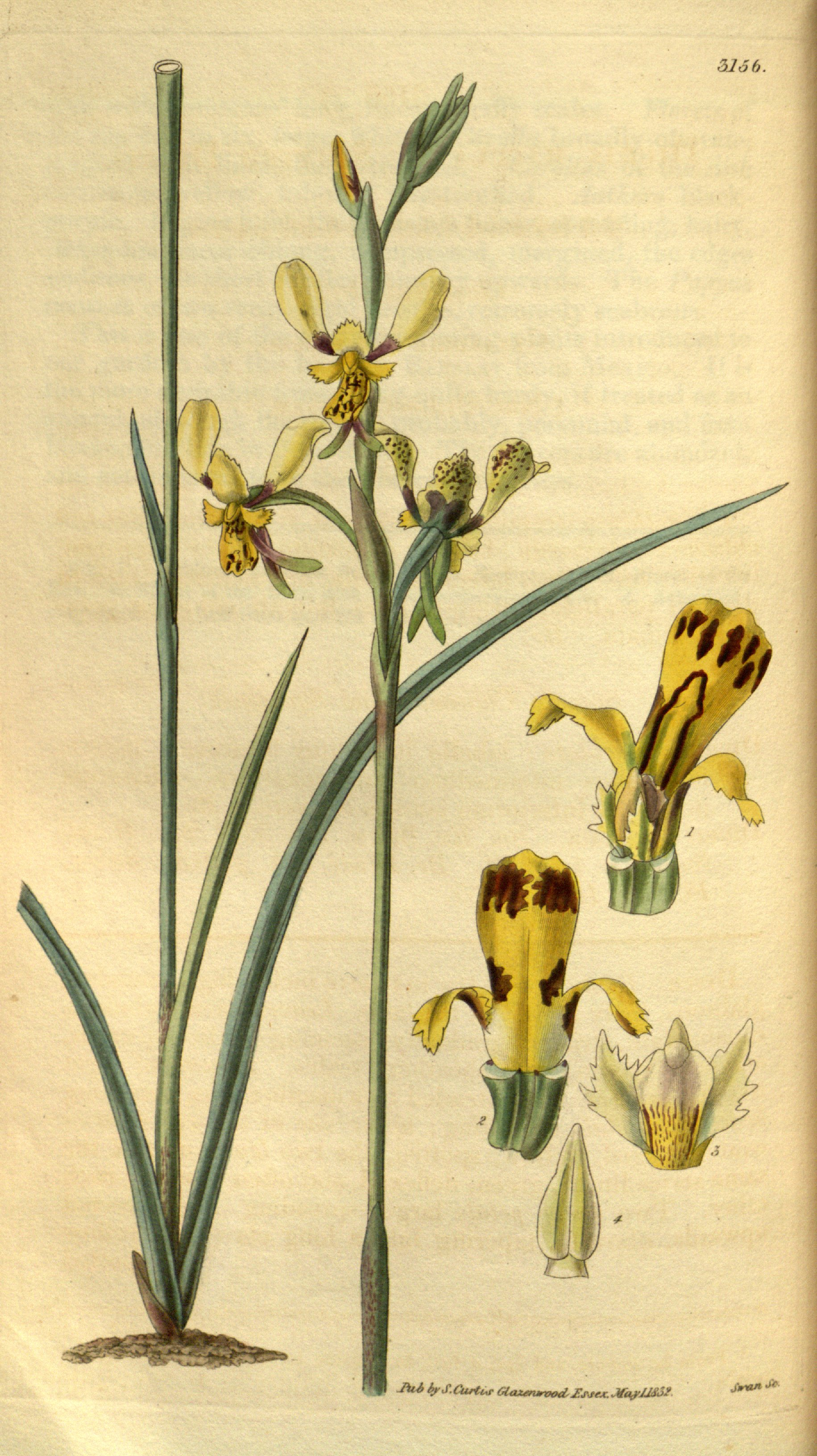
Illustration from Curtis's Botanical Magazine

Diuris maculata, commonly known as the spotted doubletail, is a species of orchid endemic to New South Wales. It has up to two or three folded leaves and a flowering stem with up to eight yellow flowers with brown to blackish markings. It is similar to D. pardina which has darker flowers with larger brown markings.

== Description ==
Diuris maculata is a tuberous, perennial herb with two or three linear leaves 150–250 mm (5.9–9.8 in) long, 3–4 mm (0.12–0.16 in) wide and folded lengthwise. Between two and eight flowers 20–25 mm (0.79–0.98 in) wide are borne on a flowering stem 150–350 mm (5.9–13.8 in) tall. The flowers are yellow with dark brown to blackish spots on all flower parts, sometimes on the reverse side. The dorsal sepal is erect or curved forwards, 7–10 mm (0.28–0.39 in) long and 5–7 mm (0.20–0.28 in) wide. The lateral sepals are linear to lance-shaped, 10–15 mm (0.39–0.59 in) long, about 2 mm (0.079 in) wide, turned downwards and crossed. The petals are erect to curved backwards, with an egg-shaped blade 7–11 mm (0.28–0.43 in) long and 6–9 mm (0.24–0.35 in) wide on a blackish stalk 4–7 mm (0.16–0.28 in) long. The labellum is 4–6 mm (0.16–0.24 in) long and has three lobes. The centre lobe is wedge-shaped, 3–5 mm (0.12–0.20 in) long and 5–7 mm (0.20–0.28 in) wide and the side lobes are 4–7 mm (0.16–0.28 in) long and 2–3 mm (0.079–0.118 in) wide. There are two ridged calli about 4–7 mm (0.16–0.28 in) long in the mid-line of the labellum. The species is similar to D. pardina but has lighter coloured flowers with smaller brown markings. Flowering occurs from July to November.

== Taxonomy and naming ==
Diuris maculata was first formally described in 1805 by James Edward Smith and the description was published in Volume 1 of his book, Exotic Botany. The specific epithet (maculata) is a Latin word meaning "spotted".

== Distribution and habitat ==
The spotted doubletail grows in shrubby forest and heath between Taree and Eden, mainly in coastal and near-coastal areas.

== Ecology ==
This orchid has been shown to mimic the flowers of several native peas, including Hardenbergia violacea and Daviesia ulicifolia. The native bee Trichocolletes venustus visits both orchid and peas flowers and obtains food from the pea but not from the orchid, which even has a UV nectar guide similar to that on the peas.
