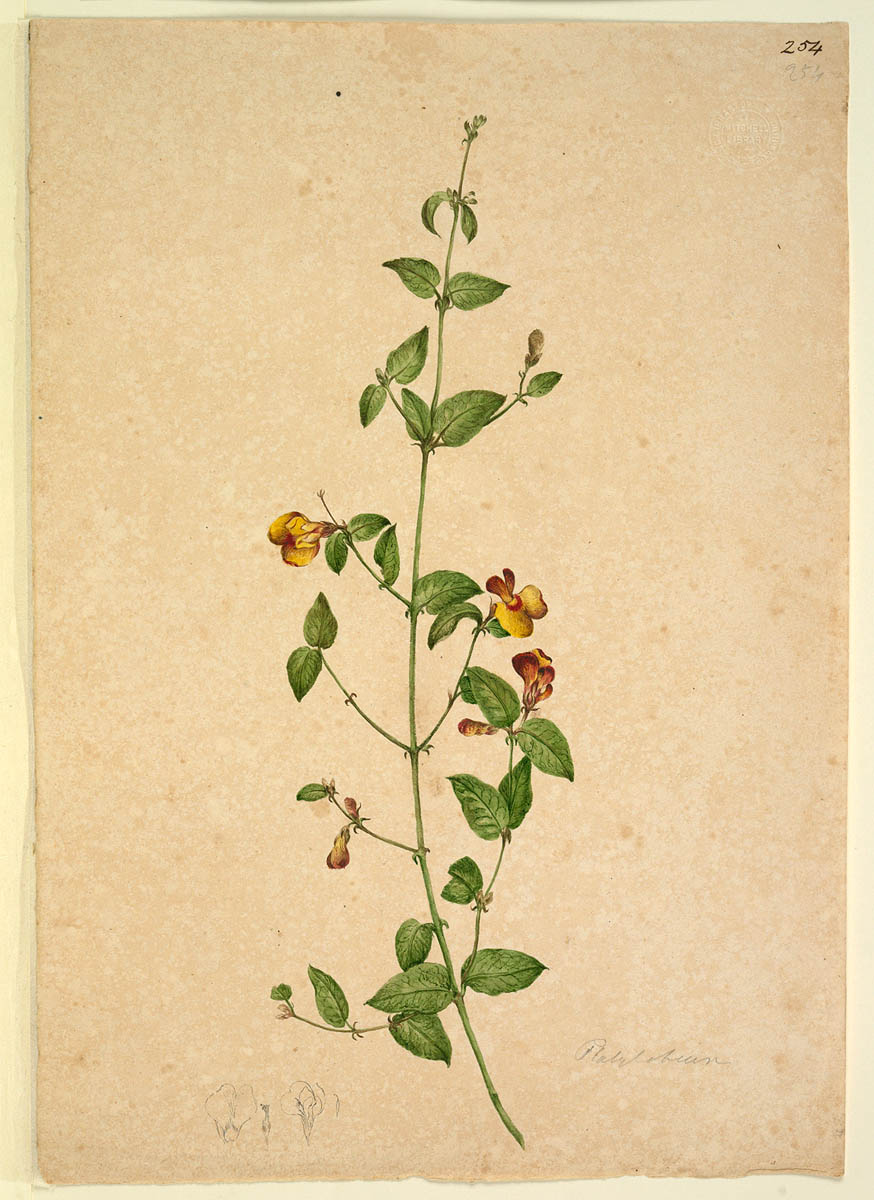
- Platylobium Watercolour (1803–1808?) by John Lewin

Scientific classification
- Kingdom: Plantae
- Clade: Tracheophytes
- Clade: Angiosperms
- Clade: Eudicots
- Clade: Rosids
- Order: Fabales
- Family: Fabaceae
- Subfamily: Faboideae
- Clade: Mirbelioids
- Genus: Platylobium; Sm. (1793)

Species
- See text

Synonyms
- Cheilococca Salisb. ex Sm. (1793)

= Platylobium =

Genus of legumes

Platylobium is a genus of shrubs in the legume family, Fabaceae. Native to eastern and south eastern Australia, they occur in a range of habitats of the coastal regions. The genus was first described by James Edward Smith, and is closely allied to Bossiaea, another genus within the Mirbelioids.

The plants within this and other genera of the Mirbelioids are well known. They often have a common name that alludes to the oblongate pod described in the binary name—such as 'flat pea'—or by its exhibition of a yellow, orange, and pinky-red fluorescence—'eggs and bacon' peas. Papery dark brown scales support the banner of the pea's flower, this completes the semblance to a cooked breakfast. These flowers are displayed on rambling branches, sometimes as a short shrub, often extending prostrate. They range inland in coastal regions Southern and Eastern Australia, including Tasmania.

Platylobium is found to have a distinct wing on the pod, this distinguishes the genus from that of Bossiaea. Examination of the ovate leaves, distinction in the brown papery parts near the bract and diversion in the form of various parts will allow identification of the two species described below.

== Species ==
Platylobium comprises the following species:

- Platylobium alternifolium F.Muell. — Victorian flat-pea
- Platylobium formosum Sm. — Handsome flat-pea
- Platylobium infecundum I.Thomps.
- Platylobium montanum I.Thomps.
- Platylobium obtusangulum Hook. — Common flat-pea
- Platylobium parviflorum Sm.
- Platylobium reflexum I.Thomps.
- Platylobium rotundum I.Thomps.
- Platylobium triangulare R.Br. — Ivy flat-pea
