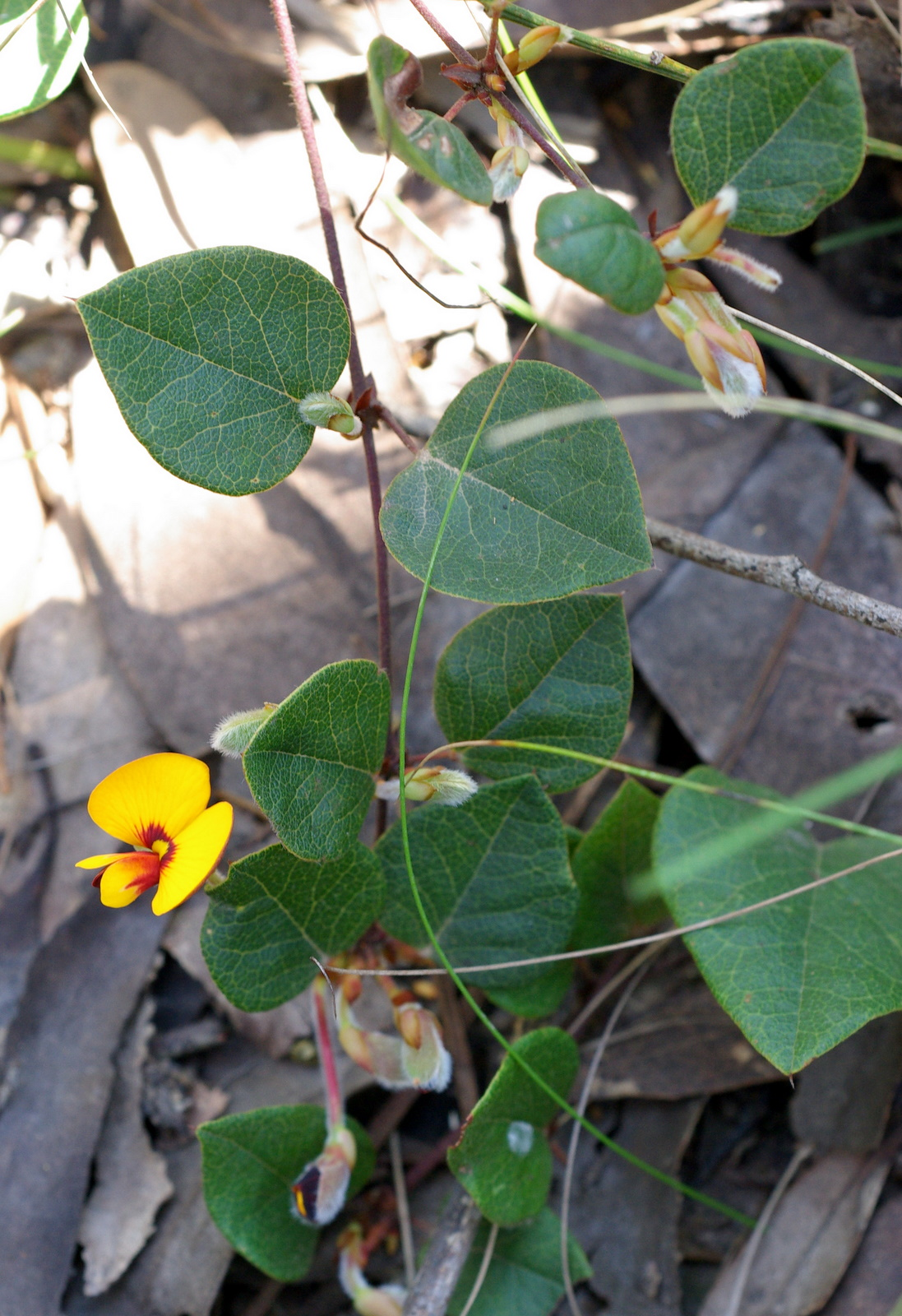

Scientific classification
- Kingdom: Plantae
- Clade: Tracheophytes
- Clade: Angiosperms
- Clade: Eudicots
- Clade: Rosids
- Order: Fabales
- Family: Fabaceae
- Subfamily: Faboideae
- Genus: Platylobium
- Species: P. montanum

Binomial name
- Platylobium montanum I.Thomps.

= Platylobium montanum =

Species of legume

Platylobium montanum is a shrub species that is endemic to Australia. It is a member of the family Fabaceae and of the genus Platylobium. The species was first formally described in 2011.

Two subspecies are currently recognised:

- Platylobium montanum I.Thomps. subsp. montanum (Type: Wabonga Plateau)
- Platylobium montanum subsp. prostratum I.Thomps. (Type: Kinglake National Park)
