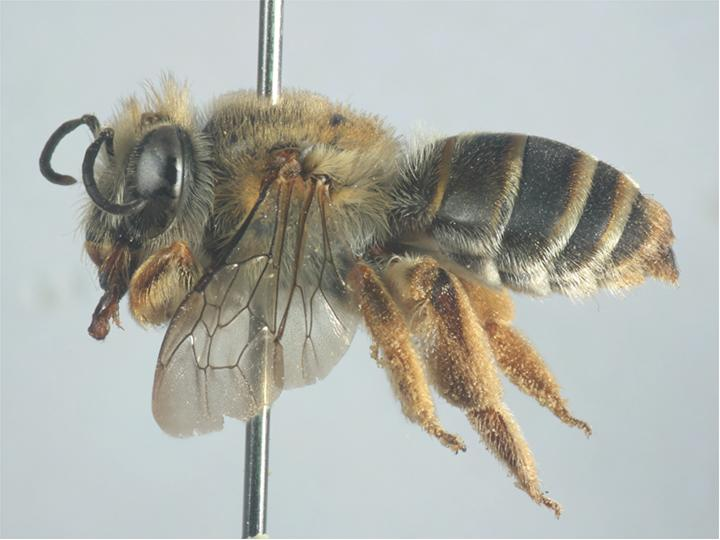
- Female

Scientific classification
- Kingdom: Animalia
- Phylum: Arthropoda
- Clade: Pancrustacea
- Class: Insecta
- Order: Hymenoptera
- Family: Colletidae
- Genus: Trichocolletes
- Species: T. venustus

Binomial name
- Trichocolletes venustus (Smith, 1862)

Synonyms
- Lamprocolletes venustus Smith, 1862; Trichocolletes nigroclypeatus Rayment, 1929; Trichocolletes daviesiae Rayment, 1931

= Trichocolletes venustus =

Species of bee

Trichocolletes venustus is a species of bee in the family Colletidae and the subfamily Colletinae. It is endemic to Australia. It was described in 1862 by English entomologist Frederick Smith.

== Distribution and habitat ==
The species occurs across southern Australia. Type localities include Lower Plenty, Heathmont and Daylesford in Victoria.

== Behaviour ==
The adults are solitary flying mellivores with sedentary larvae that nest gregariously in soil. Flowering plants visited by the bees include Dillwynia, Aotus, Daviesia, Comesperma, Hardenbergia, Hovea, Mirbelia, Pultenaea and Leptospermum species.

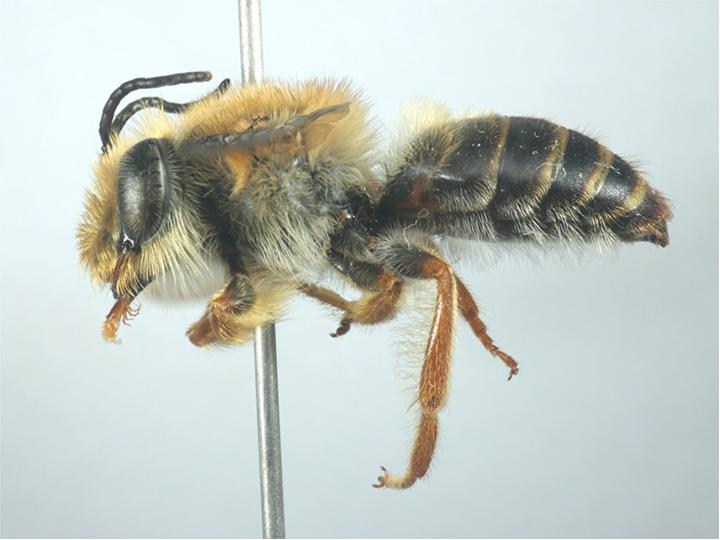
Male
