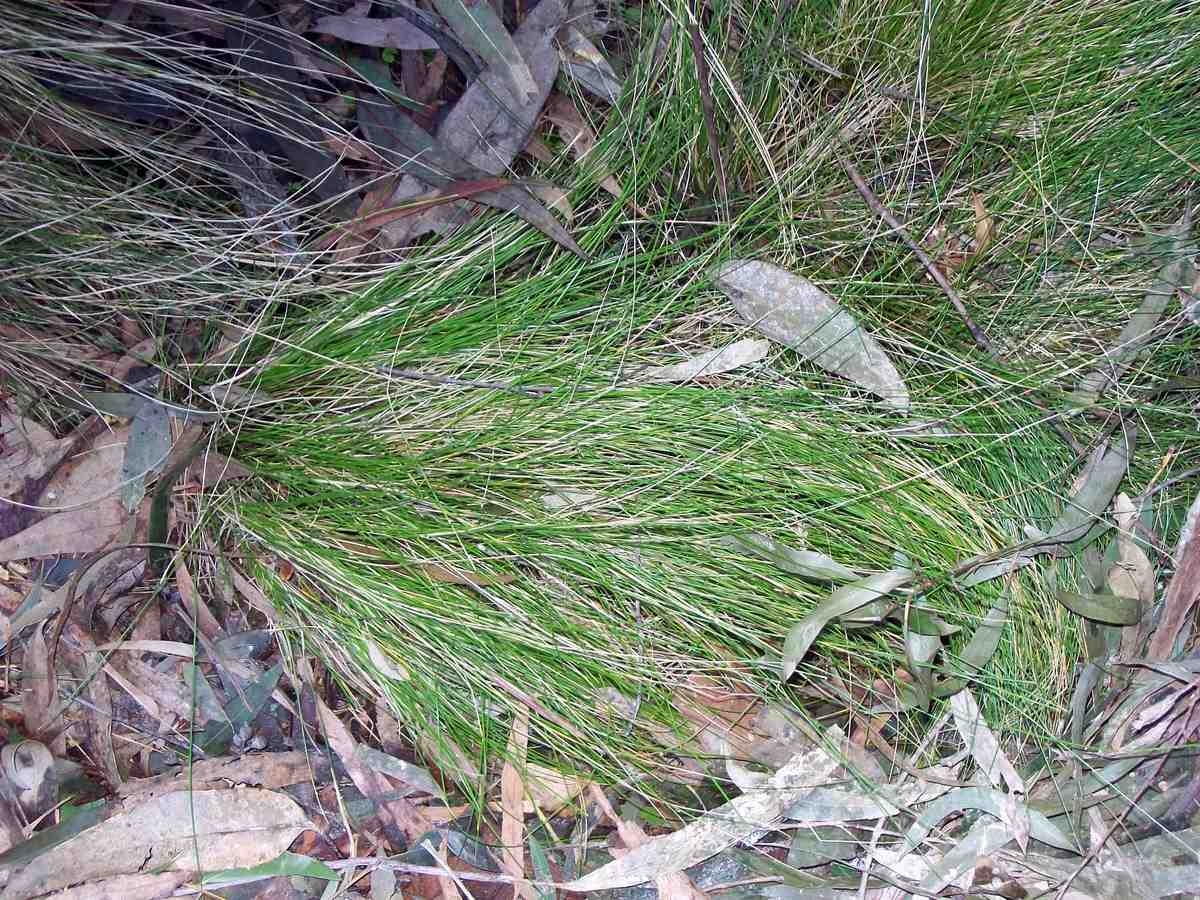

Scientific classification
- Kingdom: Plantae
- Clade: Tracheophytes
- Clade: Angiosperms
- Clade: Monocots
- Clade: Commelinids
- Order: Poales
- Family: Poaceae
- Subfamily: Pooideae
- Genus: Poa
- Species: P. meionectes

Binomial name
- Poa meionectes Vickery

= Poa meionectes =

Fine-leaved snow grass

Species of grass

Poa meionectes, known as the fine-leaved snow grass, is a tufted grass native to south eastern Australia. It grows to 70 cm high, leaves are 0.3 mm wide. It occurs south of Orange, New South Wales. Flowering occurs in spring and summer. Often found on eucalyptus woodland in coastal ranges.

The original specimen was collected in 1970 by J. Vickery near Six Mile Creek, Tantawangalo mountain, in South East Forest National Park.
