= Platylobium infecundum =

Scientific classification
- Kingdom: Plantae
- Clade: Tracheophytes
- Clade: Angiosperms
- Clade: Eudicots
- Clade: Rosids
- Order: Fabales
- Family: Fabaceae
- Subfamily: Faboideae
- Genus: Platylobium
- Species: P. infecundum

Binomial name
- Platylobium infecundum I.Thomps.

Species of legume

Platylobium infecundum is a shrub species that is endemic to Victoria, Australia. It is a member of the family Fabaceae and of the genus Platylobium. The species was first formally described in 2011. The type specimen was collected from Heathmont.
