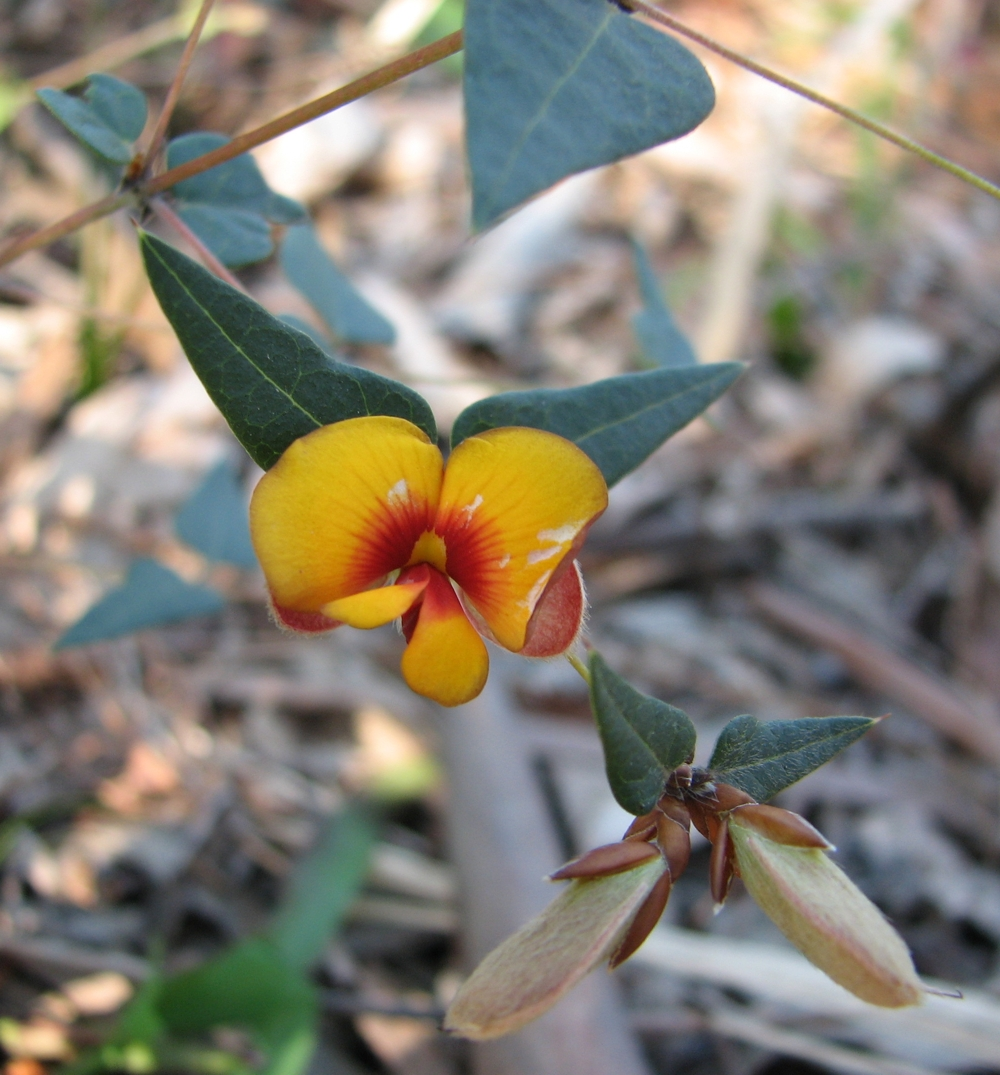

Scientific classification
- Kingdom: Plantae
- Clade: Tracheophytes
- Clade: Angiosperms
- Clade: Eudicots
- Clade: Rosids
- Order: Fabales
- Family: Fabaceae
- Subfamily: Faboideae
- Genus: Platylobium
- Species: P. obtusangulum

Binomial name
- Platylobium obtusangulum Hook.

Synonyms
- Platylobium macrocalyx Meisn. Platylobium obtusangulum var. spinulosum J.H.Willis

= Platylobium obtusangulum =

Common flat-pea

Species of plant

Platylobium obtusangulum, the common flat-pea, is a shrub that is endemic to Australia. It is a member of the family Fabaceae and of the genus Platylobium.

The species is an erect or straggling shrub that can grow up to 1 metre in height. The leaves are variable in shape and their length ranges from 1 to 3 cm.

The flowers appear in spring. These are yellow with a red centre and are supported by short pedicels that are concealed by a series of overlapping bracts. The pods which follow are 14 to 25 mm in length and 10 to 14 mm in width.

The species was first formally described by botanist William Jackson Hooker in 1833 in Botanical Magazine

This species is found in South Australia, Tasmania, and Victoria.
