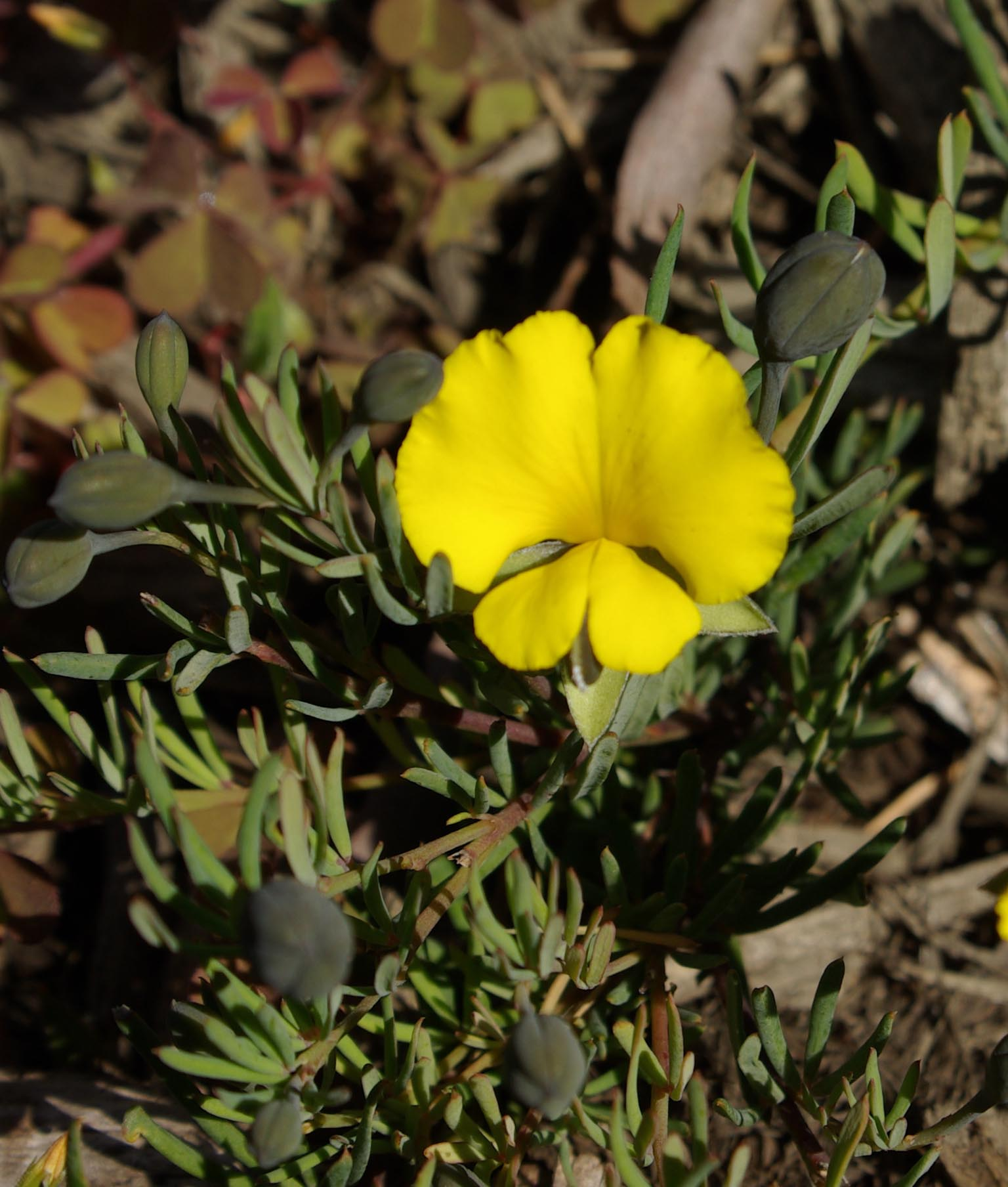
- Gomphobium huegelii in the Royal Tasmanian Botanical Gardens

Scientific classification
- Kingdom: Plantae
- Clade: Tracheophytes
- Clade: Angiosperms
- Clade: Eudicots
- Clade: Rosids
- Order: Fabales
- Family: Fabaceae
- Subfamily: Faboideae
- Genus: Gompholobium
- Species: G. huegelii

Binomial name
- Gompholobium huegelii Benth.

Synonyms
- Gompholobium huegelii Benth. var. huegelii; Gompholobium huegelii var. leptophyllum Benth.; Gompholobium latifolium Labill. nom. illeg.; Gompholobium pedunculare Lodd., G.Lodd. & W.Lodd. nom. illeg.

= Gompholobium huegelii =

Common wedge-pea

Species of legume

Gompholobium huegelii, commonly known as common wedge-pea is a species of flowering plant in the family Fabaceae and is endemic to south-eastern Australia. It is an erect or spreading shrub with trifoliate leaves and cream-coloured to yellow and greenish, pea-like flowers.

== Description ==
Gompholobium huegelii is an erect or spreading, more or less glabrous shrub that typically grows to a height of up to 1 m (3 ft 3 in). The leaves are trifoliate with linear to lance-shaped leaflets with the narrower end towards the base, 5–20 mm (0.20–0.79 in) long and 0.5–2.0 mm (0.020–0.079 in) wide with the edges rolled under and bristly stipules at the base. The flowers are arranged singly or in small groups on the ends of branchlets, each flower 15–20 mm (0.59–0.79 in) long on a pedicel up to 15 mm (0.59 in) long. The sepals are up to 10 mm (0.39 in) long and the flowers are cream-coloured to yellow apart from the yellowish-green keel. Flowering occurs in most months with a peak between September and April, and the fruit is an oval pod up to 15 mm (0.59 in) long.

== Taxonomy and naming ==
Gompholobium huegelii was first formally described in 1837 by George Bentham in Stephan Endlicher's Enumeratio plantarum quas in Novae Hollandiae ora austro-occidentali ad fluvium Cygnorum et in sinu Regis Georgii collegit Carolus Liber Baro de Hügel. The specific epithet (huegelii) honours Charles von Hügel.

== Distribution ==
Common wedge-pea grows in heathland and forest in the far south-east of Queensland through the coast, tablelands and western slopes of New South Wales, the higher rainfall areas of Victoria and to Tasmania where it is widespread and common.
