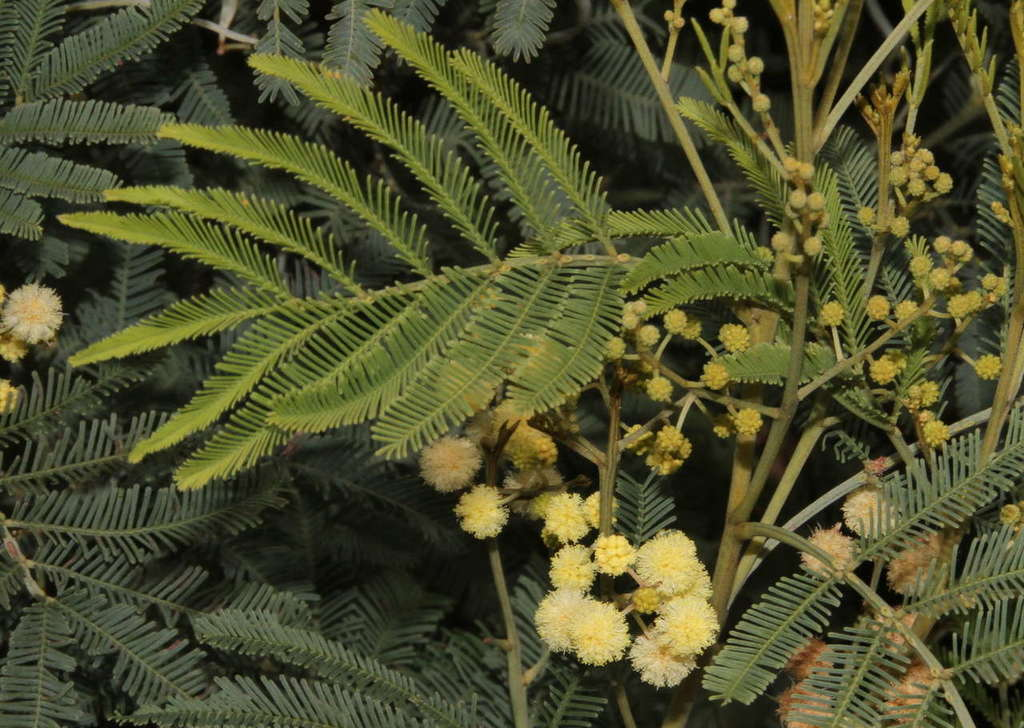
- Subspecies paucijuga near Mitiamo

Scientific classification
- Kingdom: Plantae
- Clade: Tracheophytes
- Clade: Angiosperms
- Clade: Eudicots
- Clade: Rosids
- Order: Fabales
- Family: Fabaceae
- Subfamily: Caesalpinioideae
- Clade: Mimosoid clade
- Genus: Acacia
- Species: A. deanei

Binomial name
- Acacia deanei (R.T.Baker) M.B.Welch, Coombs & McGlynn
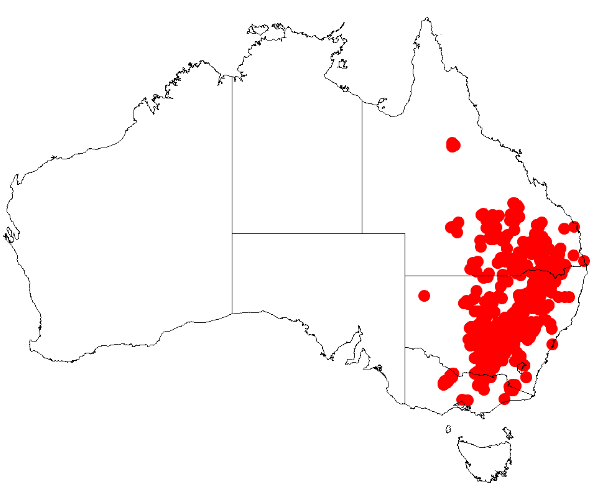
- Occurrence data from AVH

Synonyms
- Acacia decurrens var. deanei R.T.Baker; Racosperma deanei (R.T.Baker) Pedley

= Acacia deanei =

Deane's wattle

Species of legume

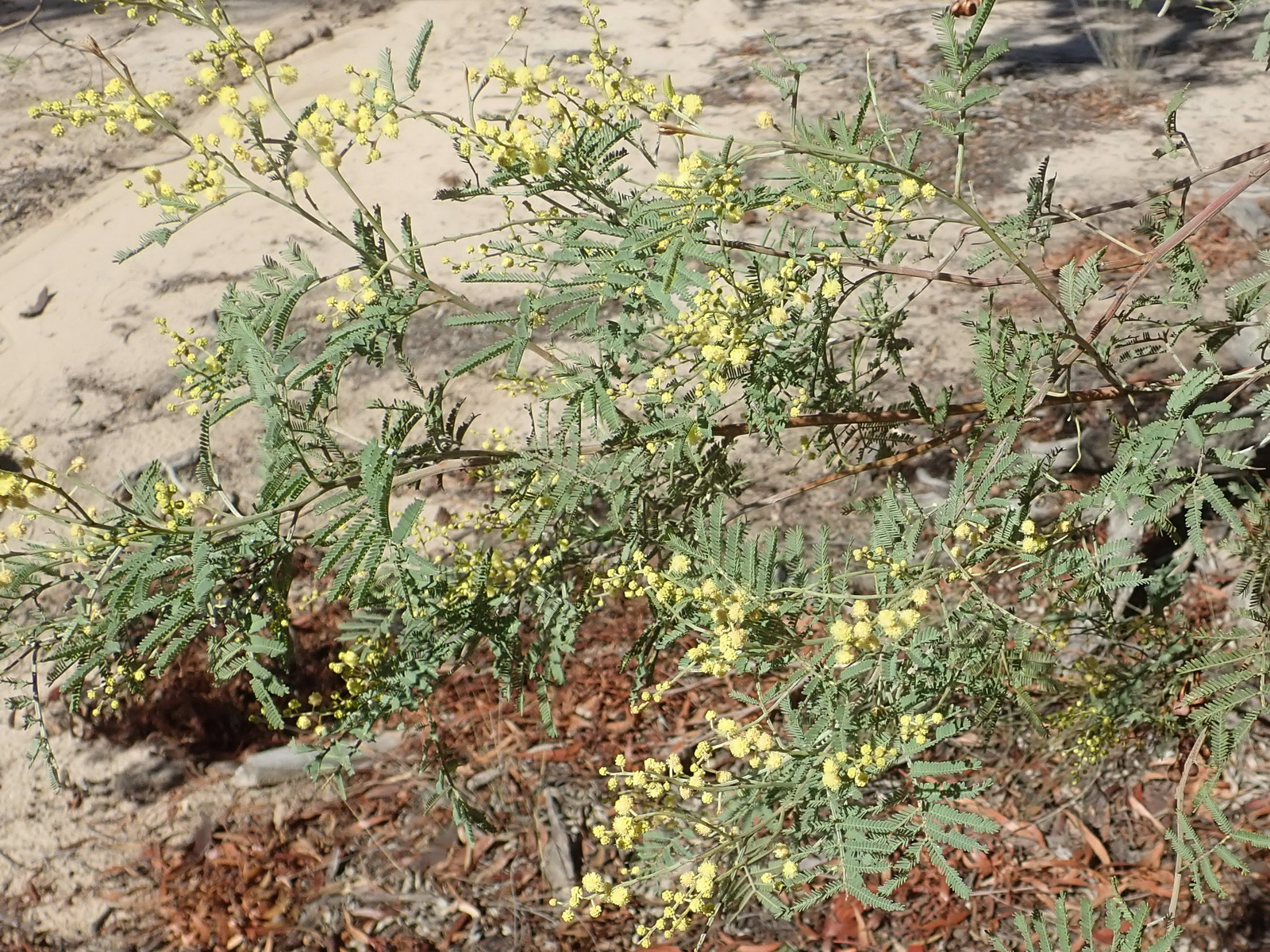
Habit

Acacia deanei, commonly known as green wattle or Deane's wattle, is a species of flowering plant in the family Fabaceae and is endemic to eastern Australia. It is shrub or tree with leathery, bipinnate leaves, heads of cream-coloured, pale yellow or yellow flowers and linear to narrowly oblong, leathery pods.

== Description ==
Acacia deanei is shrub or tree that typically grows to height of 1.5–7 m (4 ft 11 in – 23 ft 0 in), usually with many stems, and has smooth green, grey, brown or brownish purple bark. Its branchlets are slightly flattened and covered with yellow, golden or rust-coloured hairs. The leaves are bipinnate and leathery, on a petiole 4–30 mm (0.16–1.18 in) long, with 3 to 12 pairs of pinnae, each with 11 to 32 pairs of widely spaced, linear to narrowly oblong pinnules 1–12 mm (0.039–0.472 in) long and 0.4–1.3 mm (0.016–0.051 in) wide. The flowers are borne in spherical heads in racemes in leaf axils or on the ends of branches on peduncles 1–5 mm (0.039–0.197 in) long. Each head is 3.0–5.5 mm (0.12–0.22 in) in diameter with 15 to 30 cream-coloured to pale yellow or yellow flowers. Flowering time depends on subspecies and the pods are leathery, black or dark brown, linear to narrowly oblong, 35–180 mm (1.4–7.1 in) long, 5–12 mm (0.20–0.47 in) wide and more or less constricted between the seeds.

Acacia deanei is sometimes confused with Acacia mearnsii or A. parramattensis.

== Taxonomy ==
This species was first formally described in 1896 by Richard Thomas Baker who gave it the name Acacia decurrens var. deanei in the Proceedings of the Linnean Society of New South Wales from specimens collected by Henry Deane near Gilgandra. In 1932, Marcus Baldwin Welch, Frank Andrew Coombs and William Henry McGlynn raised the variety to species status as Acacia deanei in the Journal and Proceedings of the Royal Society of New South Wales.

The specific epithet was not specified by R.T. Baker, but presumably honours Henry Deane, who collected the type specimen.

In 1966, Mary Tindale described two subspecies of A. deanei in Contributions from the New South Wales National Herbarium, and the names are accepted by the Australian Plant Census:

- Acacia deanei (R.T.Baker) M.B.Welch, Coombs & McGlynn subsp. deanei commonly known as green wattle or Deane's wattle, has a petiole 5–15 mm (0.20–0.59 in) long, 3 to 12 pairs of pinnae mostly 10–35 mm (0.39–1.38 in) long and up to 34 pairs of pinnules mostly oblong to narrowly oblong, 1.5–5 mm (0.059–0.197 in) long, 0.5–1.3 mm (0.020–0.051 in) wide and sparsely to moderately hairy on the lower surface. Flowering occurs in most months with a peak from March to August.
- Acacia deanei subsp. paucijuga (F.Muell. ex N.A.Wakef.) Tindale, (previously known as Acacia paucijuga) has a petiole 5–30 mm (0.20–1.18 in) long, 1 to 8 pairs of pinnae mostly 15–65 mm (0.59–2.56 in) long and up to 45 pairs of pinnules mostly narrowly oblong to more or less linear, 4–12 mm (0.16–0.47 in) long, 0.4–1.0 mm (0.016–0.039 in) wide and sparsely hairy to glabrous on the lower surface. Flowering occurs in most months.

== Distribution and habitat ==
Acacia deanei plant is widespread in inland, southern Queensland, central New South Wales and central Victoria. It is found in a variety of sclerophyll communities in a range of different soil types.

- Subspecies deanei occurs in the drier, inland parts of southern Queensland as far north as Gregory Springs Station (near Porcupine), is widespread in New South Wales, as far south as Yanco and as far west as Louth, but is only known from the Chiltern area in Victoria.
- Subspecies paucijuga occurs on the plains, slopes and tablelands of New South Wales, as far north as Lightning Ridge and as far west as Rankins Springs, and is common in the Snowy River valley and south to Wedderburn.

== Conservation status ==
Subspecies deanei is listed as "endangered" and subsp. paucijuga as "vulnerable" under the Victorian Government Flora and Fauna Guarantee Act 1988.

== See also ==
- List of Acacia species
