= Hume and Hovell Track =

Australian walking track

The Hume and Hovell Walking Track stretches over 440 kilometres (270 mi) between Yass and Albury, in New South Wales, Australia. The track allows walkers to rediscover the route of explorers Hamilton Hume and William Hovell on their expedition to Port Phillip in 1824.

The Track starts at Cooma Cottage on the outskirts of Yass and finishes at the Hovell Tree on the banks of the Murray River in Albury. Along its route the track passes through the towns of Yass, Wee Jasper and Albury and nearby the towns of Tumut, Talbingo and Tumbarumba. It has 3 major developed trackheads allowing vehicle based camping, 17 primitive walk-in campsites, picnic facilities, numerous boardwalks and three major bridges over rivers.

The track is managed by the NSW Department Of Lands.
