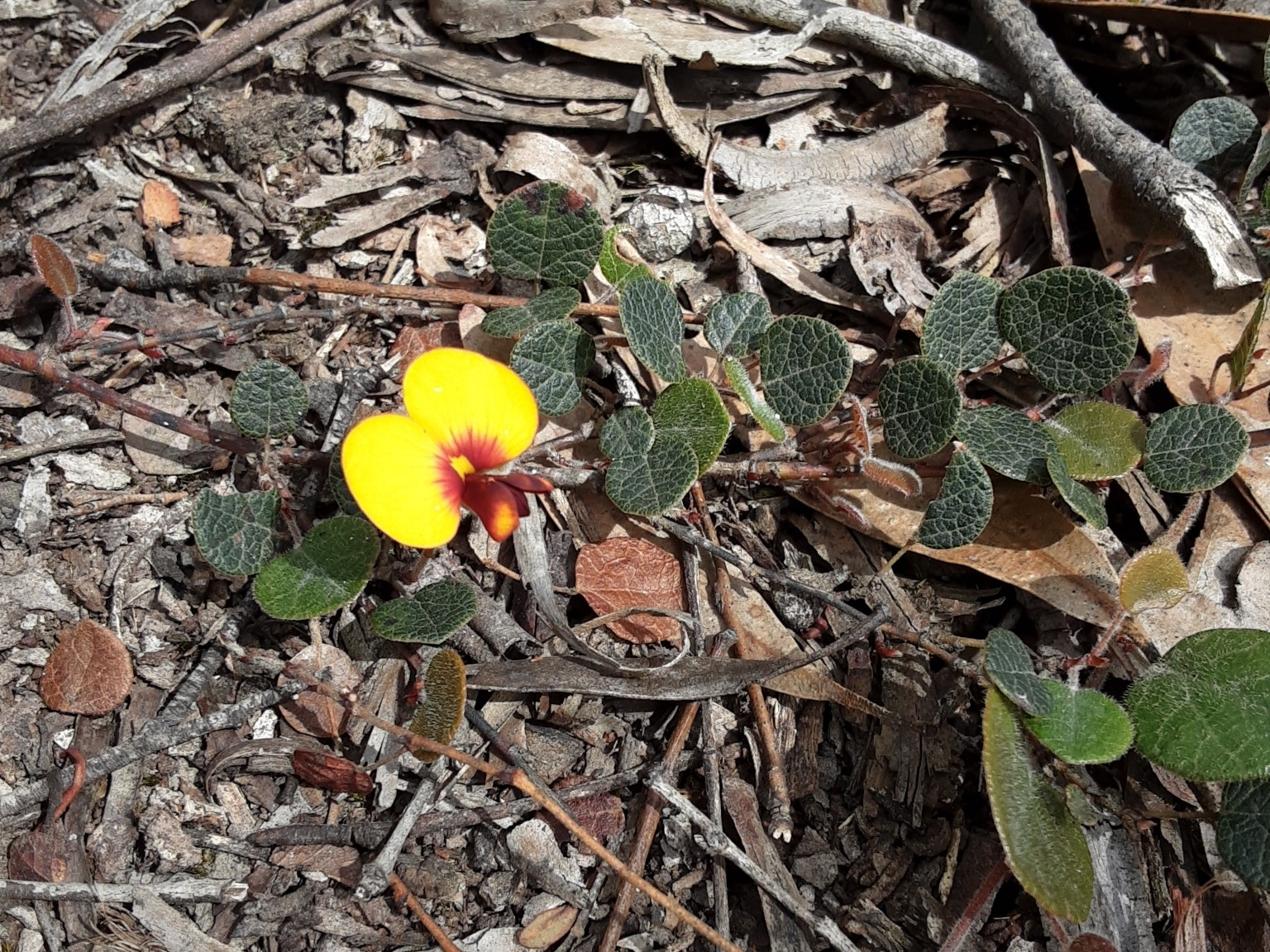

Scientific classification
- Kingdom: Plantae
- Clade: Tracheophytes
- Clade: Angiosperms
- Clade: Eudicots
- Clade: Rosids
- Order: Fabales
- Family: Fabaceae
- Subfamily: Faboideae
- Genus: Platylobium
- Species: P. rotundum

Binomial name
- Platylobium rotundum I.Thomps.

= Platylobium rotundum =

Species of legume

Platylobium rotundum is a shrub species that is endemic to Victoria, Australia. It is a member of the family Fabaceae and was formally described in 2011. The type specimen was collected from Drummond North.
