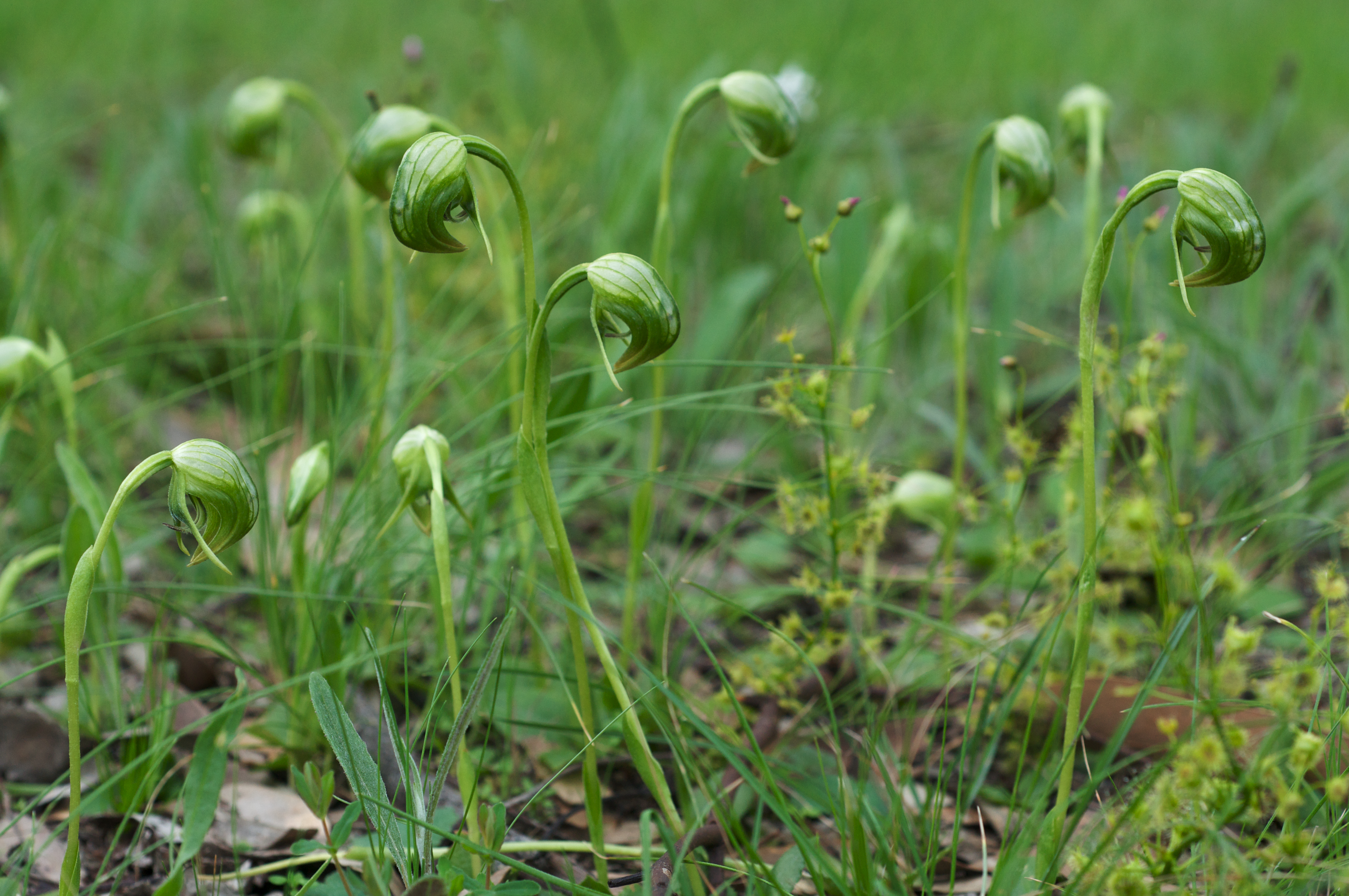

Scientific classification
- Kingdom: Plantae
- Clade: Tracheophytes
- Clade: Angiosperms
- Clade: Monocots
- Order: Asparagales
- Family: Orchidaceae
- Subfamily: Orchidoideae
- Tribe: Cranichideae
- Genus: Pterostylis
- Species: P. nutans

Binomial name
- Pterostylis nutans R.Br.

= Pterostylis nutans =

Nodding greenhood

Species of orchid

Pterostylis nutans, commonly known as the nodding greenhood or the parrot's beak orchid, is a species of orchid endemic to eastern Australia. Nodding greenhoods have flowers which "nod" or lean forwards strongly, have a deeply notched sinus and a curved, hairy labellum.

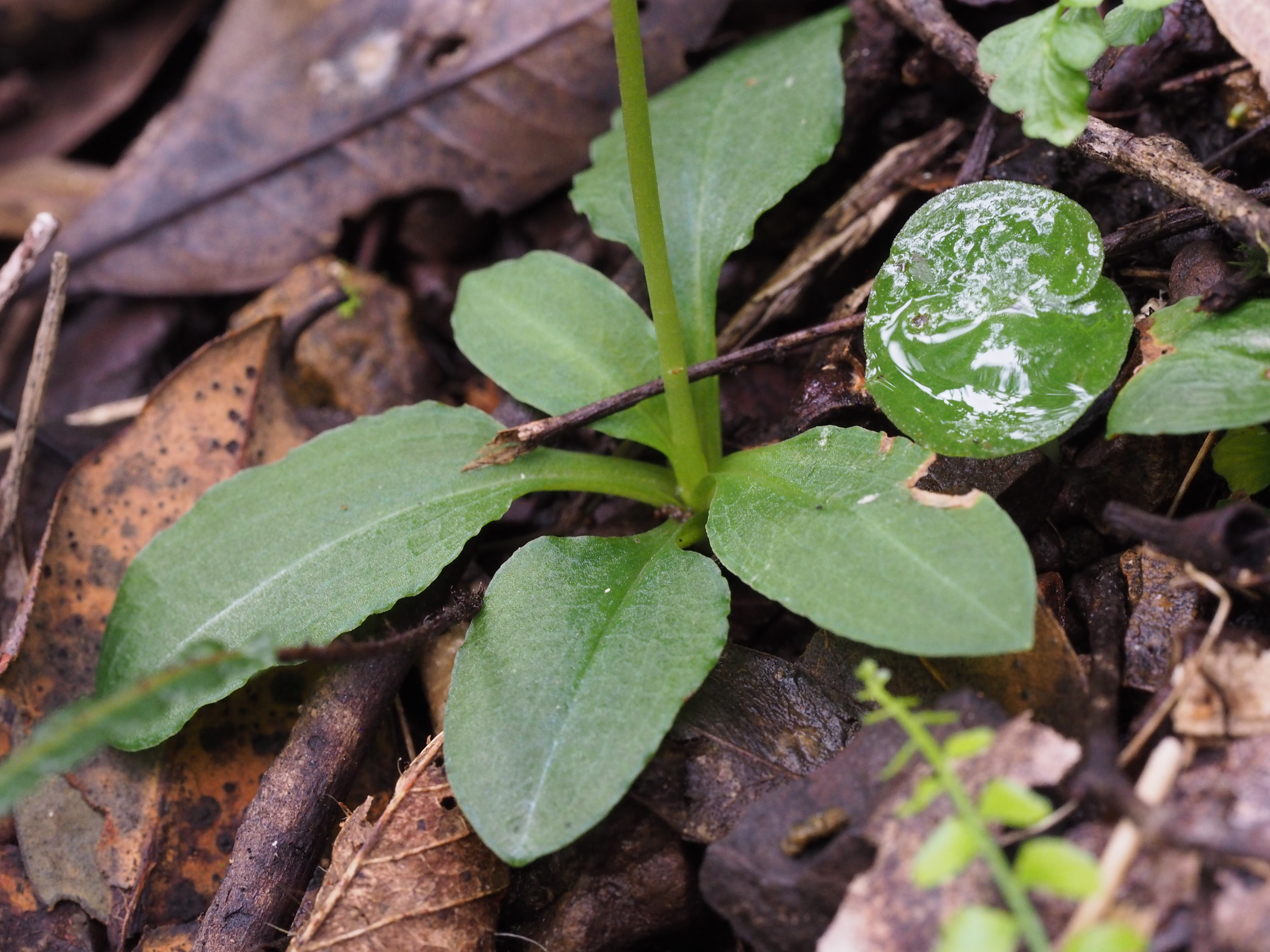
Pterostylis nutans rosette

== Description ==
Pterostylis nutans has a rosette of between three and six egg-shaped to elliptic leaves, each leaf 15–30 mm (0.6–1 in) long and 10–20 mm (0.4–0.8 in) wide. The leaves are dark green, have a wavy edge and a distinct petiole. A single translucent white flower with green stripes and brown colouration is borne on a flowering spike 80–300 mm (3–10 in) high, the flower strongly "nodding" or leaning forwards. The flowers are 18–25 mm (0.7–1 in) long, 10–14 mm (0.4–0.6 in) wide. There is a wide gap at each side of the flower between the petals and the lateral sepals. The lateral sepals curve forwards, have a tapering tip, 10–18 mm (0.4–0.7 in) long and there is a deeply notched sinus between them. The labellum protrudes from the flower and is 14–18 mm (0.6–0.7 in) long, 4 mm (0.2 in) wide, curved, blunt, green and brown and covered with short, bristly hairs. Flowering occurs from March to December.

== Taxonomy and naming ==
Pterostylis nutans was first described in 1810 by Robert Brown and the description was published in Prodromus Florae Novae Hollandiae et Insulae Van Diemen. The specific epithet (nutans) is a Latin word meaning "nodding" or "drooping".

== Distribution and habitat ==
Nodding greenhoods often occur in large colonies in moist, protected forest environments and is native to the Australian states of South Australia, Tasmania, Victoria, New South Wales and Queensland as well as the Australian Capital Territory. In Queensland it grows as far north as the Atherton Tableland, in the eastern half of New South Wales, the southern half of Victoria, the south-eastern corner of South Australia and in Tasmania, including King and Flinders Islands. It has also been found in New Zealand but is regarded as a vagrant there because the insect pollinator is not present in that country. There is a single population remaining near the Waihaha River, although there have been records from Kaitaia and Castor Bay.

== Ecology ==
This greenhood is pollinated by a particular species of fungus gnat, attracted by a kairomone produced by the flower's labellum. The labellum tips the insect into the flower, and in attempting to escape, it comes into contact with the sexual organs of the flower and pollination occurs.

== Use in horticulture ==
Pterostylis nutans is easily grown in pots containing a free-draining, sandy mix. The plants require regular watering during their growing period, to be kept dry during dormancy and to be repotted annually.

== Cultural significance ==
Pterostylis nutans is the emblem of the Castlemaine Field Naturalist Club.
