= Oban River =

Coordinates: 30°01′S 151°57′E

Oban River Ann River

Location
- Country: Australia
- State: New South Wales
- IBRA: Ben Lomond, New England Tablelands
- District: New England, Northern Tablelands
- Municipality: Armidale

Physical characteristics
- Source: Mount Duncan, Great Dividing Range
  - location: Little Llangothlin Lake, north of Guyra
  - elevation: 1,360 m (4,460 ft)
- Mouth: confluence with the Sara River
  - location: below Bare Hill, within Guy Fawkes River National Park
  - elevation: 818 m (2,684 ft)
- Length: 47 km (29 mi)

Basin features
- River system: Clarence River catchment
- National parks: Guy Fawkes River NP, Chaelundi NP

Oban River, a watercourse that is part of the Clarence River catchment, is located in the New England and Northern Tablelands districts of New South Wales, Australia.

== Course and features ==
Oban River rises below Mount Duncan, Great Dividing Range on the slopes of the Great Dividing Range, within Little Llangothlin Lake, north of Guyra, and flows generally north-east towards its confluence with the Sara River, within Guy Fawkes River National Park and Chaelundi National Park. The river descends 542 metres (1,778 ft) over its 47 kilometres (29 mi) course.

== See also ==
- Rivers of New South Wales
