= Newton Boyd =

- Town
- Interactive map of Newton Boyd
- Coordinates: 29°45′14.0″S 152°15′11.3″E
- Country: Australia
- State: New South Wales
- LGAs: Clarence Valley; Glen Innes Severn
- Location: 94 km (58 mi) from Grafton; 86 km (53 mi) from Glen Innes

Government
  - State electorates: Clarence; Glen Innes
  - Federal divisions: Page; New England
- Elevation: 353 m (1,158 ft)

Population
  - Total: 21 (2021 census)
- Postcode: 2370
- County: Gresham
- Parish: Newton Boyd, Henry

Newton Boyd is a rural locality in the Northern Rivers region of New South Wales, Australia. There once was a village of the same name. At the 2021 census, the population was 21.

== Location ==
The area now known as Newton Boyd lies within the traditional lands of Baanbay people, a group of Gumbainggir.

The rural locality of Newton Boyd consists of the valleys of the Henry River and its tributary Bruisers Creek, much of the upper part valley of the Mann River, a part of the valley of the Boyd River, and mountainous land adjoining those valleys.

The Henry River and, below its confluence with the that river, the Mann River, form the boundary between the Clarence Valley and Glenn Innes Severn local government areas, and consequently, the Newton Boyd locality is divided between those two local government areas.

== History ==
The area was said to be called Begann in the local Aboriginal language.

The first use of the name Newton Boyd was as the name of a squatter run licensed under Archibald Boyd, cousin of Benjamin Boyd, who claimed the run as his own as well as others which were owned nominally by his cousins or business partner Joseph Phelps Robinson. The town of Newton Stewart in Scotland was near where Benjamin Boyd was raised. The name was in use by 1845, and Boyd occupied the land until 1849.

Despite being occupied by colonial settlers following the establishment of the run, in the 1870s there were still around 200 local Aboriginal people living in the area, and some acts of violence between the two communities. An Aboriginal man, Billy Buchan, who had worked as a stockman at Newton Boyd, and died in 1915, recalled two massacres of Aborigines, by vengeful colonial settlers, in northern New South Wales.

In November 1869, the bushranger known as Captain Thunderbolt, Frederick Wordsworth Ward (c. 1835 – 1870), was alone, in the area of the headwaters of the Clarence River catchment. He held up Broadmeadows Station followed by a road camp, stealing a horse, a revolver and ammunition from the road superintendent. He was pursued by police, but managed to evade capture.

== Village ==
The village of Newton Boyd, officially a town, was located on both sides of a road crossing of the Henry River upstream of its confluence with the Mann River. A site of 1,440 acres was reserved for a village in 1866, 70 chains east of the woolshed of the Newton Boyd run.

In the time before the railway was built to Glen Innes, the old road from Grafton, via Dalmorton and Newton Boyd, completed around 1869, was the main route for transport to and from the Northern Tablelands. A hotel was nearing completion at the crossing of the Henry River by September 1871. In August 1871, a site was reserved for the town of Newton Boyd. By late 1874, the hotel and a blacksmith's shop were the only buildings in the town, with the same person serving as both innkeeper and blacksmith. In 1875, a contract was awarded for a bridge across the Henry River at Newton Boyd.

Local Aboriginal people supplied the hotel with fish that they caught in the river, in exchange for alcohol. A local free selector supplied the hotel with other produce.

In October 1918, the settlement hosted a visit by General Pau and others of a visiting French mission.

During the early 1920s, some larger holdings in the area were sub-divided and converted to dairy farming, and a cheese factory opened at Newton Boyd. A sawmill opened around the same time, and timber getting in the nearby forests was also an occupation for residents of Newton Boyd. There was also some gold mining in the area, and, in 1918, there was a molybdenite mine about two miles from the village. Despite these sources of employment, Newton Boyd never grew into a large settlement.

The hotel, by then known as the Rosemount Hotel, was badly damaged by fire in January 1941, and its licence was surrendered in late 1941. By then, the population, within a five mile radius was said to be less than 25. Newton Boyd had a school from January 1896 to December 1974. The village had a post office. There was also a war memorial hall, opened, in September 1924, by Governor de Chair, who also unveiled the village's war memorial.

In 1924 and 1959, the area of the town was reduced by the closure of some streets. In 1968, Newton Boyd was mentioned only as a hamlet.

== Present day ==
There is little left of the village now, other than its war memorial. The roll of honour from the Newton Boyd hall is now at a museum in Glen Innes. The portion of the main road through the village site is still known as Clarence Street, and it provides the link between Old Grafton Road (from the Glenn Innes end) and Old Glen Innes Road (from the Grafton end).

The land in the valley bottoms within the locality is mostly cleared for agriculture, and mainly used for grazing. Much of the higher, forested areas are either part of Nymboyda National Park or Gibraltar Range National Park.
