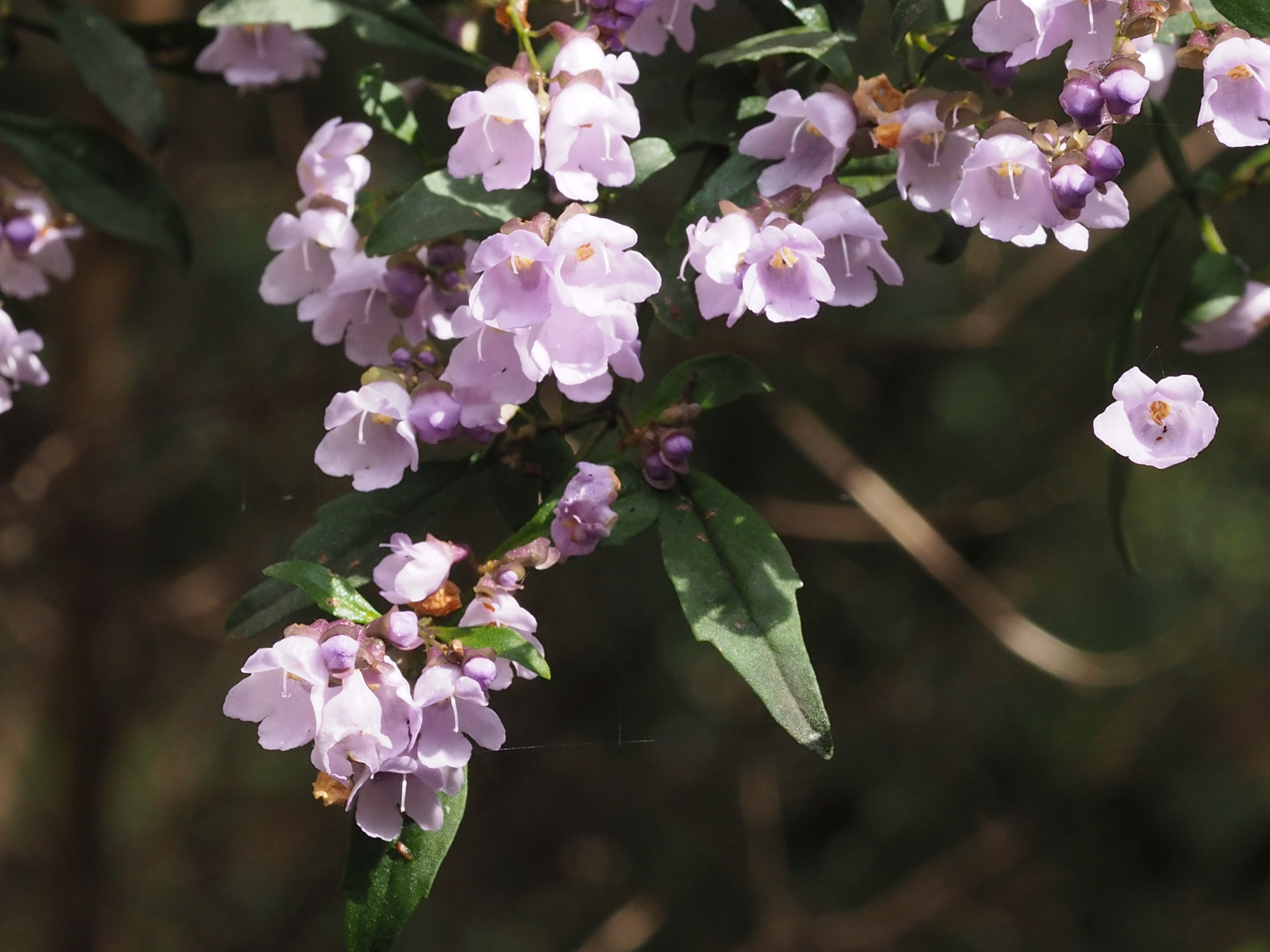
- In Sherwood Nature Reserve

Scientific classification
- Kingdom: Plantae
- Clade: Embryophytes
- Clade: Tracheophytes
- Clade: Angiosperms
- Clade: Eudicots
- Clade: Asterids
- Order: Lamiales
- Family: Lamiaceae
- Genus: Prostanthera
- Species: P. lanceolata

Binomial name
- Prostanthera lanceolata Domin
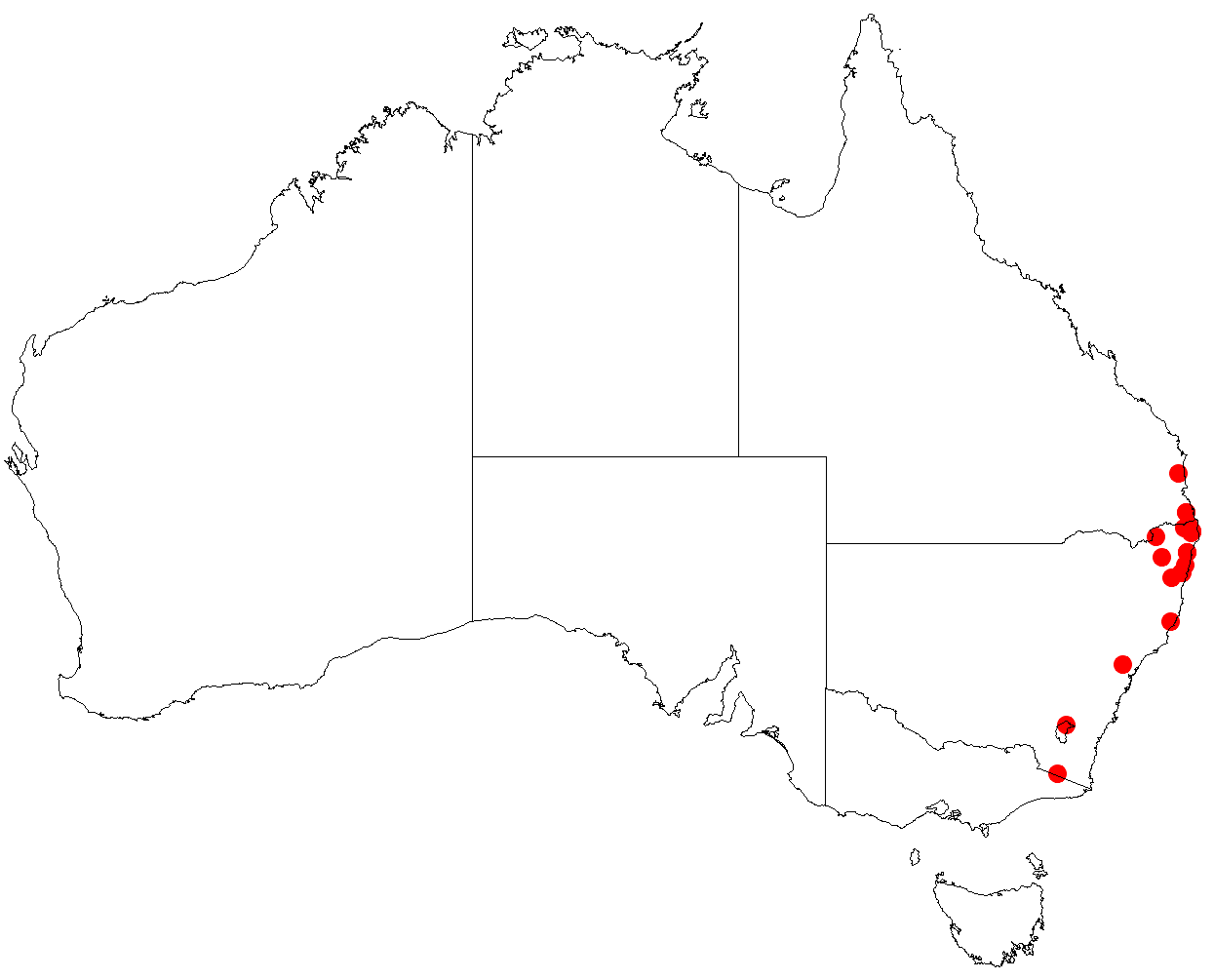

= Prostanthera lanceolata =

Species of flowering plant

Prostanthera lanceolata is a species of flowering plant in the family Lamiaceae and is endemic to near-coastal areas of eastern Australia. It is an erect, aromatic shrub that has stems that are square in cross-section, glandular, egg-shaped leaves and mauve or deep bluish-purple flowers.

== Description ==
Prostanthera lanceolata is an erect, aromatic shrub that typically grows to a height of 3–4 m (9.8–13.1 ft) and has branches that are square in cross-section. The leaves are mid to dark green, paler below, narrow egg-shaped to egg-shaped, 15–25 mm (0.59–0.98 in) long and 9–12 mm (0.35–0.47 in) wide on a petiole 2–5 mm (0.079–0.197 in) long. The flowers are arranged in bunches near the ends of branchlets with bracteoles about 1 mm (0.039 in) long at the base, but that fall off as the flower develops. The sepals are about 4 mm (0.16 in) long, forming a tube about 2 mm (0.079 in) long with two lobes, the upper lobe 1.5–2 mm (0.059–0.079 in) long. The petals are mauve to deep bluish-purple and 8–12 mm (0.31–0.47 in) long. Flowering occurs in spring. This species is included in Prostanthera ovalifolia in Queensland.

== Taxonomy ==
Prostanthera lanceolata was first formally described in 1928 by Karel Domin in Bibliotheca Botanica from material he collected near the "Tambourine Mountains" in 1910.

== Distribution and habitat ==
This mintbush grows in forest in near-coastal areas of New South Wales and Queensland.
