= Chandlers Creek =

Location
- Country: Australia
- State: New South Wales
- Region: New England Tablelands (IBRA), Northern Tablelands
- Local government area: Clarence Valley

Physical characteristics
- Source: Thunderbolts Range, Great Dividing Range
  - location: near Mount Hyland, Marengo State Forest
  - elevation: 1,280 m (4,200 ft)
- Mouth: confluence with the Boyd River
  - location: at Louis Point, west of Coutts Crossing
  - coordinates: 30°02′S 152°33′E
  - elevation: 186 m (610 ft)
- Length: 64 km (40 mi)

Basin features
- River system: Clarence River catchment
- Tributaries
  - left: Browns Camp Creek
  - right: Opossum Creek (NSW)
- National parks: Guy Fawkes River NP, Chaelundi NP

The Chandlers Creek, a perennial stream that is part of the Clarence River catchment, is located in the Northern Tablelands region of New South Wales, Australia.

== Course and features ==
Chandlers Creek rises in the Marengo State Forest, about 7 kilometres (4.3 mi) northwest of Mount Hyland, below Thunderbolts Range, within the Great Dividing Range, east southeast of Glen Innes. The river flows generally to the northeast then north northwest through parts of the Guy Fawkes River and Chaelundi national parks, joined by two minor tributaries before reaching its confluence with the Boyd River at Louis Point, a locality on the Old Glen Innes Grafton Road west of Coutts Crossing. The river descends 1,100 metres (3,600 ft) over its 64 kilometres (40 mi) course.

== See also ==
- Rivers of New South Wales
- List of rivers of New South Wales (A-K)
- List of rivers of Australia
