= Aberfoyle River =

Watercourse in Australia

Aberfoyle River Balblair Creek
- Location of the mouth Aberfoyle River (Australia)

Location
- Country: Australia
- State: New South Wales
- IBRA: New England Tablelands
- Regions: New England; Northern Tablelands
- Municipality: Guyra

Physical characteristics
- Source: Great Dividing Range
  - location: Llangothlin, north of Guyra
  - elevation: 1,340 m (4,400 ft)
- Mouth: confluence with the Guy Fawkes River
  - location: below Chaelundi Mountain, within Guy Fawkes River National Park
  - coordinates: 30°06′S 152°17′E
  - elevation: 374 m (1,227 ft)
- Length: 115 km (71 mi)

Basin features
- River system: Clarence River catchment
- Tributaries
  - left: Kangaroo Hills Creek, Round Waterhole Creek
  - right: Nowlands Backwater
- National park: Guy Fawkes River National Park

Aberfoyle River, a watercourse that is part of the Clarence River catchment, is located in the New England and Northern Tablelands districts of New South Wales, Australia.

== Course and features ==
Aberfoyle River rises on the slopes of the Great Dividing Range, at Llangothlin, north of Guyra, and flows generally south southeast, east southeast, northeast, and east northeast, joined by three minor tributaries towards its confluence with the Guy Fawkes River, below Chaelundi Mountain, within Guy Fawkes River National Park. The river descends 971 metres (3,186 ft) over its 115 kilometres (71 mi) course.

The Devils Chimney in the Aberfoyle River Gorge was declared an Aboriginal Place on 8 August 1980. An Aboriginal Place is an area of special significance to Aboriginal culture and declaration provides recognition of the significance of the area and its heritage values which relate to traditions, observances, customs, beliefs or history of Aboriginal people.

== See also ==
- Rivers of New South Wales
