= River Yarrow =

The River Yarrow may refer to:

- River Yarrow (Lancashire), a river in the north west of England
- Yarrow River, a river of the state of New South Wales in Australia
- Yarrow Water, a river in the Borders in the south east of Scotland
