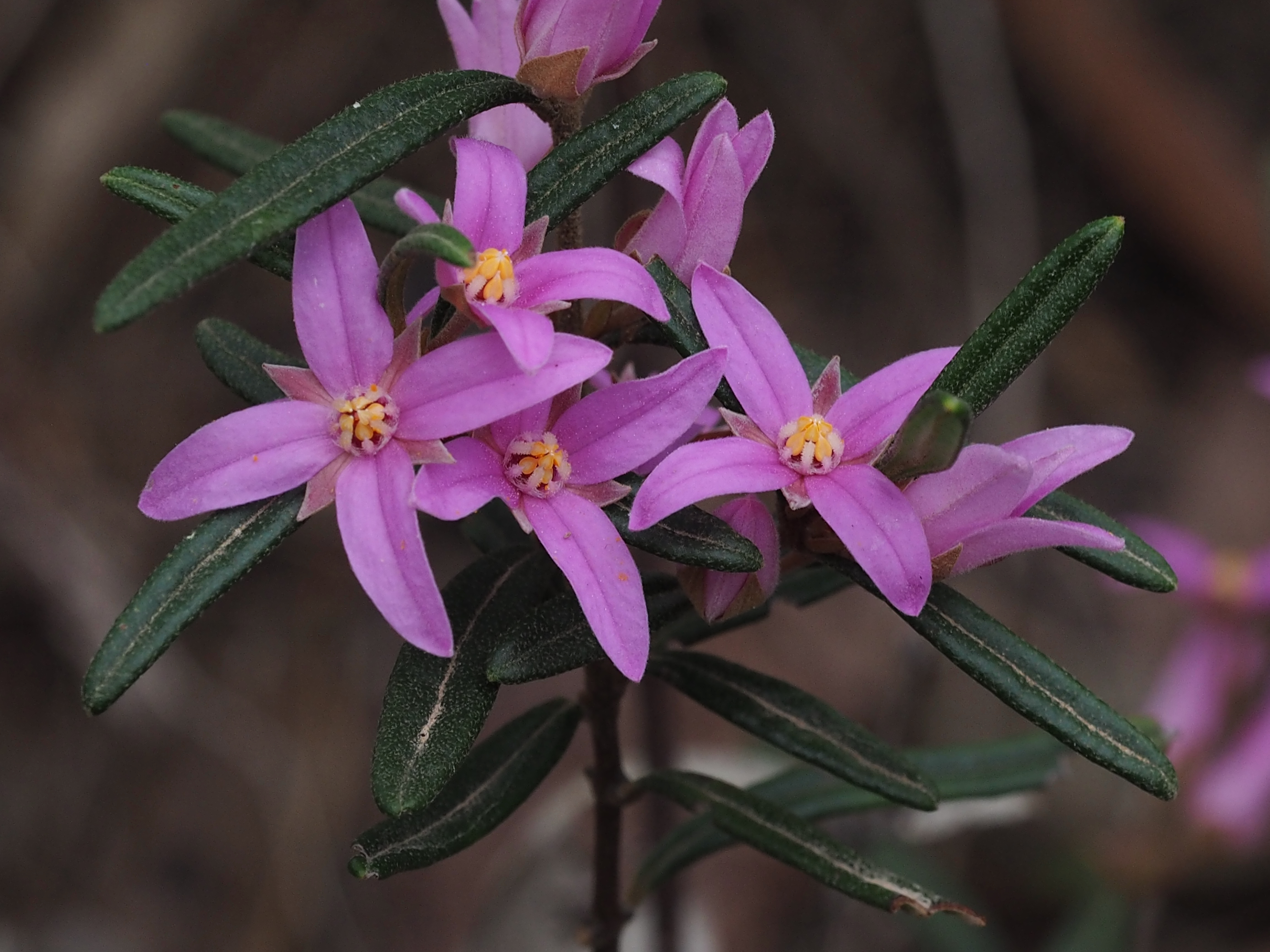
- Boronia hapalophylla in the Sherwood Nature Reserve near Glenreagh

Conservation status
- Vulnerable (EPBC Act)

Scientific classification
- Kingdom: Plantae
- Clade: Tracheophytes
- Clade: Angiosperms
- Clade: Eudicots
- Clade: Rosids
- Order: Sapindales
- Family: Rutaceae
- Genus: Boronia
- Species: B. hapalophylla

Binomial name
- Boronia hapalophylla Duretto, F.J.Edwards & P.G.Edwards
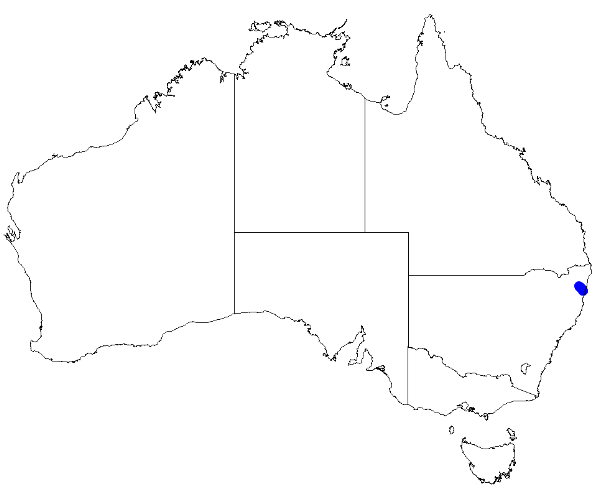
- Occurrence data from Australasian Virtual Herbarium

= Boronia hapalophylla =

Shannon Creek boronia

Species of flowering plant

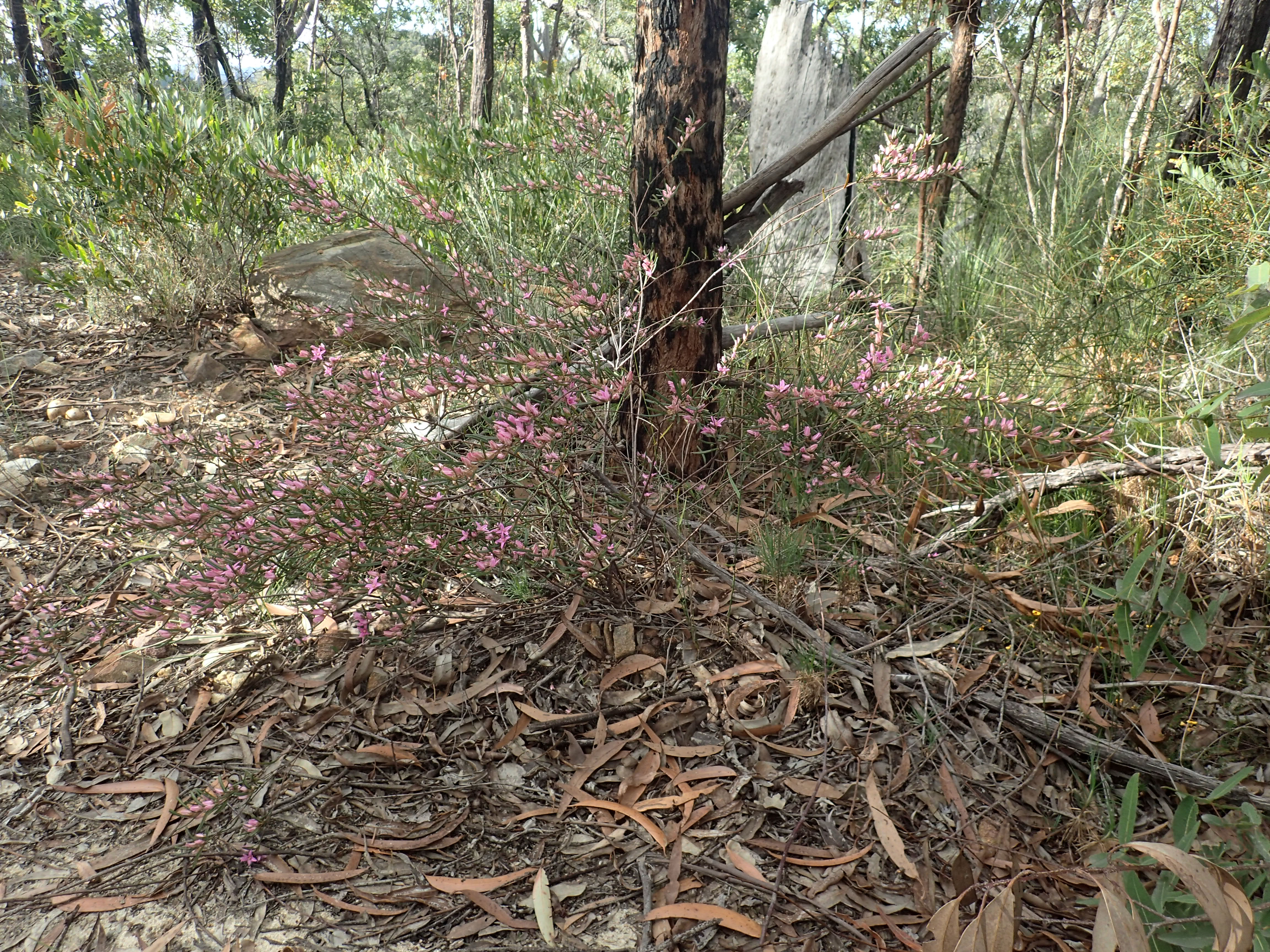
Habit

Boronia hapalophylla is a plant in the citrus family Rutaceae and is endemic to New South Wales. It is an erect or straggling shrub with simple leaves, hairy branches and relatively large pink, four-petalled flowers.

== Description ==
Boronia hapalophylla is an erect or straggling shrub that grows to about 3 m (10 ft) high and has branches with minute, star-like hairs. The leaves are simple, narrow elliptic to lance-shaped, mostly 18–50 mm (0.7–2 in) long, 3.5–12 mm (0.1–0.5 in) wide with a hairy, paler underside and the edges rolled down. The leaves are sessile or sometimes have a petiole up to 1.5 mm (0.06 in) long. The flowers are pink, sometimes white and are arranged singly or in groups of up to seven in leaf axils, the groups on a peduncle up to 5 mm (0.2 in) long (if present), the individual flowers on a pedicel 2–6.5 mm (0.08–0.3 in) long. The four sepals are broadly egg-shaped to triangular, mostly 5–10 mm (0.2–0.4 in) long, 3–4.5 mm (0.1–0.2 in) wide and hairy on the back. The four petals are 6–15 mm (0.2–0.6 in) long and densely hairy on the back. Flowering occurs mainly in August and September.

== Taxonomy and naming ==
Boronia hapalophylla was first formally described in 2004 by Marco Duretto, John Edwards and Patricia Edwards who published the description in the journal Telopea. The specific epithet (hapalophylla) means "soft to touch", referring to the soft, hairy surface of the leaves.

== Distribution and habitat ==
This boronia usually grows in open forest, sometimes in thick gully vegetation, and is restricted to 8 locations in the Grafton-Glenreagh area, and is relatively common in Sherwood Nature Reserve and Yuraygir State Conservation Area.

== Conservation ==
Boronia hapalophylla is listed as "endangered" under the New South Wales Government Biodiversity Conservation Act 2016. The main threats to the species include habitat disturbance, weed invasion and trampling by domestic stock and feral herbivores.
