= High Conservation Value Old Growth forest =

Heritage-listed forest in New South Wales, Australia

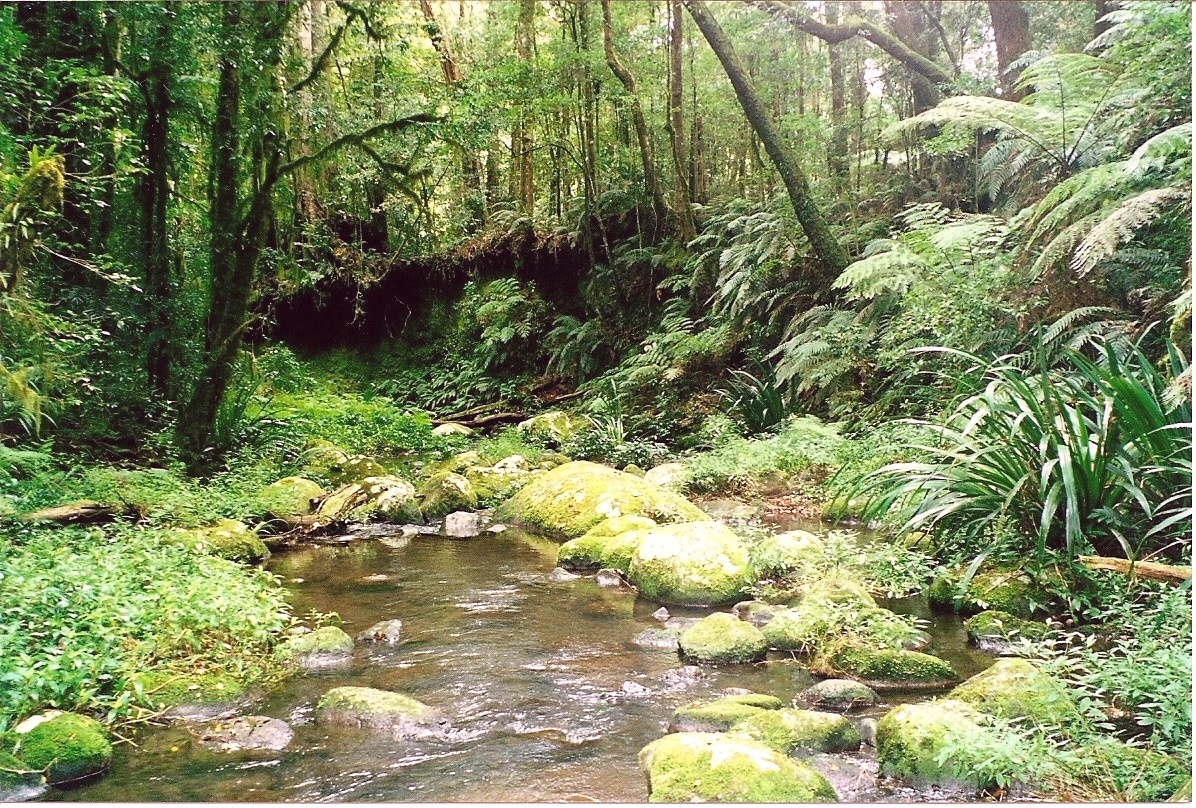
- Brindle Creek in the Border Ranges National Park, part of the conservation area
- Interactive map of High Conservation Value Old Growth forest
- Location: 12 local government areas in the Northern Rivers, Mid North Coast, and New England regions of New South Wales, Australia

Site notes
- Owner: NSW Department of Primary Industries; NSW Office of Environment and Heritage

New South Wales Heritage Register
- Official name: High Conservation Value Old Growth forest; Old Growth Forest; HCVOG Forest; Upper North East NSW
- Type: State heritage (landscape)
- Designated: 22 December 2000
- Reference no.: 1487
- Type: Fauna habitat
- Category: Landscape – Natural
- Various locations of the High Conservation Value Old Growth forests in New South Wales (incomplete: missing most nature reserves)

The High Conservation Value Old Growth forest is a heritage-listed forest located across twelve local government areas in the Northern Rivers, Mid North Coast, and New England regions of New South Wales, Australia. The conservation area is also known as Old Growth Forest; HCVOG Forest; and Upper North East NSW. Broadly speaking, the conservation area forms part of the much larger Gondwana Rainforests, a UNESCO World Heritage Site totalling more than 366,000 hectares (900,000 acres). The conservation area is owned by the NSW Department of Primary Industries and the NSW Office of Environment and Heritage, both agencies of the Government of New South Wales. The conservation area was added to the New South Wales State Heritage Register on 22 December 2000.

== Description ==
The heritage area comprises all those parts, pieces or parcels of land containing HCVOG forest within national parks and nature reserves and state forests (excluding easements and leases) in the Upper North East Region as described below:

1. depicted in the Geographic Information System theme in ESRI grid format called "hcovog1_prtctd" in the sub-directory called "Protected_HCVOG" on the CD-ROM, lodged with Department of Urban Affairs and Planning and having the volume label "991221_1516 (21 December 1999)"; and
2. further described in the corresponding metadata on the CD-ROM.

but excluding those pieces and parcels of land subject to the easements and leases described below:

1. depicted in the Geographic Information System theme in ESRI ArcInfo coverage format called "easement and leases" in the sub-directory called "Heritage Office OG/Tenure" on CD-ROM lodged with the Heritage Office and having the volume label "001117 1805" (17 November 2000) and provided by State Forests of New South Wales; and
2. further described in the corresponding metadata on the CD ROM.

The Upper North East Region is the area as described in section 1.4 of the Forest Agreement for the Upper North East Region, New South Wales Government, 5 March 1999. The heritage-listed conservation area is fully contained within the Armidale Region, Ballina, Byron, Clarence Valley, Coffs Harbour, Glen Innes Severn, Kyogle, Lismore, Mid-Coast, Richmond Valley, Tenterfield, and Tweed local government areas.

National parks

The following twenty-four national parks form part of the heritage-listed conservation forest area: Bald Rock National Park, Barool National Park, Basket Swamp National Park, Boonoo Boonoo National Park, Border Ranges National Park, Bundjalung National Park, Butterleaf National Park, Capoompeta National Park, Chaelundi National Park, Guy Fawkes River National Park, Gibraltar Range National Park, Indwarra National Park, Maryland National Park, Mebbin National Park, Mount Jerusalem National Park, Mount Nothofagus National Park, Nightcap National Park, Nymboi-Binderay National Park, Nymboida National Park, Richmond Range National Park, Warra National Park, Washpool National Park, Wollumbin National Park, and Yuraygir National Park.

Nature reserves

The following nineteen nature reserves form part of the heritage-listed conservation forest area: Burnt Down Scrub Nature Reserve, Chambigne Nature Reserve, Cudgen Nature Reserve, Limpinwood Nature Reserve, Moore Park Nature Reserve, Mount Hyland Nature Reserve, Mucklewee Mountain Nature Reserve, Tabbiemoble Swamp Nature Reserve, Toonumber Nature Reserve, Woodford Island Nature Reserve, Captains Creek Nature Reserve, Couchy Creek Nature Reserve, Demon Nature Reserve, Mann River Nature Reserve, Morro Creek Nature Reserve, Mount-Neville Nature Reserve, Sherwood Nature Reserve, Tallawudjah Nature Reserve, and Uralba Nature Reserve.

== Heritage listing ==
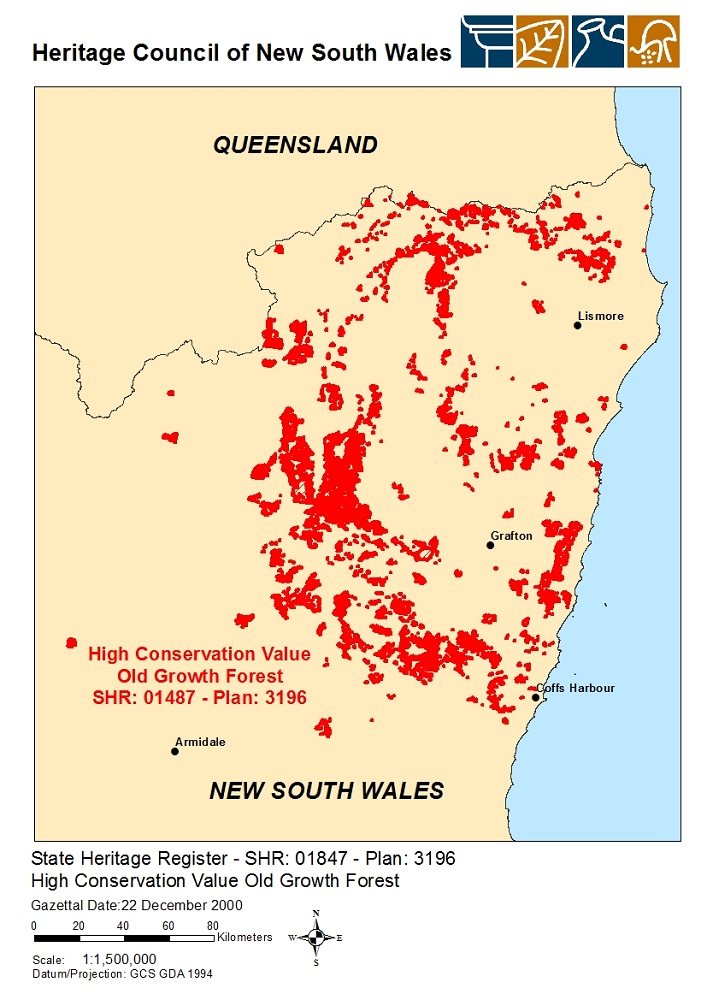
Heritage boundaries

As at 22 September 2017, High Conservation Value Old Growth forest is ecologically mature eucalypt forest showing few signs of human disturbance. The upper canopy trees are no longer growing in height or spreading their crowns and show signs of old age. High Conservation Value Old Growth forest represents the best examples remaining of such forests.

High Conservation Value Old Growth forest was listed on the New South Wales State Heritage Register on 22 December 2000 having satisfied the following criteria.

The place is important in demonstrating the course, or pattern, of cultural or natural history in New South Wales.

High Conservation Value Old Growth forest is important for its potential to demonstrate the history of their use and exploitation, as well as key sites demonstrating evidence of Aboriginal occupation over a long time period.

The place is important in demonstrating aesthetic characteristics and/or a high degree of creative or technical achievement in New South Wales.

High Conservation Value Old Growth forest are by the nature of their tall trees areas of aesthetic values which are valued and sought after by the community.

The place has potential to yield information that will contribute to an understanding of the cultural or natural history of New South Wales.

High Conservation Value Old Growth forest is important for its potential to contribute to our understanding of the life cycle of eucalypt forests.

The place possesses uncommon, rare or endangered aspects of the cultural or natural history of New South Wales.

High Conservation Value Old Growth forest is a forest type which is now rare or uncommon at a regional and statewide basis.

They provide a valuable habitat for a wide range of native animal species including a number of rare and endangered species.

== See also ==
- Gondwana Rainforests
- Protected areas of New South Wales
- Forests of Australia
- List of World Heritage Sites in Australia
- Rainforest Way
