= Barool National Park =

National park in New South Wales, Australia

- IUCN category II (national park)
- Location within New South Wales
- Location: New South Wales
- Coordinates: 29°39′37″S 152°11′33″E
- Area: 112.44 km^{2} (43.41 sq mi)
- Established: 1999
- Governing body: National Parks and Wildlife Service (New South Wales)
- Website: http://www.nationalparks.nsw.gov.au

Barool is a national park in New South Wales, Australia, 479 km north of Sydney. It is located north of the River Mann and is characterized by high eucalyptus forests.

29 species of birds have been recorded in the park.

== See also ==
- Protected areas of New South Wales
- High Conservation Value Old Growth forest
