= Bicentennial National Trail =

Multi-use trail in Australia

Georges Creek

The Bicentennial National Trail (BNT), originally known as the National Horse Trail, is one of the longest multi-use, non-motorised, self-reliant trails in the world, stretching 5,330 kilometres from Cooktown, Queensland, through New South Wales and the Australian Capital Territory to Healesville, 60 km north-east of Melbourne. This trail runs the length of the rugged Great Dividing Range through national parks, private property and alongside wilderness areas. The BNT follows old coach roads, stock routes, brumby tracks, rivers and fire trails. It was originally intended for horses, but is these days promoted also for cycling and walking, though it is not yet entirely suited to these two activities.

== History ==
The trail was initiated and planned by the Australian Trail Horse Riders Association. The Association spent many years planning and negotiating a route that linked up the mustering, brumby tracks, pack horse trails, historic coach roads and stock routes, thus providing an opportunity to legally ride the routes of stockmen and drovers who once travelled these areas.

Trail Marker

The development of this idea was left to a committee led by R. M. Williams and coordinated and planned by Brian Taylor in co-operation with the Australian Trail Horse Riders Association affiliated clubs, farmers, landowners and government agencies. Dan Seymour was sponsored by R.M. Williams to find a route along the Great Dividing Range, and to promote enthusiasm for the proposal. Seymour volunteered to ride the Trail and set off from Ferntree Gully, Victoria in February 1972 with two saddle horses, a packhorse and 'Bluey', his blue heeler cattle dog. The Association provided Dan with encouragement during this lengthy journey. His twenty-one month ride finished in Cooktown, Queensland in September 1973. Dan's journey, which was regularly reported, created increased interest in the formation of the Trail.

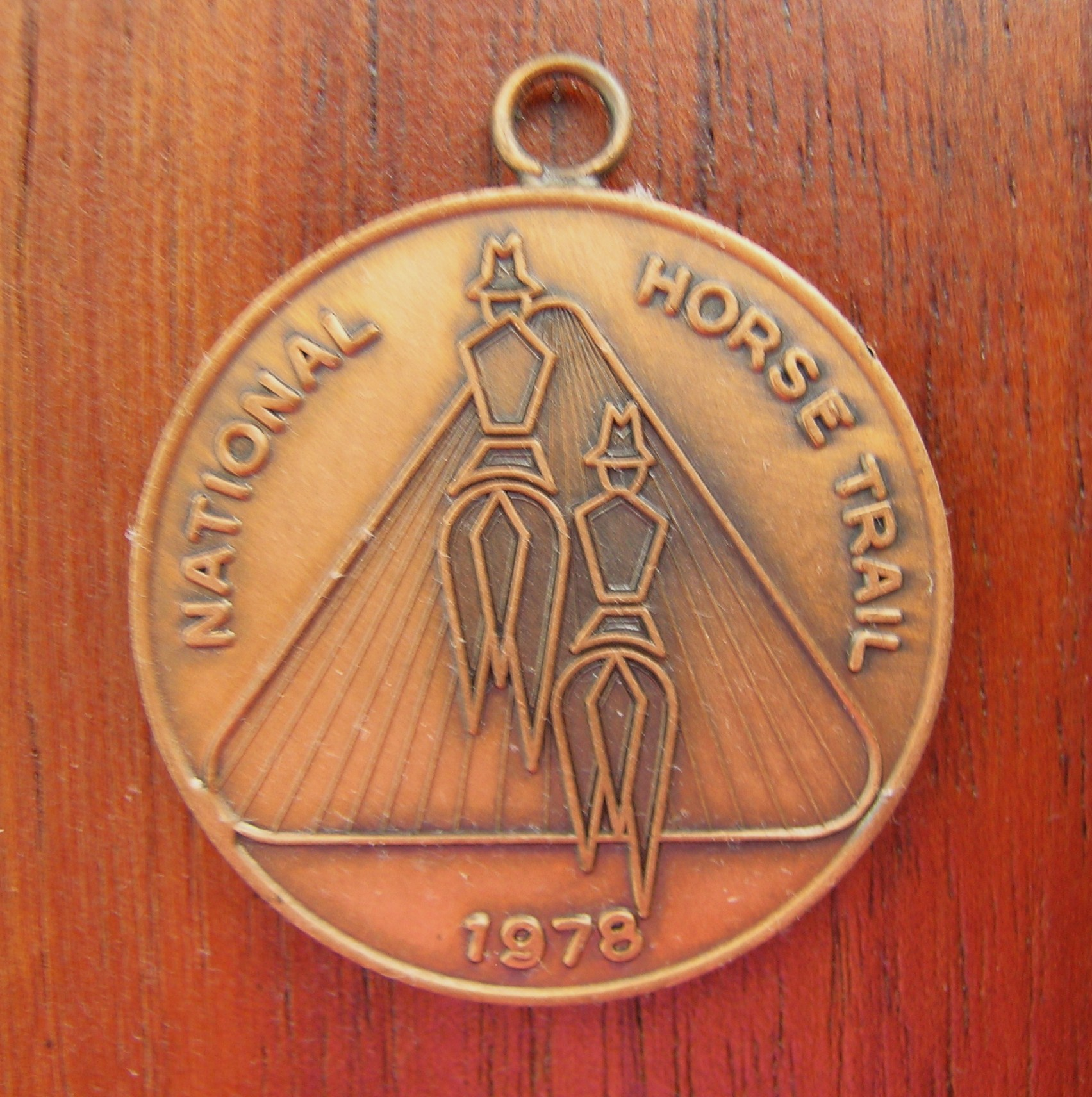
Medallion presented to those who carried the first mail on the BNT

In 1978 the first mail was carried along the route, initially known as the National Horse Trail, from Cooktown by a group of registered riders. These riders were acknowledged with a commemorative medallion.

The Trail committee proposed that the concept be made a project to celebrate Australia's Bicentenary in 1988. The suggestion was accepted, and funding of $300,000 was granted to research, mark a route and print guidebooks. In November 1988, this had been accomplished and the Trail was opened. Since the Trail opened, people have travelled all or parts of the Trail with camels and donkeys, as well as horses and mountain bikes.

== People who have completed the Trail ==
Those who have completed the entire Trail include:

- 1989: Ken Roberts and Sharon Muir Watson (Cooktown to Healesville, with horses). Roberts and Watson were the first to complete the Trail by horse north to south.
- 1991: Arlene Christopherson, Anthony Mair and Melissa Weeks (Healesville to Cooktown, with horses). This party was the first to complete the Trail by horse from south to north.
- 1994: Gabrielle Schenk (Cooktown to Healesville, with horses).
- 1995: Darrell (Doc) Eckley and Robyn Surry (Healesville to Cooktown)
- 1997: Peter Spotswood (Cooktown to Healesville, with horses)

David Wright and Alex McConnell from Cooktown to Healesville, first Mountain bike traverse as part of expedition from Cape York to South Cape Bay, Tasmania

- 1999: Geoff Daniel (Healesville to Cooktown, with horses)
- 1999: Ed and Maria Van Zelderen. (Cooktown to Healsevllle to Cooktown, with horses). The Van Zelderens were the first to ride the Trail in both directions.
- 2000: Urs Marquardt and Karin Heitzmann (Cooktown to Healesville, with horses).
- 2000: Dyane Sabourin and Geoff Grundy, with daughters Angela and Serena (Cooktown to Healesville, with 12 horses)
- 2002: Rainald and Jennifer Feldmeier with children Daniel (10), Jessica (8), Dean (6) and Emily (4). (Tenterfield to Durong with horses and homemade wagon)
- 2003: Therese Hanna (Healesville to Cooktown, with horses).
- 2004: Robert Klei (Cooktown to Healesville on bike).
- 2004: Christian Strobel (Cooktown to Healesville on bike).
- 2005: Roderick MacKenzie (Cooktown to Healesville by bike).
- 2006: Max Watkins (Cooktown to Healesville with donkey Storm).
- 2012: Richard Bowles Ultra marathon runner. First person to run the Bicentennial National Trail (Healesville to Cooktown).
- 2013: Belinda Ritchie (Healesville to Cooktown, with horses).
- 2013: Ben Dyer (Healesville to Cooktown, on foot).
- 2015: Kathryn Holzberger and Preston Stroud (Cooktown to Healesville with horses).
- 2015: Carol Geraghty and her sons Ned and Jacob (Healesville to Cooktown, Carol on foot and the boys on horses).
- 2015: Vincent Brouille (on a bike).
- 2017: Tegan Streeter & Tom Richards bike trekkers (Healesville to Cooktown).
- 2017: Kimberley Delavere & Archie / Clem Horse Trekker (Healesville to Cooktown).
- 2017: Eliza and Zaydee Allen (with horse and donkeys).
- 2017: Aliénor le Gouvello (Healesville to Cooktown, with three horses)
- 2018: Zoran Borzic & Rhonda Charles (with horses).
- 2018: Alec Johnson & Fred Van der Elst (Cooktown to Healesville on foot).
- 2019: Arthur Aebischer and Lyn Kincaid (Healesville to Cooktown, cycling )
- 2021: Thomas Lewthwaite (Warrnambool to Healesville to Cape York, on foot)
- 2021: Allison Irvine (Healesville to Cooktown, cycling )
- 2021: Belinda, Flo and Aimee (in baby backpack, walking, Cooktown to Healesville)
- 2021: Eric Dong (Healesville to Cooktown, on a donkey)
- 2021: Sacha Wynter (Healesville to Glen Innes, then Cooktown to Glen Innes - on foot and bike)

2021 Ken Allam (Cooktown to Healsville on Foot. Started 17th April 2021 Completed 30th January 2022)

2026: Nikki Tomsett (Healesville to Cooktown. With horses Denny, Splitear and Banjo. Completed August 2026).

== The Trail ==
In the rainforest with packhorses The Creb track

The Trail links eighteen of Australia's national parks and more than 50 state forests, providing access to some of the wildest, most remote country in the world. The Trail is suitable for self-reliant horse riders, walkers and mountain bike riders. Parts of the Trail, such as some of the Jenolan Caves to Kosciuszko section, are suitable for horse-drawn vehicles. The Trail is not open to motorised vehicles or trail bikes, and pets are not permitted. The Trail is divided into 12 sections of 400 to 500 kilometres, each with a corresponding guide book.

1. Cooktown to Gunnawarra; the Trail passes through rain forest, gold fields and historical tin mining towns.
2. Gunnawarra to Collinsville, through the grazing country of far north Queensland.
3. Collinsville to Kabra
4. Kabra to Biggenden
5. Biggenden to Blackbutt
6. Blackbutt, Queensland to the New South Wales border at Cullendore; this section of the Trail follows the Brisbane Valley Rail Trail.
7. Killarney to Ebor; this is a rugged remote section that follows the Guy Fawkes River through Guy Fawkes River National Park and across Waterfall Way.
8. Ebor to Barrington Tops; another rugged remote section that passes through Oxley Wild Rivers National Park. After passing Ebor the trail crosses the Point Lookout Road before it passes briefly through Cunnawarra National Park. It then runs on the east of Georges River until it crosses the Armidale to Kempsey Road. The Trail is mostly unmarked as it follows the Macleay River past the historic East Kunderang homestead in Oxley Wild Rivers National Park. Following Kunderang Brook it winds its way to mustering huts at Left Hand Hut, the remote Middle Yards Hut, Youdale's Hut and to Cedar Creek on the edge of Werrikimbe National Park. After crossing the Oxley Highway the Trail passes through the Mummel Gulf National Park. This section takes at least five days to travel and all food and equipment has to be carried. There are numerous creek and river crossings, with some steep ascents and descents.
9. Barrington Tops to Jenolan Caves
10. Jenolan Caves to Kosciuszko
11. Mount Kosciuszko to Omeo, including the Tom Groggin Track
12. Omeo to Healesville, near Melbourne

== Route ==
Coordinate	Location
15.467°S 145.283°E	Cooktown, Queensland
17.890°S 145.072°E	Gunnawarra, Queensland
20.55°S 147.85°E	Collinsville, Queensland
23.51°S 150.40°E	Kabra, Queensland
25.517°S 152.05°E	Biggenden, Queensland
26.883°S 152.1°E	Blackbutt, Queensland
28.333°S 152.3°E	Killarney, Queensland
30.4°S 152.35°E	Ebor, New South Wales
30.625°S 152.217°E	Cunnawarra National Park
30.996°S 152.01°E	Oxley Wild Rivers National Park
31.2°S 152.233°E	Werrikimbe National Park
31.313°S 151.844°E	Mummel Gulf National Park
32.053°S 151.494°E	Barrington Tops National Park
36.456°S 148.263°E	Mount Kosciuszko
37.1°S 147.6°E	Omeo, Victoria
37.656°S 145.514°E	Healesville, Victoria

== See also ==
- List of long-distance hiking tracks in Australia
