= Henry River (New South Wales) =

Coordinates: 29°51′S 152°08′E

Henry River Little Henry River, North Branch of Little Henry River

Location
- Country: Australia
- State: New South Wales
- Region: NSW North Coast (IBRA), Northern Tablelands
- local government area: Clarence Valley

Physical characteristics
- Source: Mitchell Hill, Great Dividing Range
  - location: near Bald Nob
  - elevation: 1,100 m (3,600 ft)
- Mouth: confluence with the Mann River
  - location: near Newtown Boyd
  - elevation: 275 m (902 ft)
- Length: 74 km (46 mi)

Basin features
- River system: Clarence River catchment
- Nature reserve: Mann River Nature Reserve

Henry River, a perennial stream of the Clarence River catchment, is located in the Northern Tablelands district of New South Wales, Australia.

== Course and features ==
Henry River rises below Mitchell Hill, on the slopes of the Great Dividing Range, near Bald Nob and flows generally east and north, before reaching its confluence with the Mann River, near Newton Boyd. The river descends 829 metres (2,720 ft) over its 74 kilometres (46 mi) course; and flows through the Mann River Nature Reserve.

== See also ==
- Rivers of New South Wales
