= Warra National Park =

National park in New South Wales, Australia

- IUCN category II (national park)
- Location within New South Wales
- Location: New South Wales
- Coordinates: 29°59′30″S 151°55′48″E
- Area: 19.2 km^{2} (7.4 sq mi)
- Established: 1999
- Governing body: NSW National Parks & Wildlife Service
- Website: Official website

Warra is a national park in New South Wales, Australia, 438 km north of Sydney.

The average elevation of the terrain is 3,773 ft.

== See also ==
- Protected areas of New South Wales
- High Conservation Value Old Growth forest
