= Capoompeta National Park =

National park in New South Wales, Australia

- IUCN category II (national park)
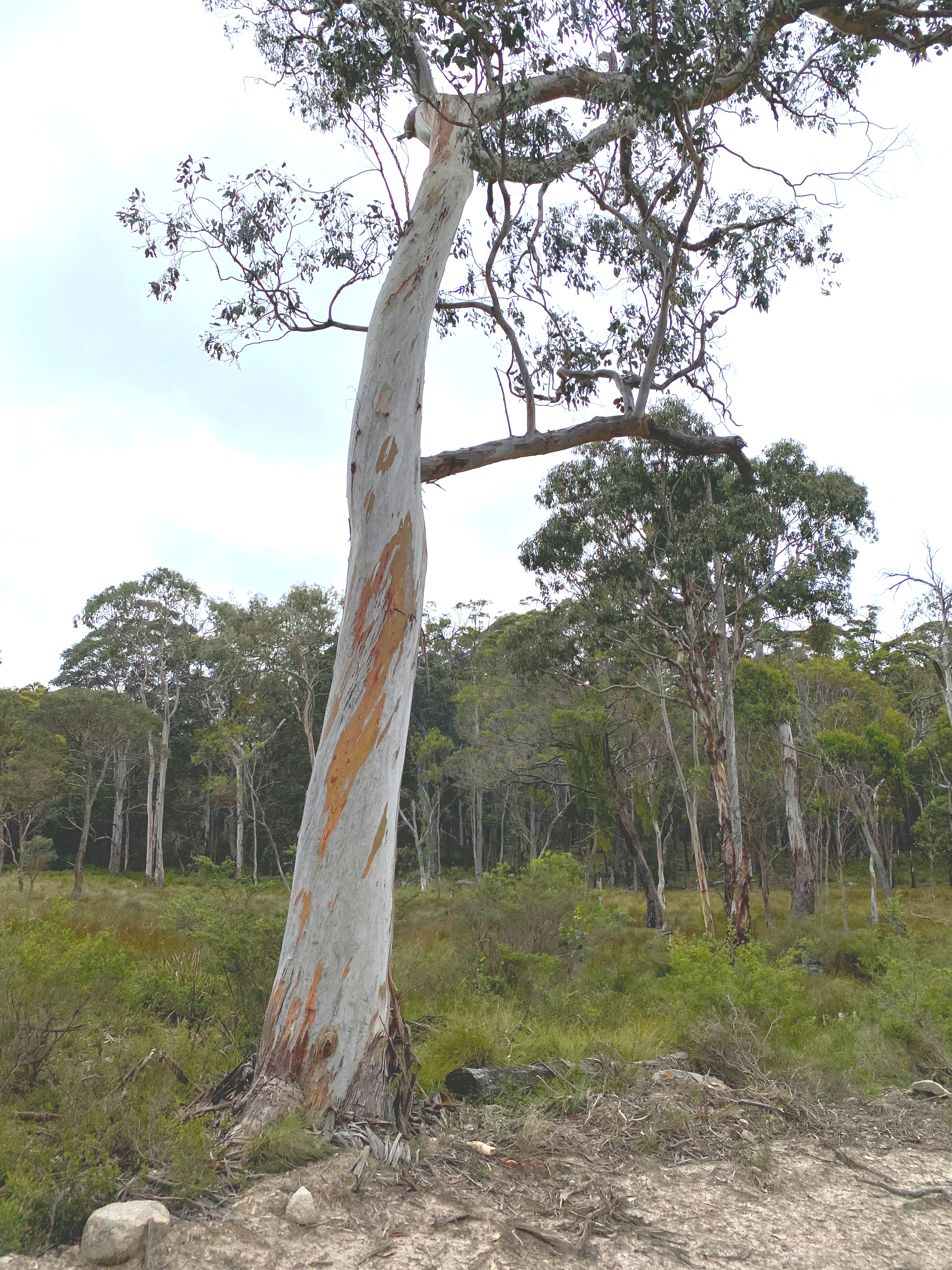
- Finegans Gap Trail

- Location within New South Wales
- Location: New South Wales
- Coordinates: 29°23′34″S 152°00′32″E
- Area: 39 km^{2} (15 sq mi)
- Established: 1999
- Governing body: NSW National Parks & Wildlife Service
- Website: https://www.nationalparks.nsw.gov.au/visit-a-park/parks/Capoompeta-National-Park

Capoompeta is a national park in New South Wales, Australia, 505 kilometres (314 mi) north of Sydney. The park is mountainous with dry forests and rainforests, with fern basins and with important areas for wildlife. Apart from the picturesque roads leading to Glen Innes (68 km), Deepwater (28 km) and Tenterfield (42 km) there are no facilities in the park.

== See also ==
- Protected areas of New South Wales
- High Conservation Value Old Growth forest
