= Indwarra National Park =

National park in New South Wales, Australia

- IUCN category Ia (strict nature reserve)
- Location within New South Wales
- Location: New South Wales
- Coordinates: 30°05′08″S 151°15′02″E
- Area: 9 km^{2} (3.5 sq mi)
- Established: 1999
- Governing body: NSW National Parks & Wildlife Service
- Website: Official website

Indwarra is a national park in New South Wales, Australia, 422 km north of Sydney. It is located on the central New England Tablelands and covers an area of over 900ha.

The park was created in January 1999. Flora surveys were conducted in 2002, revealing 220 species of flora in the park. The highest and most prominent mountain in the national park is Mount Tingha, which rises to 1208 metres above sea level.

== See also ==
- Protected areas of New South Wales
- High Conservation Value Old Growth forest
