= Sara River =

Coordinates: 29°57′S 152°16′E

Sara River Mitchell River

Location
- Country: Australia
- State: New South Wales
- IBRA: New England Tablelands
- District: New England, Northern Tablelands
- Municipalities: Glen Innes Severn, Clarence Valley

Physical characteristics
- Source: Mount Mitchell, Great Dividing Range
  - location: east of Ben Lomond
  - elevation: 1,300 m (4,300 ft)
- Mouth: confluence with the Guy Fawkes River to form the Boyd River
  - location: within Guy Fawkes River National Park
  - elevation: 304 m (997 ft)
- Length: 97 km (60 mi)

Basin features
- River system: Clarence River catchment
- Tributaries
  - right: Oban River, Nowlands Creek, Bobs Creek, Backwater Creek
- National parks: Guy Fawkes River NP, Chaelundi NP

Sara River, a perennial stream that is part of the Clarence River catchment, is located in the New England and Northern Tablelands districts of New South Wales, Australia.

== Course and features ==
Sara River rises on the southern slopes of Mount Mitchell on the western slopes of the Great Dividing Range, east of Ben Lomond, and flows generally to the east, joined by three tributaries, including Oban River, before forming its confluence with the Guy Fawkes River to form the Boyd River within Guy Fawkes River National Park and Chaelundi National Park. Sara River descends 995 metres (3,264 ft) over its 97 kilometres (60 mi) course.

== See also ==
- List of rivers of Australia
