= Ebor Falls =

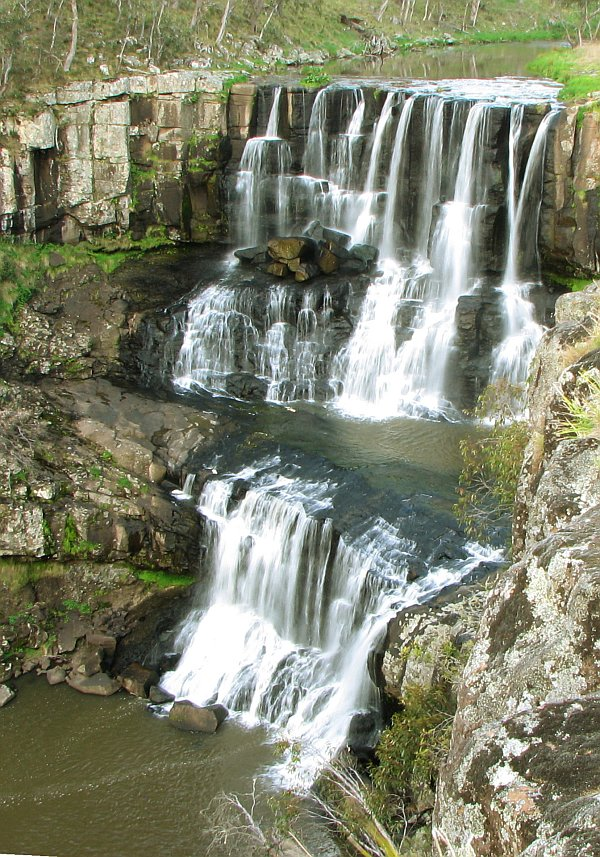
- Upper Ebor Falls

- Location within New South Wales
- Location: New England, New South Wales, Australia
- Coordinates: 30°24′08″S 152°20′30″E
- Type: Tiered
- Total height: 115 metres (377 ft)
- Number of drops: 2
- Watercourse: Guy Fawkes River

Ebor Falls is a tiered waterfall on the Guy Fawkes River, located near Ebor and about 37 kilometres (23 mi) north-east of Wollomombi on Waterfall Way in the New England region of New South Wales, Australia.

== Location and features ==
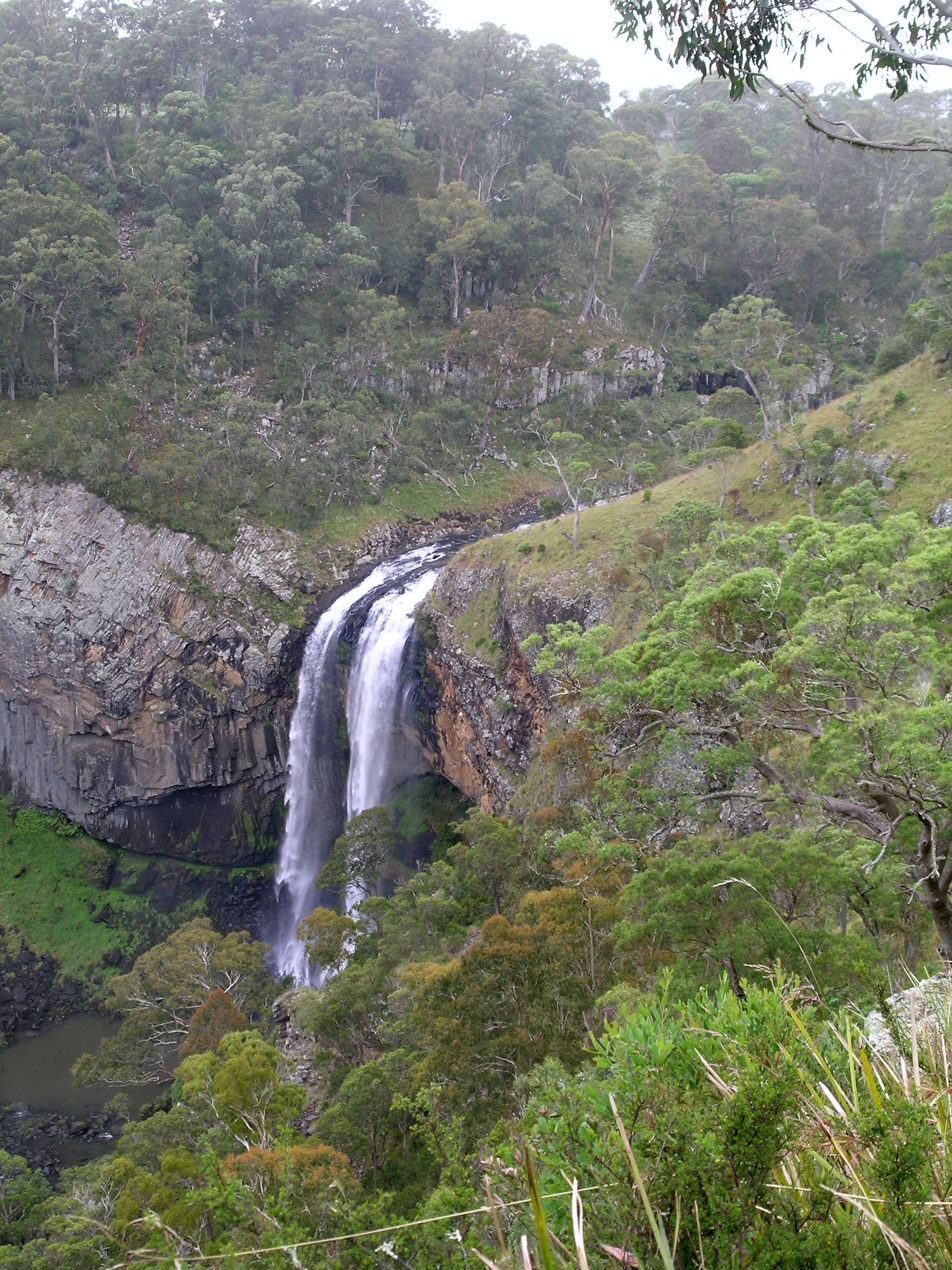
Lower Ebor Falls.

The first lookout is on a sealed road, approximately 200 metres (660 ft) off the Waterfall Way. This viewing platform shows the upper falls tumbling 115 metres (377 ft) over 4 layers of columned basalt rock in two falls. The lower Ebor falls, 190 metres (620 ft) further on, plunge over Permian sedimentary rocks into a steep forested gorge below.

The falls are a well known tourist attraction within Guy Fawkes River National Park, with viewing platforms of the falls and walking tracks, a rest area with barbecues, an information display, picnic tables and toilet. In 2008 the waterfalls were attracting up to 80,000 visitors each year. Camping is not permitted at Ebor Falls, however camping is available at nearby Cathedral Rock National Park.

The falls were first protected in a recreation reserve in 1895. In September 2008 new lookout platforms were opened. These replaced platforms that were destroyed by fire in 2007.

== History ==
Ebor Falls began to form around 19 million years ago with lava flows from the nearby extinct Ebor Volcano.

The traditional owners of Ebor Falls are the Gumbaynggirr people, who call the falls Martiam, an Aboriginal expression meaning "the great falls".

== See also ==
- List of waterfalls
- List of waterfalls in Australia
