= Mebbin National Park =

National park in New South Wales, Australia

- IUCN category II (national park)
- Location within New South Wales
- Location: New South Wales
- Coordinates: 28°26′49″S 153°10′13″E
- Area: 38 km^{2} (15 sq mi)
- Governing body: National Parks and Wildlife Service (New South Wales)

Mebbin is a national park located in New South Wales, Australia, 633 kilometres (393 mi) north of Sydney. It is part of the Shield Volcano Group of the World Heritage Site Gondwana Rainforests of Australia inscribed in 1983 and added to the Australian National Heritage List in 2007. It is also part of the Scenic Rim Important Bird Area, identified as such by BirdLife International because of its importance in the conservation of several species of threatened birds.

This is a paradise for nature lovers, a great place for hiking, picnicking, camping, cycling or horseback riding.

== See also ==
- Protected areas of New South Wales
- High Conservation Value Old Growth forest
