= Richard Bowles =

Australian ultramarathon runner

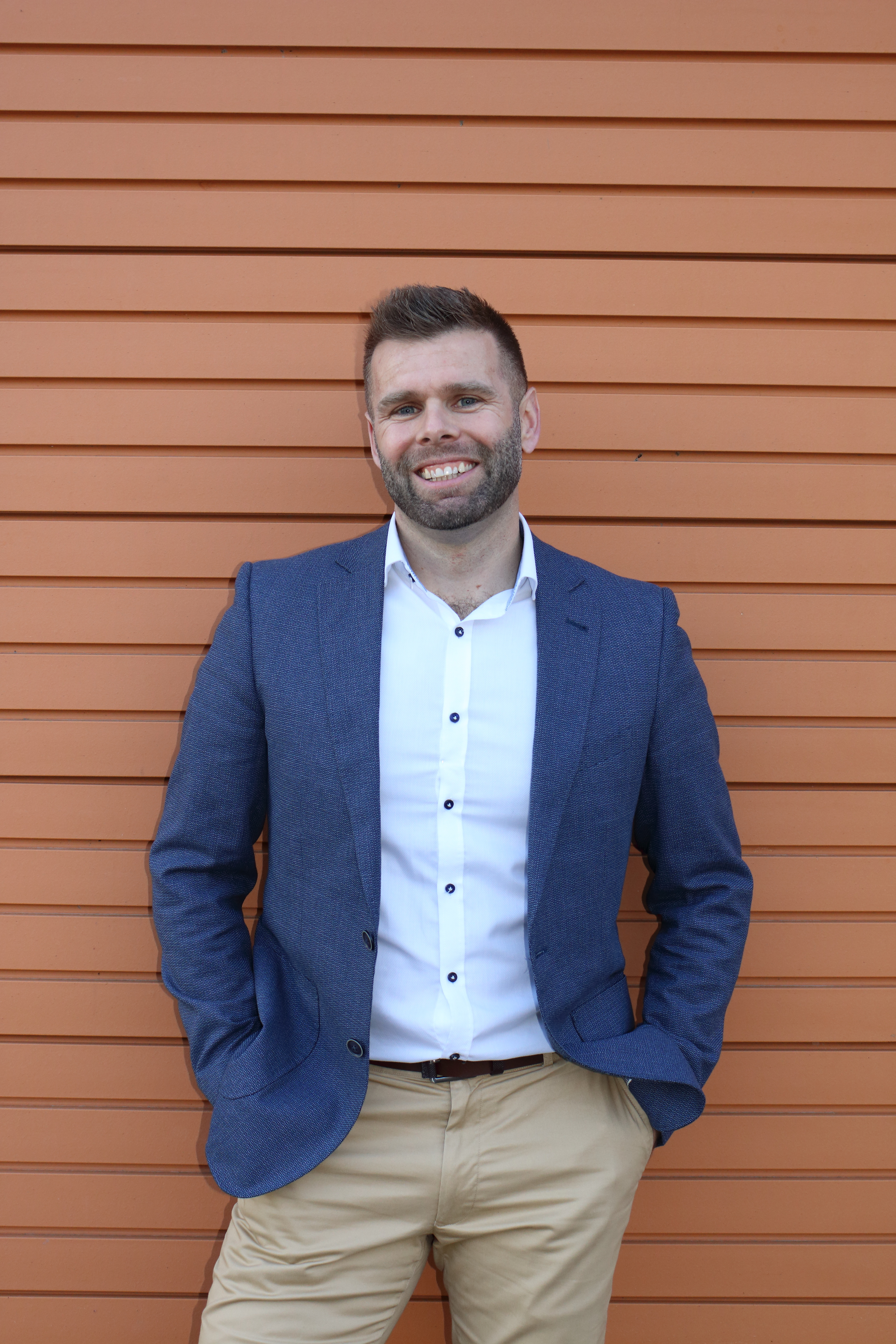
Richard Bowles

Richard Bowles (born 19 September 1978, in Leicester, England) is an adventure, corporate educator and professional dog trainer who holds several records in endurance running. In 2012, Bowles became the first person to run Australia's Bicentennial National Trail (BNT). Running from Healesville, Victoria to Cooktown, Queensland, he covered 5,330 km in five months.

Two weeks after completing the BNT, Bowles ran New Zealand's Te Araroa at 3,054 km becoming the first person to complete it.

In 2013 Bowles ran the Israel National Trail, covering its 1,009 km length in 13 days after a life-threatening foot infection delayed his original plan of 12 days.

Later that year, he became the first person to run an exploding volcano, Mount Sinabung in North Sumatra, after covering 800 km from the east of the island to its west.

In 2014 Bowles completed South Australia's 1,200 km Heysen Trail, averaging 85 km a day in 14 days, smashing the previous 25-day record.

In 2017 Dr Ricardo Costa of Monash University approached Bowles about testing his endurance fitness. Bowles ran 50 km a day for two weeks on a treadmill in a 32 °C climate-controlled tent while carrying 12 kg. This was to replicate multi-stage races and the nutrition requirements needed in desert environments.

In 2018 Bowles lived with and studied the Marathon Monks of Mount Hiei Japan who take on the kaihōgyō, a spiritual challenge of endurance in pursuit of enlightenment. The journey lasts over seven years, and the stakes are high. If they fail, the monk must perform Hara-kiri – 'honourable suicide'.

2019 he lived and worked on the streets of India for a week surviving on AU$2:00 a day; to experience the lives of the Rickshaw Wallahs.

2022, he worked a week in the death industry, collecting and preparing bodies and organising funerals.

== Other adventure achievements ==
- 2010 – Tenzing Hillary Everest Marathon, Nepal – Australian Record Holder 2010
- 2010 – Mind Alpine Challenge, Alpine Region, Victoria, Australia 160 km Overall Winners Team Outer Edge
- 2010 – Wilsons Prom 48 km, Wilsons Promontory, Victoria, Australia – former Course Record Holder 2010
- 2011 – Tasmanian 3 Peaks Race, 60 km Launceston – Hobart, Overall Winners.
- 2012 – The Australian Bicentennial National Trail 5330 km – First to run the trail's entirety in 5.5 months – World-Record-Holder
- 2012 – Te Araroa Trail (New Zealand) 3054 km – First to run the trail's entirety in 65 days – World-Record-Holder
- 2012 – Ran over 10,160 kilometres of trail, equivalent to over 240 marathons
- 2013 – Israel National Trail (Israel)1009 km – Ran the trail entirety in 14 days.
- 2013 – First to run around an exploding volcano in Northern Sumatra
- 2014 – Baw Baw to Bourke Street, a three-day running record from Mt Baw Baw in Melbourne, Australia – to Bourke Street in the city's CBD
- 2014 – Heysen Trail, South Australia 1200 km – 14-day record end to end. Former World-Record-Holder
- 2016 – 250 km Heated Tent Run for Monash University research project into endurance
- 2019 – One on One insight into the kaihōgyō ("circling the mountain") is an ascetic practice performed by Tendai Buddhist monks. A 1,000 days of marathons.
- 2019 – Pulled a hand-rickshaw in Kolkata, India while living and working as a wallah for one week. surviving on UD$2.00 a day
- 2022 － Worked in the death industry for a week, collecting the dead, preparing and organising funerals to gain insight into compassion.
