= Butterleaf National Park =

National park in New South Wales, Australia

- IUCN category II (national park)
- Location within New South Wales
- Location: New South Wales
- Coordinates: 29°31′08″S 152°00′43″E
- Area: 30 km^{2} (12 sq mi)
- Established: 1999
- Governing body: NSW National Parks & Wildlife Service
- Website: http://www.nationalparks.nsw.gov.au/visit-a-park/parks/Butterleaf-National-Park

Butterleaf is a national park in New South Wales, Australia, 491 kilometres (305 mi) north of Sydney.

In the park there is an old forest with huge trees with holes in it, which provide a home for many living creatures. Such as powerful owls, yellow-bellied, and greater gliders.

== See also ==
- Protected areas of New South Wales
- High Conservation Value Old Growth forest
