= Yarrow River =

Coordinates: 29°42′S 152°03′E

Location
- Country: Australia
- State: New South Wales
- Region: Northern Tablelands
- Local government area: Glen Innes Severn

Physical characteristics
- Source: Mitchell Hill, Great Dividing Range
  - location: near Glencoe
  - elevation: 1,260 m (4,130 ft)
- Mouth: confluence with the Mann River
  - location: near Oakdale and east of Glen Innes
  - elevation: 604 m (1,982 ft)
- Length: 43 km (27 mi)

Basin features
- River system: Clarence River catchment
- Nature reserve: Mann River Nature Reserve

Yarrow River, a perennial stream of the Clarence River catchment, is located in the Northern Tablelands district of New South Wales, Australia.

== Course and features ==
Yarrow River rises below Mitchell Hill, on the slopes of the Great Dividing Range, near Glencoe and flows generally north east, before reaching its confluence with the Mann River, near Oakdale and east of Glen Innes. The river descends 652 metres (2,139 ft) over its 43 kilometres (27 mi) course; and flows through the Mann River Nature Reserve.

== See also ==
- Rivers of New South Wales
