= Guy Fawkes River National Park =

National park in Australia

- IUCN category Ib (wilderness area)
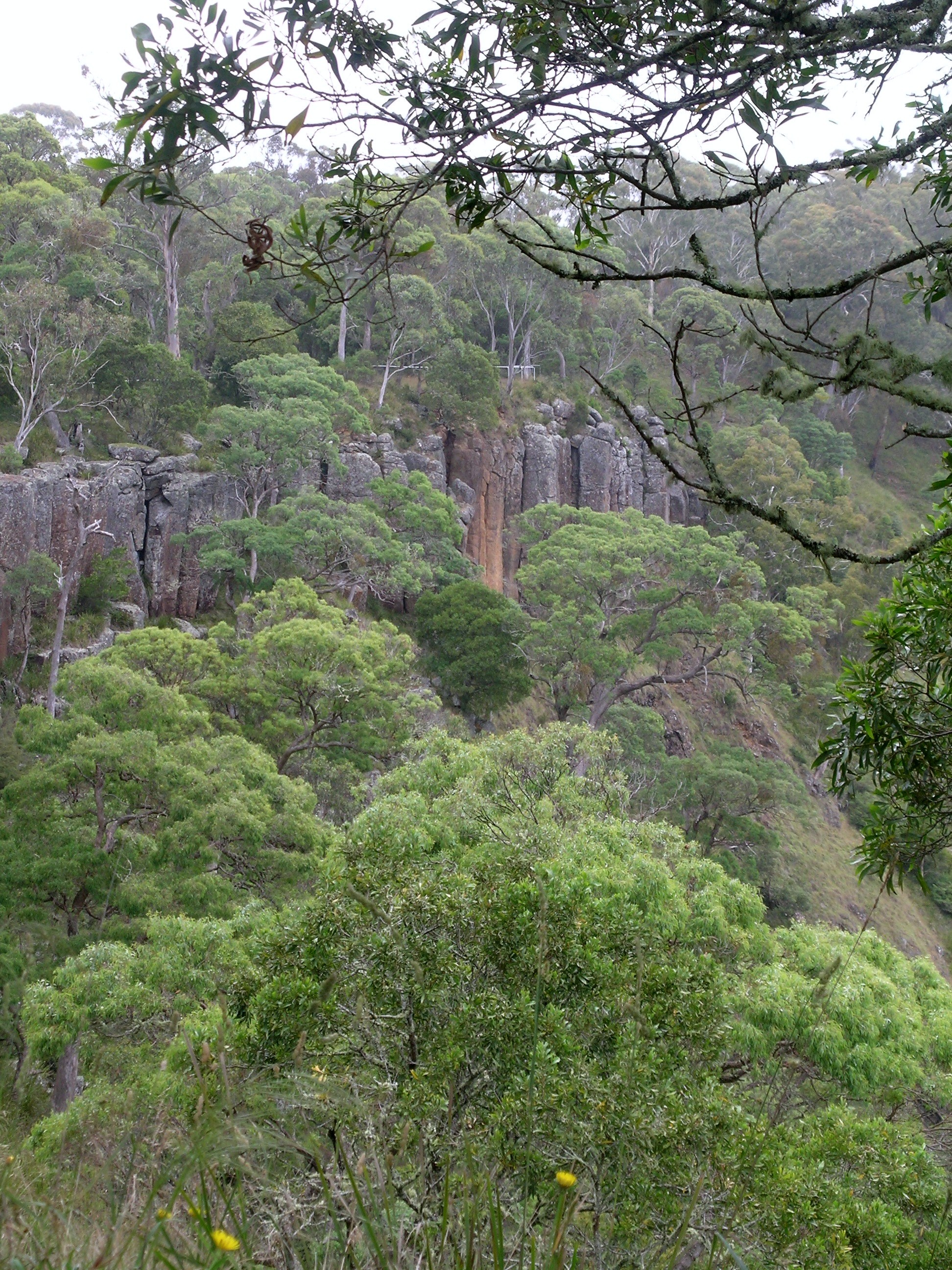
- Guy Fawkes River National Park, NSW

- Location within New South Wales
- Location: New South Wales
- Nearest city: Armidale
- Coordinates: 29°57′47″S 152°14′00″E
- Area: 1,005.90 km^{2} (388.38 sq mi)
- Established: 1972
- Governing body: NSW National Parks and Wildlife Service
- Website: Official website

Guy Fawkes River National Park, a national park comprising 100,590 hectares (248,600 acres), is located on the eastern edge of the New England Tablelands and the western edge of the Dorrigo Plateau, in north eastern New South Wales, Australia.

Access to the national park via Waterfall Way, is near Ebor, 46 kilometres (29 mi) south-west of Dorrigo and 80 kilometres (50 mi) north-east of Armidale. The national park is approximately 560 kilometres (350 mi) north of Sydney. Additional access points to more remote parts of the national park are via the Armidale-Grafton Road, via Marengo Road at Hernani, Sheepstation Creek Road at Dundurrabin, Ellis Road and Boundary Creek Road south of Nymboida; or from the Old Grafton-Glen Innes Road, via Chaelundi Road at Dalmorton. From the west, the national park is accessible via Wards Mistake.

Guy Fawkes River National Park has over 40 different vegetation communities, 28 threatened plant species, 24 threatened fauna species and significant areas of old-growth forest protected within the park. The Guy Fawkes River plunges off the Northern Tablelands at the Ebor Falls. There are spectacular examples of valley and rugged river gorges including the deeply incised Guy Fawkes River Valley along the line of an ancient fault through the park. The rugged gorges of the Aberfoyle, Sara and Henry rivers also run through the park.

== Features ==
Wild horses have lived in this park since the 1930s. In October 2000, over 600 horses in the Guy Fawkes River National Park were shot and killed from a helicopter during a controversial cull by the NSW National Parks and Wildlife Service. In response to public outcry, the Minister for the Environment, Mr Bob Debus, commissioned a study into the heritage value of horses in the park and indicated that, should the horses be found to have genuine heritage significance, they would be humanely removed from the park so that they can be managed properly in another location by people with an interest in their heritage value. In February 2002, the final report by the Heritage Working Party found that these horses had significant historical, military and cultural value. They are direct descendants of Australia's wartime cavalry horses, known as Walers, and are the only group of Australian wild horse to have proven heritage value. Since the campaign began to remove horses from there over 400 have been passively trapped, taken from the park, and 200 of these have been found a home elsewhere. The Guy Fawkes Heritage Horse Association (GFHHA) takes possession of horses passively removed from the GFRNP and offer them for sale to the public, they also manage the horses to maintain their inherent characteristics and to preserve the unique genetics of these wild horses. A formal register and Stud Book has been established for these purposes. The GFHHA also actively promotes the GF horse versatility by sponsoring classes held at local Ag Shows and encouraging horse owners to participate in all disciplines.

In the 1970s the Bicentennial National Trail was plotted to run along the western side of Guy Fawkes River on what is a travelling stock route.

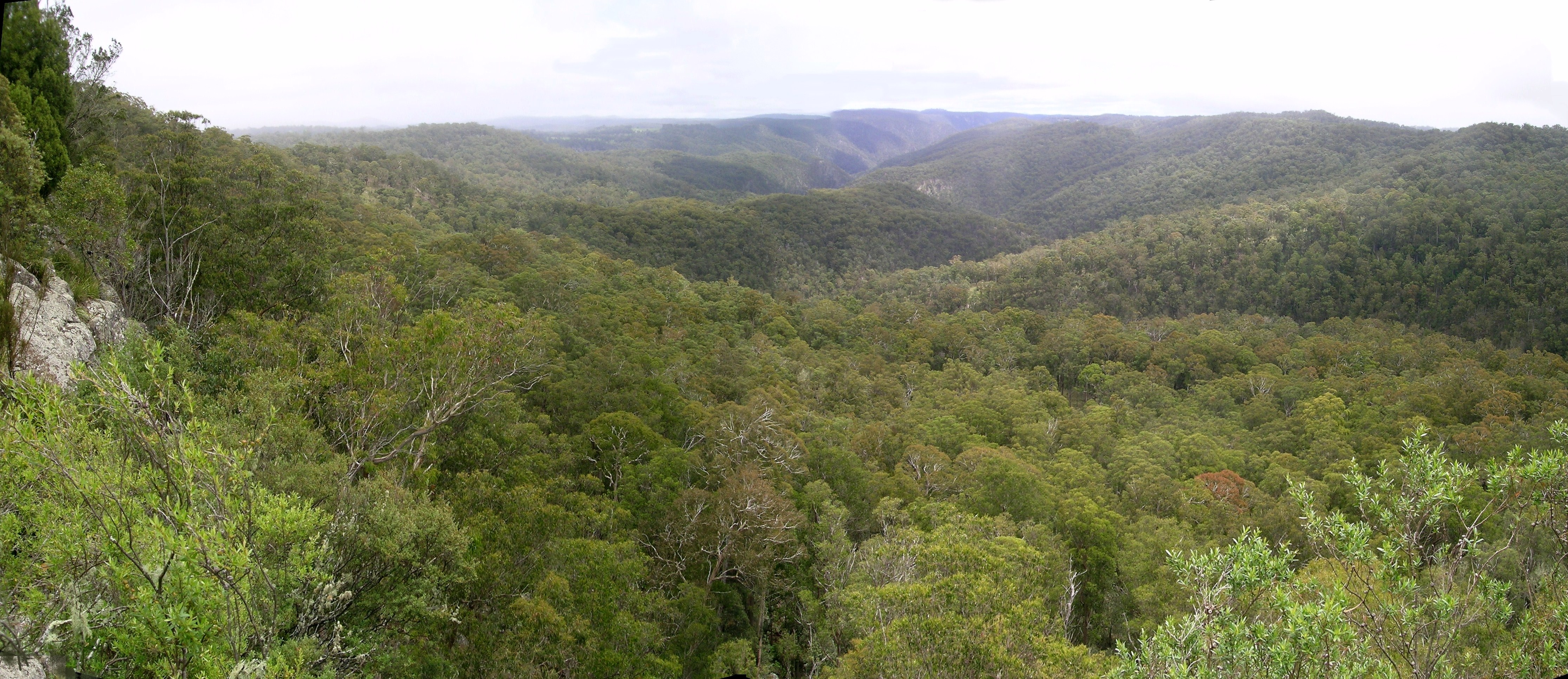
Guy Fawkes River National Park

== See also ==
- Boyd River
- Chaelundi National Park
- Guy Fawkes
- Protected areas of New South Wales
- Sara River
- High Conservation Value Old Growth forest
