= Moore Park Nature Reserve =

Protected area in New South Wales, Australia

- IUCN category IV (habitat/species management area)
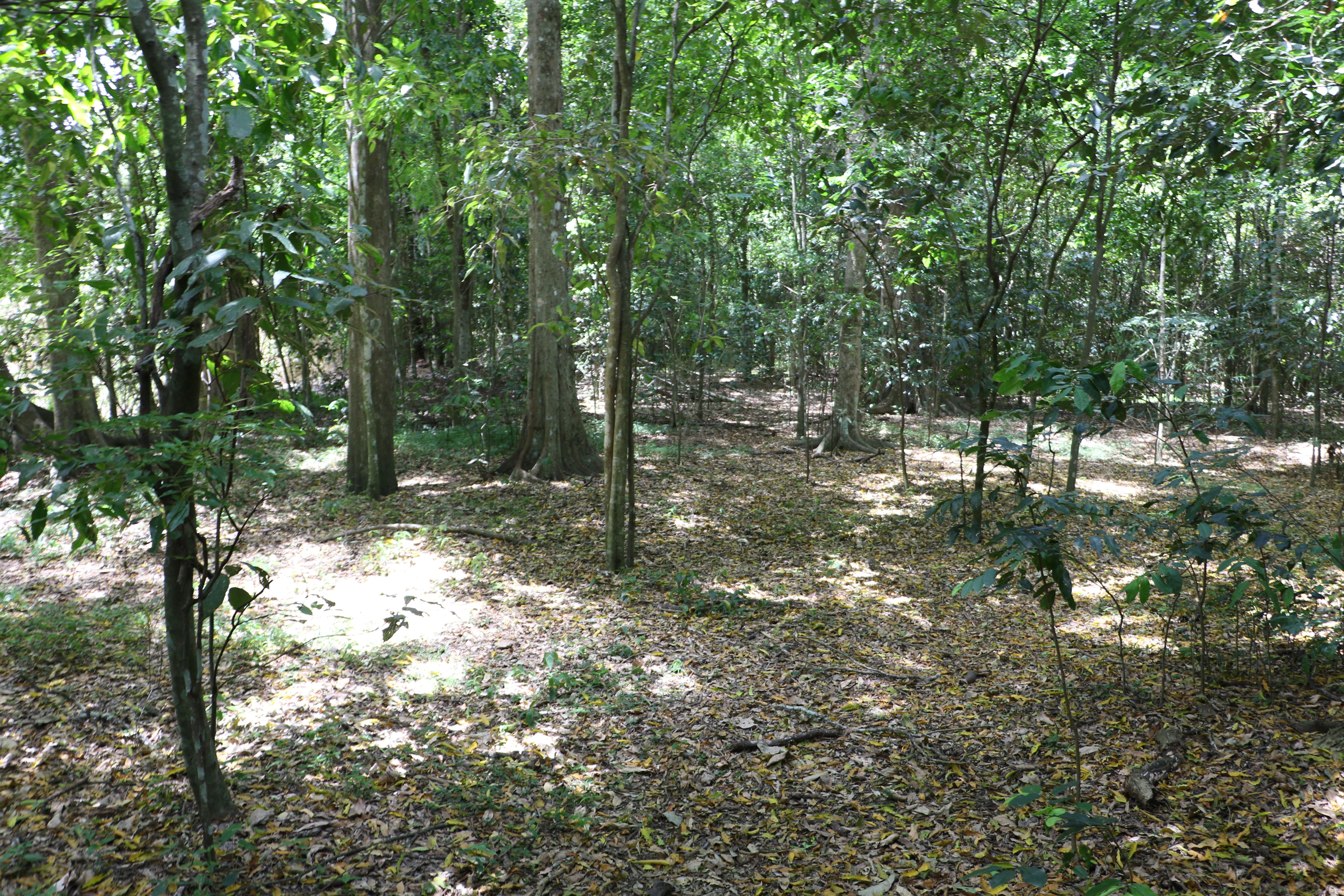
- dry rainforest at Moore Park Nature Reserve

- Location within New South Wales
- Location: New South Wales
- Nearest city: Kyogle
- Coordinates: 28°26′14″S 152°52′45″E
- Area: 9 ha (22 acres)
- Established
- Governing body: NSW National Parks & Wildlife Service
- Website: Official website

Moore Park Nature Reserve is a small remnant of "dry" rainforest in Northern New South Wales. It lies at the confluence of Findon Creek and the Richmond River. It was once part of a larger rainforest known as Boyd's Scrub. A colony of flying foxes lives in the rainforest.

The forest is dominated by a large Moreton Bay fig. Other canopy species include the black bean, silky oak, plum pine and native elm.

This country traditionally belongs to the Githabul Aboriginal people, for whom the rainforest was a very important source of food.

== See also ==
- Protected areas of New South Wales
- High Conservation Value Old Growth forest
