= Guy Fawkes River =

Coordinates: 29°57′S 152°16′E

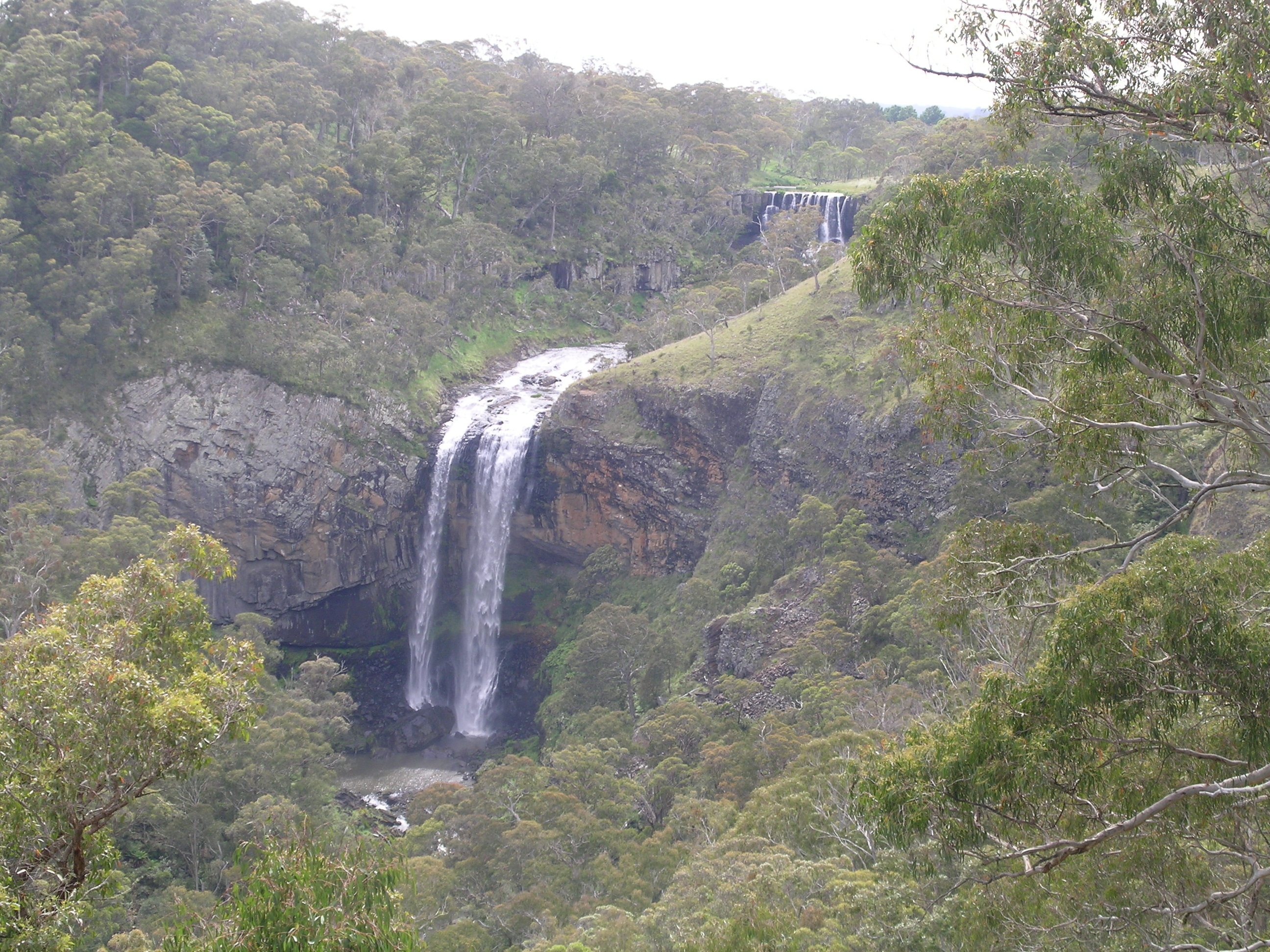
- Upper and lower Ebor Falls, within Guy Fawkes River National Park, 2008
- Etymology: Explored by European settlers on Guy Fawkes Day, 1845

Location
- Country: Australia
- State: New South Wales
- IBRA: New England Tablelands
- District: New England, Northern Tablelands
- Municipality: Guyra

Physical characteristics
- Source: Snowy Range, Great Dividing Range
  - location: southeast of Ebor
  - elevation: 1,410 m (4,630 ft)
- Mouth: confluence with the Sara River to form the Boyd River
  - location: within Guy Fawkes River National Park
  - elevation: 304 m (997 ft)
- Length: 101 km (63 mi)

Basin features
- River system: Clarence River catchment
- Tributaries
  - left: Aberfoyle River, Doughboy Creek
  - right: Pantons Creek, Marengo Creek
- National park: Guy Fawkes River NP

Guy Fawkes River, a perennial stream that is part of the Clarence River catchment, is in the New England and Northern Tablelands districts of New South Wales, Australia.

== Course and features ==
Guy Fawkes River rises below Majors Point, on the northern slopes of the Snowy Range, an eastern spur of the Great Dividing Range, east of the village of Ebor. The river spills over the 115 metres (377 ft) columned basalt rock Ebor Falls, and enters a deep valley, joined by four tributaries, including Aberfoyle River, flowing generally northward and eventually forming its confluence with the Sara River to form the Boyd River. The river descends 1,110 metres (3,640 ft) over its 101 kilometres (63 mi) course; and passes below Round Mountain, the highest peak of the Northern Tablelands.

The river's course generally runs from the south to north along the valley of the Demon Fault Line, within the Guy Fawkes River National Park. Adjoining the national park are the Guy Fawkes River Nature Reserve and Guy Fawkes River State Conservation Area.

The Bicentennial National Trail runs along the western side of Guy Fawkes River on what is a travelling stock route.

The largest of the Grevillea genus, southern silky oak, or Grevillea robusta, is distributed in the Guy Fawkes River area, which is the southern limit of its natural environment. It has attractive orange-yellow flowers and may reach up to 35 metres (115 ft) with a trunk diameter in excess of 1 metre (3 ft 3 in).

== Name ==
The river is named after Guy Fawkes Day. Major Edward Parke named the Guy Fawkes River after camping nearby on Guy Fawkes Day, 5 November 1845.

== See also ==
- Rivers of New South Wales
