= Boyd River (New South Wales) =

Boyd River Little River

Location
- Country: Australia
- State: New South Wales
- IBRA: New England Tablelands
- District: Northern Tablelands
- Municipality: Clarence Valley

Physical characteristics
- Source confluence: Sara and Guy Fawkes Rivers
  - location: Guy Fawkes River National Park
  - coordinates: 29.94071°S 152.27192°E
  - elevation: 326 m (1,070 ft)
- Mouth: Nymboida River
  - location: Buccarumbi, Clarence Valley Council
  - coordinates: 29.83672°S 152.59038°E
  - elevation: 159 m (522 ft)
- Length: 64 km (40 mi)

Basin features
- Progression: Nymboida → Mann → Clarence → Coral Sea
- River system: Clarence River catchment
- Tributaries
  - right: Chandlers Creek
- National parks: Guy Fawkes River NP, Chaelundi NP

Boyd River, a perennial stream that is part of the Clarence River catchment, is located in the Northern Tablelands district of New South Wales, Australia.

== Course ==
Formed by the confluence of the Sara River and the Guy Fawkes River, Boyd River rises within Guy Fawkes River National Park and Chaelundi National Park, below the Dorrigo Plateau within the Great Dividing Range, east southeast of Glen Innes, and flows generally to the north and east, joined by one minor tributary towards its confluence with Nymboida River, at Buccarumbi, west of Coutts Crossing. The river descends 167 metres (548 ft) over its 68 kilometres (42 mi) course.

== See also ==
- Rivers of New South Wales
