= Little Llangothlin Nature Reserve =

- IUCN category IV (habitat/species management area)
- Location within New South Wales
- Location: New South Wales
- Nearest city: Llangothlin
- Coordinates: 30°05′S 151°47′E
- Area: 2.57 km^{2} (0.99 sq mi)
- Established: December 1979
- Governing body: NSW National Parks and Wildlife Service
- Website: Official website

Ramsar Wetland
- Designated: 17 March 1996
- Reference no.: 798

Little Llangothlin Lagoon
- Location within New South Wales Location within Australia
- Coordinates: 30°05′S 151°47′E
- Type: Freshwater, high altitude lake
- Catchment area: Clarence River
- Basin countries: Australia
- Max. length: 1.38 km (0.86 mi)
- Max. width: 1.17 km (0.73 mi)
- Surface area: 1.20 km^{2} (0.46 sq mi)
- Max. depth: 2 m (6 ft 7 in)
- Surface elevation: 1,360 m (4,460 ft)

The Little Llangothlin Nature Reserve is a protected wetland nature reserve that is located on the Northern Tablelands in the New England region of New South Wales, in eastern Australia. The 257-hectare (640-acre) reserve is situated approximately 10 kilometres (6.2 mi) north-east of the rural locality of Llangothlin, and some 20 kilometres (12 mi) north-east of Guyra.

The reserve contains the 120-hectare (300-acre) Little Llangothlin Lagoon, part of the smaller Billy Bung Lagoon, and was established in 1979 under the NSW National Parks and Wildlife Act 1974. In 1996 the reserve was designated a wetland of international importance under the Ramsar Convention. It, with the adjacent area of Bagot Road, is also listed on Australia’s Register of the National Estate.

== Description ==
The Little Llangothlin Nature Reserve has some of the last high-elevation freshwater lagoons on basalt soil on the New England Tableland. The reserve is situated in an area that has lost most of its vegetation to create arable land. It thus serves as a refuge for numerous species of birds, mammals, amphibians and reptiles.

The reserve lies on Tertiary basalt soils on the New England Plateau at an elevation of 1,360 metres (4,460 ft) above sea level, and is surrounded by pastoral farmland. It protects a still largely natural example of a high-elevation lake, most of which have been cleared or severely modified in the region. The lagoon fills a natural depression in the tableland landscape; a former agricultural drainage ditch has been filled in to restore its original water depth of about 2 metres (6 ft 7 in) when full. The vegetation includes sedgeland, herbland and grassy woodland. Trees include New England peppermints, snowgums and silver wattles. The rare Hairy Anchor Plant and Austral Toadflax are found there. The wetlands of the reserve form a drought refuge for many kinds of waterbirds as well as supporting several species of frogs and reptiles. A 4.8-kilometre (3.0 mi) walking track encircles the lagoon.

== See also ==
- Protected areas of New South Wales
