= Dalmorton =

- Town
- Interactive map of Dalmorton
- Coordinates: 29°51′52.16″S 152°27′24.12″E
- Country: Australia
- State: New South Wales
- LGA: Clarence Valley
- Location: 66 km (41 mi) from Grafton

Government
  - State electorate: Clarence
  - Federal division: Page
- Elevation: 213 m (699 ft)

Population
  - Total: 6 (SAL 2021)
- Postcode: 2460
- County: Gresham

Dalmorton is a locality in the Northern Rivers region of New South Wales, Australia. There once was a village of the same name, which was associated with gold mining. Much of the area of the locality is now reserved as National Parks or State Forests. At the 2021 census, the population of Dalmorton was six.

== Location ==
Dalmorton lies on both sides of the Boyd River and the Old Glen Innes Road. The old village site lies on the left bank of the Boyd River, around the junction of Chaelundi Road and Old Glenn Innes Road, close to where Chaelundi Road crosses the Boyd River.

The area now known as Dalmorton lies on the traditional lands of Baanbay people, a group of Gumbainggir.

== History ==
=== Mining ===
Gold was found in the valley of the Boyd River (then also known as the Little River), around the future site of Dalmorton in 1871. The gold was found in quartz reefs and reef mining dominated the field. Initially, several gold reefs were worked, providing work for 600 men. By 1877 there was only one rich gold reef—twelve inches thick and with gold visible in the quartz—being worked at Dalmorton and the number of men working had fallen to around 20. However, gold mining continued in the wider area around the village well into the 1890s and on a smaller scale after that. The last mine in the area closed in 1942. There were over one hundred mines—mainly gold but also silver—in the area around Dalmorton. There was exploration for gold in the Dalmorton area as late as 1984.

=== Mining village ===
A site for the Village of Dalmorton was declared in February 1874, although there was already a settlement there by then. The origin of the name Dalmorton is uncertain, but probably it is taken from the name a nearby quartz reef mining lease. Its earlier unofficial names were 'Dalmorton Reefs' or just 'Dalmorton', and it was said to be known locally as 'The Reef'.

At the peak of early gold mining in the early 1870s, had at least seven public houses. A post office, using the name Dalmorton, opened in 1872. By 1877, Dalmorton had only one street, one hotel (Rudd's), three stores, and many empty houses, without a church or school. Dependent upon mining activity, the village seems to have had revived somewhat in the early 1890s but was in decline again by 1895.

In 1891, the population of Dalmorton was around 200. In 1894, there were three Aboriginal people counted as living at Dalmorton, and in 1906 there were eight.

In 1912, the licence of the last of the village's hotels, Dalmorton Hotel, was sold and applied to a new hotel at South Grafton. In 1918, Dalmorton was described as "a few scattered dwellings, occupied for the most part by tenacious fossickers, who will not give up the search for, the elusive streak". The few remaining inhabitants were badly affected by the Spanish influenza pandemic in 1919.

The village had a school from 1879 to 1914 and again from 1926 to 1931. There was a police station at Dalmorton, by 1881, and the village was also the site of a Police Court.

=== Post-mining decline ===
Without gold mining and with limited agricultural potential, the village came to depend for a time on timber milling. Hoop pine grew in the valley. There were sawmills near Dalmorton. One sawmill was badly damaged by bushfire in 1936, but Dalmorton continued as a timber village well into the 1940s.

At the 1921 census, the population of Dalmorton was around 22 people.

The building that housed the village's combined general store and post office was destroyed by fire, on 4 January 1950, after which a small telephone exchange was temporarily reinstated at a nearby dairy. The store and post office were in business again, in November 1953, when a 78-year old prospector died at Dalmorton, while still seeking gold. The police presence at Dalmorton lasted, until at least around 1954. A newer road from Grafton to Glen Innes became the main highway, and, as it bypassed Dalmorton, the police station was no longer needed. The newer road—now part of the Gwydir Highway—also reduced the amount of traffic passing through the village. The post office closed on 23 December 1966.

== Present day ==
All that remains of the village of Dalmorton today are the remains of a few buildings and the village's cemetery. In the surrounding hills, there are the mineshafts of old gold mines. Slightly upstream of the old village site, on the right bank of the river is the Dalmorton Campground. On the Old Glen Innes Road, a few kilometres to the west of the old village site, there is a short road tunnel, known as the Dalmorton Tunnel, which was hewn from solid rock and dates from the 1860s.
