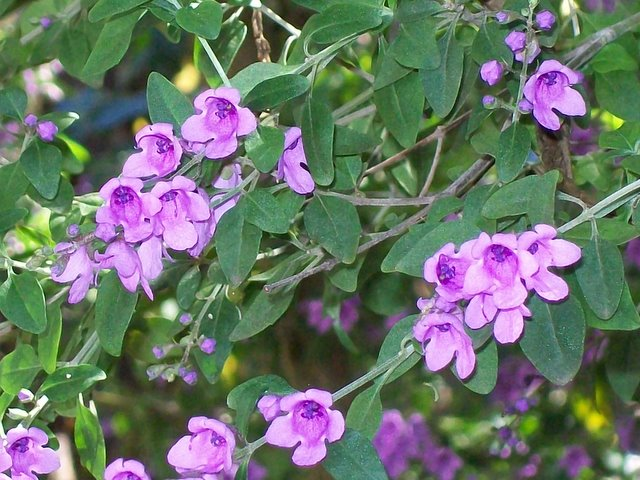
- Prostanthera ovalifolia at Eastwood, New South Wales

Scientific classification
- Kingdom: Plantae
- Clade: Tracheophytes
- Clade: Angiosperms
- Clade: Eudicots
- Clade: Asterids
- Order: Lamiales
- Family: Lamiaceae
- Genus: Prostanthera
- Species: P. ovalifolia

Binomial name
- Prostanthera ovalifolia R.Br.
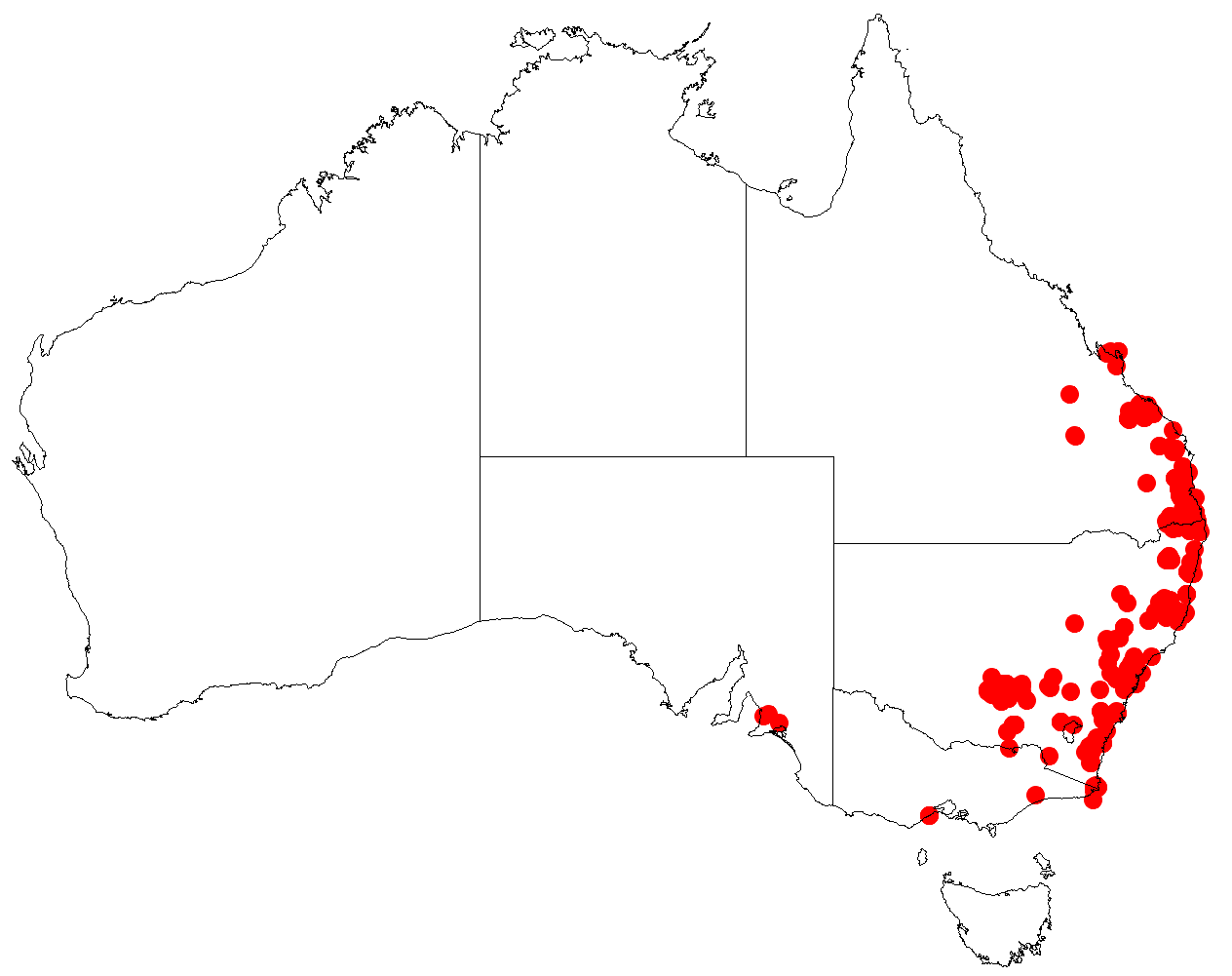
- Occurrence data from AVH

Synonyms
- Prostanthera ovalifolia R.Br. var. ovalifolia; Prostanthera incisa auct. non Benth. in Stanley, T.D. & Ross, E.M. (1986)

= Prostanthera ovalifolia =

Oval-leaf mintbush

Species of flowering plant

Prostanthera ovalifolia, commonly known as the oval-leaf mintbush or purple mintbush, is a species of flowering plant in the family Lamiaceae and is endemic to south-eastern continental Australia. It is an erect shrub with egg-shaped leaves and groups of mauve to deep blue-purple flowers arranged in groups at the ends of branchlets.

== Description ==
Prostanthera ovalifolia is an erect, spreading to dense shrub that typically grows to a height of 1–4 m (3 ft 3 in – 13 ft 1 in) with stems that are square in cross-section and are moderately hairy. The leaves are egg-shaped, a lighter shade of green on the lower surface, 5–50 mm (0.20–1.97 in) long and 3–12 mm (0.12–0.47 in) wide on a petiole 1–6 mm (0.039–0.236 in) long. The flowers are arranged in groups at the ends of the branchlets with bracteoles 1–2 mm (0.039–0.079 in) long and 0.2–0.3 mm (0.0079–0.0118 in) at the base, but that fall off as the flowers develop. The sepals are 2–3.5 mm (0.079–0.138 in) long and form a tube 1–2.5 mm (0.039–0.098 in) long with two lobes, the lower lobe 0.5–1.5 mm (0.020–0.059 in) long. The petals are mauve to deep blue-purple and fused to form a tube 6–18 mm (0.24–0.71 in) long. Flowering occurs from August to November.

== Taxonomy ==
Prostanthera ovalifolia was first formally described in 1810 by Robert Brown in his book Prodromus Florae Novae Hollandiae et Insulae Van Diemen.

== Distribution and habitat ==
Oval-leaf mintbush is widespread in forest growing on sandstone in south-eastern Queensland and eastern New South Wales. It is also sporadically naturalised in the eastern half of Victoria.

== Use in horticulture ==
This mintbush is widely cultivated as a garden shrub where it typically grows to a height of about 2.5 m (8 ft 2 in). It grows best in a well-drained soil with some protection from direct summer sun. It should be pruned back by about one third to retain its bushy shape.
