= Chaelundi National Park =

National park in Australia

- IUCN category II (national park)
- Location within New South Wales
- Location: New South Wales
- Nearest city: Dorrigo
- Coordinates: 29°56′39″S 152°30′39″E
- Area: 191.74 km^{2} (74.03 sq mi)
- Established: 1997
- Governing body: NSW National Parks & Wildlife Service
- Website: http://www.environment.nsw.gov.au/nationalparks/parkHome.aspx?id=N0104

Chaelundi National Park, a national park comprising 19,174 hectares (47,380 acres), is located in the Northern Tablelands district of New South Wales, Australia.

== Features ==
Chaelundi National Park is north-west of Dorrigo and Grafton, approximately 600 kilometres (370 mi) by road north of Sydney.

Comprising 7,500 hectares (19,000 acres) of old-growth forest and 11,000 hectares (27,000 acres) of declared wilderness, the park creates a habitat for 187 (indigenous and non-indigenous) species according to the Atlas of NSW Wildlife.

The park was proclaimed in January 1997, on land formerly designated as a state-owned production forest.

=== Litigation ===
A series of cases were brought in the NSW Land and Environment Court between 1989 and 1991 by members of the North East Forest Alliance to protect the forest located near Dorrigo from continued logging. One key case concerned the interpretation of s.99 of the National Parks and Wildlife Act, 1974, which stated that it was an offence to "take or kill any endangered fauna". Such were the habitat values of the forest that in Corkill v Forestry Commission, Justice Paul Stein referred to the old growth forest as a "veritable forest dependent zoo". The ruling was that "take" included indirect taking by means of the habitat modification/destruction associated with logging:Corkill v Forestry Commission of New South Wales (1991) 73 LGRA 126. That decision went on appeal to the Court of Appeal, and the interpretation was upheld: Forestry Commission v Corkill (1991) 73 LGRA 247.

These legal cases were combined with an on-site blockade of logging work, the blockade being undertaken by experienced and inexperienced green activists and locals many of whom camped in the forest; using techniques such as chaining protesters inside concrete pipes and up six-metre-high (20 ft) tripods.

== See also ==
- Protected areas of New South Wales
- Guy Fawkes River National Park
- Boyd River
- Guy Fawkes River
- Sara River
- High Conservation Value Old Growth forest
