= Rainforest Way =

Series of scenic routes in Australia

The Rainforest Way is a circular series of tourist drives that extends through South East Queensland, Australia across the border into the Northern Rivers region of New South Wales.

It follows roughly the caldera of the extinct Tweed Volcano in the north east corner of NSW, whose volcanic plug is Mount Warning. The area contains many National Parks, of which several are classified as World Heritage Sites. The drive features Gondwana Rainforests.

Major towns travelled through as part of the Rainforest Way include:

- Gold Coast
- Beaudesert
- Tweed Heads
- Byron Bay
- Lismore
- Ballina
- Casino
- Kyogle
- Murwillumbah

Smaller towns travelled through as part of the Rainforest Way include:

- Ocean Shores
- Brunswick Heads
- Mullumbimby
- Uki
- Bangalow
- Bogangar
- Nimbin
- Suffolk Park
- Lennox Head
- Alstonville
- Woodenbong
- Bonalbo
- Urbenville
- Burringbar
