= Mann River Nature Reserve =

Protected area in New South Wales, Australia

- IUCN category II (national park)
- Location within New South Wales
- Location: New South Wales
- Nearest city: Glen Innes
- Coordinates: 29°43′S 152°04′E
- Area: 71.28 km^{2} (27.52 sq mi)
- Established: 7 July 1985
- Governing body: NSW National Parks and Wildlife Service
- Website: Official website

The Mann River Nature Reserve is a protected nature reserve that is located on the eastern edge of the Great Dividing Range on the Northern Tablelands in the New England region of New South Wales, in eastern Australia. The 7,128-hectare (17,610-acre) reserve is situated approximately 57 kilometres (35 mi) east of the town of Glen Innes, some 145 kilometres (90 mi) west of Grafton, and approximately 155 kilometres (96 mi) north-east of Armidale. The reserve is located to the south of the Gwydir Highway on the Old Grafton Road. The Mann River bisects the reserve.

== History ==
After an interest to protect the area, on 7 July 1985 an area of 7,128 hectares (17,610 acres) was gazetted as the Mann River Nature Reserve. The reserve is currently managed by NSW National Parks and Wildlife Service. The reserve is set nearby the old Grafton road, which in its day was the major route between Glen Innes and Grafton. The road was first built after an interest of logging for red cedar became predominant in the 1840s.

== Geography ==
As the Mann River Nature Reserve is a part of the Great Dividing Range, the terrain itself is quite mountainous. There are a few creeks and rivers which traverse the nature reserve itself, the most major being the Mann River. The vegetation in the nature reserve is forests with native trees of Australia dotting the landscape. As the vegetation is forest, bushfires can start in the warm summer months, especially after a period of little rain. The nature reserve is home to many different varieties of Australian wildlife, including kangaroos, quolls and wallabies. The highest point in the nature reserve is Tommys Rock Lookout, which is set at an elevation of 1,015 metres (3,330 ft) above sea level.

== Tourism ==
The reserve is a more unknown area to tourists when comparing it to other national parks, although there are camping facilities available. There are walking tracks to for visitors to view the park itself.

== See also ==
- Protected areas of New South Wales
- High Conservation Value Old Growth forest
