= Sherwood Nature Reserve =

Protected area in New South Wales, Australia

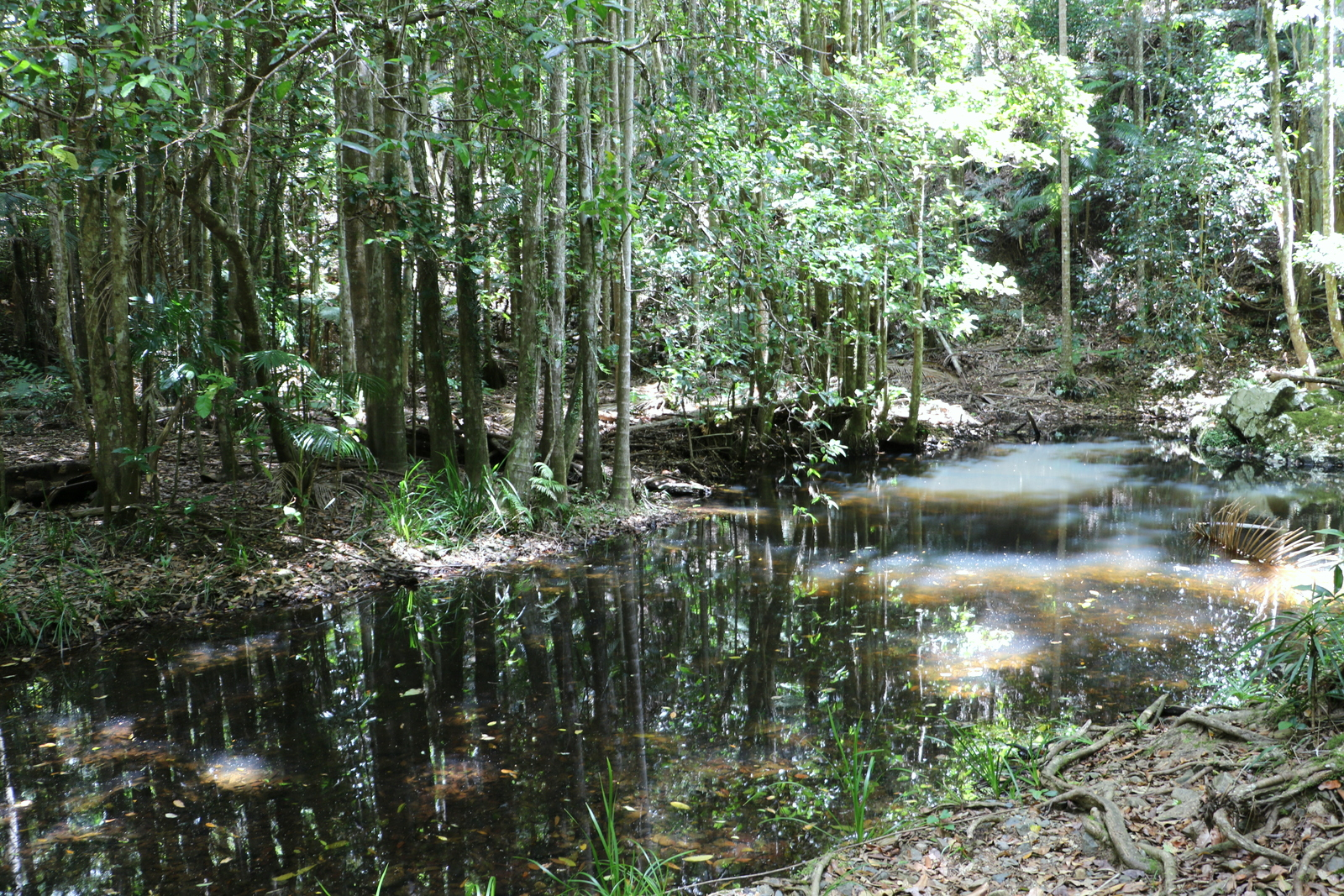
- Woolgoolga Creek

- Location within New South Wales
- Location: New South Wales
- Nearest city: Woolgoolga
- Coordinates: 30°7′17″S 153°8′32″E
- Area: 5,904 ha (22.80 sq mi)
- Governing body: NSW National Parks & Wildlife Service
- Website: Official website

Sherwood Nature Reserve is a protected nature reserve located near Woolgoolga in the north coast region of New South Wales, Australia.

92 tree species have been recorded in the sub tropical rainforest at Woolgoolga Creek. Significant tree species include blue quandong, white booyong, hoop pine, blush bloodwood, strangler fig, red carabeen, bangalow palm, sugarbark, grey myrtle, coachwood and maiden's blush.

The rainforest at Woolgoolga Creek is a known habitat of the rare mottled tree snail. 50 species of native animals have also found refuge, such as: brush-tailed rock wallaby, powerful owl, leaf-tailed gecko, giant barred and long-nosed potoroo.

The reserve incorporates the former Woolgoolga Creek Flora Reserve, originally dedicated in 1917 as part of Wedding Bells State Forest and subsequently gazetted as a flora reserve in 1971. The area was intensively logged during the early 1900s when a tramway to Woolgoolga was in operation. Rainforest logging ceased in 1917 and hardwood logging ceased in the 1940s. The eastern end of the reserve includes areas cleared for hardwood plantation during the 1960s. Flooded gum was the most common species planted with some trial planting of bunya pine. This section of reserve also previously had several banana plantations, which were established in the early 1900s. The banana plantations were in operation until the late 1960s, when they were replaced with hardwood plantations.

== See also ==
- Protected areas of New South Wales
- High Conservation Value Old Growth forest
