= Mann River (New South Wales) =

River in New South Wales, Australia

Coordinates: 29°39′54″S 152°09′04″E

Mann River Mitchell River, Ben Lomond Creek, Backwater River
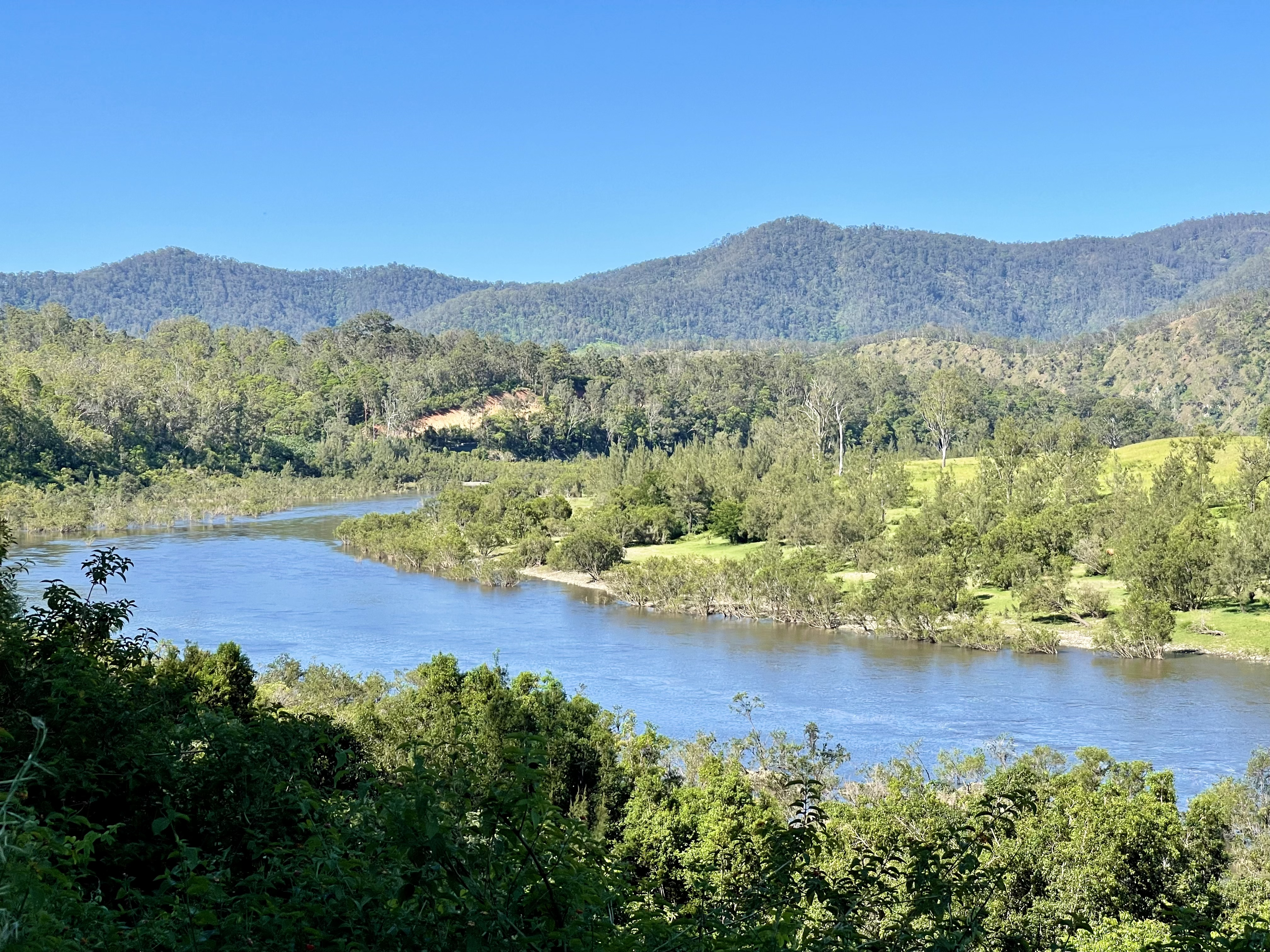
- Mann River, Gibraltar Range National Park, New South Wales
- Etymology: In honour of Samuel Mann

Location
- Country: Australia
- State: New South Wales
- Region: NSW North Coast (IBRA), Northern Rivers
- Municipalities: Clarence Valley, Glen Innes Severn

Physical characteristics
- Source: Great Dividing Range
  - location: Llangothlin Lake, near Ben Lomond
  - elevation: 1,410 m (4,630 ft)
- Mouth: confluence with the Clarence River
  - location: southwest of Baryulgil
  - elevation: 44 m (144 ft)
- Length: 238 km (148 mi)

Basin features
- River system: Clarence River catchment
- Tributaries
  - right: Nymboida River, Henry River, Yarrow River
- National park: Nymboida National Park

Mann River, a perennial stream of the Clarence River catchment, is located in the Northern Rivers district of New South Wales, Australia.

== Course and features ==
Mann River rises at Llangothlin Lake, on the slopes of the Great Dividing Range, near Ben Lomond and flows generally north north east, east, north east and north, joined by four tributaries including the Nymboida River, Henry River and Yarrow River, before reaching its confluence with the Clarence River, southwest of Baryulgil. The river descends 1,370 metres (4,490 ft) over its 238 kilometres (148 mi) course; and flows through the Mann River Nature Reserve.

The river is believed to be named in honour of Samuel Furneaux Mann, who held a squatting licence for a short time in the region northwest of Glen Innes or for Gother Kerr Mann, a prominent settler in the area. Another name for the river, rarely used now, is Mitchell River, probably named after Thomas Mitchell.

== See also ==
- Rivers of New South Wales
