= Llangothlin, New South Wales =

Llangothlin New South Wales
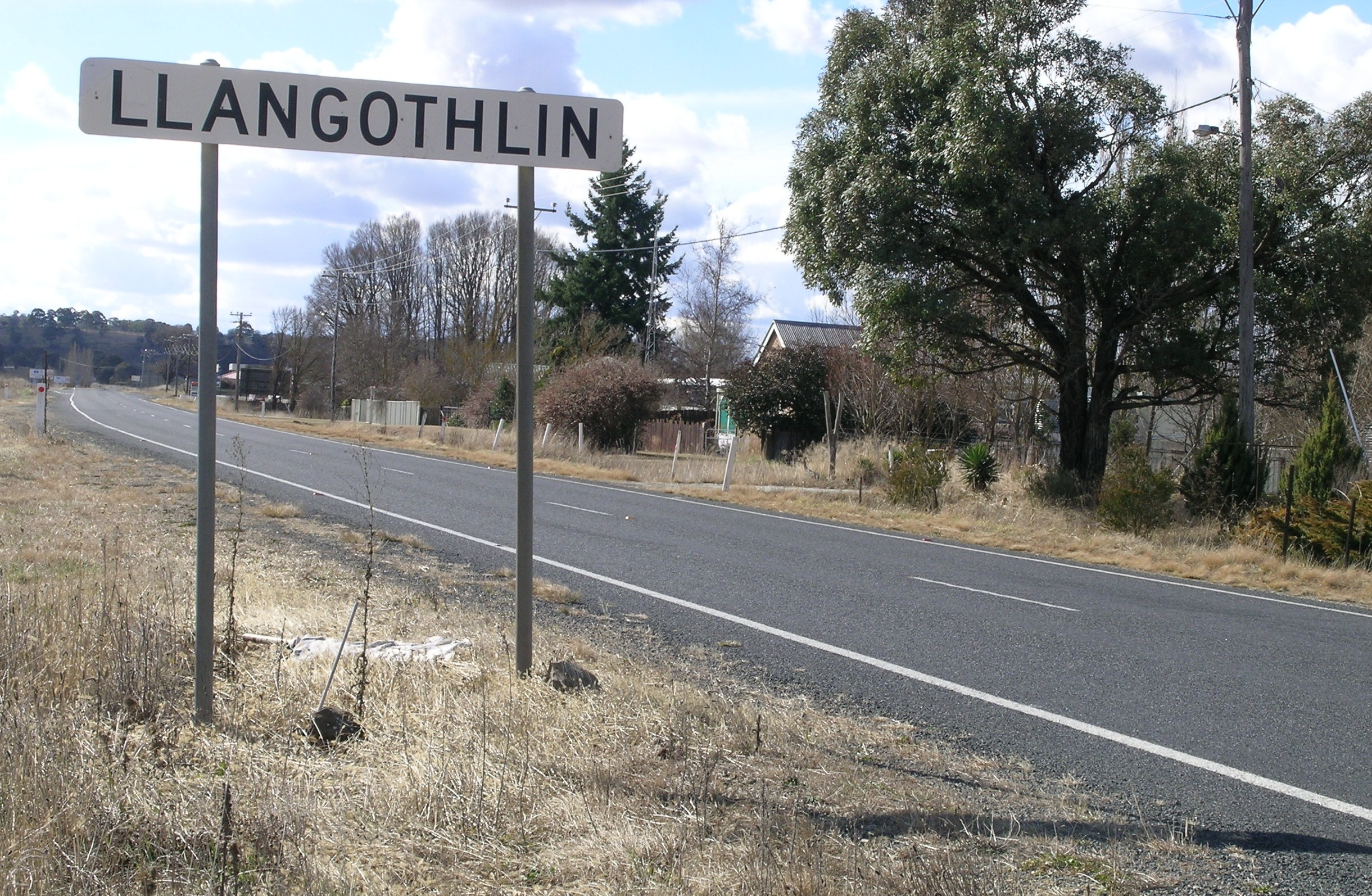
- New England Highway at Llangothlin

- Coordinates: 30°08′S 151°41′E
- Population: 104 (SAL 2021)
- Postcode(s): 2365
- Elevation: 1,289 m (4,229 ft)
- Location: 555 km (345 mi) N of Sydney; 49 km (30 mi) N of Armidale; 49 km (30 mi) S of Glen Innes; 11 km (7 mi) N of Guyra
- LGA(s): Armidale Regional Council
- County: Clarke
- State electorate(s): Northern Tablelands
- Federal division(s): New England

Llangothlin is a rural locality with several houses, 11 kilometres (7 mi) north of Guyra on the Northern Tablelands in the New England region of New South Wales, Australia. Llangothlin was located in the Guyra Shire local government area until that council was amalgamated into the Armidale Regional Council on 12 May 2016.

In 1848 William Rawson was lessee of the 50,000-acre (200 km^{2}) Llangothlin run. Llangothlin was named after its Welsh counterpart (spelt Llangollen) in Denbighshire.

The original alignment of the New England Highway crossed the Main North railway line at Llangothlin at a level crossing, until the highway was realigned to be entirely on the eastern side of the railway. There was originally a railway station at Llangothlin, which opened in 1884 and closed about 1974. The line is now closed. The old church is now a crafts shop. Llangothlin Post Office opened on 15 November 1886 and it still services the local community today.

About 11 km northeast of Llangothlin is the Little Llangothlin Nature Reserve at an elevation of 1360 metres. It is the only protected area on the New England Tablelands on basaltic soils. This Reserve contains the 120 hectare Little Llangothlin Lagoon and part of the much smaller Billy Bung Lagoon. Little Llangothlin Nature Reserve and the adjacent area, Bagot Rd, have been placed on the Register of the National Estate. These are two small lakes which are an important breeding and feeding area for migratory waterfowl, and also for frogs.

== See also ==
- Aberfoyle River
