= Star lily =

Star lily or starlily is a common name for several plants and may refer to:

- Hypoxis, a plant genus also known as star grass containing such examples as
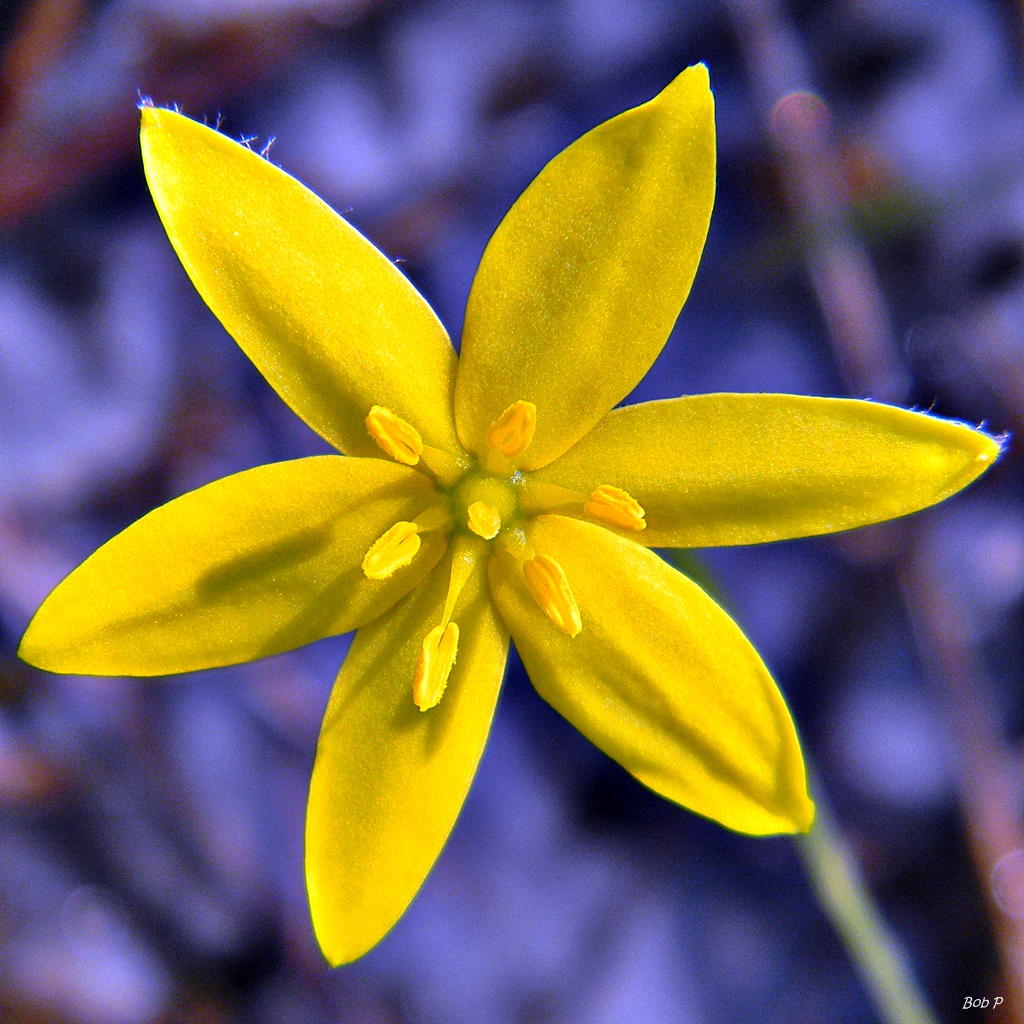
  Hypoxis juncea
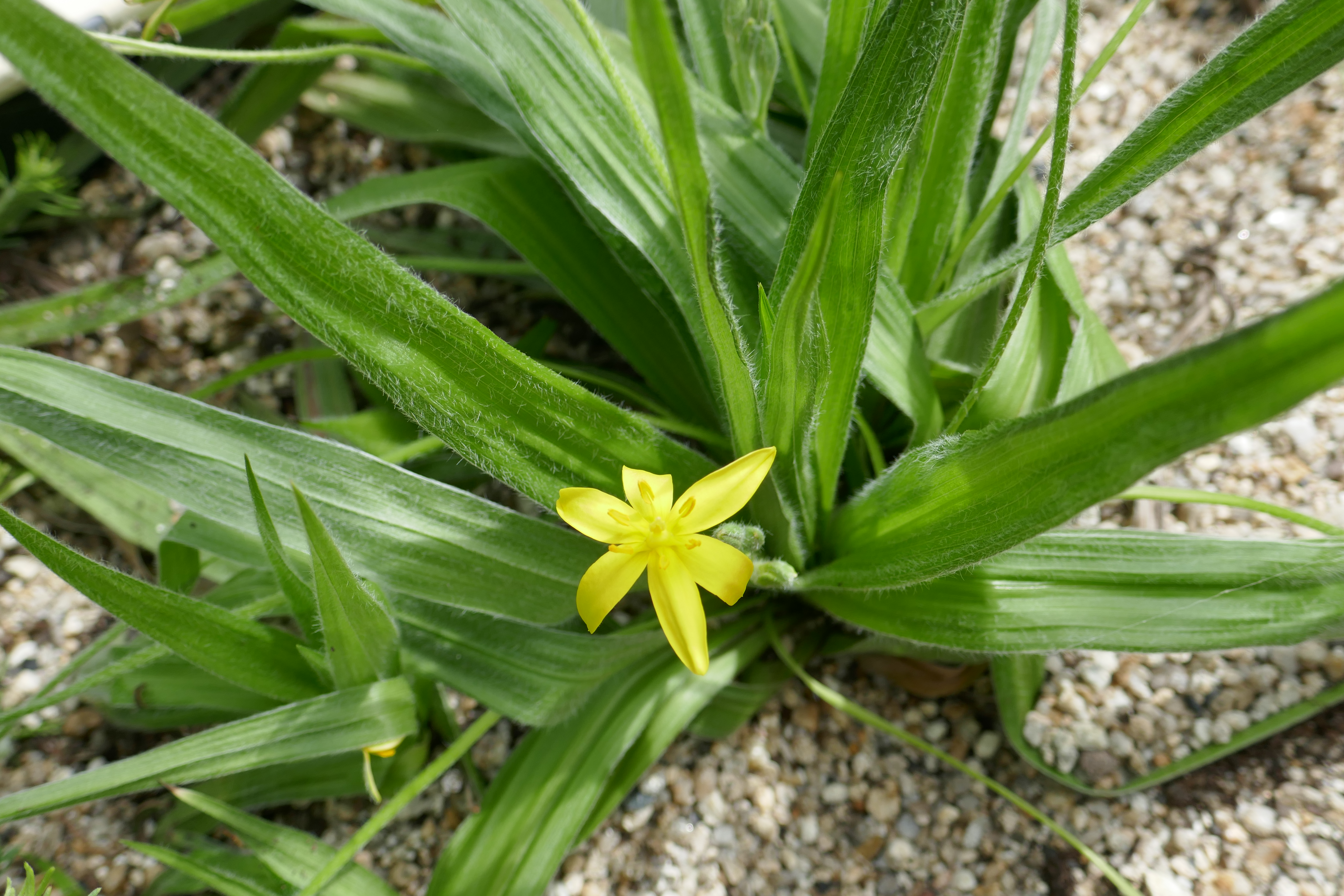
  Hypoxis hemerocallidea
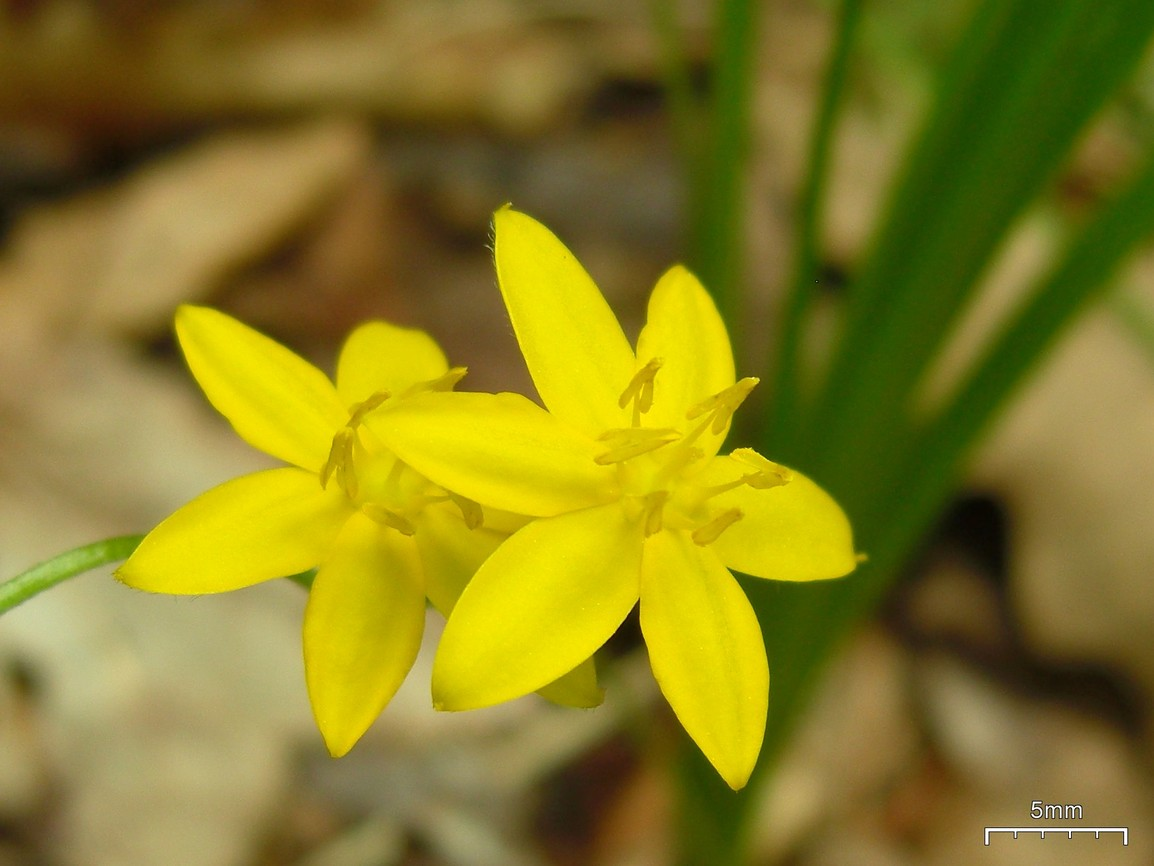
  Hypoxis hirsuta
- Various plant species in the Melanthieae, also known as "deathcamas" including
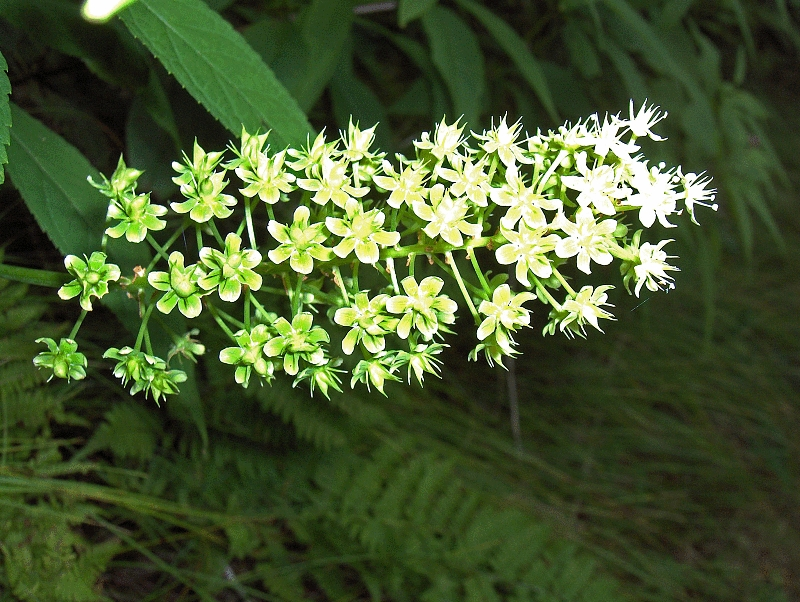
  Amianthium muscitoxicum
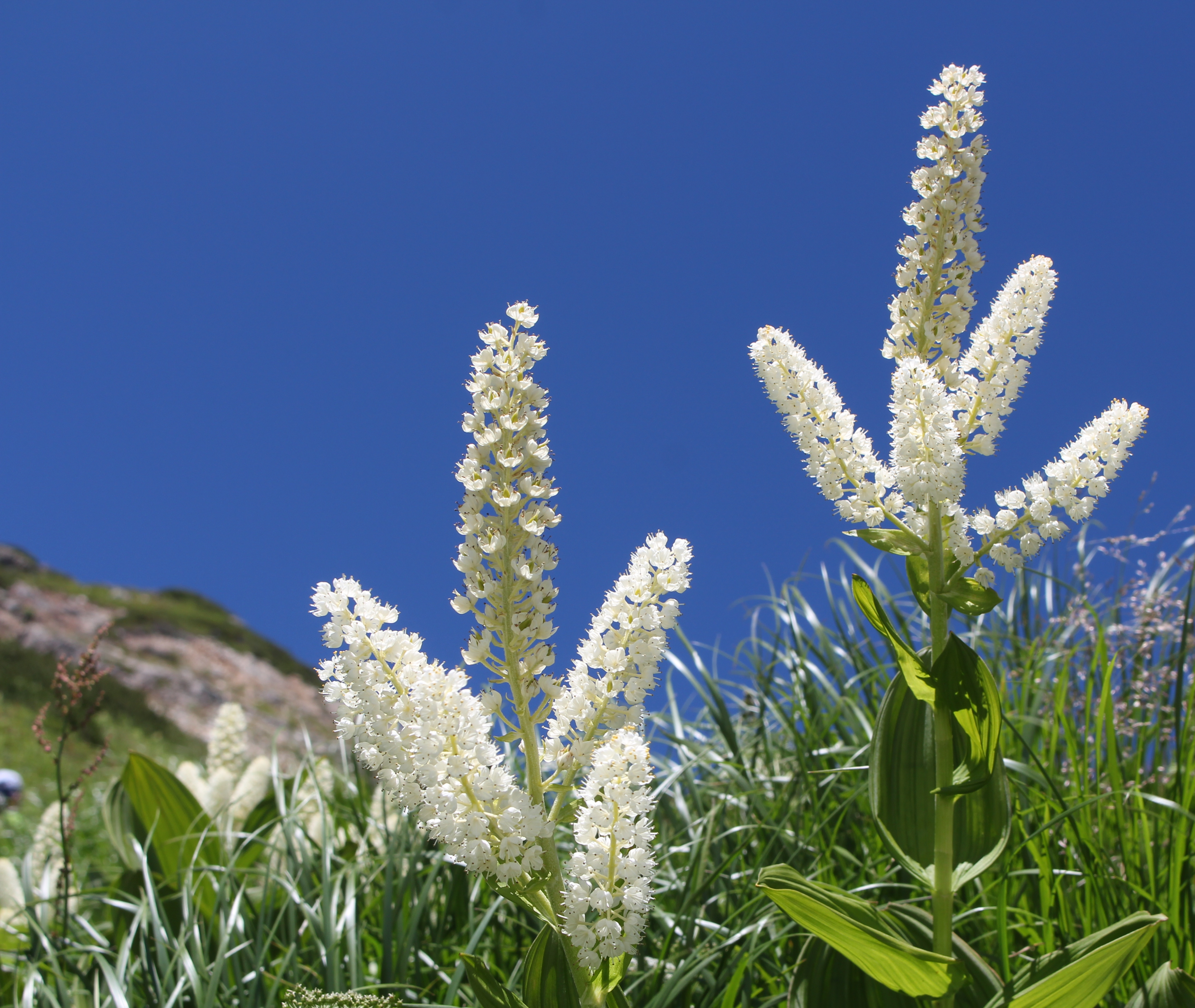
  Veratrum stamineum
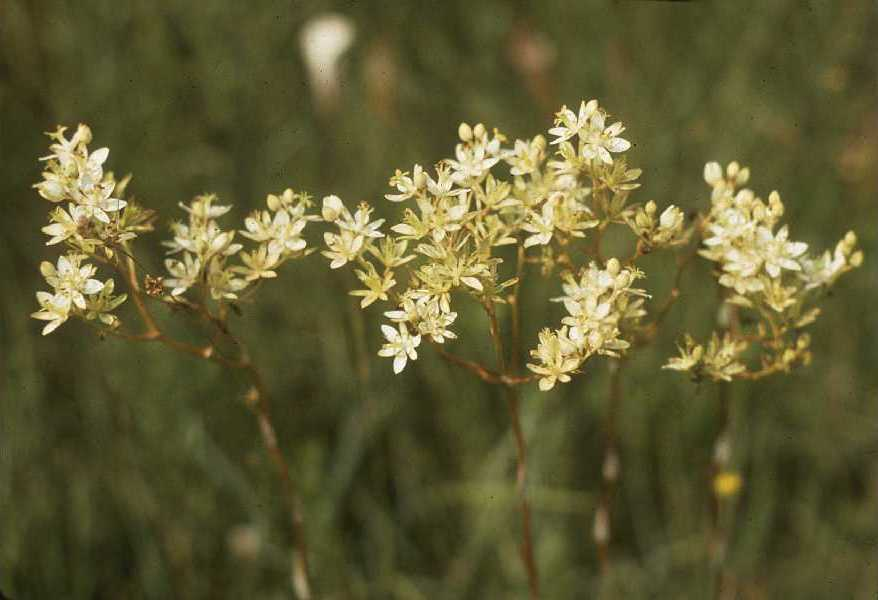
  Zigadenus glaberrimus
- Leucocrinum montanum, a plant species of western North America
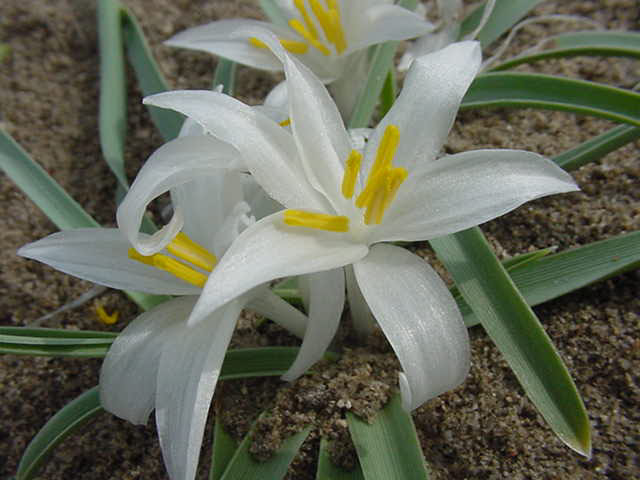
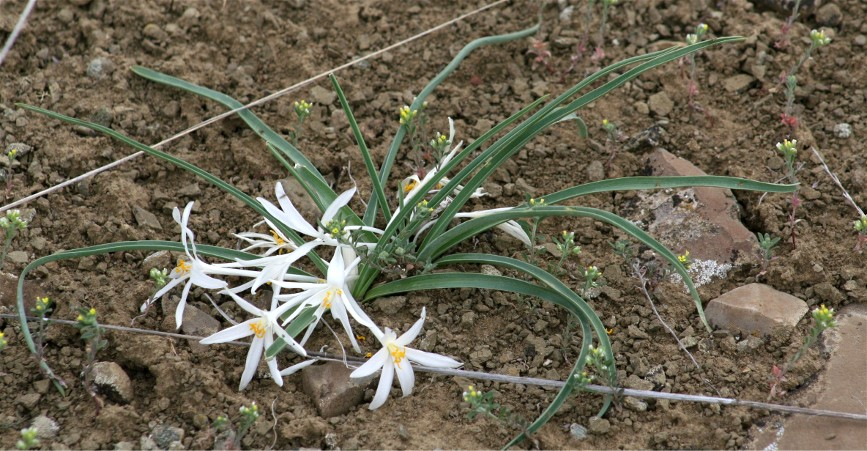
