= H. juncea =

H. juncea may refer to:

- Heliophila juncea, a plant endemic to southern Africa
- Hypoxis juncea, a star-grass with narrow leaves
