= Empodium gloriosum =

Scientific classification
- Kingdom: Plantae
- Clade: Tracheophytes
- Clade: Angiosperms
- Clade: Monocots
- Order: Asparagales
- Family: Hypoxidaceae
- Genus: Empodium
- Species: E. gloriosum

Binomial name
- Empodium gloriosum (Nel) B.L.Burtt

Synonyms
- Forbesia gloriosa Nel

Species of plant

Empodium gloriosum is a perennial flowering plant and tuber-forming geophyte belonging to the genus Empodium. The species is endemic to the Eastern Cape and the Western Cape.
