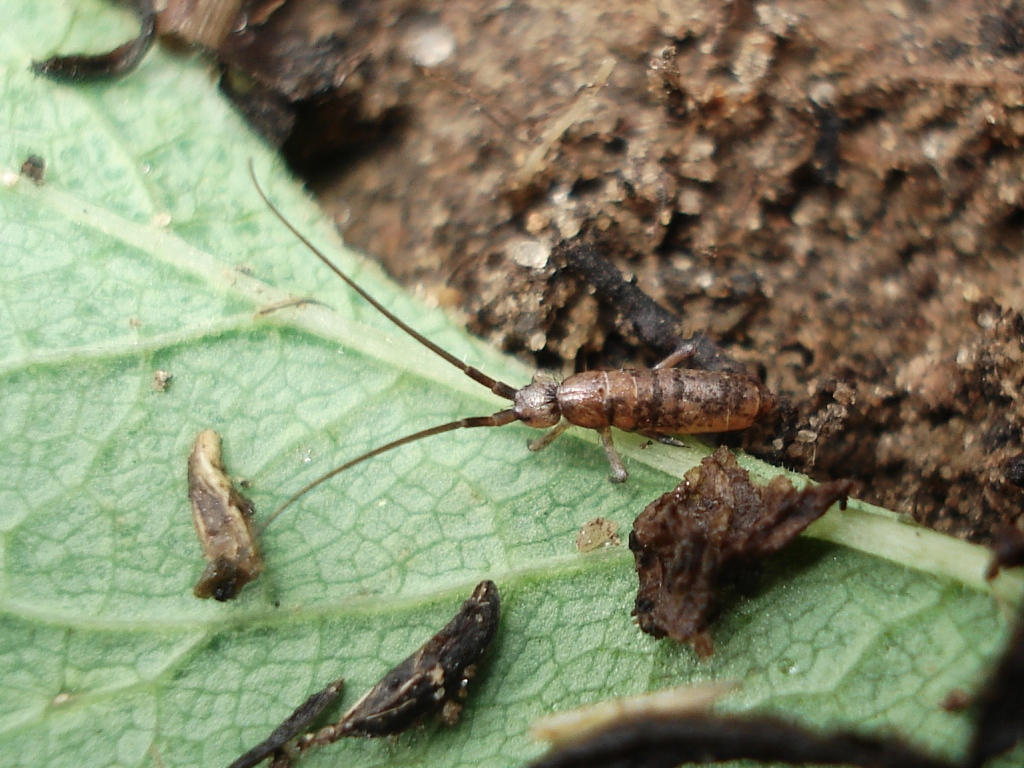

Scientific classification
- Domain: Eukaryota
- Kingdom: Animalia
- Phylum: Arthropoda
- Class: Collembola
- Order: Entomobryomorpha
- Family: Tomoceridae
- Genus: Pogonognathellus
- Species: P. longicornis

Binomial name
- Pogonognathellus longicornis (O.F.Müller, 1776)

= Pogonognathellus longicornis =

Species of springtail

Pogonognathellus longicornis (former names: Tomocerus longicornis or Podura longicornis) is a common species of springtail present in Europe.

It is approximately 9 millimetres (0.35 in) long with long antennae that curl in an unusual spiral shape when touched.

== Description ==
Pogonognathellus longicornis is a very large species of springtail, reaching up to 9 millmeters in length. Its antennae are much longer than the body and break easily. It is identified by the empodium's filament reaching beyond the claw of the foot. It is grey-brown with blue pigment on the femur.

== Distribution ==
Pogonognathellus longicornis is found in Western Europe. It is known from The Netherlands, the United Kingdom and Ireland.
