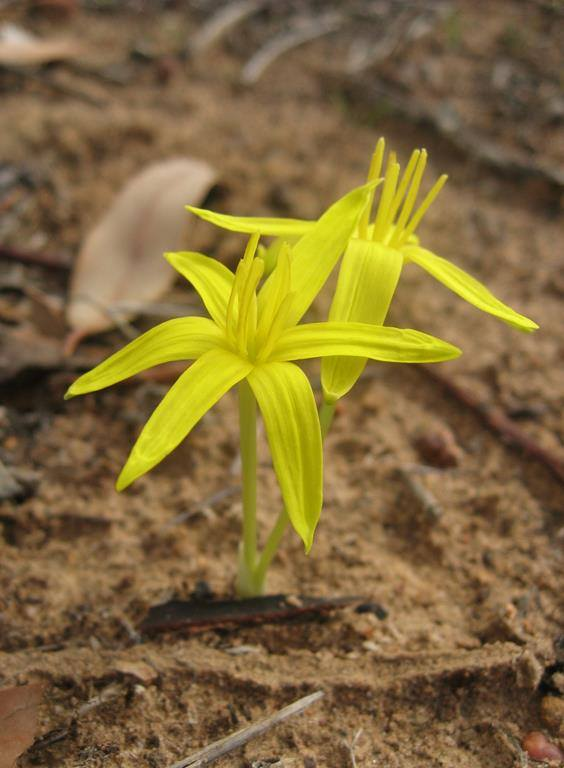

Scientific classification
- Kingdom: Plantae
- Clade: Tracheophytes
- Clade: Angiosperms
- Clade: Monocots
- Order: Asparagales
- Family: Hypoxidaceae
- Genus: Empodium
- Species: E. namaquensis

Binomial name
- Empodium namaquensis (Baker) M.F.Thomps.

Synonyms
- Forbesia namaquensis (Baker) Nel

= Empodium namaquensis =

Species of plant

Empodium namaquensis (often referred to as Empodium namaquense), commonly known as the Namakwasterretjie, is a perennial flowering plant and tuber-forming geophyte belonging to the genus Empodium. The species is endemic to the Northern Cape.
