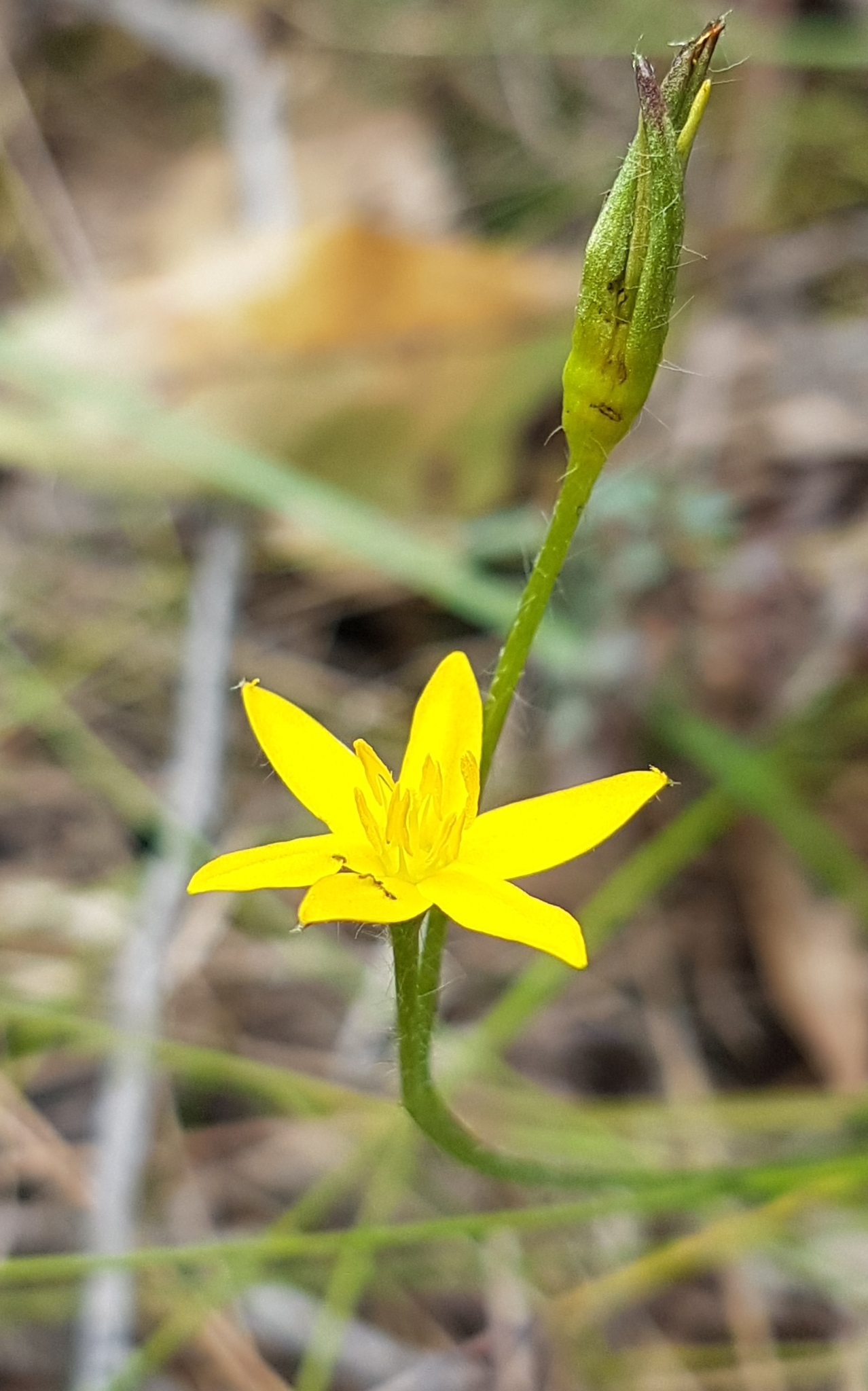
- Growing in Congo, New South Wales

Scientific classification
- Kingdom: Plantae
- Clade: Tracheophytes
- Clade: Angiosperms
- Clade: Monocots
- Order: Asparagales
- Family: Hypoxidaceae
- Genus: Hypoxis
- Species: H. hygrometrica

Binomial name
- Hypoxis hygrometrica Labill.

= Hypoxis hygrometrica =

Species of plant

Hypoxis hygrometrica, known as the golden weather-grass, is a small herbaceous plant. It is found in south eastern Australia.
