= Empodium veratrifolium =

Scientific classification
- Kingdom: Plantae
- Clade: Tracheophytes
- Clade: Angiosperms
- Clade: Monocots
- Order: Asparagales
- Family: Hypoxidaceae
- Genus: Empodium
- Species: E. veratrifolium

Binomial name
- Empodium veratrifolium (Willd.) M.F.Thomps.

Synonyms
- Curculigo plicata var. veratrifolia (Willd.) Baker; Curculigo veratrifolia (Willd.) Baker; Forbesia plicata var. veratrifolia (Willd.) Nel; Hypoxis plicata Jacq.; Hypoxis veratrifolia Willd.

Species of plant

Empodium veratrifolium, commonly known as the West Coast star in English or breëblaar sterretjie and Weskus sterretjie in Afrikaans, is a perennial flowering plant and tuber-forming geophyte belonging to the genus Empodium. The species is endemic to the Western Cape. It has a range of less than 500 km^{2} and there are fifteen subpopulations; the plant occurs from Lamberts Bay to Saldanha Bay on the Saldanha strandveld. The plant has lost some of its habitat due to coastal development. Invasive plants are also becoming a threat.
