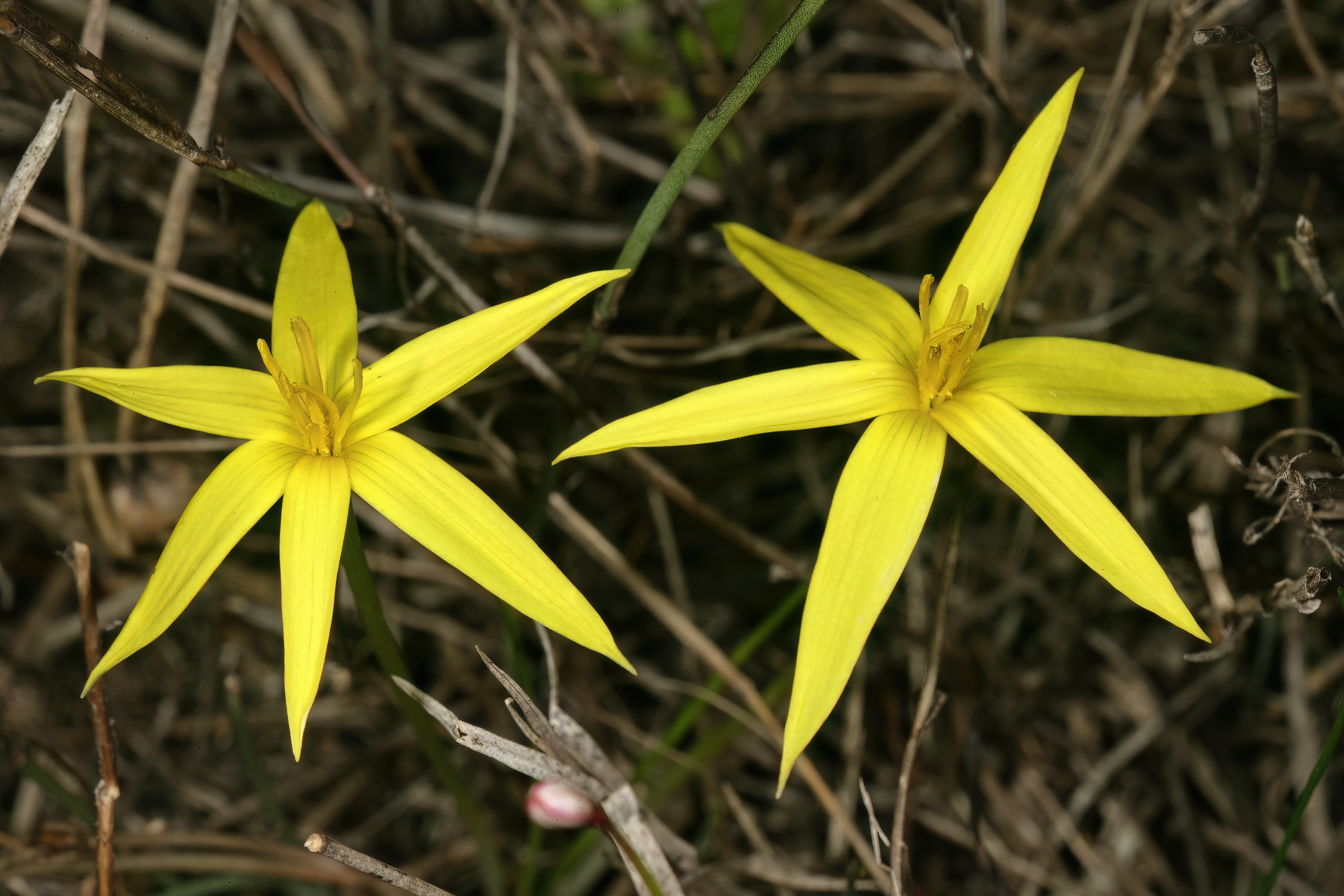

Scientific classification
- Kingdom: Plantae
- Clade: Tracheophytes
- Clade: Angiosperms
- Clade: Monocots
- Order: Asparagales
- Family: Hypoxidaceae
- Genus: Empodium
- Species: E. plicatum

Binomial name
- Empodium plicatum (Thunb.) Garside

Synonyms
- Gethyllis plicata (Thunb.) Jacq.; Curculigo plicata (Thunb.) Dryand. ex W.T.Aiton; Fabricia plicata Thunb.; Forbesia plicata (Thunb.) Nel; Hypoxis plicata (Thunb.) L.f.

= Empodium plicatum =

Species of plant

Empodium plicatum, commonly known as the Autumn star, Autumn golden star or ploegtydblommetjie, is a perennial flowering plant and tuber-forming geophyte belonging to the genus Empodium. The species is endemic to the Northern Cape and the Western Cape.
