= Hypoxis mexicana =

Scientific classification
- Kingdom: Plantae
- Clade: Tracheophytes
- Clade: Angiosperms
- Clade: Monocots
- Order: Asparagales
- Family: Hypoxidaceae
- Genus: Hypoxis
- Species: H. mexicana

Binomial name
- Hypoxis mexicana Schultes & Schultes f. in J. J. Roemer et al

Synonyms
- Hypoxis decumbens var. mexicana (Schult. & Schult. f.) Jenn.

Species of flowering plant

Hypoxis mexicana, common name Mexican yellow star-grass, is a small herbaceous plant. It is widespread across much of Mexico, and has also been reported from southern Arizona.

Hypoxis mexicana grows is open forests and woodlands. It has a tuft of leaves with long bristles near the base. Flowers are yellow, 6-parted, in a panicle at the top of the flowering stalk.
