= Curculigo ensifolia =

Scientific classification
- Kingdom: Plantae
- Clade: Tracheophytes
- Clade: Angiosperms
- Clade: Monocots
- Order: Asparagales
- Family: Hypoxidaceae
- Genus: Curculigo
- Species: C. ensifolia

Binomial name
- Curculigo ensifolia R.Br.

Species of flowering plant

Curculigo ensifolia is a plant species in the Hypoxidaceae, endemic to Australia.

Varieties

- Curculigo ensifolia var. ensifolia – Queensland, New South Wales, Northern Territory, Western Australia
- Curculigo ensifolia var. longifolia Benth. – Northern Territory
