= Empodium flexile =

Scientific classification
- Kingdom: Plantae
- Clade: Tracheophytes
- Clade: Angiosperms
- Clade: Monocots
- Order: Asparagales
- Family: Hypoxidaceae
- Genus: Empodium
- Species: E. flexile

Binomial name
- Empodium flexile (Nel) M.F.Thomps. ex Snijman

Synonyms
- Forbesia flexilis Nel

Species of plant

Empodium flexile is a perennial flowering plant and tuber-forming geophyte belonging to the genus Empodium. The species is endemic to the Northern Cape, Eastern Cape and Western Cape.
