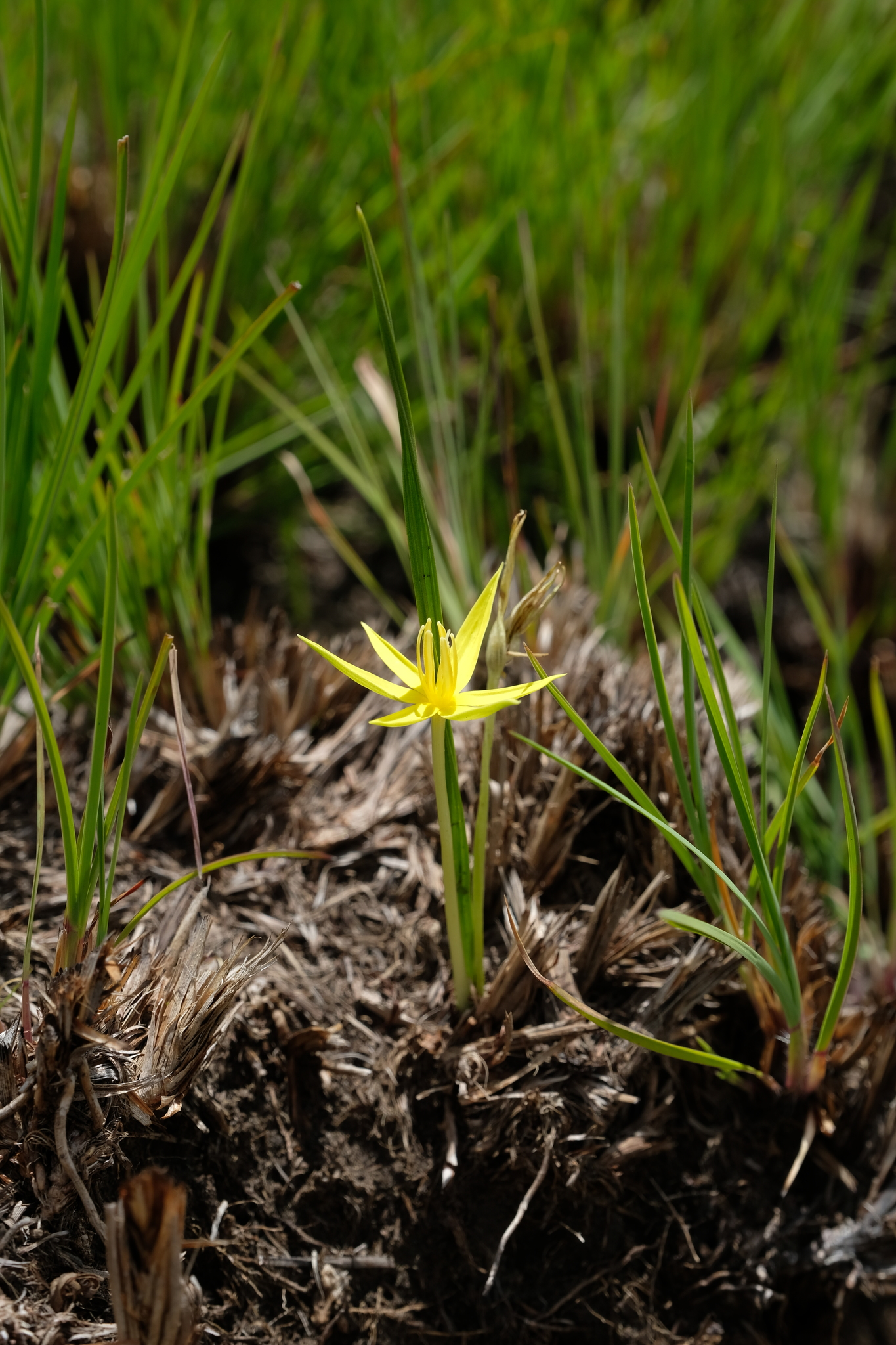

Scientific classification
- Kingdom: Plantae
- Clade: Tracheophytes
- Clade: Angiosperms
- Clade: Monocots
- Order: Asparagales
- Family: Hypoxidaceae
- Genus: Empodium
- Species: E. monophyllum

Binomial name
- Empodium monophyllum (Nel) B.L.Burtt

Synonyms
- Forbesia monophylla Nel

= Empodium monophyllum =

Species of plant

Empodium monophyllum is a perennial flowering plant and tuber-forming geophyte belonging to the genus Empodium. The species is native to KwaZulu-Natal and Eswatini.
