= Dactylispa atkinsonii =

Scientific classification
- Kingdom: Animalia
- Phylum: Arthropoda
- Class: Insecta
- Order: Coleoptera
- Suborder: Polyphaga
- Infraorder: Cucujiformia
- Family: Chrysomelidae
- Genus: Dactylispa
- Species: D. atkinsonii

Binomial name
- Dactylispa atkinsonii (Gestro, 1897)

Synonyms
- Hispa atkinsonii Gestro, 1897; Dactylispa malaisei Uhmann, 1939

Species of beetle

Dactylispa atkinsonii is a species of beetle of the family Chrysomelidae. It is found in Bangladesh, Bhutan, China (Yunnan, Xizang), India (Punjab, Sikkim, Uttar Pradesh, West Bengal), Myanmar and Nepal.

== Life history ==
The recorded host plants for this species are Curculigo species.
