= Curculigo rhizophylla =

Scientific classification
- Kingdom: Plantae
- Clade: Tracheophytes
- Clade: Angiosperms
- Clade: Monocots
- Order: Asparagales
- Family: Hypoxidaceae
- Genus: Curculigo
- Species: C. rhizophylla

Binomial name
- Curculigo rhizophylla (Baker) T.Durand & Schinz

Herbaceous plant species

Curculigo rhizophylla, also known as Hypoxidia rhizophylla, Hypoxis rhizophylla, or Molineria rhizophylla, is a tuberous geophyte plant belonging to the family Hypoxidaceae, and is endemic to the Seychelles, where it occurs from sea level up to 900 m, though mainly above 150 m. Its flowers have six petals; at up to 15 cm (5.9 in) width, they are the largest flowers of any Seychelles native plant. Surprisingly for such a small island group, these flowers are variable in colour, having purple, dark red, orange or yellow flowers, which grow at various altitudes. Finally, the leaf tips, if they come in contact with the soil, will develop a plantlet which can grow as large as the mother plant.
