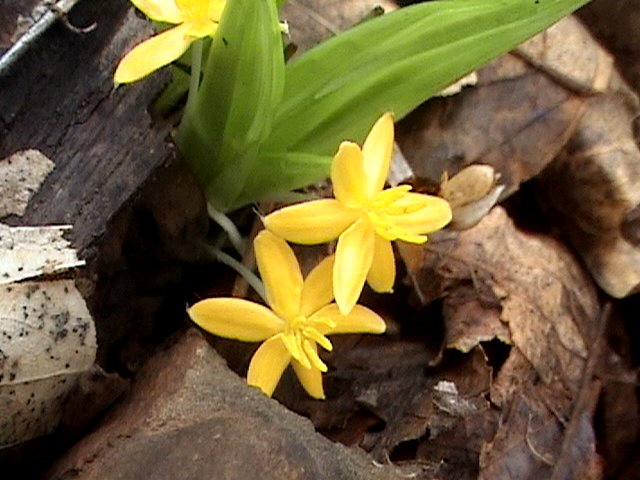
- Curculigo orchioides

Scientific classification
- Kingdom: Plantae
- Clade: Tracheophytes
- Clade: Angiosperms
- Clade: Monocots
- Order: Asparagales
- Family: Hypoxidaceae
- Genus: Curculigo
- Species: C. orchioides

Binomial name
- Curculigo orchioides Gaertn., 1788

= Curculigo orchioides =

Species of flowering plant

Curculigo orchioides (commonly called golden eye-grass, xian mao, weevil-wort, कालो मुस्ली (in Nepal) black musli, Kali musli, or Kali Musali) is a flowering plant species in the genus Curculigo. It is native to Nepal, China, Japan, the Indian subcontinent, Papuasia, and Micronesia. The species has been reported also from islands such as Guam and New Caledonia.

== Names ==
C. orchidoides is known as Nilappana (നിലപ്പന) in Malayalam, Nelatadi (నేలతాడి) in Telugu, Nilapanai (நிலப்பனை) in Tamil; all the three meaning ground-palm, as well as କୁଆକେନ୍ଦା and ତାଳମୂଳୀ in Odiya and তলমূলি in Bengali.

== Chemical compounds ==
From C. orchidoides, several chemical compounds of the curculigoside class including curculigoside A, B, C and D and curculigine A and D have been isolated.

== Gallery ==
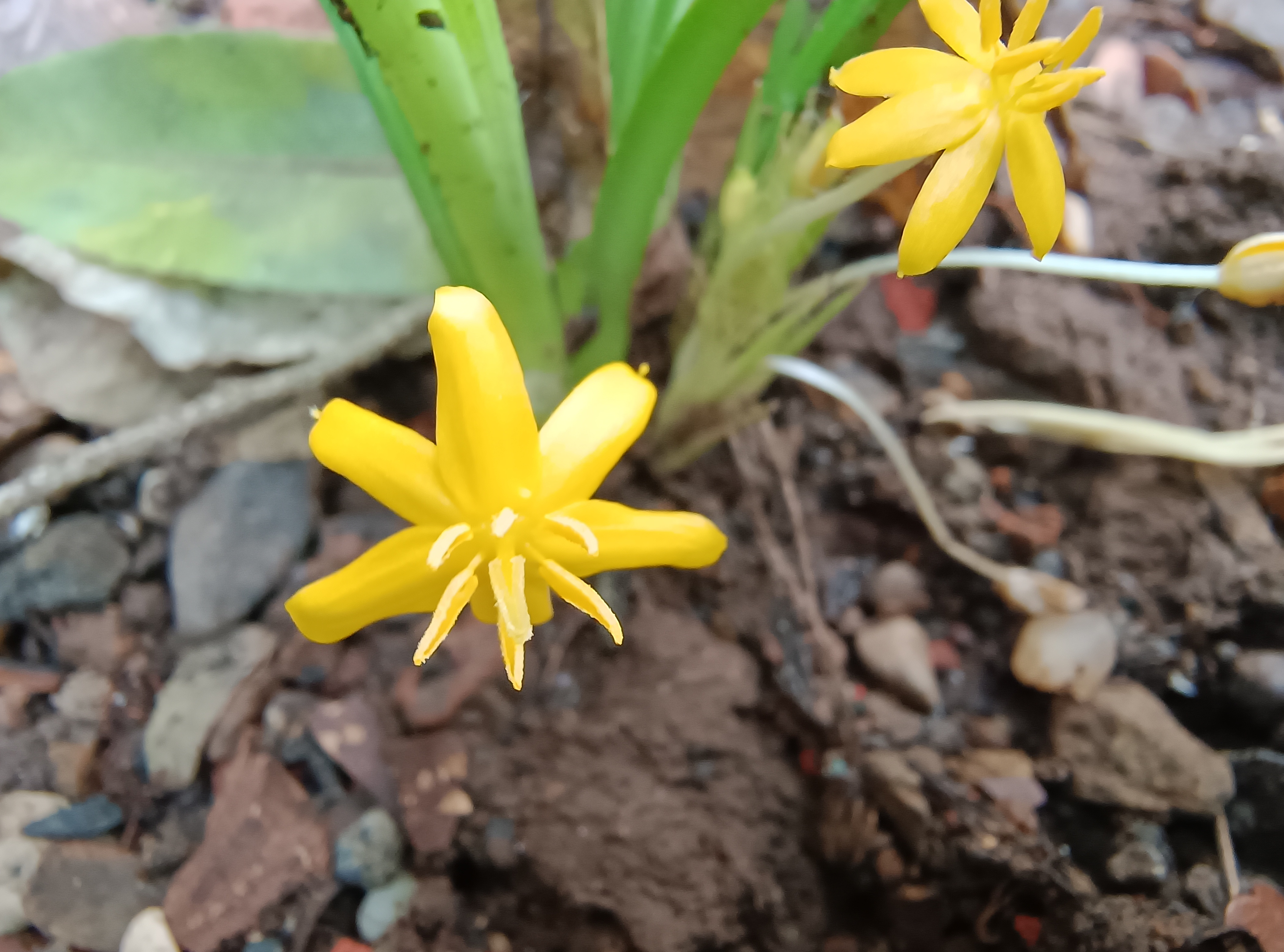
Flower of Curculigo orchioides seen in Mumbai, India

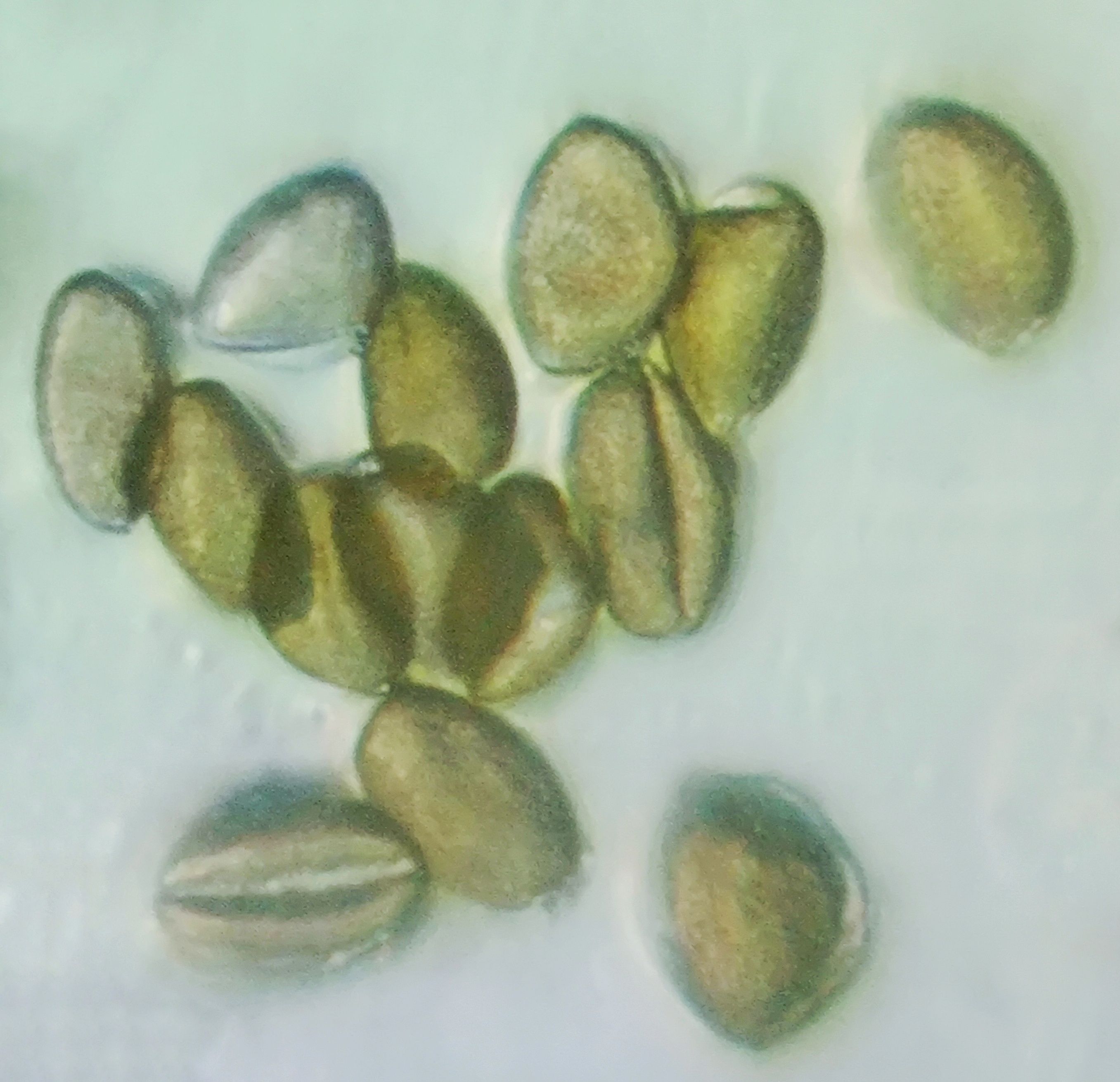
Pollen grains of Curculigo orchioides taken with the Foldscope
