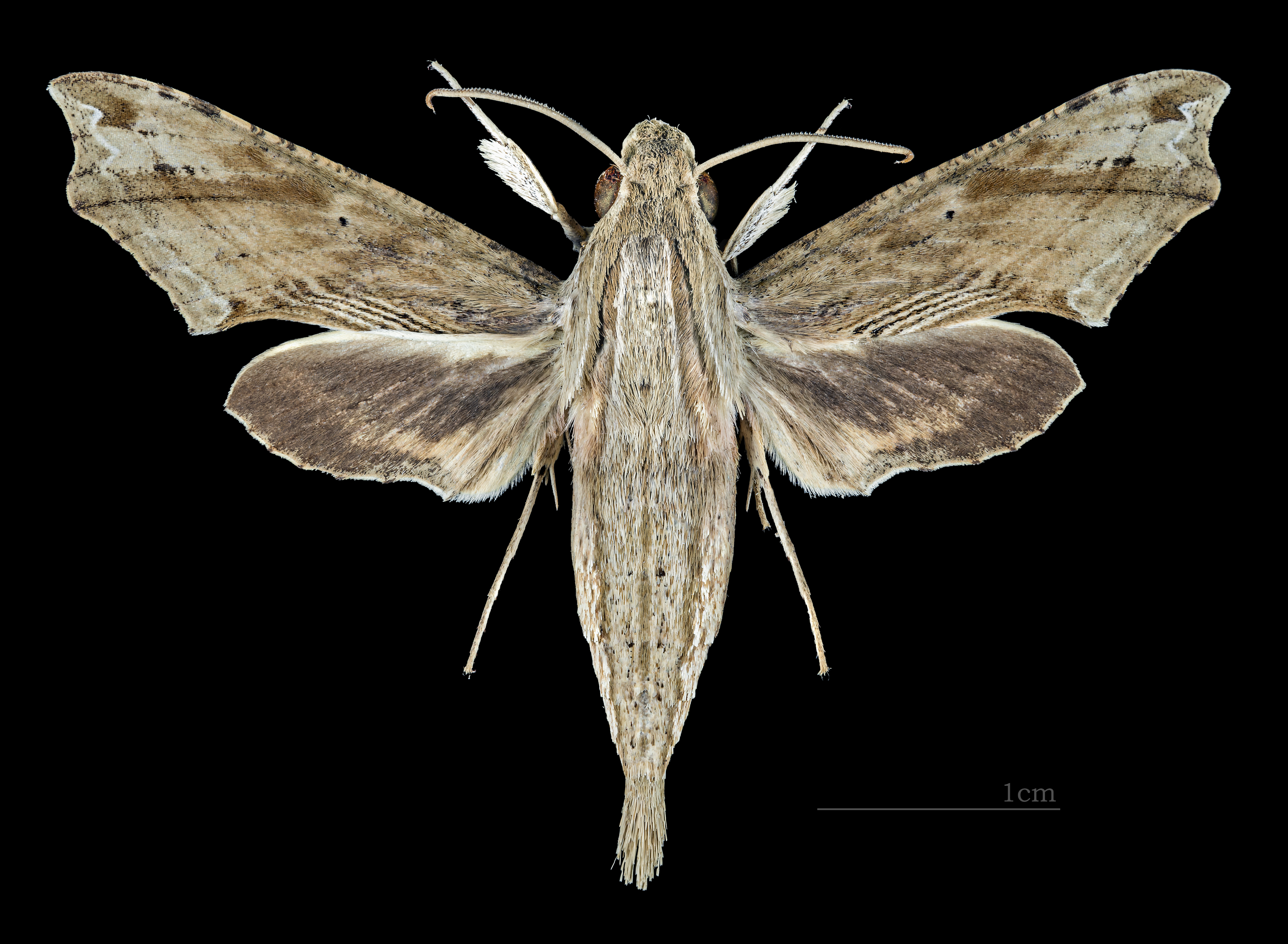
- Eupanacra malayana Male dorsal
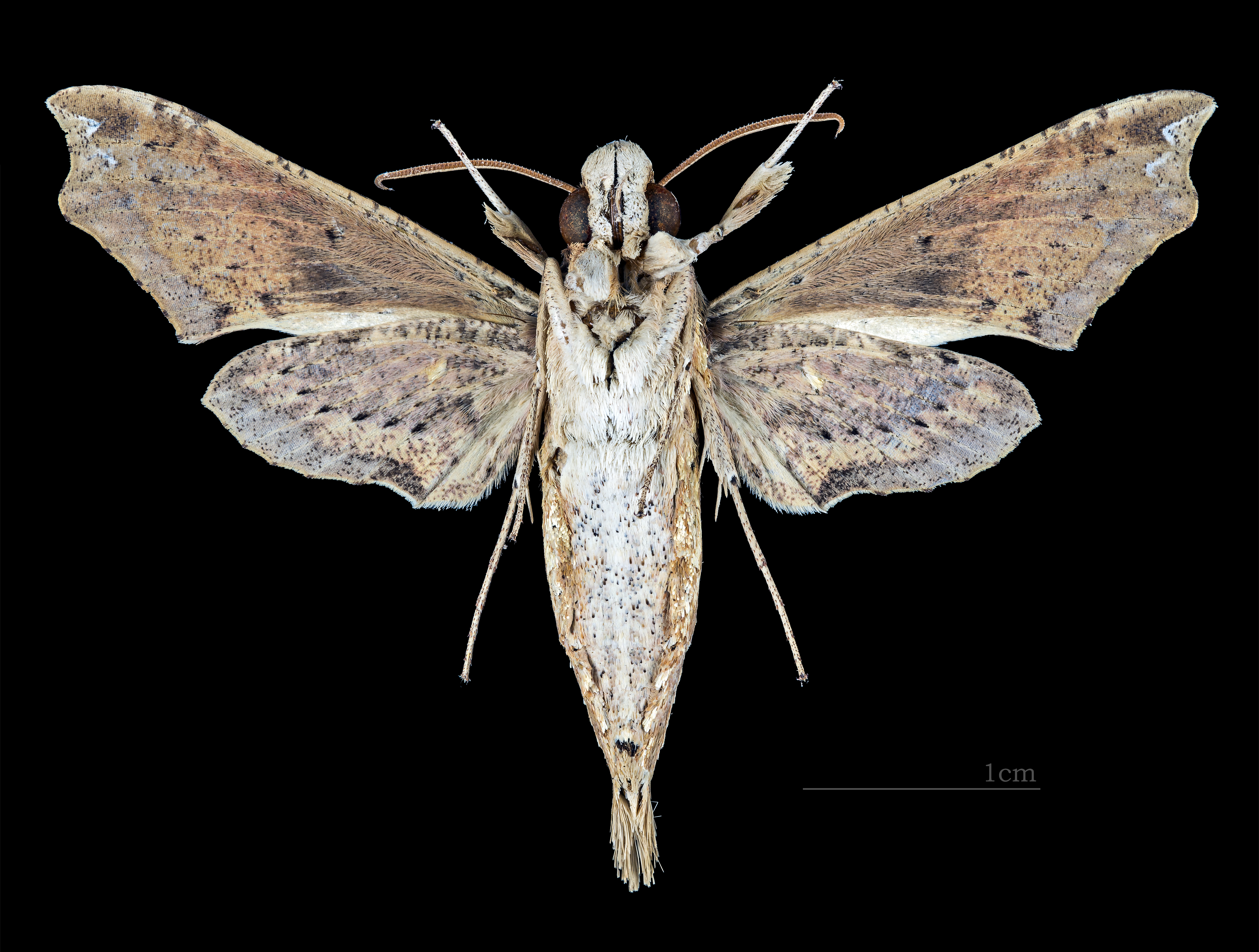
- Eupanacra malayana Male ventral

Scientific classification
- Kingdom: Animalia
- Phylum: Arthropoda
- Class: Insecta
- Order: Lepidoptera
- Family: Sphingidae
- Genus: Eupanacra
- Species: E. malayana

Binomial name
- Eupanacra malayana (Rothschild & Jordan, 1903)

Synonyms
- Panacra malayana Rothschild & Jordan, 1903; Panacra albicans Dupont, 1941; Panacra moseri Gehlen, 1930; Panacra malayana unilunata (Dupont, 1941)

= Eupanacra malayana =

Species of moth

Eupanacra malayana, the Malayan rippled hawkmoth, is a moth of the family Sphingidae.

== Distribution ==
It is known from Thailand, Hainan in southern China, Vietnam, Malaysia (Peninsular, Sarawak, Sabah), Indonesia (Sumatra, Java, Kalimantan, Sumbawa) and Palawan in the Philippines.

== Description ==
It is similar to Eupanacra automedon but distinguishable by the forewing outer margin having a blunt double point and generally a darker brown longitudinal shadow. The forewing upperside has a white angular mark which is contiguous with a brown spot. There is also a faint white angular mark. The underside of both wings has the distal border generally greyish in the male and dark brown in the female. The forewing underside is generally brown from the base to the postmedian area, apart from the costal edge. The postmedian line of vein dots is distinct in the male and obscure in the female. It is located parallel to the outer margin, but not angular.

== Biology ==
The larvae feed on Curculigo species.
