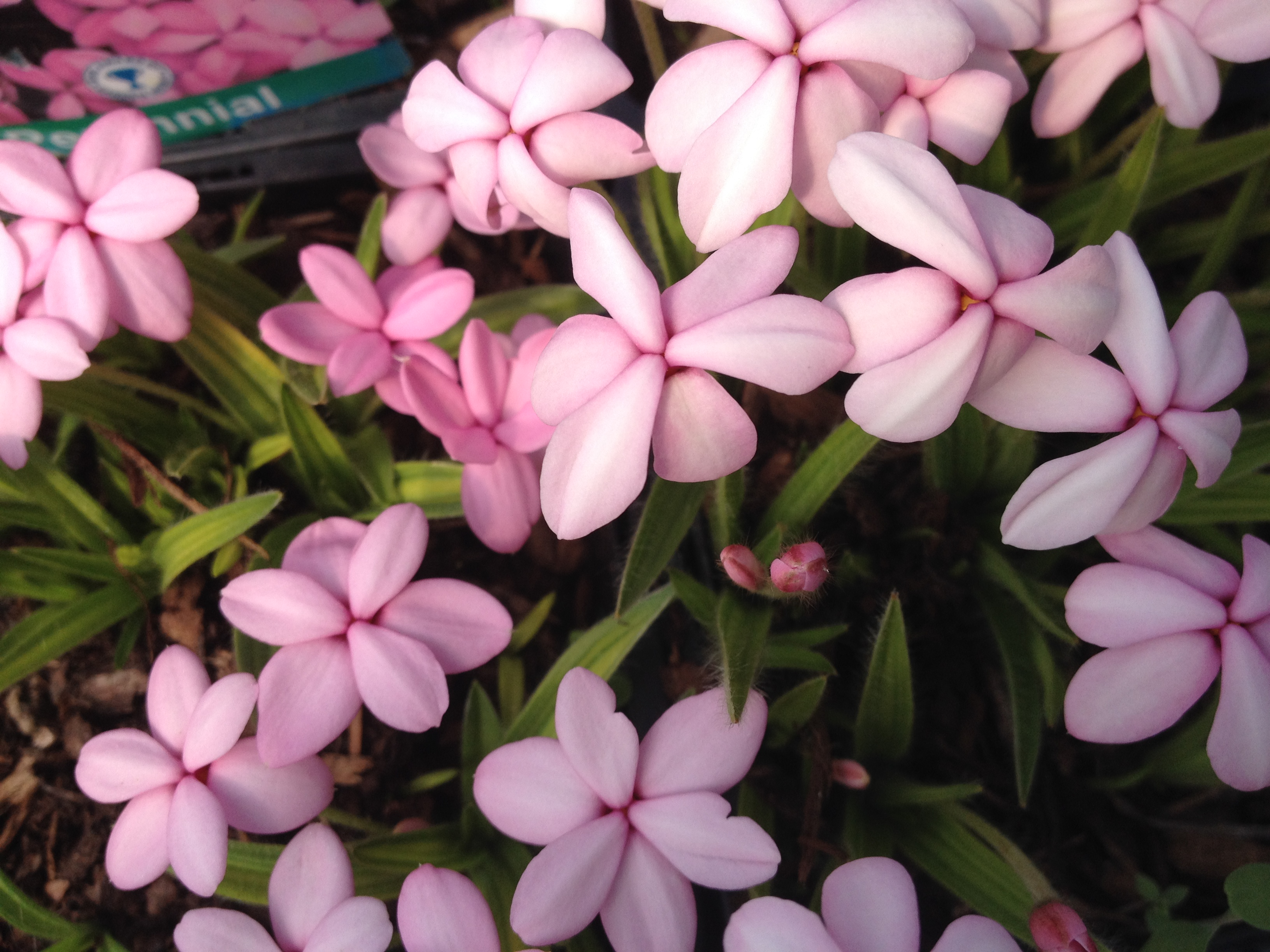

Scientific classification
- Kingdom: Plantae
- Clade: Tracheophytes
- Clade: Angiosperms
- Clade: Monocots
- Order: Asparagales
- Family: Hypoxidaceae
- Genus: Hypoxis
- Species: H. baurii

Binomial name
- Hypoxis baurii Baker (1876)

Synonyms
- Rhodohypoxis baurii (Baker) Nel (1914)

= Hypoxis baurii =

Species of flowering plant

Hypoxis baurii, the red star or rosy posy, is a species of flowering plant in the family Hypoxidaceae which is native to South Africa, Lesotho, and Swaziland, where it grows in damp meadows. Growing to no more than 10 cm (3.9 in) tall and broad, it is a herbaceous perennial with lanceolate, sharply folded, hairy grey-green leaves, and pale or deep pink star-shaped flowers throughout summer. The upturned flowers are held on slender, short straight stalks. The tepals are of equal length and held alternately in two ranks.

The specific epithet baurii is named for Reverend L. R. Baur (1825-1889), who collected Rhodohypoxis in South Africa.

== Cultivation ==
It prefers a peaty, acid soil which stays reliably moist in summer but dries out in winter to ensure a suitable dormant period. The necessary conditions may be achieved in a pot or trough, or by planting it in peat pockets. Propagation is by seed or division. Many cultivars have been developed for ornamental garden use. Most are larger-flowered and more vigorous than the species. Cultivar names include 'Apple Blossom', 'Dawn', 'Emily Peel' and 'Susan Garnett-Bottfield'.

Rhodohypoxis baurii has gained the Royal Horticultural Society's Award of Garden Merit.
