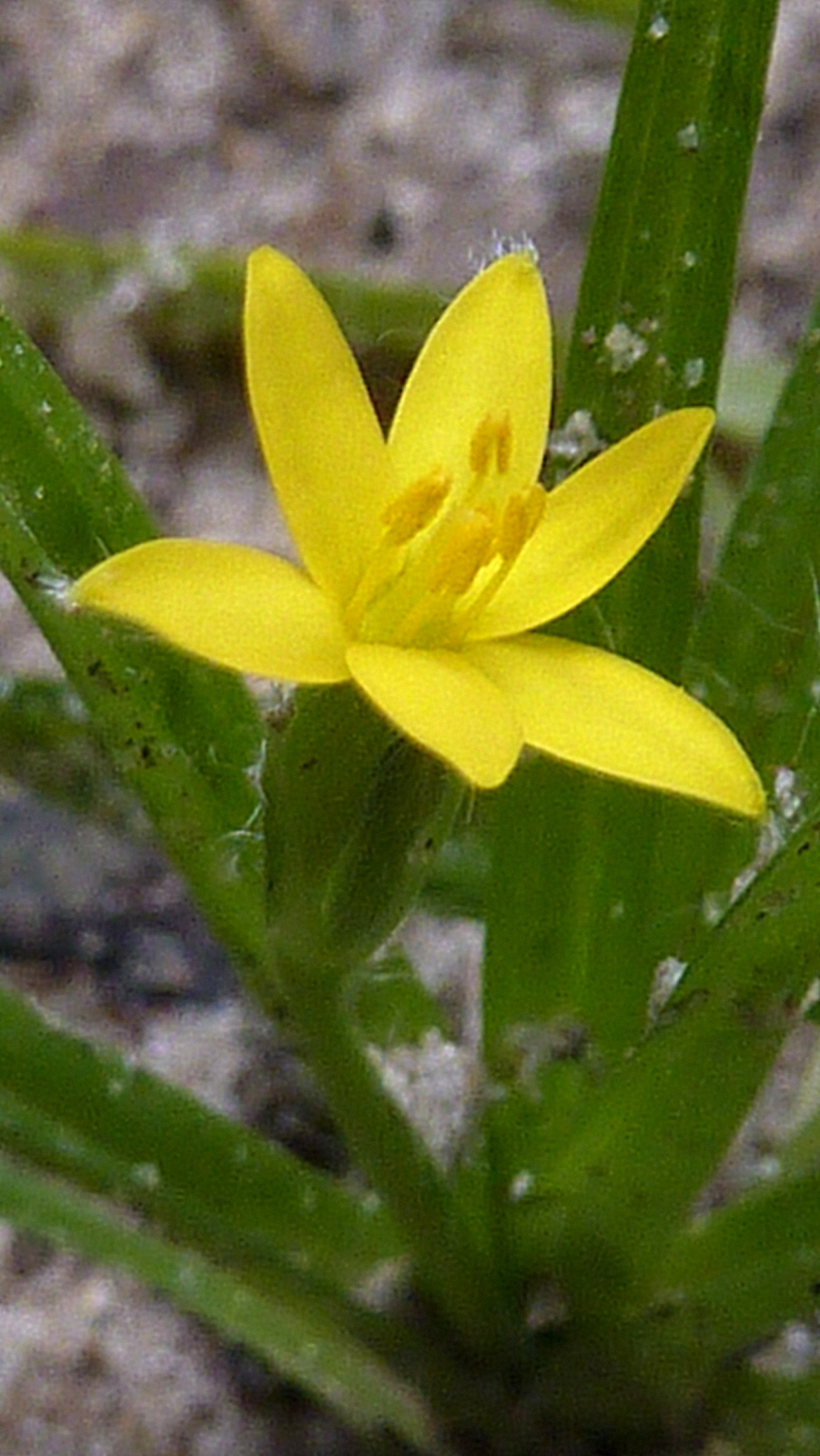

Scientific classification
- Kingdom: Plantae
- Clade: Tracheophytes
- Clade: Angiosperms
- Clade: Monocots
- Order: Asparagales
- Family: Hypoxidaceae
- Genus: Hypoxis
- Species: H. decumbens

Binomial name
- Hypoxis decumbens L.

= Hypoxis decumbens =

Coquí

Species of flowering plant

Hypoxis decumbens, the coquí, is a species of plant in the Hypoxidaceae, considered by some authors to be included within the Liliaceae or Amaryllidaceae. The species is widespread across South America, Central America, Mexico, and the West Indies.
