= Empodium elongatum =

Scientific classification
- Kingdom: Plantae
- Clade: Tracheophytes
- Clade: Angiosperms
- Clade: Monocots
- Order: Asparagales
- Family: Hypoxidaceae
- Genus: Empodium
- Species: E. elongatum

Binomial name
- Empodium elongatum (Nel) B.L.Burtt

Synonyms
- Forbesia elongata Nel

Species of flowering plant

Empodium elongatum is a perennial flowering plant and tuber-forming geophyte belonging to the genus Empodium. The species is native to Eswatini, Gauteng, KwaZulu-Natal, Lesotho and the Free State.
