= Palm grass =

Palm grass is a common name for several plants and may refer to:

- Curculigo capitulata
- Setaria palmifolia
