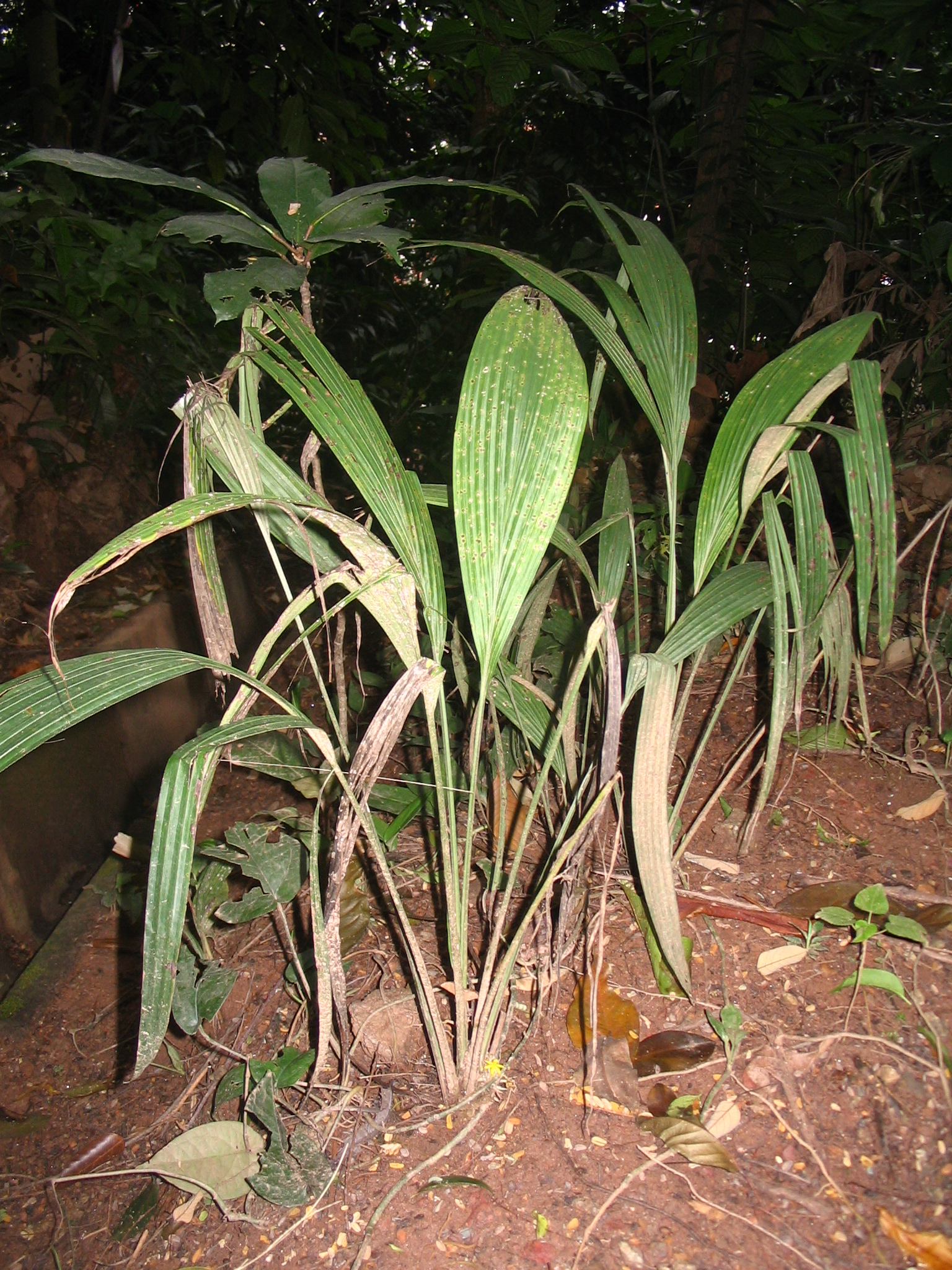

Scientific classification
- Kingdom: Plantae
- Clade: Tracheophytes
- Clade: Angiosperms
- Clade: Monocots
- Order: Asparagales
- Family: Hypoxidaceae
- Genus: Curculigo
- Species: C. latifolia

Binomial name
- Curculigo latifolia Dryand. ex W.T.Aiton

Varieties
- Curculigo latifolia var. latifolia; Curculigo latifolia var. megacarpa (Ridl.) Geerinck

Synonyms
- Aurota latifolia (Dryand. ex W.T.Aiton) Raf.; Molineria latifolia (Dryand. ex W.T.Aiton) Herb. ex Kurz

= Curculigo latifolia =

Species of flowering plant

Curculigo latifolia, also known as tambaka, molinpasna, lamba and lemba babi, is a species of flowering plant, a stemless perennial herb in the Hypoxidaceae family, that is native to Southeast Asia and produces edible fruits.

== Description ==
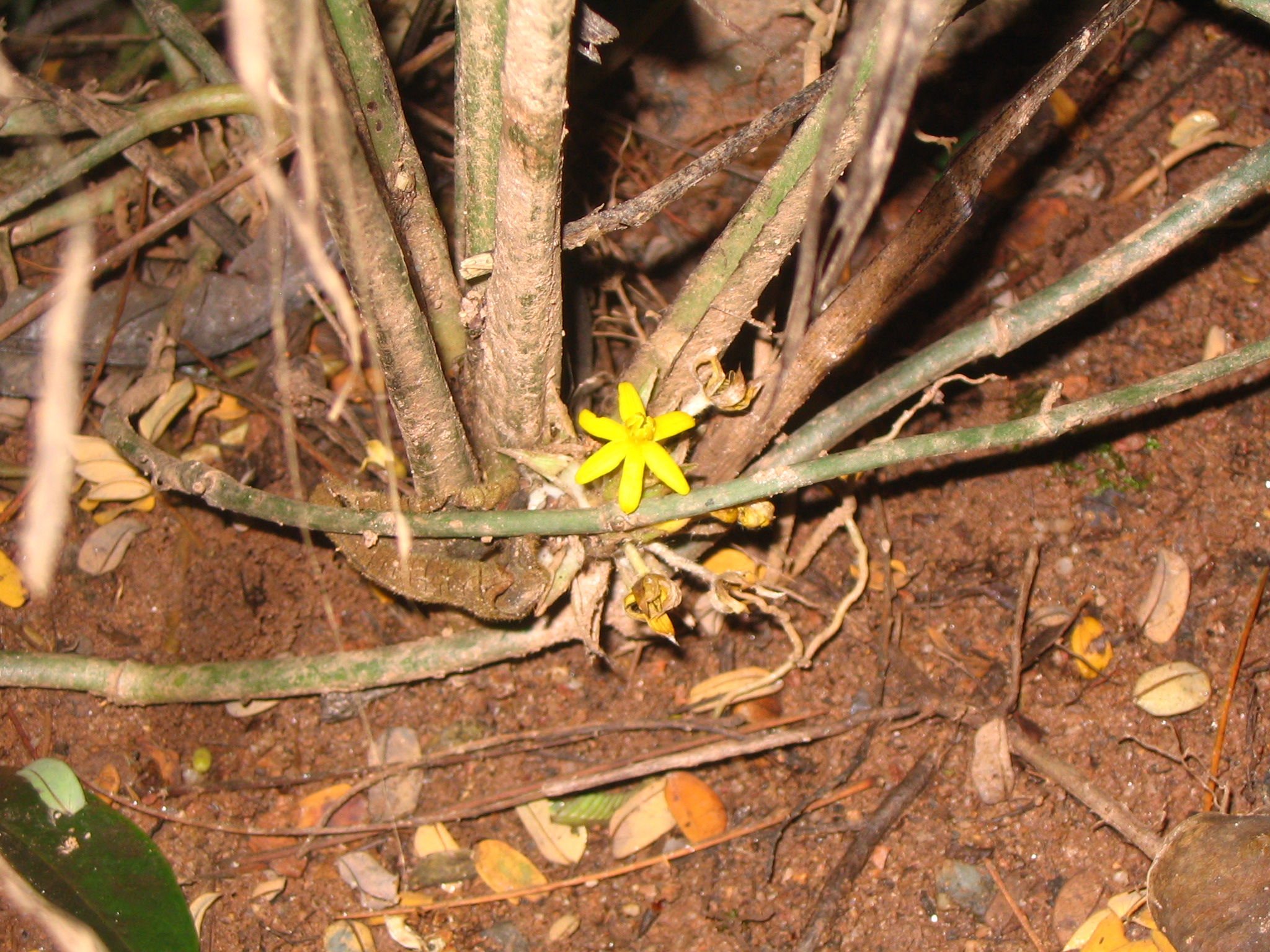
Molineria latifolia flower

The plant grows as a clump of 7–10 erect leaves, up to 1 m high in open areas and 2 m in forest shade. The leaves are 60–150 cm long by 8–25 cm wide. The inflorescences grow from the base of the leaves up 10 cm in height, forming compact 8 cm panicles of green bracts and yellow flowers. The fruits are oval berries, 2–3 cm by 1.2–1.7 cm in diameter, ripening white tinged pink, enclosing small black seeds in edible white pulp, with a taste similar to that of dragon fruit.

== Taxonomy ==
It was describeb by William Townsend Aiton in 1811 based on previous work by Jonas Carlsson Dryander.

=== Etymology ===
The specific epithet latifolia, from the Latin latus meaning broad, and folium meaning leaf, means broad-leaved.

== Distribution and habitat ==
Curculigo latifolia ranges from Bangladesh, Myanmar, and Guangdong in southern China through Indochina and central and western Malesia (Peninsular Malaysia, Sumatra, Java, Sulawesi, and the Philippines). It grows in lowland and hill mixed dipterocarp, lower montane, and heath forests, as well as in secondary forest and areas of disturbed vegetation where it is common around villages.
