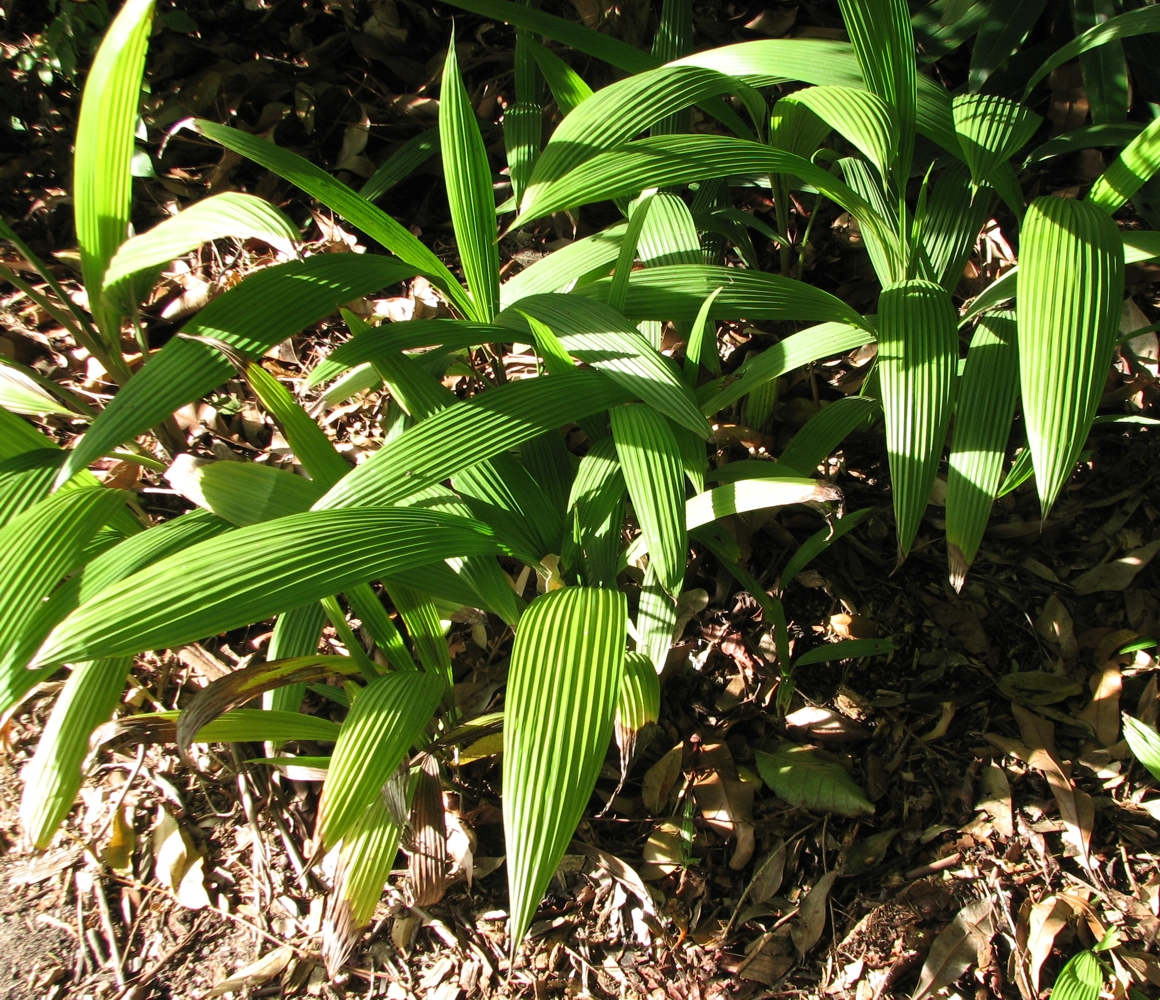

Scientific classification
- Kingdom: Plantae
- Clade: Embryophytes
- Clade: Tracheophytes
- Clade: Spermatophytes
- Clade: Angiosperms
- Clade: Monocots
- Order: Asparagales
- Family: Hypoxidaceae
- Genus: Curculigo
- Species: C. capitulata

Binomial name
- Curculigo capitulata (Lour.) Kuntze

Synonyms
- 16 synonyms: Curculigo foliis-variegatis Pynaert; Curculigo fuziwarae Yamam.; Curculigo glabra Merr.; Curculigo recurvata W.T.Aiton; Curculigo recurvata var. variegatea W.Bull; Curculigo strobiliformis D.Fang & D.H.Qin; Curculigo sumatrana Roxb.; Leucojum capitulatum Lour.; Molineria capitulata (Lour.) Herb.; Molineria hortensis Britton; Molineria plicata Colla; Molineria recurvata (W.T.Aiton) Herb.; Molineria sulcata Kurz; Molineria sumatrana (Roxb.) Herb.; Tupistra esquirolii H.Lév. & Vaniot; Veratrum mairei H.Lév.

= Curculigo capitulata =

Species of flowering plant

Curculigo capitulata is a species of stout herb that belongs to the family Hypoxidaceae. It is known by the common names palm grass, whale back, and weevil lily, and by various synonyms, including Molineria capitulata. It ranges from the Himalayas and eastern India through Indochina, southern China, Malesia, and New Guinea to Queensland, Australia, and the Solomon Islands. The plant has yellow flowers and oblong, papery pleated leaves with very short stems. In China and India, the plant has traditional uses as medicine to treat diseases such as hemorrhoids, asthma, and consumptive cough. In Southeast Asia, the plant is also used as food wrapping and the fibres are used to make fishing nets, ropes and false hair. However, in recent years Molineria capitulata is more often used as ornamental plants in gardens. In recent studies, M. capitulata was also found to have potential in treating several chronic diseases due to its high antifungal, antioxidant, cytotoxic, thrombolytic, anti-inflammatory, and analgesic activities.

== Description and appearance ==
Curculigo capitulata is a tuberous evergreen herb with thick rhizomes and thin stolons. In adverse conditions, the rhizomes may remain dormant for a long time.

The leaves are palm-like, which is why the plant is more known as palm grass. Usually, 4-7 leaves are held on 30–80 cm long stalks. Leaf blades are oblong-lanceolate shaped to sublong with pointed tips and with a surface pleated lengthwise. The leaves are usually 40–90 cm × 5–14 cm. The inflorescences are buried amid the leaf bases and concealed by the leaves.

Flowering stems are 15–30 cm long with brown hair. Flower-racemes are around 2.5–5 cm, densely flowered with headlike to subovoid shape. The flower bracts are lanceolate, and around 1.5-2.5 cm in length. The bracts are usually brown, green in colour and are covered by hair. The flowers span approx. 23 to 25 mm petal-tip to petal-tip.

Flowering stalks are around 7 mm long, carrying yellow flowers with blunt tips with hairy outer petals. In some places such as Bangladesh, each plant grows one flower most of the time and sometimes in groups of 2-3 flowers. But in some places, such as Nepal, each stem can carry a lot of flowers. Each flower usually has 6 petals that are oblong ovate in shapes and about 8 mm × 3.5–4 mm in length. The flowers are ginger-like and sweetly scented.

There are three sepals (yellow inner surface, hairy on the outer surface) and three yellow petals. The stamens are interesting as they originate separately and then come together/seem to combine to form a staminal tube around the stigma/style.

Stamens are 5–6 mm with filaments less than 1mm and linear anther about 5mm. The ovary is hairy with style longer than stamens. The stigma is almost petaloid in shape and is subcapitate.

The berries of Curculigo capitulata are white, round with 4-5mm diameter. The fruit are sweet when ripe. The seeds are black and are irregularly shaped. However, fruits are rarely seen in cultivated plants.

== Origin and distribution ==
Curculigo capitulata is native to South Asia, in countries such as India, Indonesia, Sri Lanka, Bangladesh and Nepal through Southeast to Southern China, Taiwan, East Himalayas and northern Australia. It can also be found in tropical Africa. However, the plant has spread far across the tropics and can be found naturalized and in cultivation.

C. capitulata was purposefully introduced as an ornamental plant and is widely grown in gardens. It is popular as a garden plant in lowlands and midlands of Sri Lanka. Although it is not abundant, but M. capitulata can also be found in older gardens in Hawaii.

== Habitats ==
Curculigo capitulata is usually found in forests, in shady places with moisture. Naturalized species can also be found along the stream banks and other wet habitat. It is usually found in places 800–2200 meters above sea level, but sometimes it can also be found as low as 300m. It can be found at elevations of 1000-1500m in Colombia.

Curculigo capitulata propagates by seeds and prefers temperature between 16 °C to 24 °C. The growth stops when the temperature is below 10 °C, but it can survive in very low temperature such as 0 °C for a short period of time before losing its aerial portion. Leaves will regrow in the spring.

The plant requires well drained, damp soils rich in organic matter, slightly acidic in pH.

== Cultivation and planting ==
It is usually cultivated in pots in organic loam. Drainage can be improved by incorporation of coarse sand and Perlite in the soil.

The species is easily cultivated as it tolerates different light conditions. It grows better in fertile loamy, moist and well-drained soil that is rich in organic matter.

Fertilisers such as Active 8 can be mixed with existing soil in 1:1 ratio. The soil should be well mulched to retain moisture. Harvest once a week for the first six weeks of planting. When pruning, damaged or yellowed leaves should be removed.

Frequent watering is required in the summer and less watering in winter to enable the upper layer of the loam to dry out. Monthly fertilization with hydro-soluble product with 1/3 of micro-elements in the spring-summer period is required.

== Uses ==
The Curculigo genus belongs to the family Hypoxidaceae. This family are traditionally used to treat diseases such as diabetes, blood loss and viral infections.

=== Ethnobotanical uses ===
Curculigo capitulata is mainly cultivated as an ornamental plant in modern society. The species was used to wrap fruits, vegetables and other food during transportation in Indonesia.

The papery texture of the leaves indicates the plant is rich in fibre. The fibres are ustilised in many ways by Southeast Asians. For example, the fibers collected from the leaves can be used to make fishing nets and ropes. The Luha people from northern Thailand use fibres collected from the leaves as wrappings. Additionally, the hill people of Camarine in Luzon, Philippines also make false hair using these fibres. In this culture, the fibre can also be used as a warp in toy looms for children.

The fruits of the species are edible, so they can be incorporated into everyday diet.

The leaves of the species can also be made into a leaf bandage to cover wounds.

=== Traditional medical uses ===
Curculigo capitulata has a long history of medical use in Southeast Asia. It is widely used in traditional Chinese and Indian medicine to treat severe chronic disease, rheumatic arthritis, nephritis, urinary tract infection, colic, asthma, jaundice, spermatorrhoea, consumptive cough, impotence, kidney asemia, hemorrhoids, diarrhea, and gonorrhea. It is also used in traditional Dai medicine to treat urinary tract infection, acute renal pelvis and phrenitis, nephritis-edema, cystitis, nephrolithiasis, hypertension and rheumatic arthritis. It can also be used in veterinary medicine and for land conservation. The rhizomes are used in traditional medicine for eye infection and gastric disorders.

=== Potential uses ===
The species has high antioxidant, cytotoxic, thrombolytic, anti-inflammatory and analgesic activities, indicating that the species has the potential to be used as treatment of several chronic diseases. Curculigo capitulata has a strong reduction capacity (absorbance if 1.87 at 400μg/mL), indicating strong antioxidant activity and reduction ability. The extract from the plant also displays inhibition of protein denaturation (500 μg/mL), indicating ability to prevent blood clotting.

The plant is also found to have high content in phenols (048.67 mg/g) and flavonoids (24 mg/g). Phenol is often used in skin care for its antimicrobial, anti-inflammatory and antiaging activities. This high concentration of phenol may indicate a potential use of M. capitulata extract in skin care. Flavonoids are often found in fruits, grains, and vegetables. It has anti-oxidation activity as it fights the free radicals in the body and helps the body relax.

A recent experiment also shows the roots of the species have antifungal activatity against Fusarium oxysportium f. sp. Cubense (Foc) tropical race 4 (Foc TR4). This pathogen is the main cause of fusarium wilt in banana, meaning that extracts from Curculigo capitulata has the potential to treat infectious diseases in banana.

Furthermore, the essential oil extracted from the fruit of Curculigo capitulata are also found to have antibacterial and antifungal activities. This means more applications of the plant can be found with further studies.

=== Ornamental uses ===
The species can be used for massed borders as soil cover at the base of large trees as it can accommodate shaded conditions. Little maintenance is required, and the plant tolerates a range of temperatures.

== Invasiveness ==
Curculigo capitulata has spread from Eastern Asia worldwide as it has been introduced globally as an ornamental plant. The species has some weed potential.

The plant is capable of vegetative propagation and can resprout from tuberous, underground stems, forming dense clumps which excludes other plants. It can also tolerate adverse conditions such as low temperature and shade, meaning that will cover any soil that is available. The plant may also propagate in undesirable areas, taking over the habitats of nearby plants and reducing biodiversity. Thus Curculigo capitulata is considered a weedy plant and has a high risk of decreasing biodiversity.

However, the plant does not have any spines, burrs or spikes and is not toxic. It is used only for ornamental purposes. Despite being good at flowering, seeds are rarely produced, and a plant takes 4–10 years to reach maturity. These factors combined with its attractiveness to browsing animals mean the plant has a low risk of reducing biodiversity.

== Prevention and control ==
Curculigo capitulata is not classified as a weed or invasive species in most countries such as South Africa. Monitoring of naturalized population of the species is advised in Hawaii with probable consideration for phasing it out of the sale stock of endorsed nurseries.

=== Physical control ===
Even though the plant can have extensive rhizomes, it can be removed by hand tools, taking care not to damage the root systems of nearby plants.

== Reproductive methods ==
There is little information on the reproductive methods of the plant, but it is thought to reproduce by seeds and rhizomes.

Though rare, reproduction by seeds of the species occurs in draining organic loam with a humid environment and temperature around 24 to 26 degrees Celsius. The seeds of Curculigo captulata have short viability, meaning that planting should be undertaken as soon as they are ripe.

Vegetative propagation occurs by division of rhizomes in mature clumps.

== Related disease ==
Though the plants are rarely bothered by most diseases, leaf spots and blights can occur on the leaves of Curculigo capitulata. This disease is caused by Curvularia curculiginis, identified by morphology. These symptoms were observed in Shenzhen Fair Lake Botanical Garden in 2018, where many round or irregular brown necrotic spots varied in sizes was observed throughout the leaves. In serious cases, leaves withered entirely. By testing the sample with pathogenicity tests, C. curculiginis was found to be the pathogen of such disease.
