= Curculigoside =

Curculigoside A, a curculigoside

Curculigosides are phenols that have been isolated from a variety of plant sources. Curculigoside A, B, C and D can be found in Curculigo orchioides. Curculigoside B can be isolated by high-speed counter-current chromatography. Curculigosides B and D have in vitro activity against β-amyloid aggregation.
