= Sinocurculigo =

Scientific classification
- Kingdom: Plantae
- Clade: Tracheophytes
- Clade: Angiosperms
- Clade: Monocots
- Order: Asparagales
- Family: Hypoxidaceae
- Genus: Sinocurculigo; Z.J.Liu, L.J.Chen & K.Wei Liu
- Species: S. taishanica

Binomial name
- Sinocurculigo taishanica Z.J.Liu, L.J.Chen & K.Wei Liu

Genus of plants

Sinocurculigo is a monotypic genus of flowering plants belonging to the family Hypoxidaceae. The only species is Sinocurculigo taishanica.

Its native range is Southeastern China.
