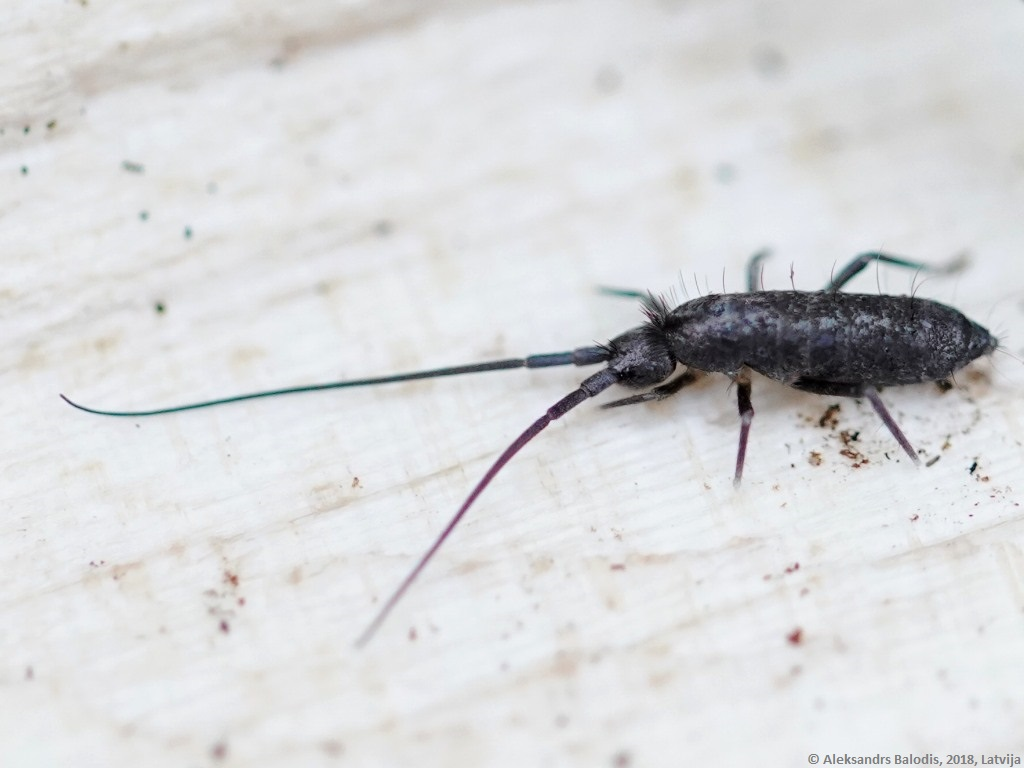
- Pogonognathellus longicornis

Scientific classification
- Domain: Eukaryota
- Kingdom: Animalia
- Phylum: Arthropoda
- Class: Collembola
- Order: Entomobryomorpha
- Family: Tomoceridae
- Genus: Pogonognathellus; Börner, 1908

= Pogonognathellus =

Genus of arthropods

Pogonognathellus is a genus of arthropods belonging to the family Tomoceridae.

Species:

- Pogonognathellus flavescens
- Pogonognathellus longicornis
