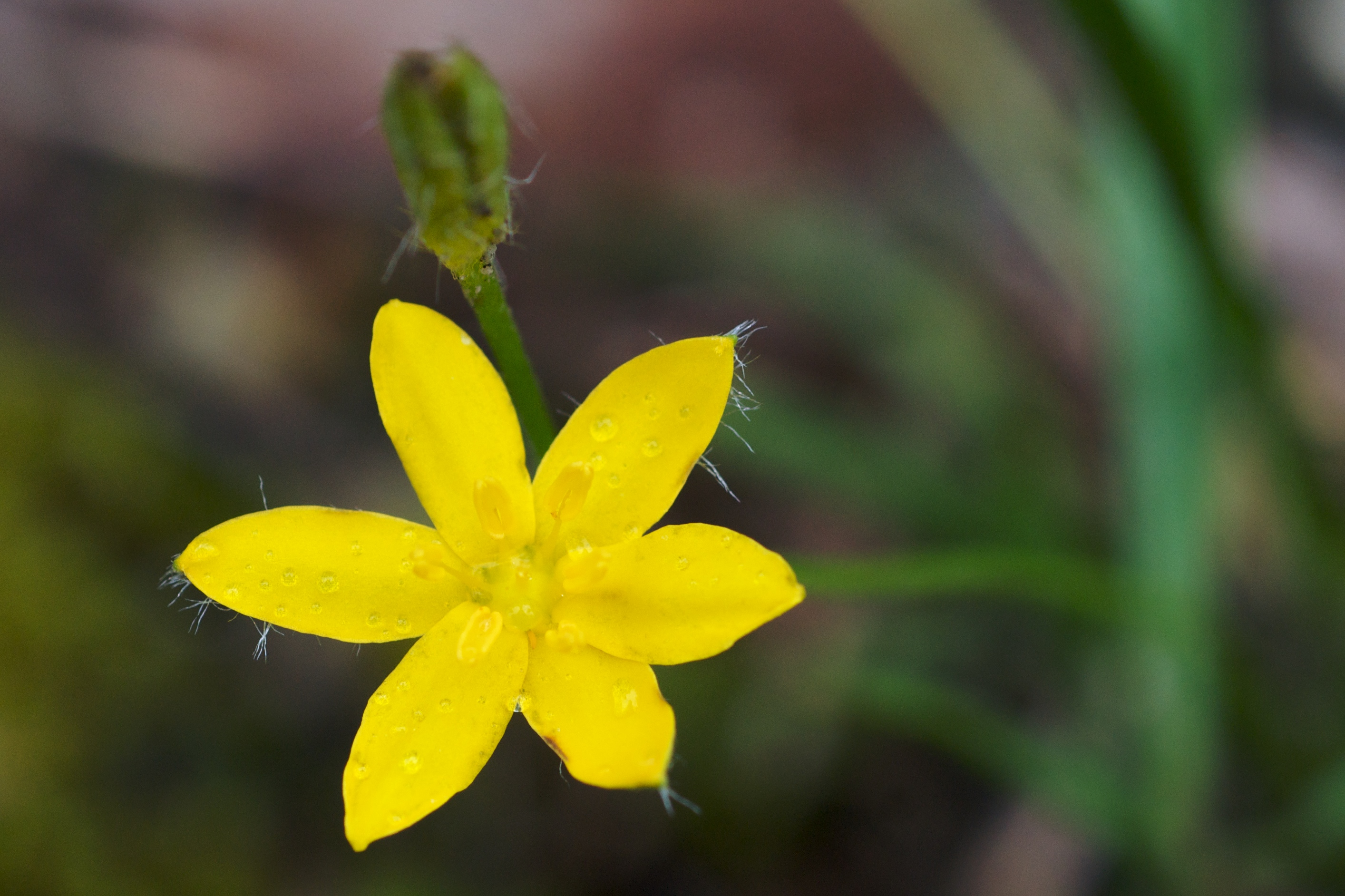

Conservation status
- Secure (NatureServe)

Scientific classification
- Kingdom: Plantae
- Clade: Tracheophytes
- Clade: Angiosperms
- Clade: Monocots
- Order: Asparagales
- Family: Hypoxidaceae
- Genus: Hypoxis
- Species: H. hirsuta

Binomial name
- Hypoxis hirsuta (L.) Coville

Synonyms
- List: Hypoxis carolinensis Michx. (1803); Hypoxis erecta L. (1759); Hypoxis graminea Pursh (1813); Hypoxis grandis Pollard (1903); Hypoxis hirsuta f. villosissima Fernald (1940); Hypoxis micrantha Pollard (1903); Hypoxis pallida Salisb. (1796); Hypoxis pilosa Raf. (1840); Ornithogalum hirsutum L. (1753)

= Hypoxis hirsuta =

Plant species in the star-grass genus

Hypoxis hirsuta, commonly known as common goldstar, common star-grass, eastern yellow stargrass, yellow star grass, or yellow star flower, is a perennial ornamental plant in the family Hypoxidaceae. Sometimes this plant is placed in the family Amaryllidaceae or the family Liliaceae. The species is native to the United States, Canada, and northeastern Mexico.

== Description ==
H. hirsuta has grass-like, basal leaves that are up to 30 cm (12 in) long and one or more shorter stems, growing up from the rosette of leaves to 20 cm (8 in) long. The leaves have smooth margins and are elliptical in shape. Both the leaves and the stem have scattered white hairs.

Flowers appear April to May at the end of each stem in a group, or umbel, of 2 to 6, occasionally only 1. The flowers are 5–13 mm (0.2–0.5 in) long, with 3 yellow petals and 3 yellow sepals spreading outwards. The flowers will open in the morning but typically wilt in the hot afternoon sun. When not flowering, the plant can resemble grass, but it is not a grass.

== Etymology ==
The genus name Hypoxis is from the Greek words hypo and oxys, meaning "sharp below", referring to how the seedpods have a tapered base. The specific epithet hirsuta is Latin for "hairy".

== Distribution and habitat ==
H. hirsuta is native in the United States from New Mexico to the west, Texas to the south, the Canadian border to the north, and Maine to the east. In Canada, it is native in Manitoba, Saskatchewan, and Ontario. It is also native in northeastern Mexico, south to Tamualipas. The plant grows in moist to slightly dry habitats such as prairies, savannas, open woodlands, fens, glades, abandoned fields, and lawns.

== Ecology ==
The flowers attract small bees that feed on its pollen.

== Characteristics & Attributes ==
Soil Moisture

• Dry

• Average

• Low Maintenance

Ecoregion

Eastern Great Lakes Lowlands

Northeastern Coastal Zone

Atlantic Coastal Pine Barrens

Acadian Plains and Hills

Northeastern Highlands

Exposure

• Sun

• Part Shade
