= Curculigoside A =

- Chemical structure of curculigoside A

Names
- IUPAC name [2-(β-D-Glucopyranosyloxy)-5-hydroxyphenyl]methyl 2,6-dimethoxybenzoate
- Systematic IUPAC name (5-Hydroxy-2-{[(2S,3R,4S,5S,6R)-3,4,5-trihydroxy-6-(hydroxymethyl)oxan-2-yl]oxy}phenyl)methyl 2,6-dimethoxybenzoate

Identifiers
CAS Number	85643-19-2
3D model (JSmol)	Interactive image
ChEMBL	ChEMBL258048
ChemSpider	139722
PubChem CID	158845
UNII	A6S7X76UM5
CompTox Dashboard (EPA)	DTXSID30234896
- InChI: InChI=1S/C22H26O11/c1-29-14-4-3-5-15(30-2)17(14)21(28)31-10-11-8-12(24)6-7-13(11)32-22-20(27)19(26)18(25)16(9-23)33-22/h3-8,16,18-20,22-27H,9-10H2,1-2H3/t16-,18-,19+,20-,22-/m1/s1 Key: SJJRKHVKAXVFJQ-QKYBYQKWSA-N
- SMILES: O=C(OCc2c(O[C@@H]1O[C@@H]([C@@H](O)[C@H](O)[C@H]1O)CO)ccc(O)c2)c3c(OC)cccc3OC

Properties
Chemical formula	C_{22}H_{26}O_{11}
Molar mass	466.439 g·mol^{−1}
- Except where otherwise noted, data are given for materials in their standard state (at 25 °C [77 °F], 100 kPa). verify (what is ?) Infobox references

Curculigoside A is a curculigoside found in Curculigo orchioides.
