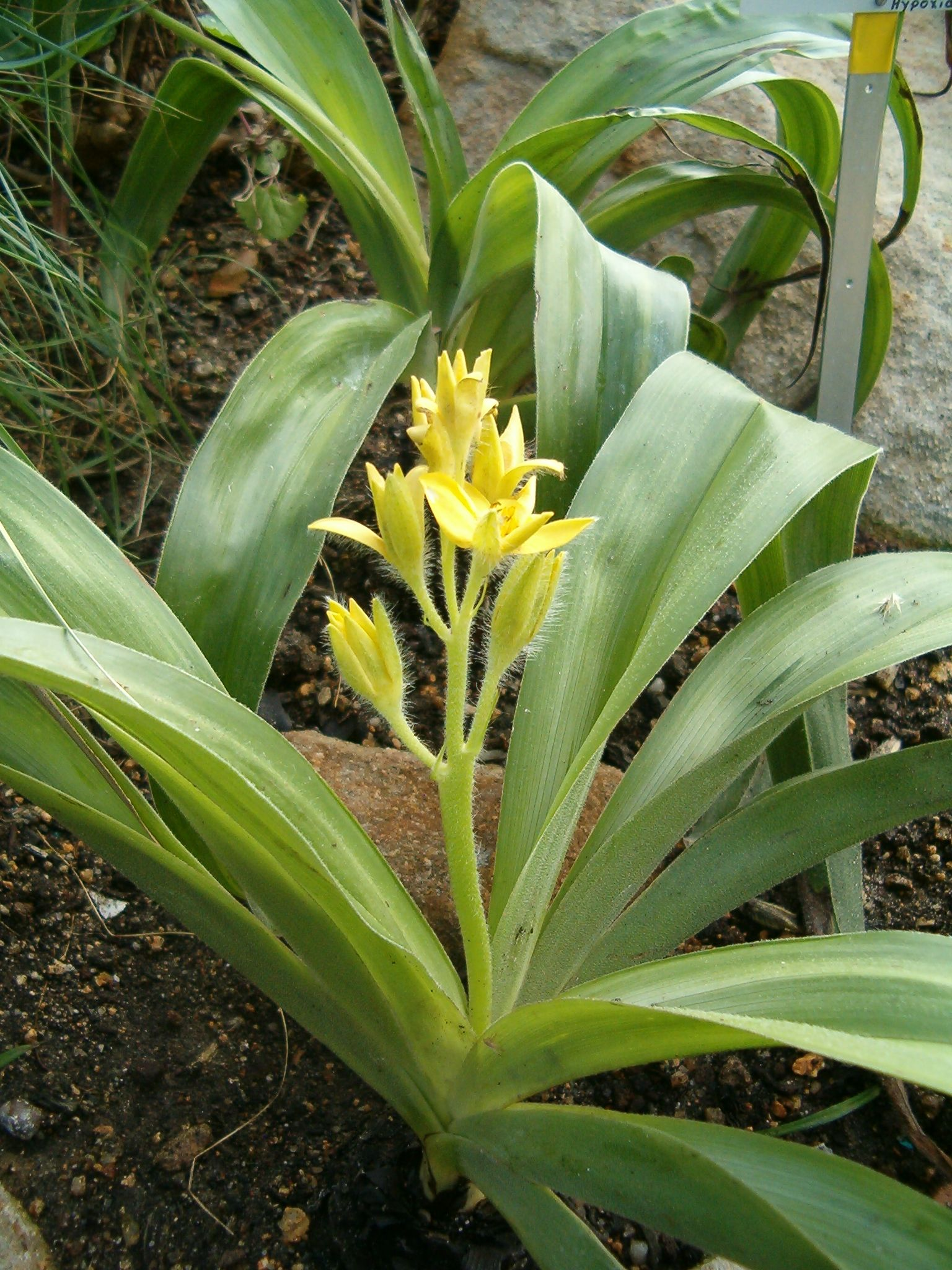

Scientific classification
- Kingdom: Plantae
- Clade: Embryophytes
- Clade: Tracheophytes
- Clade: Spermatophytes
- Clade: Angiosperms
- Clade: Monocots
- Order: Asparagales
- Family: Hypoxidaceae
- Genus: Hypoxis
- Species: H. hemerocallidea

Binomial name
- Hypoxis hemerocallidea Fisch.Mey. & Avé-Lall.

Synonyms
- Hypoxis elata Hook.f. nom. illeg.; Hypoxis obconica Nel; Hypoxis patula Nel; Hypoxis rooperi T.Moore

= Hypoxis hemerocallidea =

Species of flowering plant

Hypoxis hemerocallidea, the African star grass or African potato, is a medicinal plant in the Hypoxidaceae family. It is native to southern Africa from South Africa as far north as Mozambique and Zimbabwe. This plant is the best known member of this genus.

== Medicinal uses ==
Hypoxis is promoted as an alternative medicine treatment for benign prostatic hyperplasia, but research has found no evidence of beneficial effect. Additionally, one study suggests Hypoxis alters the activity of cytochrome P450, suggesting that it may interfere with the effectiveness of other drugs or supplements, such as antiretroviral drugs.
