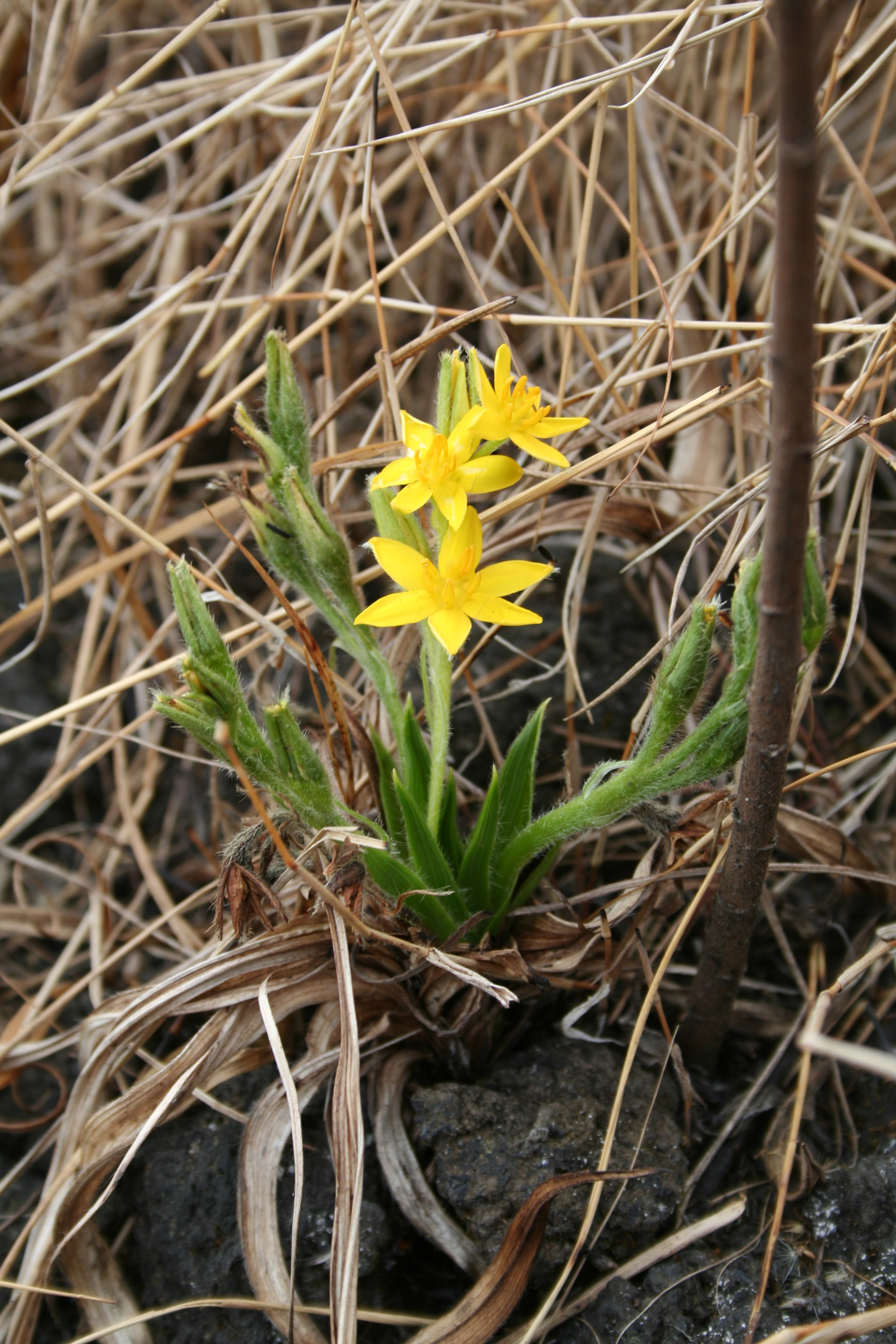
- Hypoxis angustifolia

Scientific classification
- Kingdom: Plantae
- Clade: Tracheophytes
- Clade: Angiosperms
- Clade: Monocots
- Order: Asparagales
- Family: Hypoxidaceae
- Genus: Hypoxis; L.

Synonyms
- Niobea Willd. ex Schult. & Schult.f. (1830); Rhodohypoxis Nel (1914); × Rhodoxis B.Mathew (1998); Schinnongia Schrank. (1822); Upoda Adans. (1763)

= Hypoxis =

Hypoxis Temporal range: Pliocene - recent

Genus of flowering plants

Hypoxis is a genus of flowering plants of the family Hypoxidaceae. The genus has an "almost cosmopolitan" distribution, occurring in Africa, the Americas, Asia, and Australia. Europe lacks native species. Most species are in the Southern Hemisphere, especially in southern Africa. Common names for the genus include star-grass, star lily, yellow stars, African potato, and stars. The genus is the largest of the Hypoxidaceae and has its centre of variation in South Africa, where it occurs in open undisturbed grasslands. The name Hypoxis was taken over by Linnaeus in 1759 from a name coined by Paul Reneaulme in 1611 for a superficially similar species of Gagea and meaning "a little sour", referring to the taste of that plant's leaves.

== Description ==
These plants are perennial herbs with corms or rhizomes. Some have tubers. The aboveground herbage is a layered cluster of lance-shaped, linear, or hairlike leaves, sometimes sheathed together at the bases. The blades are usually at least slightly hairy. The flowers are borne on a short, stemlike scape in a raceme or umbel arrangement, or sometimes singly. The flower has six yellow tepals which may be hairy, especially on the undersides. The undersides may also be whitish or tinged green or red. Occasional flowers have four or eight tepals. The fruit is a capsule with a few to many small, oily seeds.

The seeds are needed to identify many species. Most have seeds less than 2 mm long, so microscopic examination is required.

== Uses ==
Hypoxis plants have long played a role in traditional African medicine; H. hemerocallidea and H. colchicifolia are the best known species used to make medicine and teas. The genus is not only used in traditional medicine, it has become important also in pharmaceutical preparations.

Archaeological evidence found in ashes in Border Cave, South Africa has revealed that early humans roasted the rhizomes of some of the more palatable species of Hypoxis as long as 170,000 years ago.

== Species ==
Sources have estimated 90 or 100 to 150 species in the genus. As of September 2026, Plants of the World Online accepts 91 species:

- Hypoxis abyssinica Hochst.
- Hypoxis acuminata Baker
- Hypoxis angustifolia Lam.
- Hypoxis argentea Harv. ex Baker
- Hypoxis arillacea R.J.F.Hend.
- Hypoxis atlantica Funez, Hassemer & J.P.R.Ferreira
- Hypoxis aurea Lour.
- Hypoxis bampsiana Wiland
- Hypoxis baurii Baker
- Hypoxis camerooniana Baker
- Hypoxis canaliculata Baker
- Hypoxis catamarcensis Brackett
- Hypoxis cavernicola M.D.Barrett
- Hypoxis colchicifolia Baker
- Hypoxis colliculata Sánchez-Ken
- Hypoxis costata Baker
- Hypoxis cuanzensis Welw. ex Baker
- Hypoxis curtissii Rose in J.K.Small – Curtiss' star-grass
- Hypoxis decumbens L.
- Hypoxis demissa Nel
- Hypoxis dinteri Nel
- Hypoxis domingensis Urb.
- Hypoxis exaltata Nel
- Hypoxis exilis R.J.F.Hend. – swamp star
- Hypoxis filiformis Baker
- Hypoxis fischeri Pax
- Hypoxis flanaganii Baker
- Hypoxis floccosa Baker
- Hypoxis galpinii Baker
- Hypoxis gerrardii Baker
- Hypoxis goetzei Harms
- Hypoxis gregoriana Rendle
- Hypoxis hemerocallidea Fisch., C.A.Mey. & Avé-Lall. – African potato
- Hypoxis hirsuta (L.) Coville – common goldstar
- Hypoxis humilis Kunth
- Hypoxis hybrida (B.Mathew) Z.H.Feng
- Hypoxis hygrometrica Labill. – golden weather-glass
- Hypoxis interjecta Nel
- Hypoxis juncea Sm. – fringed yellow star-grass
- Hypoxis kilimanjarica Baker
- Hypoxis kraussiana Buchinger ex C.Krauss
- Hypoxis lata Nel
- Hypoxis lejolyana Wiland
- Hypoxis leucotricha Fritsch
- Hypoxis limicola B.L.Burtt
- Hypoxis longifolia Baker
- Hypoxis lucens McVaugh
- Hypoxis ludwigii Baker
- Hypoxis lusalensis Wiland
- Hypoxis malaissei Wiland
- Hypoxis marginata R.Br.
- Hypoxis membranacea Baker
- Hypoxis mexicana Schult. & Schult.f. – Mexican yellow star-grass
- Hypoxis milloides Baker
- Hypoxis monanthos Baker
- Hypoxis muhilensis Wiland
- Hypoxis multiceps Buchinger ex Baker
- Hypoxis neliana Schinz
- Hypoxis nervosa R.J.F.Hend.
- Hypoxis nivea Y.Singh
- Hypoxis nyasica Baker
- Hypoxis oblonga Nel
- Hypoxis obtusa Burch. ex Ker Gawl.
- Hypoxis oligophylla Baker
- Hypoxis parvifolia Baker
- Hypoxis parvula Baker
- Hypoxis polystachya Welw. ex Baker
- Hypoxis potosina Brackett
- Hypoxis pratensis R.Br.
- Hypoxis protrusa Nel
- Hypoxis pulchella G.L.Nesom
- Hypoxis rigida Chapm.
- Hypoxis rigidula Baker
- Hypoxis robusta Nel
- Hypoxis rubella Baker
- Hypoxis sagittata Nel
- Hypoxis schimperi Baker
- Hypoxis sessilis L.
- Hypoxis setosa Baker
- Hypoxis sobolifera Jacq.
- Hypoxis stellipilis Ker Gawl.
- Hypoxis suffruticosa Nel
- Hypoxis symoensiana Wiland
- Hypoxis tepicensis Brackett
- Hypoxis tetramera Hilliard & B.L.Burtt
- Hypoxis uniflorata Markötter
- Hypoxis upembensis Wiland
- Hypoxis urceolata Nel
- Hypoxis villosa L.f.
- Hypoxis wrightii (Baker) Brackett
- Hypoxis zeyheri Baker

== Gallery ==
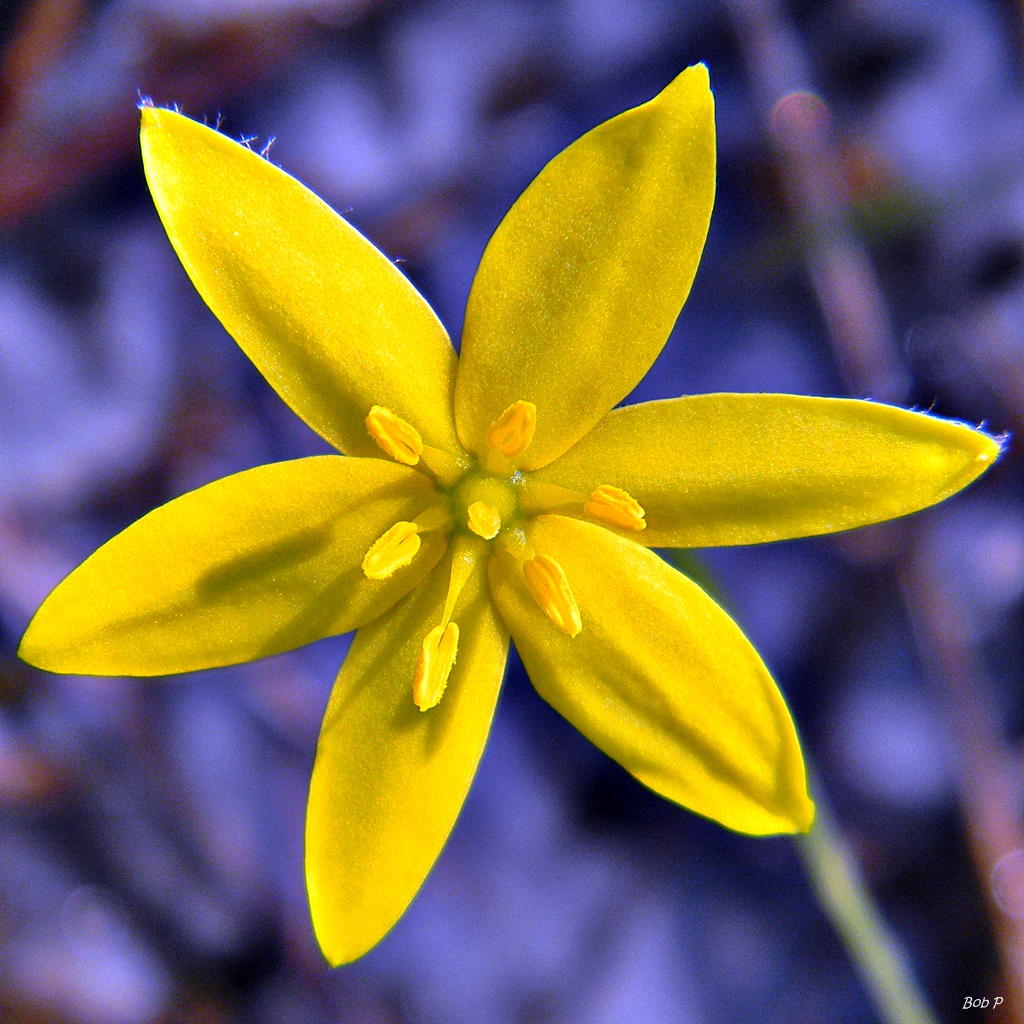
Hypoxis juncea

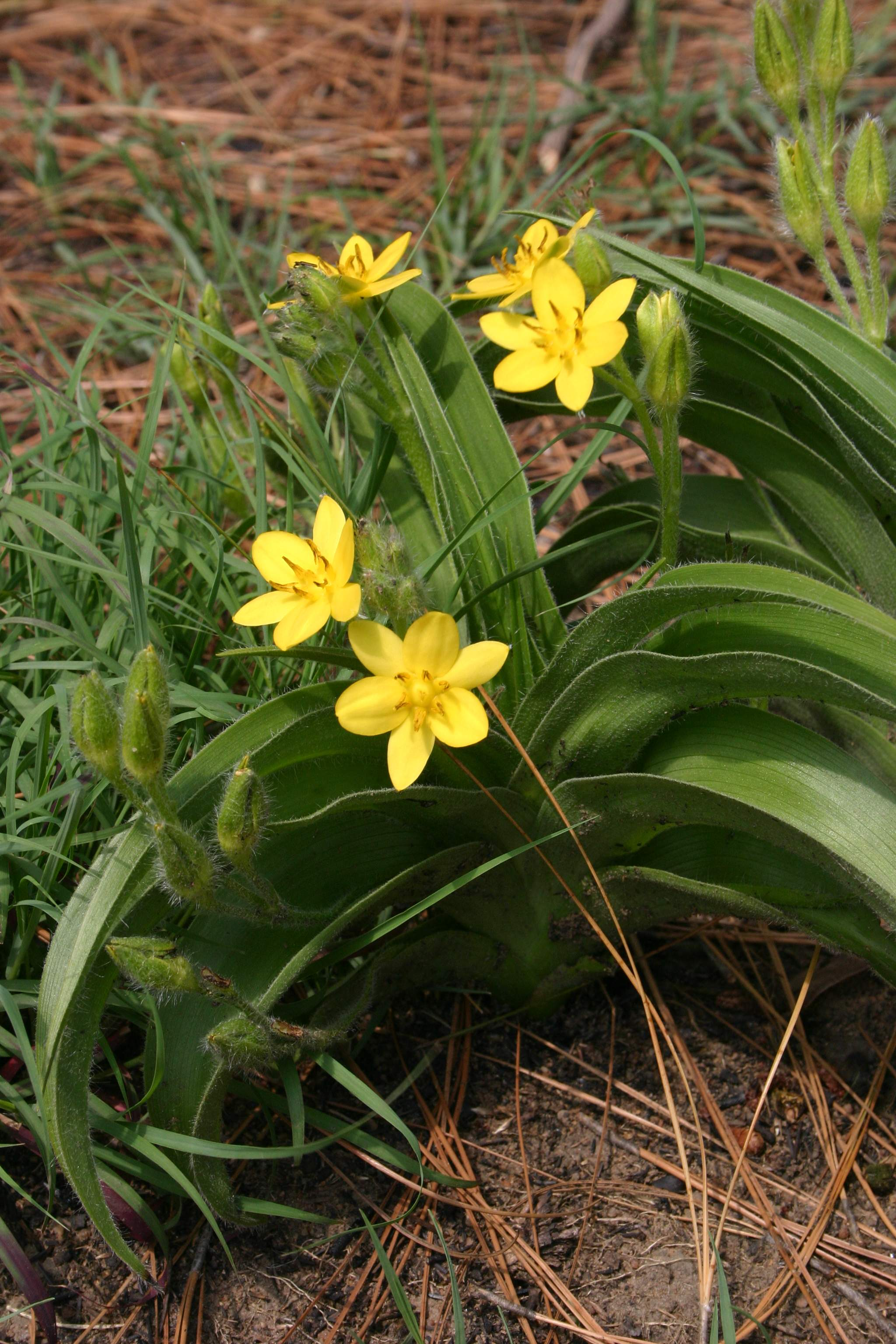
Hypoxis hemerocallidea

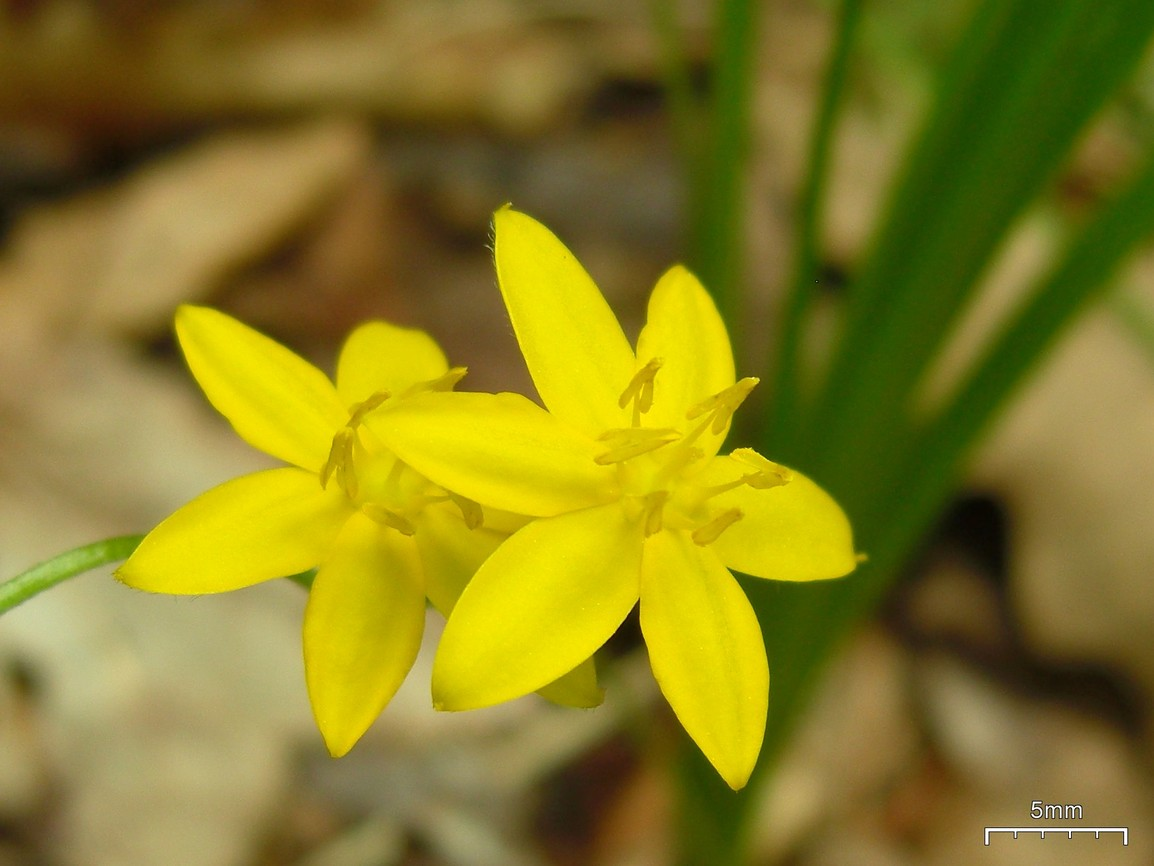
Hypoxis hirsuta
