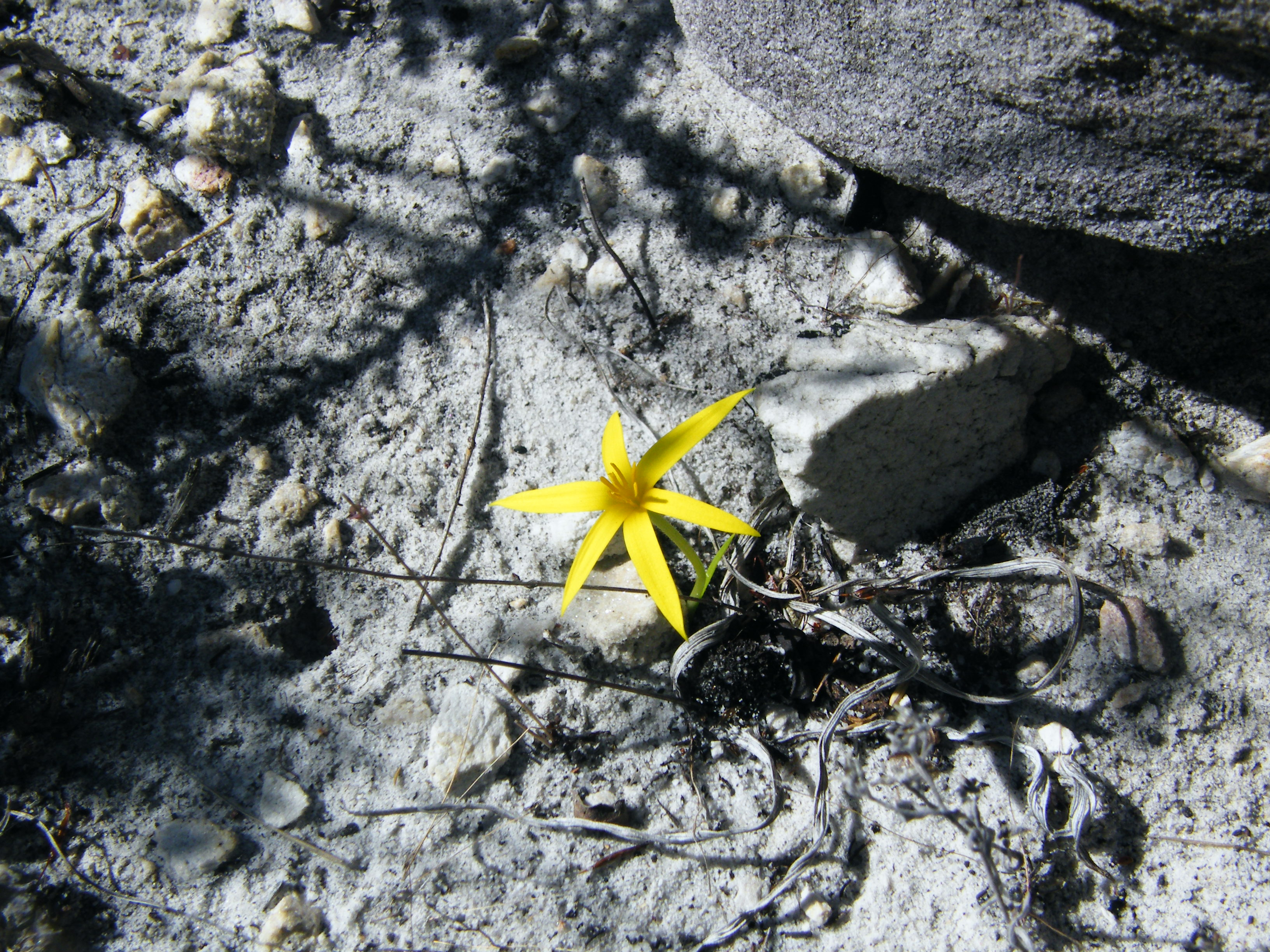
- Empodium plicatum

Scientific classification
- Kingdom: Plantae
- Clade: Tracheophytes
- Clade: Angiosperms
- Clade: Monocots
- Order: Asparagales
- Family: Hypoxidaceae
- Genus: Empodium; Salisb.

Synonyms
- Fabricia Thunb. 1779, illegitimate, not Adans. 1763 nor Scop. 1777; Forbesia Eckl. ex Nel

= Empodium =

Genus of flowering plants

Empodium is a genus of flowering plants in the family Hypoxidaceae, first described in 1866. It grows from a small corm which produces lance-shaped or pleated and sometimes hairy, star-shaped flowers and leaves with 10–30 centimetres (4–12 in) long in Autumn season. The genus is native to winter-rainfall areas in South Africa, Eswatini, Lesotho, and Namibia.

Species

1. Empodium elongatum (Nel) B.L.Burtt – Lesotho, Eswatini, Lesotho
2. Empodium flexile (Nel) M.F.Thomps. ex Snijman – Cape Province
3. Empodium gloriosum (Nel) B.L.Burtt – Cape Province
4. Empodium monophyllum (Nel) B.L.Burtt – KwaZulu-Natal, Eswatini
5. Empodium namaquensis (Baker) M.F.Thomps. – Cape Province
6. Empodium plicatum (Thunb.) Garside – Cape Province
7. Empodium veratrifolium (Willd.) M.F.Thomps. – Cape Province
