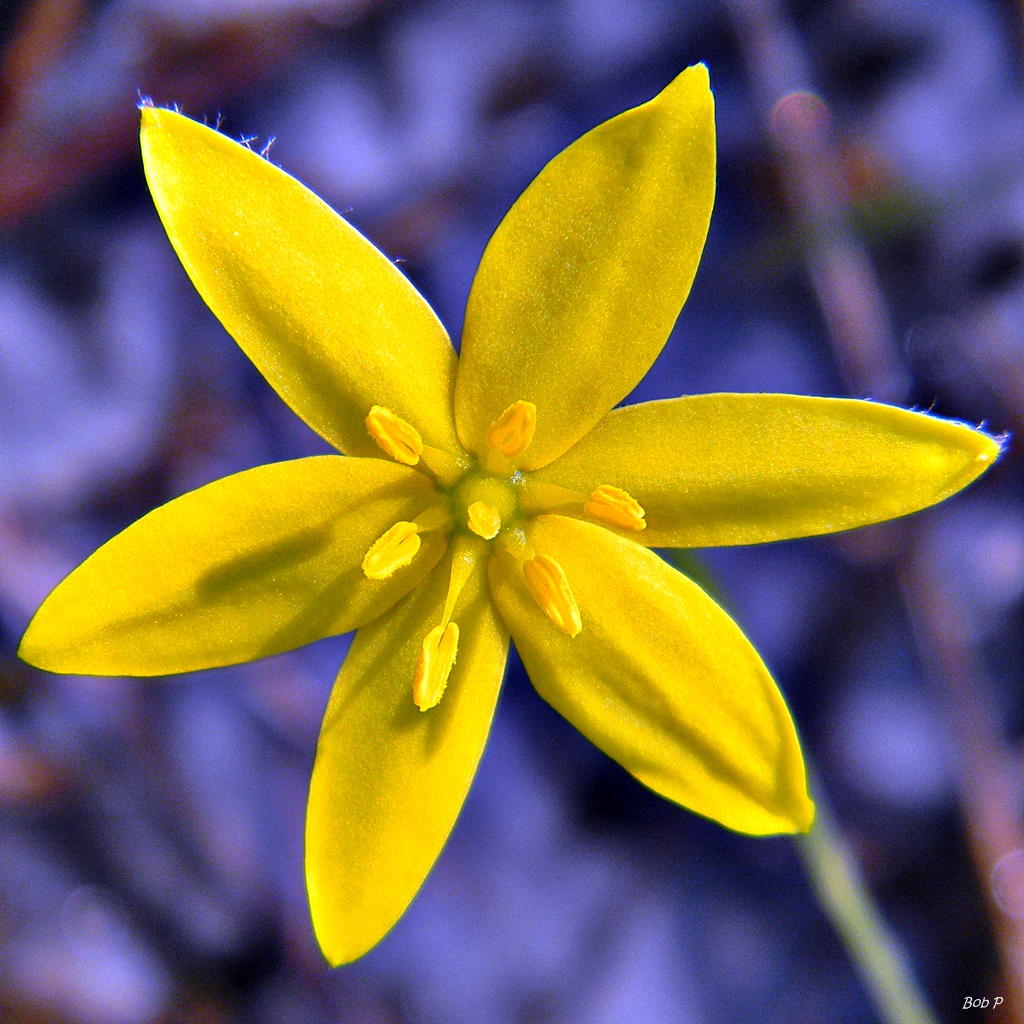
- Hypoxis juncea

Conservation status
- Apparently Secure (NatureServe)

Scientific classification
- Kingdom: Plantae
- Clade: Tracheophytes
- Clade: Angiosperms
- Clade: Monocots
- Order: Asparagales
- Family: Hypoxidaceae
- Genus: Hypoxis
- Species: H. juncea

Binomial name
- Hypoxis juncea Sm.

= Hypoxis juncea =

Fringed yellow star-grass

Species of flowering plant

Hypoxis juncea (commonly known as fringed yellow star-grass and rushy hypoxis) is a star-grass species with leaves that are so narrow as to be comparable to thread. It is not a true grass, despite the common name. It is found in the United States on coastal plains from Florida + Alabama to North Carolina. The species is a facultative wetland perennial forb.
