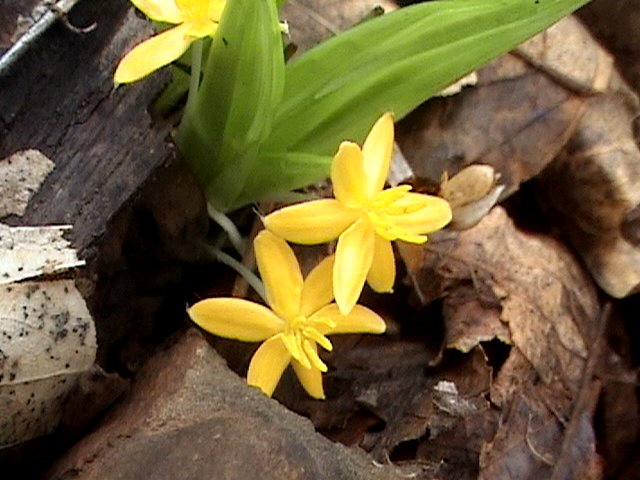
- Curculigo orchioides

Scientific classification
- Kingdom: Plantae
- Clade: Tracheophytes
- Clade: Angiosperms
- Clade: Monocots
- Order: Asparagales
- Family: Hypoxidaceae
- Genus: Curculigo; Gaertn. (1788)

Synonyms
- Aurota Raf. (1837); Franquevillea Zoll. ex Miq. (1859); Friedmannia Kocyan & Wiland (2016), nom. illeg.; Heliacme Ravenna (2003); Hypoxidia F.Friedmann (1985); Molineria Colla (1826); Neofriedmannia Kocyan & Wiland (2017)

= Curculigo =

Genus of flowering plants

Curculigo is a flowering plant genus in the family Hypoxidaceae, first described in 1788. It is widespread across tropical regions of Asia, Africa, Australia, and the Americas.

Curculin is a sweet protein that was discovered and isolated in 1990 from the fruit of Curculigo latifolia, a plant from Malaysia. Like miraculin, curculin exhibits taste-modifying activity; however, unlike miraculin, it also exhibits a sweet taste by itself. After consumption of curculin, water and sour solutions taste sweet. The plant is referred to locally as lembah or lumbah; English: 'weevil-wort'.

== Species ==
Plants of the World Online includes:

- Curculigo annamitica Gagnep. – Vietnam
- Curculigo breviscapa S.C.Chen – China (Guangxi, Guangdong)
- Curculigo capitulata (Lour.) Kuntze
- Curculigo conoc Gagnep. – Vietnam
- Curculigo crassifolia (Baker) Hook.f.
- Curculigo disticha Gagnep. – Vietnam
- Curculigo ensifolia R.Br. – Australia
- Curculigo erecta Lauterb. – Philippines, Sumatra, New Guinea, Solomon Islands
- Curculigo fabrei Hul
- Curculigo fakimensis (Odyuo, D.K.Roy & Khamdi) Christenh. & Byng
- Curculigo gracilis (Kurz) Wall. ex Hook.f.
- Curculigo janarthanamii R.D. Gore & S.P.Gaikwad – India
- Curculigo latifolia Dryand. ex W.T.Aiton
- Curculigo maharashtrensis M.R.Almeida & S.Yadav – Maharashtra
- Curculigo maheensis (F.Friedmann) Christenh. & Byng
- Curculigo oligantha (C.E.C.Fisch.) Bennet & Raizada
- Curculigo orchioides Gaertn. – China, Japan, Indian Subcontinent, Papuasia, Micronesia
- Curculigo pilosa (Schumach. & Thonn.) Engl. – tropical Africa, Madagascar
- Curculigo prainiana (Deb) Bennet & Raizada
- Curculigo racemosa Ridl. – Borneo
- Curculigo rhizophylla (Baker) T.Durand & Schinz
- Curculigo sabui S.P. Gaikwad & Gore – India
- Curculigo savantwadiensis M.R.Almeida & S.Yadav – Maharashtra
- Curculigo scorzonerifolia (Lam.) Baker – southern Mexico, Central America, West Indies, northern South America
- Curculigo seychellensis Bojer ex Baker – Seychelles
- Curculigo sinensis S.C.Chen – China (Yunnan)
- Curculigo tonkinensis Gagnep. – Vietnam
- Curculigo trichocarpa (Wight) Bennet & Raizada
