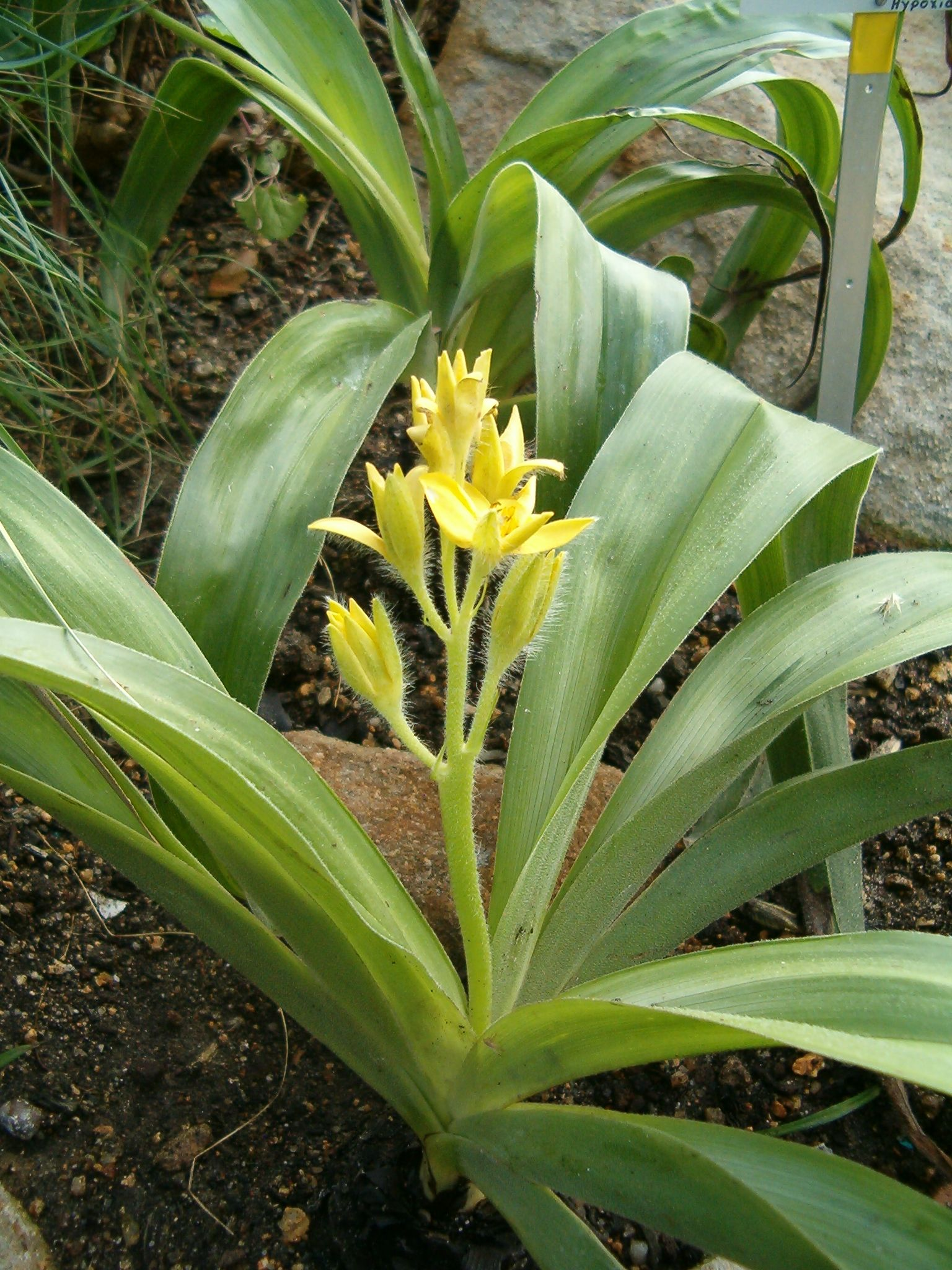
- Hypoxis hemerocallidea

Scientific classification
- Kingdom: Plantae
- Clade: Tracheophytes
- Clade: Angiosperms
- Clade: Monocots
- Order: Asparagales
- Family: Hypoxidaceae; R.Br.

Genera
- Curculigo Gaertn. (syn. Hypoxidia, Molineria); Empodium Salisb.; Hypoxis L.; Pauridia Harv.; Sinocurculigo Z.J.Liu, L.J.Chen & K.Wei Liu

= Hypoxidaceae =

Family of flowering plants

Hypoxidaceae is a family of flowering plants, placed in the order Asparagales of the monocots.

The APG IV system of 2016 (unchanged from the 1998, 2003, and 2009 versions) accepts this family. The family consists of five genera, with around 160 species.

The members of the family are small to medium herbs, with grass-like leaves and an invisible stem, modified into a corm or a rhizome. The flowers are born on leafless shoots, also called scapes. The flowers are trimerous, radially symmetric. The ovary is inferior, developing into a capsule or a berry.

== Uses ==
Curculin is a taste modifying sweet protein that was discovered from the fruit of a plant in this family (Curculigo latifolia). Consuming it causes water to taste sweet for a duration.
