= Australian Alps montane grasslands =

Ecoregion in Australia

Coordinates: 36°40′46.62″S 148°11′17.22″E

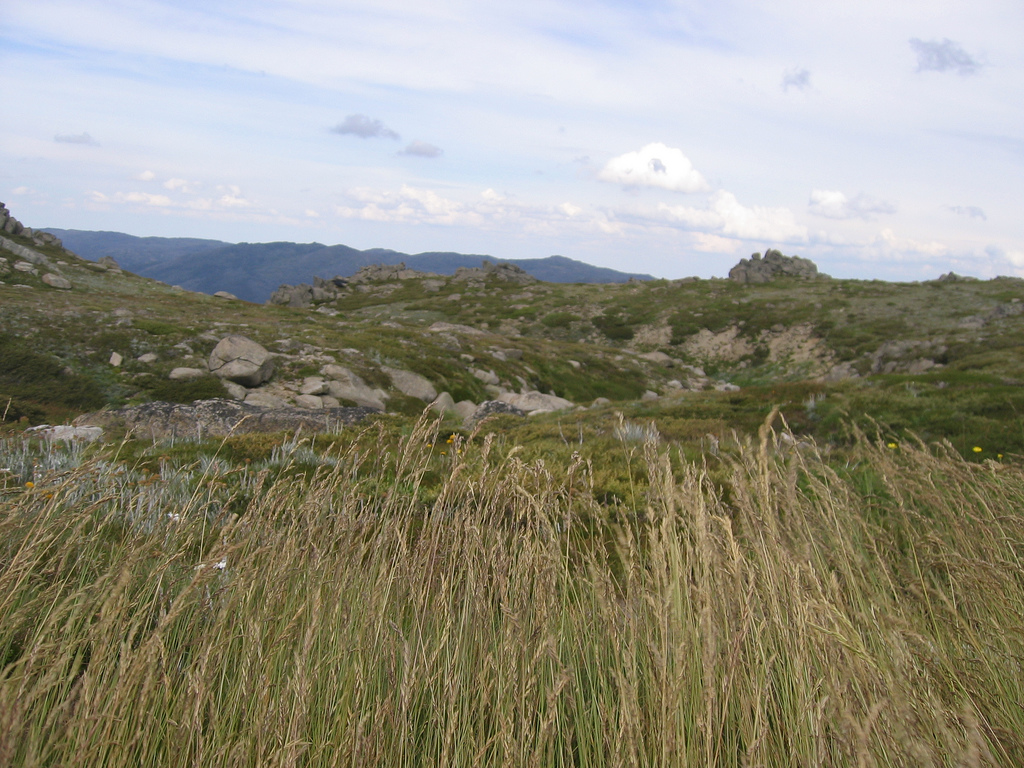
- Montane grassland at Kosciuszko National Park

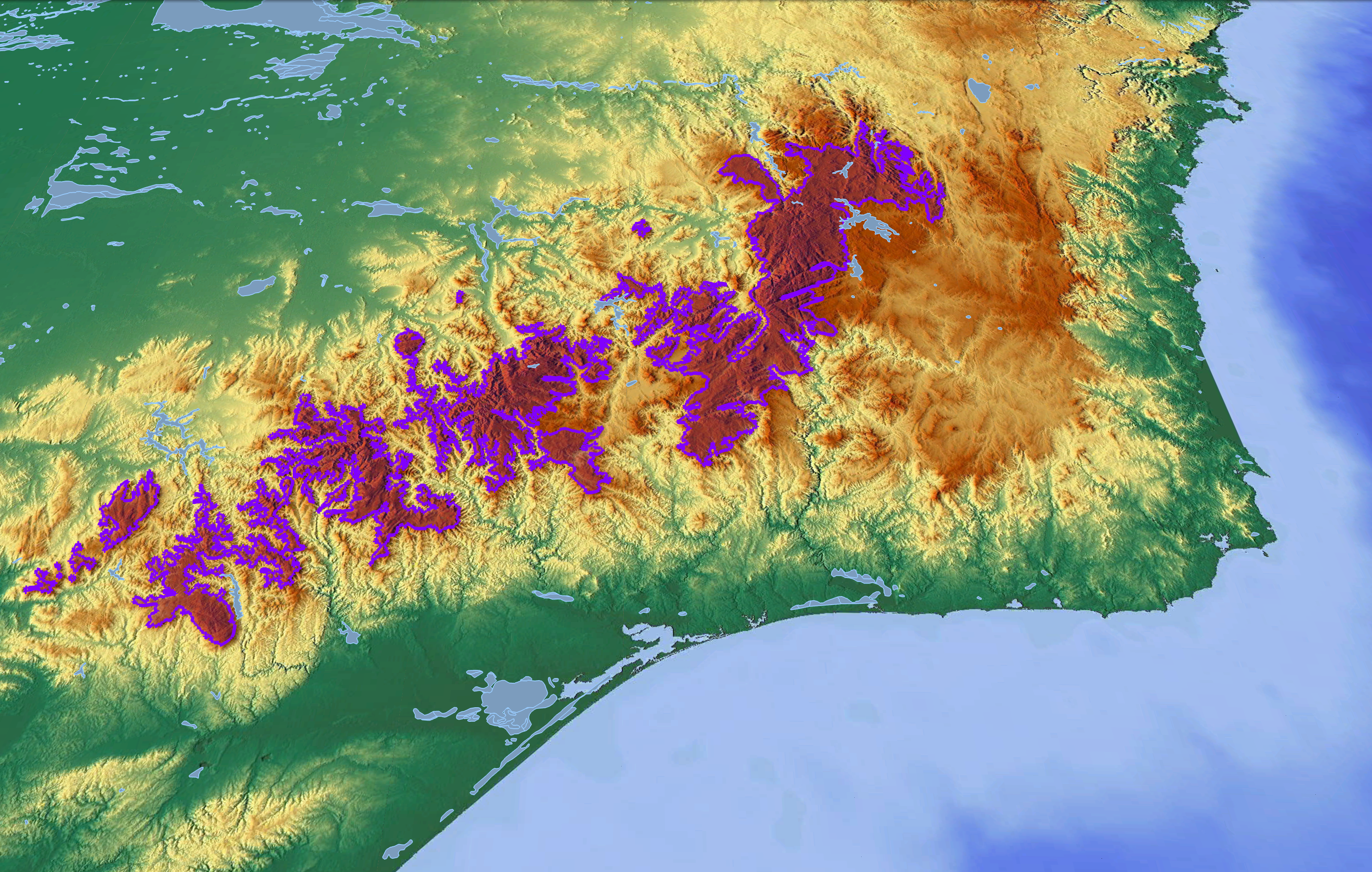
- Australian Alps Montane Grasslands (purple)

Ecology
- Realm: Australasian
- Biome: montane grasslands and shrublands
- Borders: Eastern Australian temperate forests; Southeast Australia temperate forests; Southern Tablelands Temperate Grassland; Lowland Grassy Woodland

Geography
- Area: 12,330 km^{2} (4,760 mi^{2})
- Country: Australia
- States: Australian Capital Territory; New South Wales; Victoria

Conservation
- Conservation status: Relatively stable/intact
- Protected: 7,888 km^{2} (64%)

The Australian Alps montane grasslands is a montane grassland ecoregion of south-eastern Australia, restricted to the montane regions above 1300 metres (the upper altitudinal limit of Eucalyptus pauciflora).

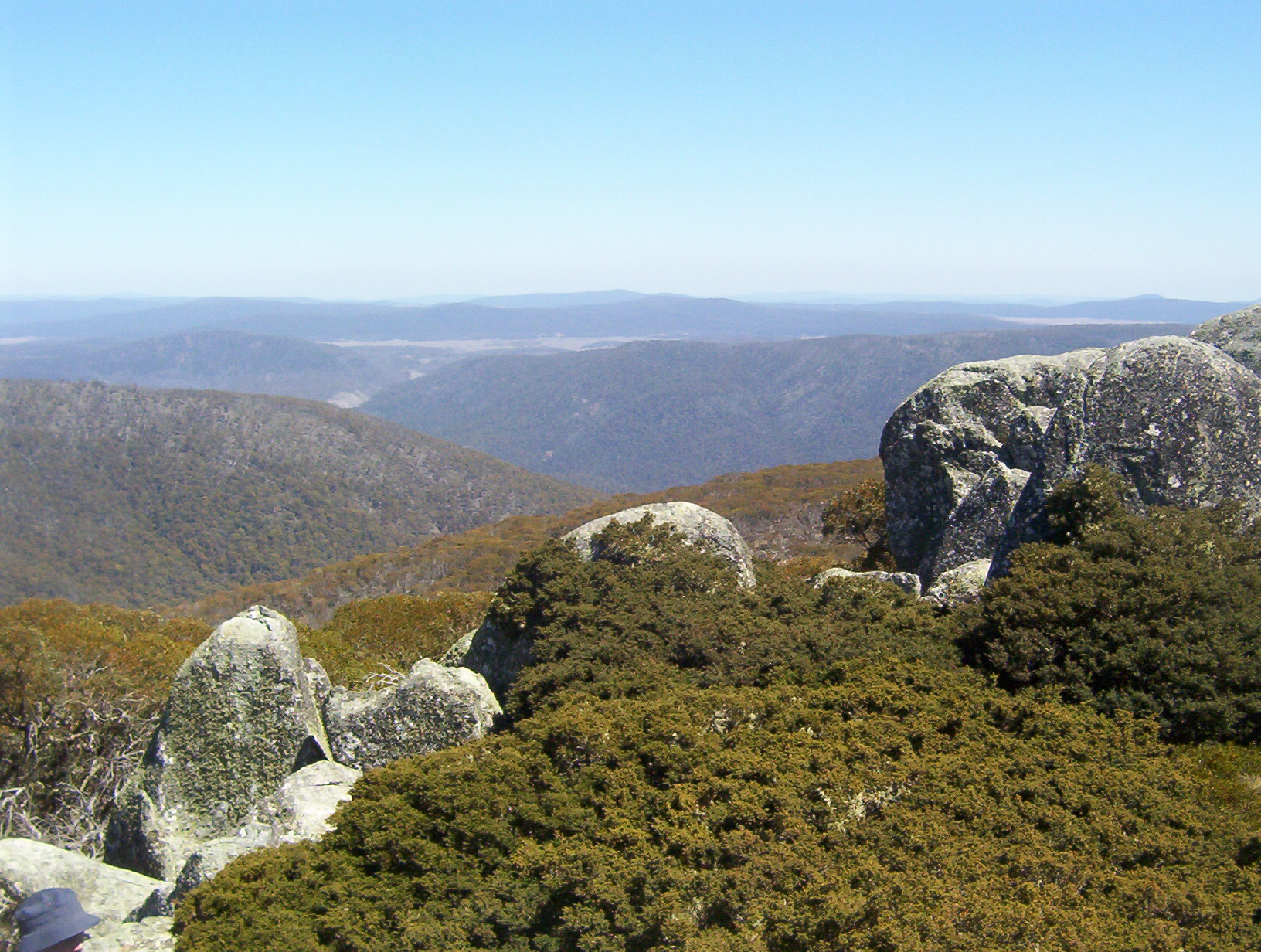
Mount Ginini in Namadgi National Park

== Location and description ==
The Australian Alps occupy less than 0.3% of the Australian landmass and run for 600 km from the Brindabella Ranges near Canberra along the borders of the Australian Capital Territory, New South Wales and Victoria almost as far as Melbourne. The highest point is Mount Kosciuszko (2,228 m) in the Snowy Mountains. On the Australian mainland these are the south-eastern section of the country's Great Dividing Range while there are also significant elements of montane grassland in Tasmania. These mountain areas are notable in Australia, which is mostly flat and dry, and the Alps receive almost a quarter of the country's rainfall and are the water source for almost half of the population. Winters are dark, cold and windy with snow on the ground, with Mount Kosciuszko for example only having 10 frost-free days per year.

On the mainland, the Australian Alps montane grasslands are surrounded at lower elevations by the Southeast Australia temperate forests ecoregion.

== Flora ==
The montane grasslands are a mixed habitat of grassland, heath and bog that is home to a rich collection of Alpine and other plants adapted to the cold climate, snow and harsh dry winters. The ecoregion can be sub-categorised in to montane (between 1,100 m and 1,400 m), subalpine (between 1,400 m and 1,850 m), and alpine (normally above 1,850 m) bands. At lower elevations a number of different types of eucalyptus species including mountain ash '(Eucalyptus regnans) grow on the rich soils of the mountain valleys and alpine ash (Eucalyptus delagatensis) on the slopes. Meanwhile, the trees of the subalpine elevations are snow gum (Eucalyptus pauciflora)and black sallee (Eucalyptus stellulata) with a ground cover of heath shrubs. The tree line is between 1600 and 1800 m and above that the alpine flora consists predominantly of species of Poa (snow grass), usually associated with closed and open shrublands of orites, Grevillea, Prostanthera, and Hovea. At the highest alpine elevations, these mosaics may give way to a feldmark or, in zones where snow lies into the summer months, to a snow patch community. Sphagnum bog communities of Sphagnum cristatum and Empodisma minus (spreading rope-rush) occur in stream beds or other low-lying areas.

The occurrence of grasslands represents an ecological climax condition, the culmination of a cycle of colonisation of bare ground by woody shrubs which provide protection for seedlings of grass species. The shrubs senesce after 40 to 50 years, leaving a closed canopy.

== Fauna ==
Although this is a harsh environment there is much endemic wildlife in the Alps including the chameleon-like Alpine thermocolour grasshopper (Kosciuscola tristis), mountain pygmy possum (Burramys parvus) and the corroboree frog (Pseudophryne corroboree). One particularly restricted range species is the Baw Baw frog (Philoria frosti) which only lives on the Baw Baw Plateau in Victoria. The larger mammals of the lower elevations include red-necked wallaby (Macropus rufogriseus), swamp wallaby (Wallabia bicolor), common wombat (Vombatus ursinus), tiger quoll (Dasyurus maculatus), short-beaked echidna (Tachyglossus aculeatus) and platypus (Ornithorhynchus anatinus).

== Threats and preservation ==
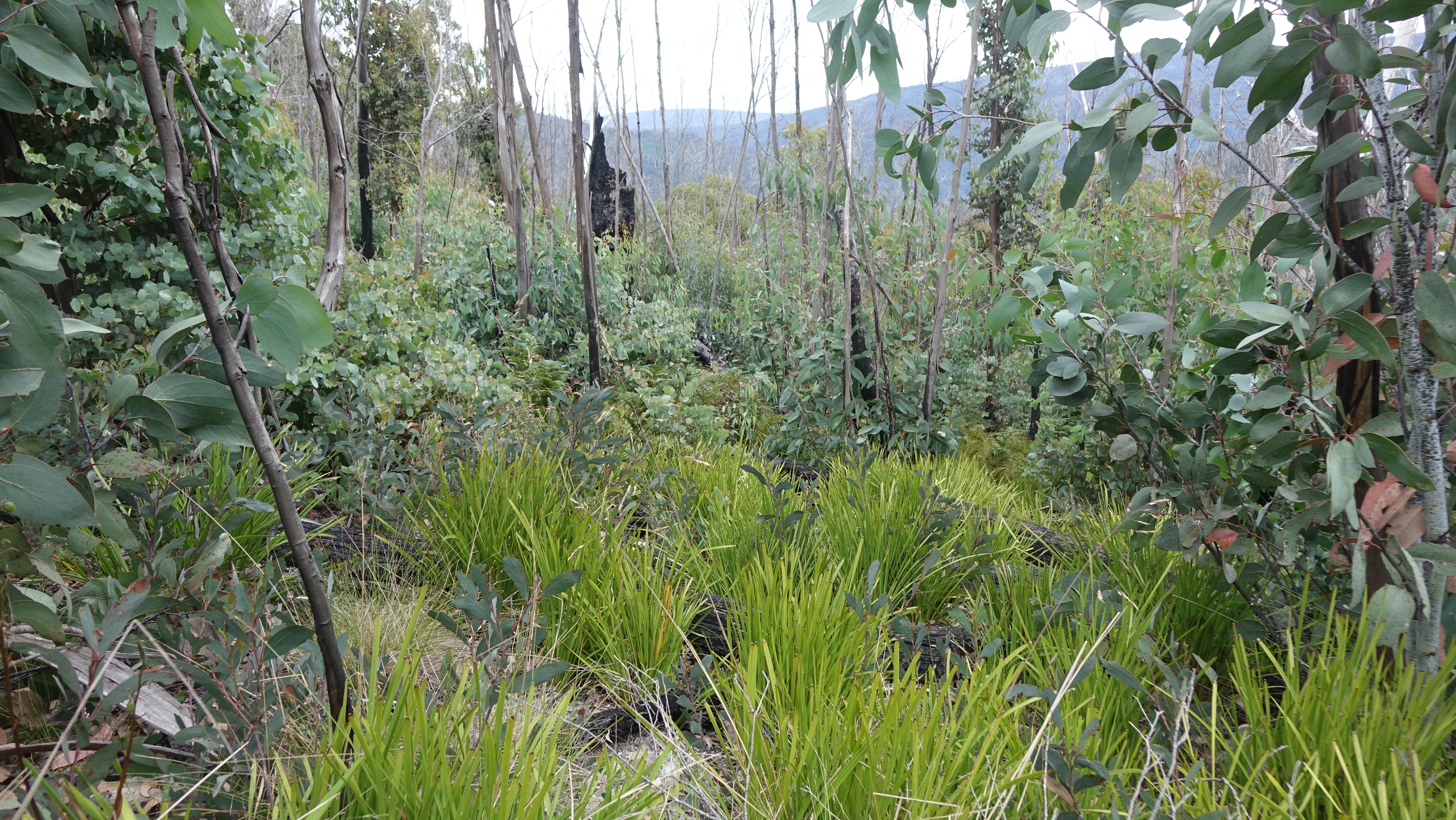
Montane Eucalyptus regeneration post fire. Photo taken in Carey State Forest, (next to Alpine National Park)

This ecoregion is generally thought to have experienced long periods of minimal disturbance prior to European settlement. Since the nineteenth century, grazing and an increased incidence of fire resulted in a reduction in range condition, and extensive damage to bog communities, from which plant communities have been slow to recover. Fires have become increasingly common in south-eastern Australia during periods of extended hot, dry weather. Numerous studies indicate that fire frequency and severity are likely to increase in the coming century due to climate change.

The Alps have long been protected as national parkland in order to preserve the water sources and most of the region is now contained in large contiguous National Parks. These include Brindabella and Namadgi National Park and Bimberi and Scabby Range Nature Reserves near Canberra, Kosciuszko in New South Wales, and Alpine and Snowy River National Parks and the Avon Wilderness Park in Victoria. This parkland which does suffer litter, trampling of wildlife and other damage associated with tourism including the clearance of parkland to create ski resorts.
