= Eastern Australian temperate forests =

Ecoregion in Australia

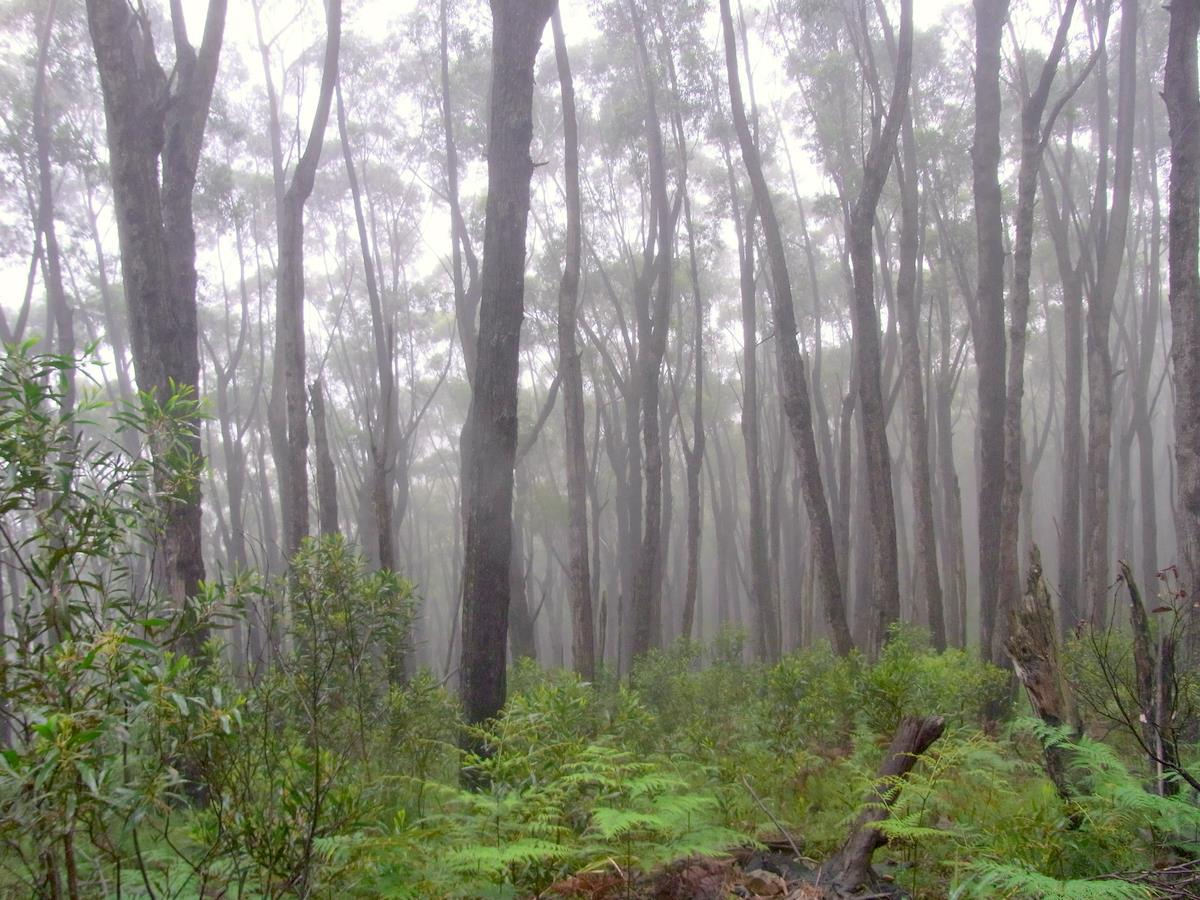
- Misty Deua Forest in the South Coast, near Batemans Bay.

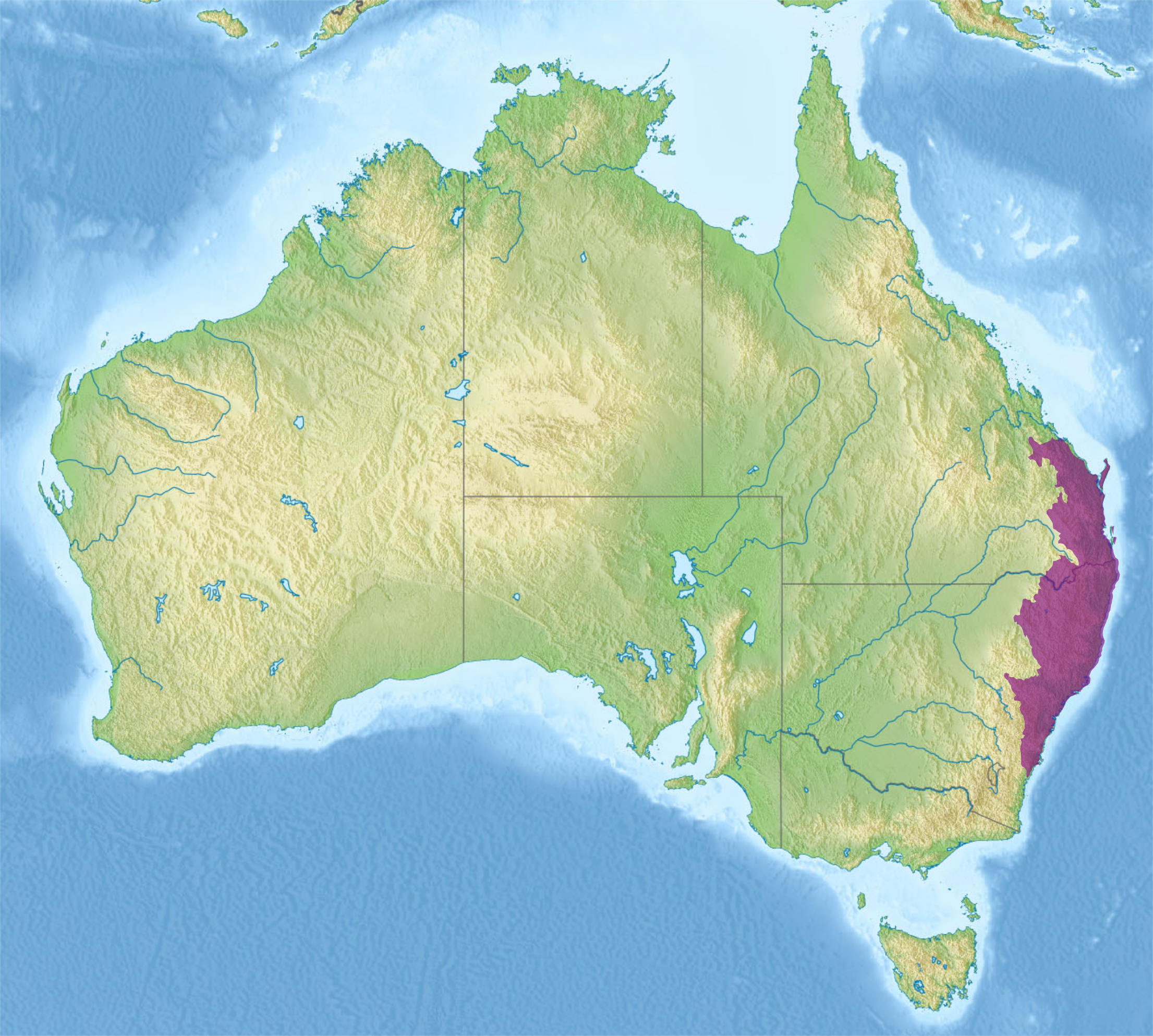
- Ecoregion territory (in purple)

Ecology
- Biome: Temperate broadleaf and mixed forests
- Borders: Brigalow tropical savanna; Southeast Australia temperate forests, Southeast Australia temperate savanna
- Bird species: 380
- Mammal species: 87

Geography
- Area: 222,100 km^{2} (85,800 mi^{2})
- Country: Australia
- States: Australian Capital Territory; New South Wales, Queensland

Conservation
- Habitat loss: 32.821%
- Protected: 16.55%

The Eastern Australian temperate forests, or the Eastern Australian temperate and subtropical forests, is a broad ecoregion of open forest on uplands (typically on the Great Dividing Range) starting from the east coast of New South Wales in the South Coast to southern Queensland, Australia. Although dry sclerophyll and wet sclerophyll eucalyptus forests predominate within this ecoregion, a number of distinguishable rainforest communities are present as well.

Many systematic National and State Parks are distributed throughout New South Wales and Queensland, although the representation of habitats varies throughout the ecoregion. In some areas, eucalyptus woodlands and dry forests have been cleared for urban development or to enhance grazing. Before Europeans first arrived to Australia, the Border Ranges had one of the largest rainforests in Australia.

== Geography ==
This ecoregion covers an area between Australia's east coast and the Great Dividing Range, starting just above Eden, New South Wales in the South Coast, which includes (parts of) the Blue Mountains to the west Sydney, and ending in south Queensland's Border Ranges. The Sydney metropolitan area is transitional with regions such as the greater west (or the Cumberland Plain Woodland) being virtually excluded from this biome since it predominantly contains dry sclerophyll, grassy woodlands and thus the region's vegetation community will be more similar to Temperate grasslands (i.e. savannahs). Though pockets of forested areas in Sydney, such as those in The Hills Shire to the north and Sutherland Shire to the south, which are relatively wet, do have regions within them that are part of Eastern Australian temperate forests (such as the Sydney Turpentine-Ironbark Forest and Blue Gum High Forest).

Eucalyptus communities meandering the coast in southern Queensland and northern New South Wales are usually wet sclerophyll wet forests, ranging from 30 percent to 70 percent closed canopy cover, with the understorey containing small broadleaved trees, vines, ferns and shrubs. Both wet and dry sclerophyll forests are the most predominant vegetation communities in the coastal corridor of south-eastern Australia, and would receive less rainfall than the rainforest communities.

Subtropical rainforest are complex closed-forests that are the most developed community in New South Wales, growing in warm, fecund sites having rainfall higher than 1,300 mm per year. They are predominantly found between the border of Queensland and New South Wales, near the Gold Coast, Coffs Harbour and Byron Bay.

Dry rainforests are low closed forests with irregular canopy that occur in sites with lower rainfall, ranging from 600 mm to 1,100 mm annual rainfall, generally in parts of the Blue Mountains and also near Narooma and Moruya in the south coast. Dry rainforest was distributed in southeastern Queensland where it occupied about half a million hectares, though it has now been broadly cleared for agriculture. There is a small dry rainforest community in southwestern Sydney, near Abbotsbury. Western Vine Thickets, another dry closed forest biome is found inland of New South Wales near Moree and Narrabri.

Warm temperate rainforest are closed forests with far less diversity than the dry or subtropical rainforests, growing on low-nutrient soils. It is found scattered in the Blue Mountains, Central Coast, North Coast, the Illawarra escarpment near Wollongong and in isolated pockets in the South Coast. Cool temperate forests are found in the highlands in the northern areas of New South Wales. The Blue Mountains and Southern Highlands Basalt Forests and the Illawarra-Shoalhaven subtropical rainforest are a prominent forest community within the ecoregion.

The rainforest communities of this region exhibit ecological relations to other regions: the cool temperate rainforest is similar to the biome found in Tasmania, the warm temperate rainforest has links to the North Island of New Zealand, and the subtropical and dry regions are also found up north in the Queensland tropical rain forests ecoregion. The Blue Mountains area has over 90 eucalypt taxa, or 13% of the global dispersion.

=== Biome groupings ===
The ecoregion has a variety of vegetation communities in its scope:

- Eucalyptus open forests (dry and wet sclerophyll forests)
  - Eucalyptus tall open forest
  - Eucalyptus open forest
  - Eucalyptus low open forest
  - Eucalyptus open grassy woodlands
- Closed forests (rainforests and vine thickets)
  - Subtropical rainforest
  - Littoral rainforest
  - Dry rainforest
  - Warm temperate/deciduous rainforest (southern and northern group)
  - Cool temperate rainforest
  - Western Vine Thickets

To note, the open eucalypt forest is a broad, crescent-shaped vegetation community that is found from Gladstone, Queensland to as far as Quorn, South Australia in the southwest, which incorporates Southeast Australia temperate forests in southern Victoria and the Mediterranean woodlands in western Victoria and eastern South Australia.

== Climate ==
These are areas of eucalyptus forest on sandstone plateau, with smaller sections of cliffs, steep gorges with rainforest vegetation and sandy heath on the coasts. The climate is oceanic to the south and humid subtropical to the north. In the central areas of the Blue Mountains, rainfall averages from 1,100 to 1,400 mm annually. Climate in the coastal regions is humid, with excessive rainfall (1200 mm to 1600 mm a year). Rainfall decreases as one moves inland to the New England region with Armidale receiving around 800 mm of rain each year on average. Winters in that city are cold and wet and higher elevations receive snowfall most years.

Further north in the Border Ranges, monthly summer temperatures vary from 21.5C maximum to 19.7C minimum. Corresponding winter temperatures from Mount Tamborine in the Border Ranges vary from 17.8C maximum to 12.3C minimum. Throughout the ecoregion, rainfall is concentrated in the summer. Towards the north of the ecoregion rainfall is lower (750 mm to 1100 mm per year) and more seasonal.

== Flora ==
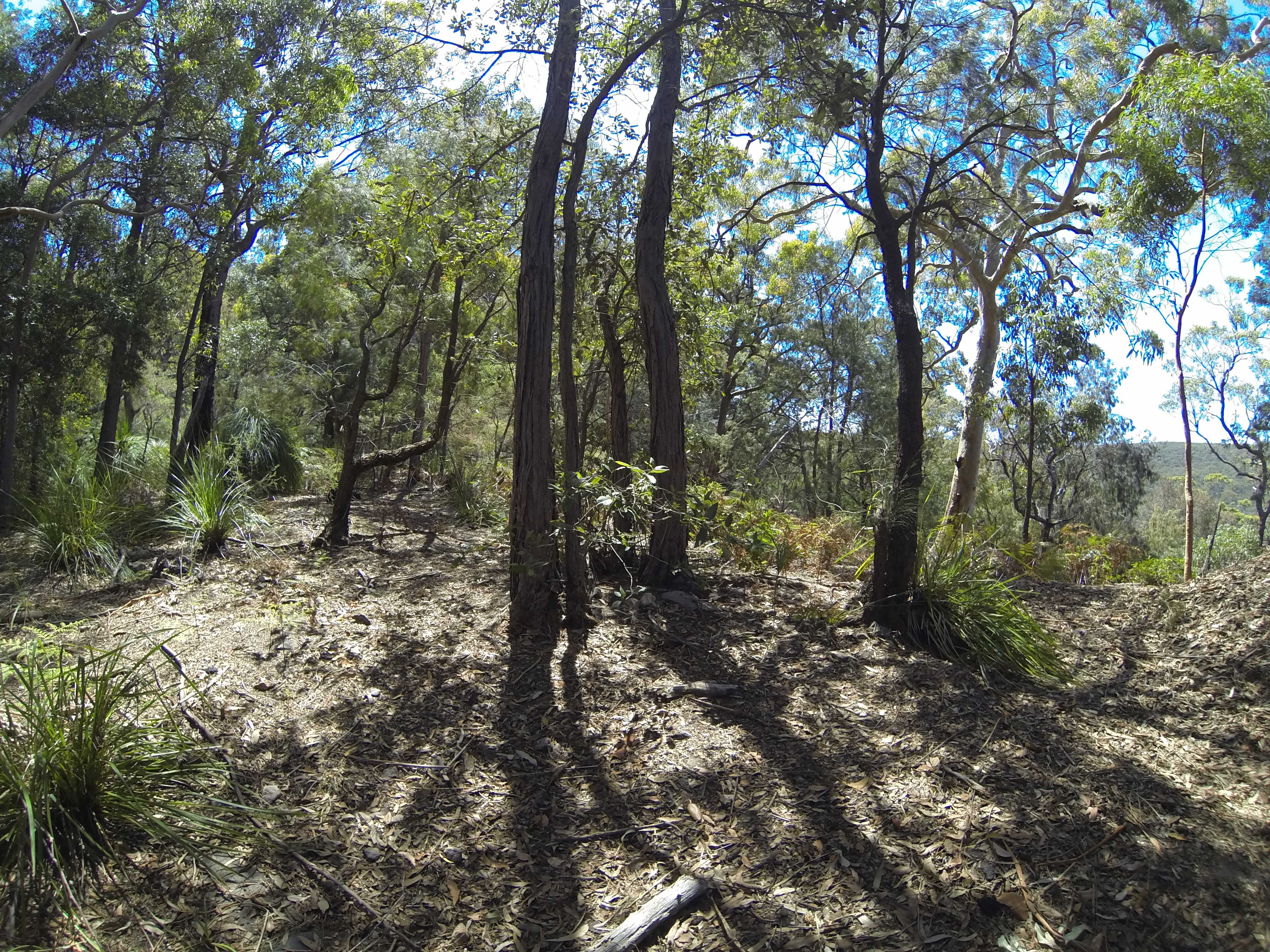
Brisbane Water National Park in the Central Coast near Gosford

The dominant forest is peppermint eucalyptus trees, indeed it was the moisture from these trees which was originally thought to cause the blue mist that gave the mountains their name. Shrublands, shrubby woodlands (heaths), and affiliated sandplain vegetation are typical of the region's coastal area. The shrub species include, Epacridaceae, Myrtaceae, Rutaceae, Fabaceae, Proteaceae, and Cyperaceae. The Border Ranges is home to more than 1,200 vascular plants.

A variety of eucalyptus trees dominate areas of this large ecoregion, including: in southern Queensland and northern New South Wales (such as in around such as the Northern Tablelands) - tallowwood (Eucalyptus microcorys), blackbutt (Eucalyptus pilularis), brush box (Lophostemon confertus), flooded gum (Eucalyptus grandis), and Gympie messmate (Eucalyptus cloeziana); southern New South Wales - Sydney blue gum (Eucalyptus saligna), the grey ironbark (Eucalyptus paniculata), and blackbutt; and on the New South Wales coast a stringybark (Eucalyptus eugenioides). Trees in the warm temperate forests include coachwood (Ceratopetalum apetalum), sassafras (Doryphora sassafras), and lillypilly (Acmena smithii) Typical trees in cool temperate forests include Eucryphia moorei and Antarctic beech (Nothofagus moorei).

There are particularly rich collections of endemic plants in a number of areas: the eucalyptus of the Blue Mountains; the rainforests of Border Ranges area in the McPherson Range including Mount Warning, Nightcap National Park, and Lamington National Park including Binna Burra; and the sand dunes of World Heritage Site Fraser Island and the Great Sandy National Park of southern Queensland. There are well-known areas of rainforest protected as the Gondwana Rainforests of Australia, containing distinct areas of subtropical rainforest in New South Wales, dry rainforest of southern Queensland (although most of this has been cleared for agriculture and pine plantations) and warm temperate rainforest south of Sydney. Finally the coasts are covered with shrubs, heath and other sand dune vegetation.

== Fauna ==
Local wildlife includes velvet worms and koalas, while the birds of the forest include kookaburra kingfishers, gang-gang cockatoos, crimson rosellas and striated thornbills and a number of threatened birds including red goshawk (Erythrotriorchis radiatus), swift parrot (Lathamus discolor), regent honeyeater (Xanthomyza phrygia), Albert's lyrebird (Menura alberti), and eastern bristlebird (Dasyornis brachypterus). Overall, upwards of 60 reptiles, 65 mammals, and 275 birds have been transcribed in the Blue Mountains. The broad-headed snake and the stuttering frog also exist in the region.

== List of national parks within the ecoregion ==
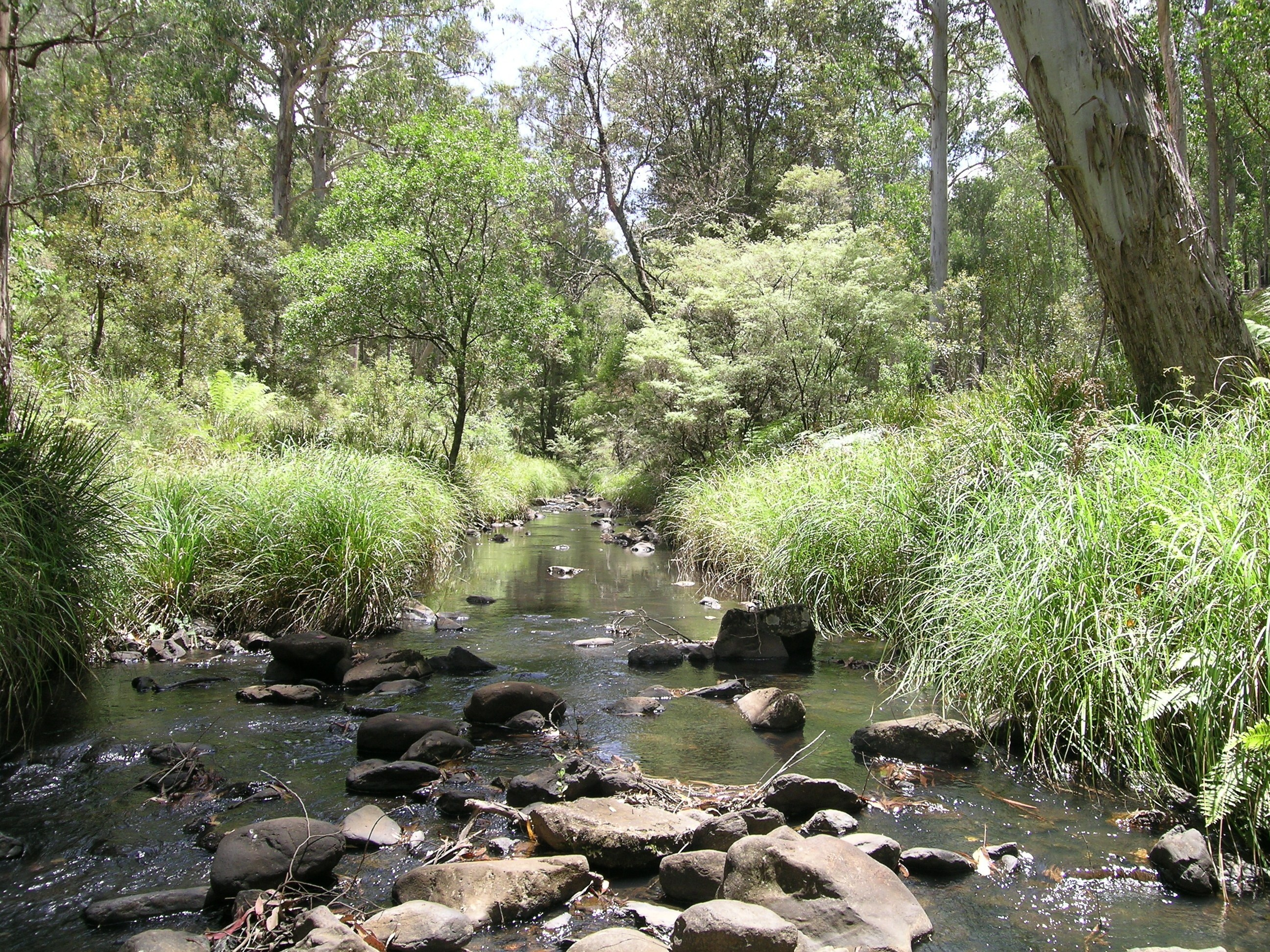
A stream in Werrikimbe National Park in the Mid North Coast of NSW.

These parks are listed in a north to south order, starting from northern NSW down to the south coast of NSW (to note, not all plant communities within these parks have temperate forests, as some would grade to Mediterranean woodlands and/or subtropical forests, depending on the vicinity):

- Border Ranges National Park
- Washpool National Park
- Willi Willi National Park
- Werrikimbe National Park
- Cottan-Bimbang National Park
- Barrington Tops National Park
- Myall Lakes National Park
- Brisbane Water National Park
- Berowra Valley National Park
- Ku-ring-gai Chase National Park
- Dharug National Park
- Blue Mountains National Park
- Royal National Park
- Marramarra National Park
- Dharawal National Park
- Budderoo National Park
- Budawang National Park
- Monga National Park
- Deua National Park
- Wadbilliga National Park
- Mimosa Rocks National Park
- Wadbilliga National Park

== See also ==
- Sclerophyll
- Blue Gum High Forest
- Sydney Turpentine-Ironbark Forest
- Ecology of Sydney
