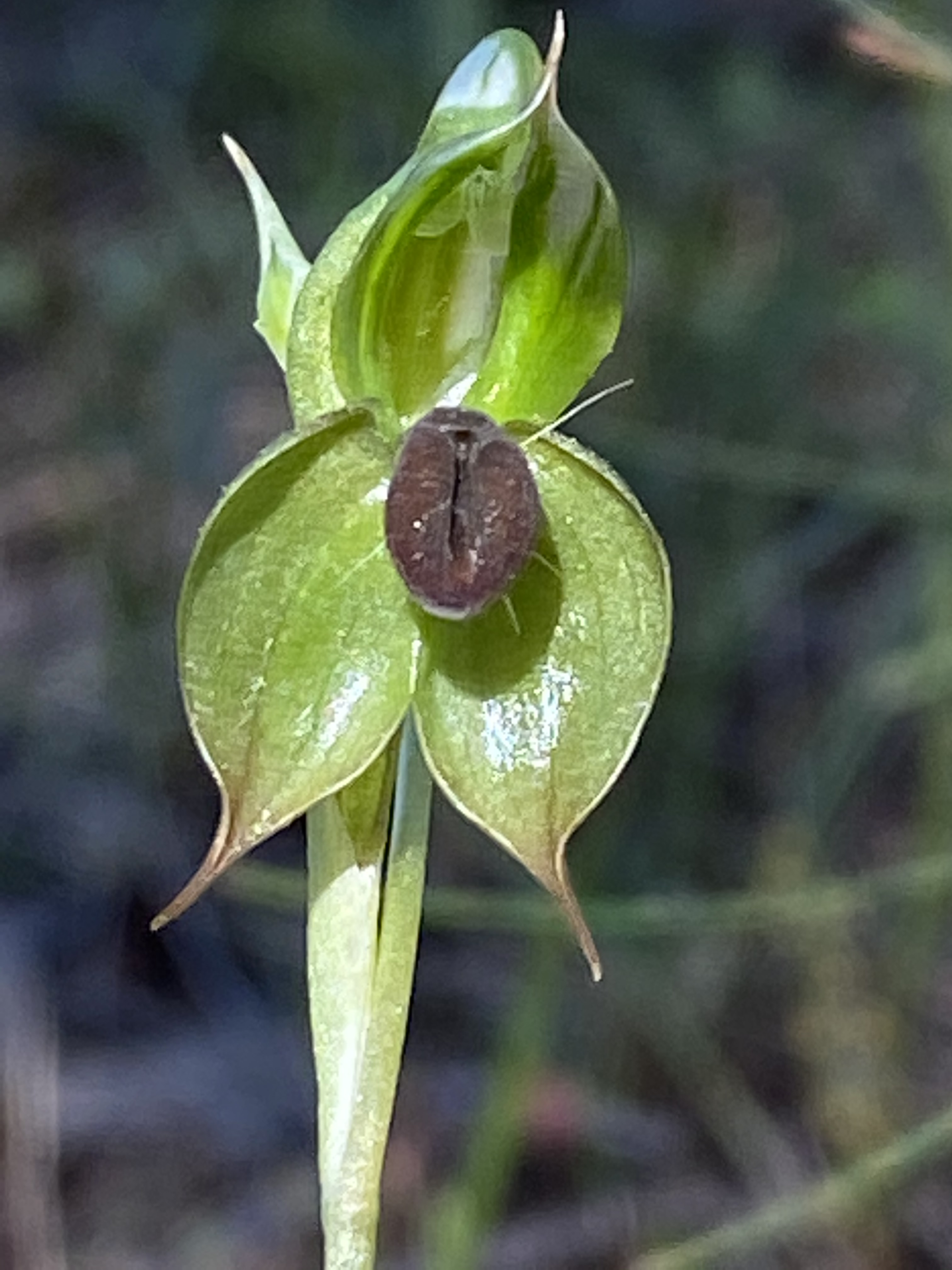
- In bushland at Albion Park

Conservation status
- Endangered (EPBC Act)

Scientific classification
- Kingdom: Plantae
- Clade: Tracheophytes
- Clade: Angiosperms
- Clade: Monocots
- Order: Asparagales
- Family: Orchidaceae
- Subfamily: Orchidoideae
- Tribe: Cranichideae
- Genus: Pterostylis
- Species: P. gibbosa

Binomial name
- Pterostylis gibbosa R.Br.

Synonyms
- Oligochaetochilus gibbosa Szlach. orth. var.; Oligochaetochilus gibbosus (R.Br.) Szlach.; Pterostylis ceriflora Blackmore & Clemesha; Pterostylis gibbosa R.Br. subsp. gibbosa

= Pterostylis gibbosa =

Illawarra rustyhood

Species of orchid

Pterostylis gibbosa, commonly known as Illawarra rustyhood, or Illawarra greenhood, is a plant in the orchid family Orchidaceae and is endemic to New South Wales. It has a rosette of leaves at its base and up to nine bright green flowers with translucent "windows", relatively wide lateral sepals with short-pointed tips and a dark, fleshy, insect-like labellum.

== Description ==
Pterostylis gibbosa, is a terrestrial, perennial, deciduous, herb with an underground tuber. It has a rosette of between four and seven egg-shaped leaves 15–35 mm (0.6–1 in) long and 8–15 mm (0.3–0.6 in) wide. Flowering plants have a rosette at the base of the flowering spike but the leaves are usually withered by flowering time. Up to nine bright green flowers with translucent panels and 20–23 mm (0.8–0.9 in) long, 11–13 mm (0.4–0.5 in) wide are borne on a flowering spike 150–450 mm (6–20 in) tall. The flowers lean forward and there are three to six stem leaves wrapped around the flowering spike. The dorsal sepal and petals form a hood or "galea" over the column with the dorsal sepal having a narrow tip 2–3 mm (0.08–0.1 in) long. The lateral sepals turn downwards, wider than the galea and which taper to narrow, brownish tips 2–3 mm (0.08–0.1 in) long. The labellum is fleshy, dark brown and insect-like, about 5 mm (0.2 in) long and 3–4 mm (0.1–0.2 in) wide with a channel along its mid-line. The "head" end is thick and has many short hairs and the "body" has four to eight longer hairs on each side. Flowering occurs from August to November.

== Taxonomy and naming ==
Pterostylis gibbosa was first formally described in 1810 by Robert Brown and the description was published in Prodromus Florae Novae Hollandiae et Insulae Van Diemen. The specific epithet (gibbosa) is a Latin word meaning "very humped" or "crooked".

== Distribution and habitat ==
Illawarra rustyhood grows in forest with grasses in scattered populations in the Hunter, Illawarra and Shoalhaven regions. It is no longer found on the Cumberland Plain where it was first collected.

== Conservation ==
Pterostylis gibbosa is listed as "endangered" under the Australian Government Environment Protection and Biodiversity Conservation Act 1999. The main threats to the species are urbanisation, grazing by domestic stock, weed invasion and inappropriate fire regimes.
