= Lowland Grassy Woodland =

Ecological community in the south coast of New South Wales

Lowland Grassy Woodland in the South East Corner
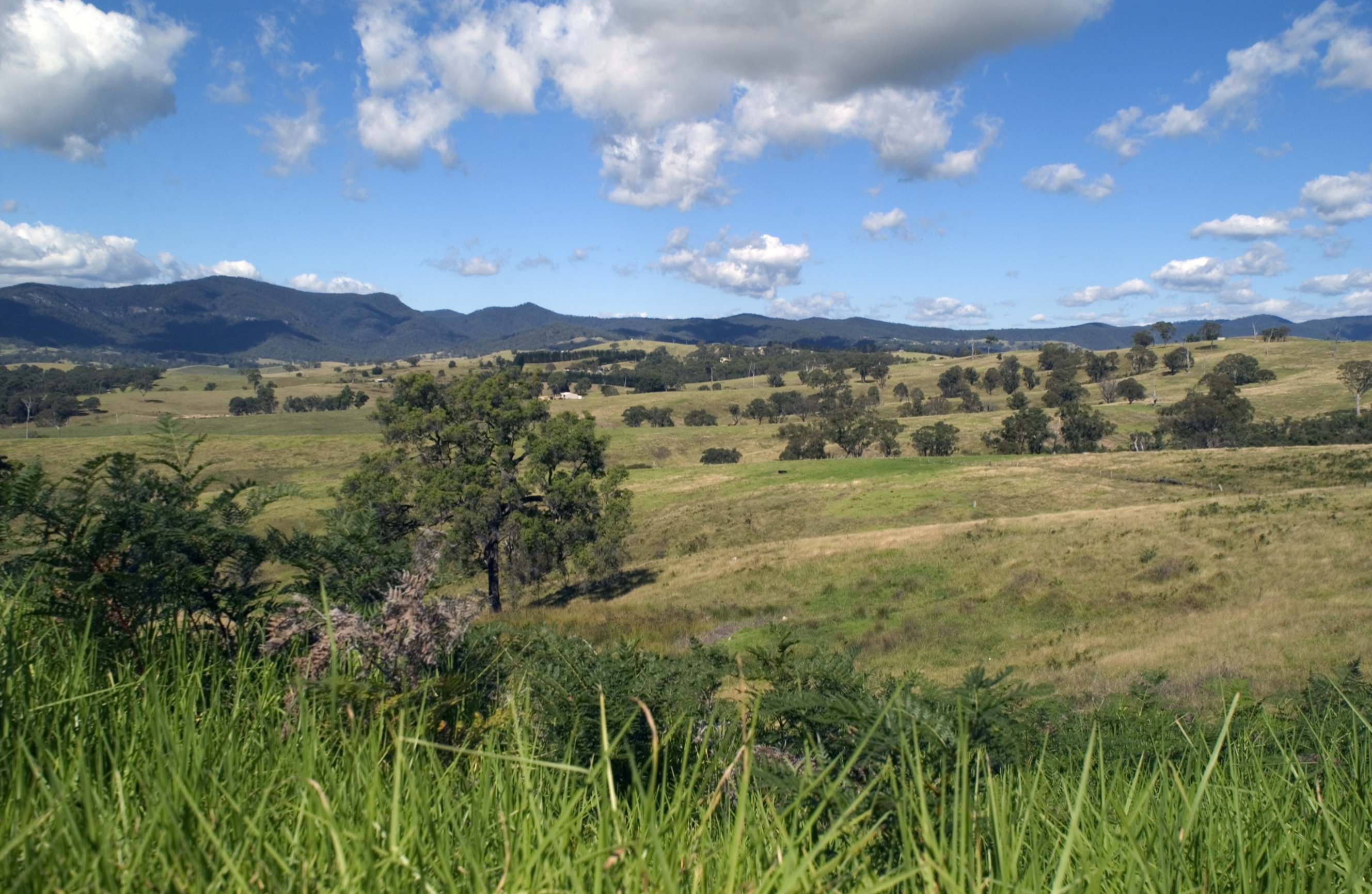
- Bega Valley

Ecology
- Realm: Australasia
- Biome: Temperate grasslands, savannas, and shrublands
- Borders: Southern Highlands Shale Forest and Woodland; Illawarra-Shoalhaven subtropical rainforest; Australian Alps montane grasslands

Geography
- Area: 0.1 km^{2} (0.039 mi^{2})
- Country: Australia
- Elevation: 10–500 metres (33–1,640 ft)
- Coordinates: 35.2°S 150.43°E
- Climate type: Oceanic climate (Cfb)
- Soil types: Clay

The Lowland Grassy Woodland, or the Illawarra and South Coast Lowland Grassy Woodland is a grassland-savannah community mostly found in the South Coast region of New South Wales, Australia. Stretching from the southern parts of the Illawarra in the north to the South East Corner in the south, it is an endangered ecological community that lies in a rain shadow area.

== Geography ==
The community lies in an area that receives less rainfall than the elevated terrain that partly encircle them, with mean annual rainfall generally in the range of 700 to 1,100 mm (28 to 43 in). The community sits on granitic substrates (e.g. adamellites, granites, granodiorites, gabbros, etc.) but may also be found on locally precipitous sites and on acid volcanic, alluvial and fine-grained sedimentary substrates. They generally consist of an open tree canopy, a near-uninterrupted groundcover dominated by grasses and herbs, sometimes with stratums of shrubs and/or small trees. The bioregion incorporates: Bega Dry Grass Forest and Candelo Dry Grass Forest. The community also forms part of the broader Coastal Valley Grassy Woodlands vegetation class.

The ecoregion is found in the Bega Valley, Eurobodalla and Palerang Local Government Areas, with major presence to the west of Batemans Bay, close to Moruya, in the Araluen valley, Cobargo, Candelo, the Towamba Valley and near Tanja. The remaining environment of the community is gravely fragmented, with more than 95% of surviving patches estimated to be less than 10 ha.

== Ecology ==
The grassy woodland is dominated by Eucalyptus tereticornis, Eucalyptus globoidea, Angophora floribunda, Eucalyptus melliodora, Eucalyptus pauciflora, Eucalyptus baueriana, Eucalyptus bosistoana, Eucalyptus maidenii and Eucalyptus viminalis. The understorey frequently features small trees like, Acacia mearnsii, Acacia implexa, Exocarpos cupressiformis and a shrub layer that features, Bursaria spinosa, Cassinia spp. and Ozothamnus diosmifolius.

The groundcover features, Themeda australis, Microlaena stipoides and Eragrostis leptostachya, in addition to forbs such as Dichondra repens, Desmodium varians, Hydrocotyle laxiflora, Hypericum gramineum, Glycine clandestina and Cheilanthes sieberi.
