= Southeast Australia temperate forests =

Terrestrial ecoregion in Australia

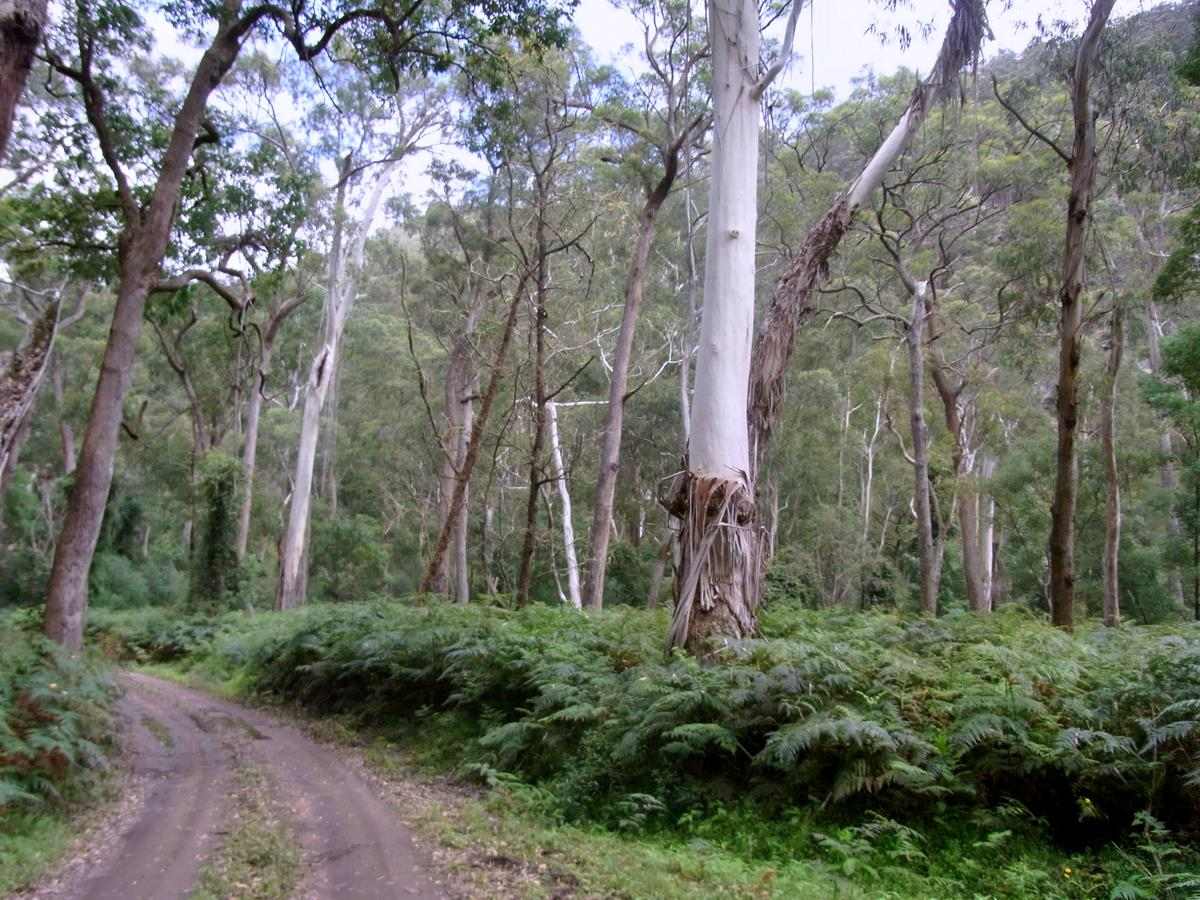
- Eucalyptus woodland in Wadbilliga National Park

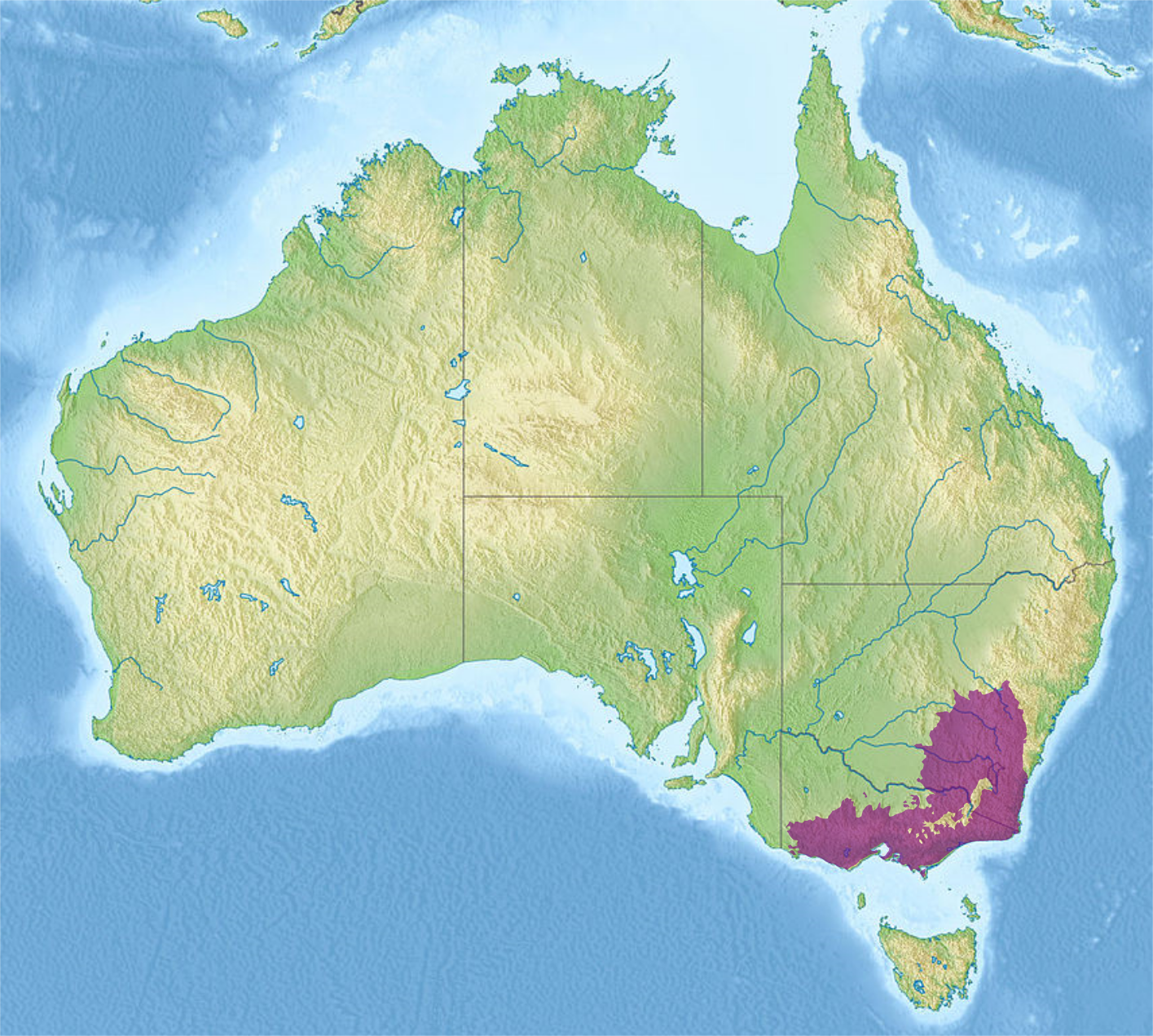
- Ecoregion territory (in purple)

Ecology
- Realm: Australasian
- Biome: temperate broadleaf and mixed forests
- Borders: List: Australian Alps montane grasslands; Eastern Australian temperate forests; Murray-Darling woodlands and mallee; Naracoorte woodlands; Southeast Australia temperate savanna

Geography
- Area: 272,200 km^{2} (105,100 mi^{2})
- Country: Australia
- States: Australian Capital Territory; New South Wales; Victoria
- Coordinates: 34.6°S 147.95°E

Conservation
- Conservation status: Critical/endangered
- Protected: 12.6%

The Southeast Australia temperate forests is a temperate broadleaf and mixed forests ecoregion of south-eastern Australia. It includes the temperate lowland forests of southeastern Australia, at the southern end of the Great Dividing Range. Vegetation ranges from wet forests along the coast to dry forests and woodlands inland.

== Geography ==
The ecoregion covers most of the state of Victoria, and extends into southeastern New South Wales. It includes the coastal plain and the drier western slope of the Great Dividing Range. It surrounds the Australian Alps montane grasslands, which lie above 1200 in the highest portion of the Great Dividing Range.

The northern portion of the ecoregion, lying north of the Great Dividing Range and the Grampians, is in the basin of the Murray River. The southern portion of the ecoregion, south and east of the Grampians and Great Dividing Range, is drained by the Yarra, Macalister, Thompson, Snowy, and other rivers which empty into the Bass Strait or Tasman Sea.

It borders the Eastern Australian temperate forests to the northeast. The Southeast Australia temperate savanna lies to the north, the Murray-Darling woodlands and mallee lies to the northwest, and the Naracoorte woodlands lies to the west.

The ecoregion encompasses six IBRA bioregions – the New South Wales South Western Slopes, South East Coastal Plain, South East Corner, South Eastern Highlands, Southern Volcanic Plain, and Victorian Midlands.

Melbourne, Australia's second-largest city, is the largest city in the ecoregion.

== Flora ==
Plant communities in the ecoregion include wet sclerophyll forests, dry sclerophyll forests, eucalypt woodlands, temperate rainforest, grasslands, dense heath, coastal vegetation, and riparian communities.

=== Wet sclerophyll forest ===
Wet sclerophyll forests are common between the coast and the Great Dividing Range, which separates these more humid forests from the drier forests and woodlands of the interior. Trees are generally of medium height, with an understory of low shrubs. Eucalypts are the predominant trees, and characteristic species include brown stringybark (Eucalyptus baxteri), manna gum (E. viminalis), messmate stringybark (E. obliqua), and mountain grey gum (E. cypellocarpa). Brown stringybark is found on low-fertility soils, and messmate stringybark becomes common on more fertile soils.

=== Box-ironbark forest ===
Box-ironbark forest is found in the low hills between the Great Dividing Range and the drier woodlands of the interior plains. The predominant trees are grey box (Eucalyptus microcarpa), yellow gum (E. leucoxylon), and red ironbark (E. sideroxylon).

=== Eucalypt woodland ===
Eucalypt woodland is found in the drier interior. It is an open woodland of medium-sized trees, with 10 to 30 percent tree canopy cover. Common trees include grey box, yellow box (Eucalyptus melliodora), and Blakely's red gum (E. blakeleyi). The understorey is dominated by grasses such as Themeda triandra with few shrubs.

=== Grasslands ===
In the Geelong area and on the Southern Tablelands of New South Wales there are treeless basalt plains dominated by spear grasses (Stipa species Stipa scabra and S. bigeniculata).

== Fauna ==
Native mammals include the koala (Phascolarctos cinereus), southern subspecies of tiger quoll (Dasyurus maculatus maculatus), long-nosed potoroo (Potorous tridactylus), feathertail glider (Acrobates pygmaeus), and eastern pygmy possum (Cercartetus nanus). The mainland swamp antechinus (Antechinus minimus maritimus) and white footed dunnart (Sminthopsis leucopus) are restricted to the coastal region. The smoky mouse (Pseudomys fumeus) and agile antechinus (Antechinus agilis) are near-endemic. Leadbeater’s possum (Gymnobelideus leadbeateri) is endemic to the ecoregion, restricted to wet eucalypt forests of the Victorian Central Highlands.

== Protected areas ==
12.6% of the ecoregion is in protected areas. Protected areas include Croajingolong National Park, Snowy River National Park, Wadbilliga National Park, and Murramarang National Park in the South East Corner, Grampians National Park in the Victorian Midlands, Great Otway National Park in the coastal Otway Ranges southwest of Melbourne, and Mount Imlay National Park.

== See also ==
- Temperate Rainforests of New South Wales
