= Illawarra =

- Region
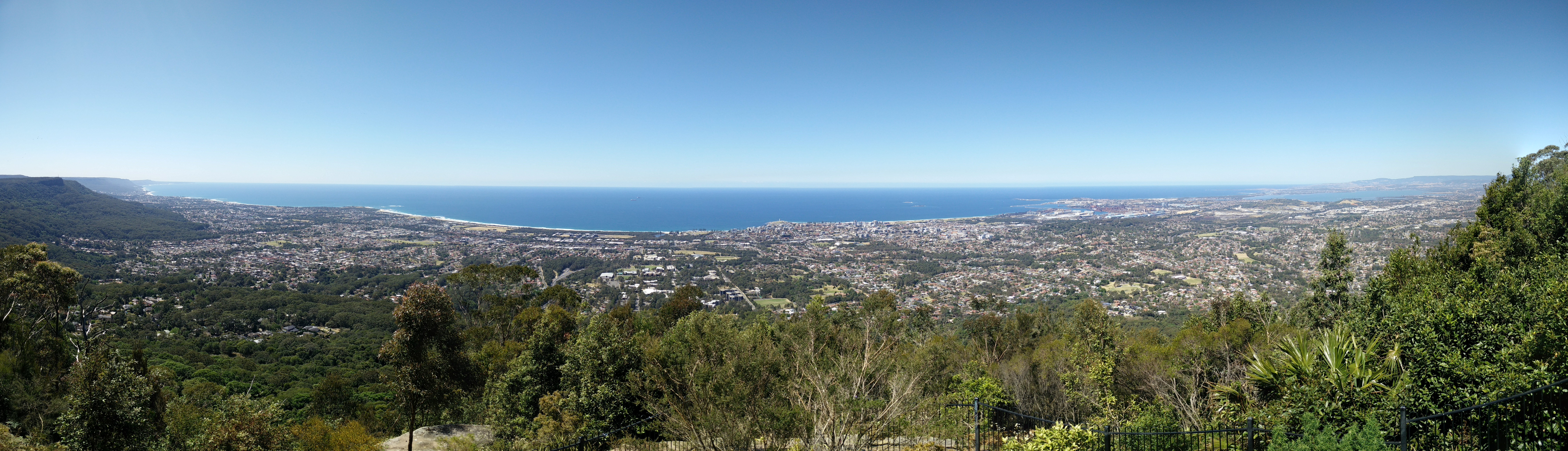
- Panoramic view from Mount Keira

- Coordinates: 34.5°S 150.9°E
- Country: Australia
- State: New South Wales
- LGA: Municipality of Kiama; City of Shellharbour; City of Wollongong
- Location: 85 km (53 mi) S of Sydney

Government
  - State electorates: Wollongong; Keira; Shellharbour; Heathcote; Kiama
  - Federal divisions: Cunningham; Whitlam; Gilmore

Area
  - Total: 1,089 km^{2} (420 sq mi)

Population
  - Total: 313,842 (2021)
  - Density: 288.19/km^{2} (746.4/sq mi)
- Time zone: UTC+10 (AEST)
  - Summer (DST): UTC+11 (AEDT)
Regions around Illawarra
Macarthur (Greater Sydney)	Southern Sydney (Greater Sydney)	Tasman Sea
Southern Highlands	Illawarra	Tasman Sea
Southern Tablelands	South Coast	Tasman Sea

The Illawarra is a coastal region in the southeast of the Australian state of New South Wales. It is situated immediately south of Sydney and north of the South Coast region. It encompasses the two cities of Wollongong, Shellharbour and the coastal town of Kiama. Wollongong is the largest city within the Illawarra with a population of 240,000, followed by Shellharbour with a population of 70,000 and Kiama with a population of 10,000. These three cities have their own suburbs. Wollongong stretches from Helensburgh in the north to Windang in the south, with Maddens Plains and Cordeaux in the west.

The Illawarra region is characterised by three distinct districts: the north-central district, which is a contiguous urban sprawl centred on Lake Illawarra, the western district defined by the Illawarra escarpment, which leads up to the fringe of Greater Metropolitan Sydney including the Macarthur in the northwest, and to the Southern Highlands region in the southwest, which is historically semi-rural, but now defined by increasing urbanisation.

== Etymology ==
The word "illawarra" is derived from the Aboriginal Tharawal word "allowrie," also sometimes spelled as "elouera" or "eloura." According to A. W. Reed, the word is variously translated as "pleasant place near the sea" or "high place near the sea." The prefix of "illa" is also known to mean "white clay;" with the suffix "warra," sometimes spelled as "wurra," meaning "mountain" in the local indigenous language. George Bass and Matthew Flinders were the first Europeans to visit the area, with Flinders recording that it 'was called "Allowrie" by the natives'.

For the period around 1806, the region was called "Five Islands"; referring to the group of five islands off Red Point. In 1817 Governor Macquarie, referring to region, wrote: 'part of the coast known generally by the name of the Five Islands, but called by the natives "Illawarra".

== History ==
Archaeological evidence indicates that Aboriginal people inhabited the Illawarra region for at least 20,000 years before the arrival of European settlers. The Tharawal and Wadi Wadi peoples were the traditional custodians of the land surrounding Lake Illawarra.

The first recorded European exploration of the Illawarra was conducted by Matthew Flinders and George Bass in 1796. The region remained largely uncharted until 1815, when a drought in Sydney prompted settlers to seek new grazing lands. That year, some of the traditional custodians guided European settlers and their cattle down the escarpment into the area.

== Geography ==
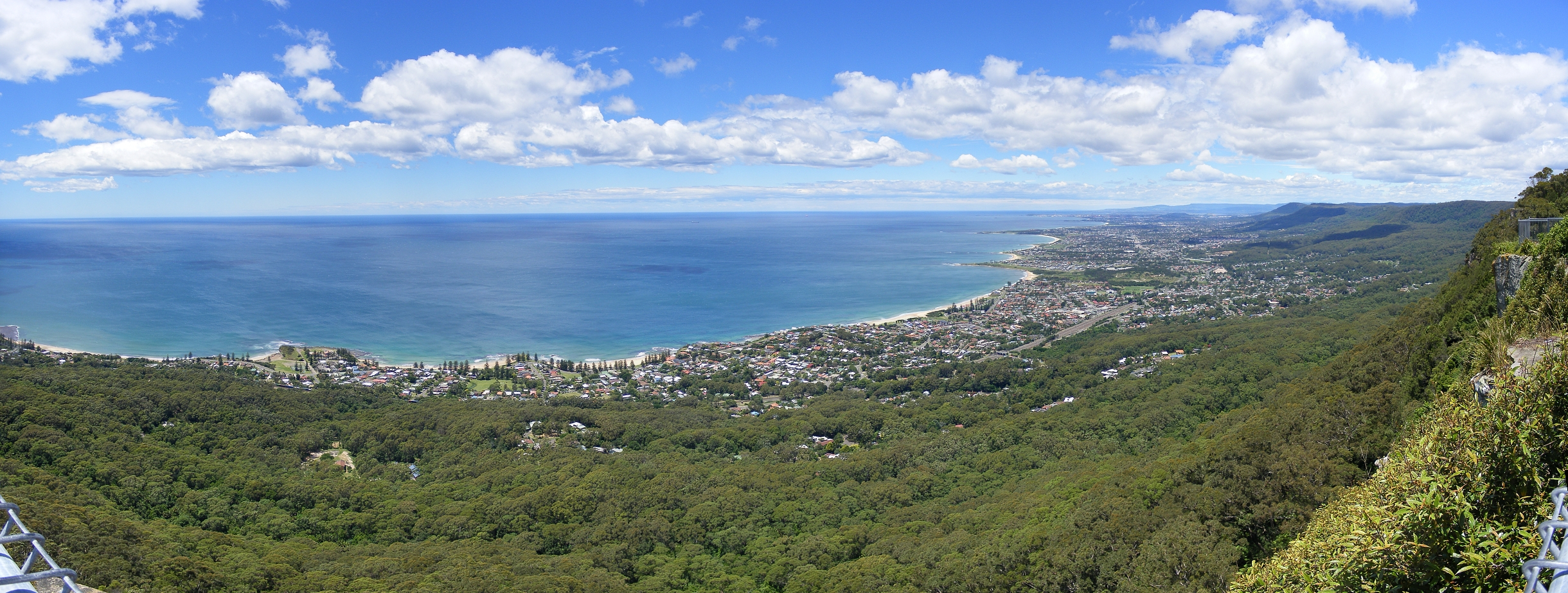
Lookout from the Illawarra escarpment above Wombarra over the northern Illawarra plain viewing Austinmer, Thirroul, Bulli, Wollongong up to Port Kembla in the far distance.

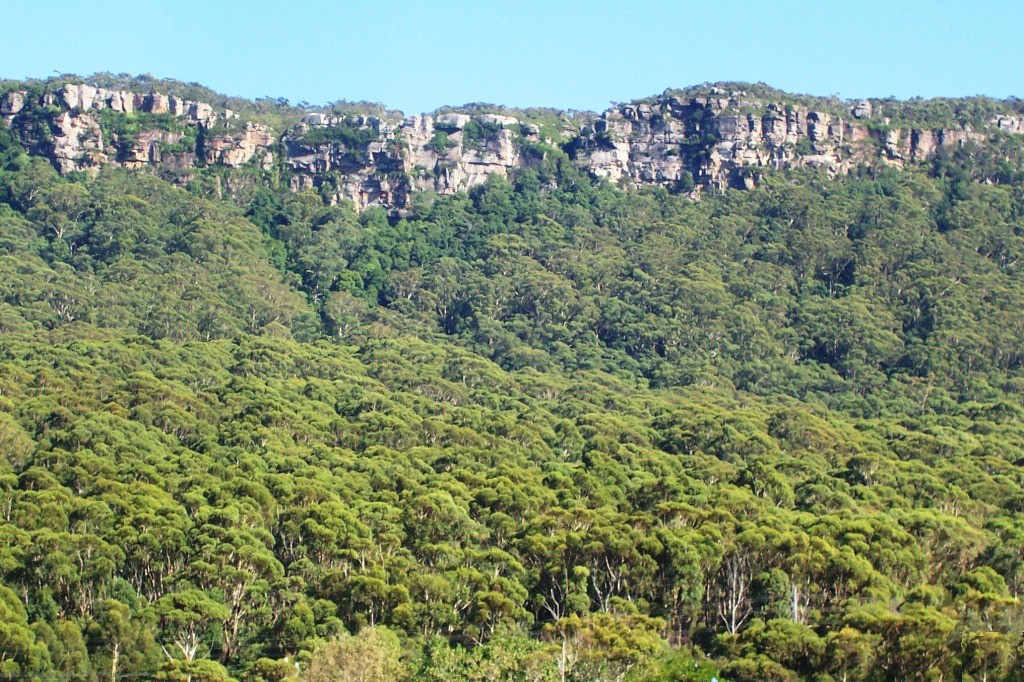
Illawarra Escarpment above Austinmer, showing Hawkesbury sandstone, Rainforest and Eucalyptus forest.

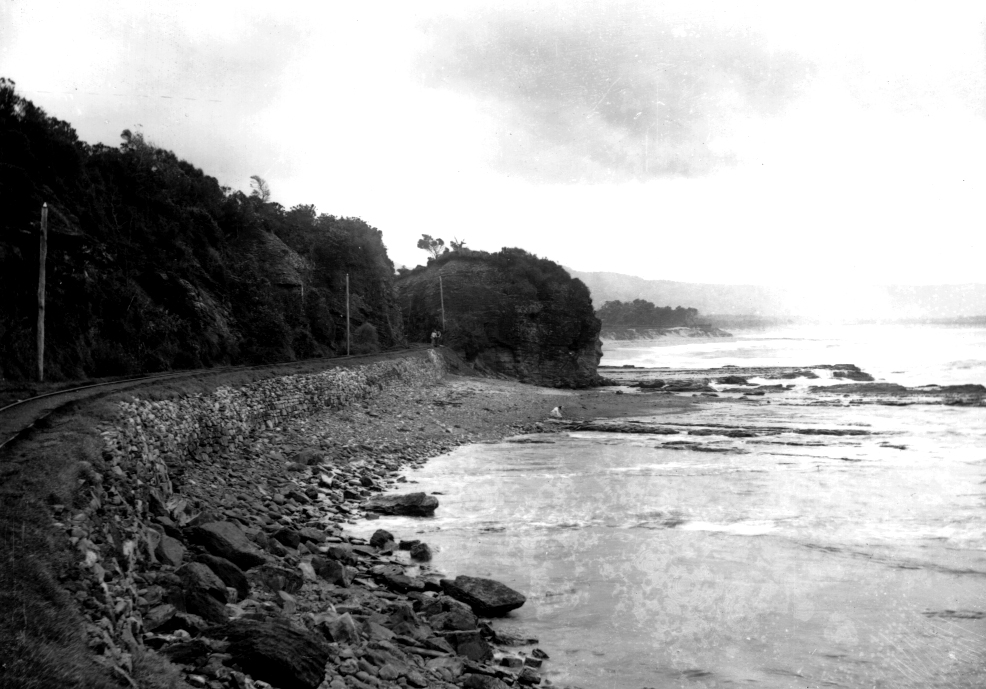
A section of the Illawarra coastline, c. 1900

The region consists of a grassy coastal plain, narrow in the north and wider in the south, bounded by the Tasman Sea on the east and the mountainous, almost impassable Illawarra escarpment (forming the eastern edge of the Southern Highlands plateau) to the west. In the middle of the region is Lake Illawarra, a shallow lake formed when sediment built up at the entrance to a bay. The district extends from the southern hills of the Royal National Park in the north to the Shoalhaven River in the south, and contains the city of Wollongong, the fourth largest urban area in New South Wales.

North of Wollongong the plain narrows to a small strip of land between the coast and the escarpment. At Coalcliff and Stanwell Park small valleys are formed allowing further settlement. To the south it widens, and becomes increasingly hillier before reaching Stockyard Mountain, a long divide between the main plain and the Jamberoo Valley, which stretches until it reaches Kiama. South of Kiama is Saddleback Mountain and south of that the Shoalhaven plains and the outcrop of Coolangatta Mountain.

=== Ecology ===
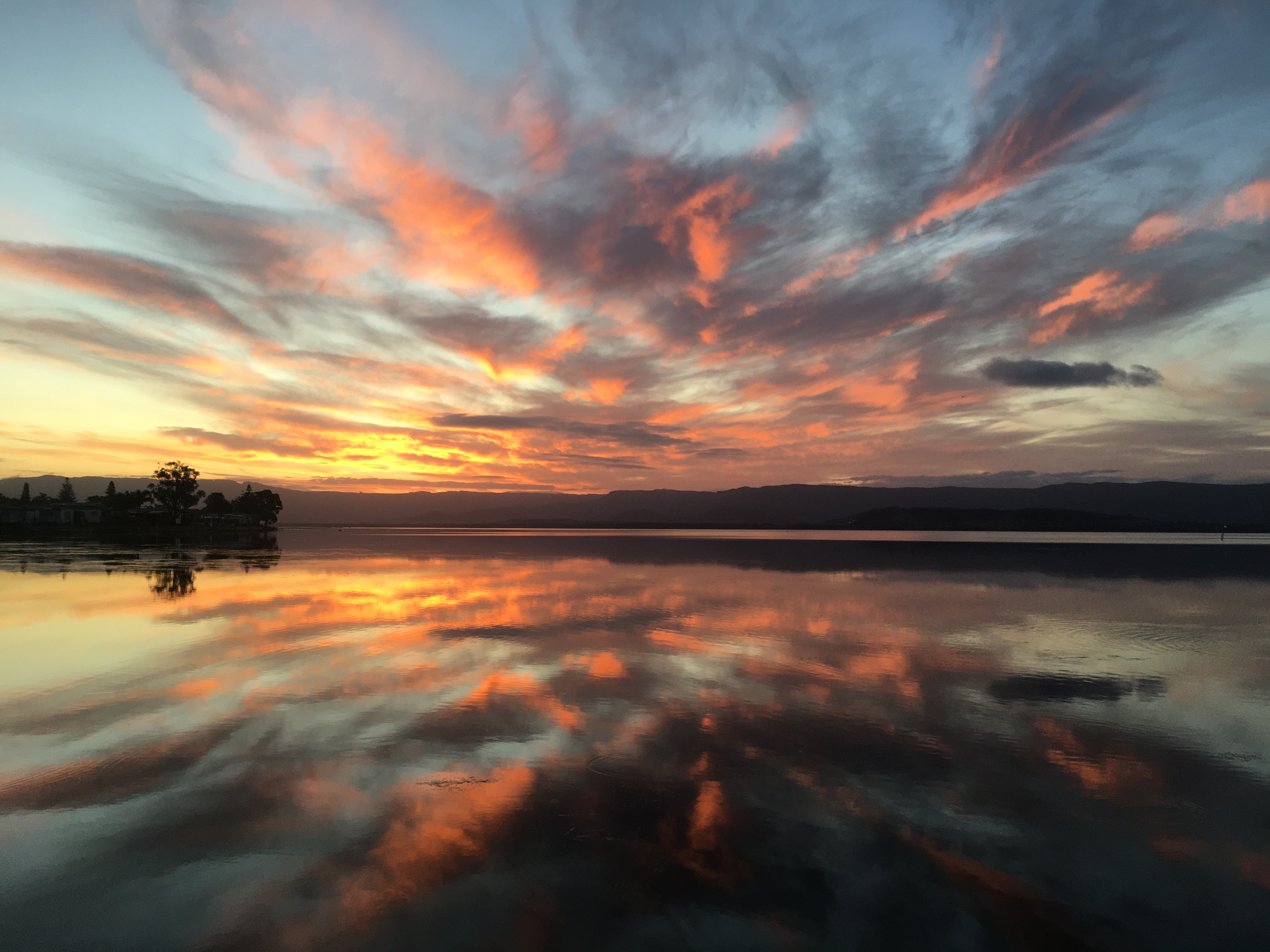
Illawarra sunset

Ecologically, the coastal grassy region of the Illawarra is within the Illawarra Lowlands Grassy Woodland biome. Characteristic tree species in the region include Eucalyptus tereticornis, Eucalyptus eugenioides, Eucalyptus longifolia, Eucalyptus bosistoana and Melaleuca decora. Shrub species include Acacia mearnsii, Dodonaea viscosa and as well as the endangered orchard Pterostylis gibbosa.

The wet elevated areas of the Illawarra, where rainfall exceeds 1300mm, are within the Southern Lowland Wet Sclerophyll Forests and Southern Escarpment Wet Sclerophyll Forests biomes which generally feature tall, compact eucalyptus forests 30m-60m tall and understorey that include moist shrubs, tree ferns, a few vines and a uninterrupted herbaceous groundcover. The Illawarra-Shoalhaven subtropical rainforest lies in the region.

== Government administration ==
For the purposes of Australian federal elections for the House of Representatives, the Illawarra region is contained within the electoral Divisions of Cunningham, Whitlam and the northern tip of Gilmore.

For the purposes of New South Wales elections for the NSW Legislative Assembly, the Illawarra region is contained within the electoral districts of Wollongong, Keira, Shellharbour, Heathcote, and Kiama.

For the purposes of local government administration, the Illawarra region is contained within the cities of Wollongong, Shellharbour and the Municipality of Kiama.

- The City of Wollongong forms the northernmost boundary, ranging from Helensburgh to Lake Illawarra, with northernmost coastal suburb Helensburgh and southernmost suburbs including Windang, Yallah and Haywards Bay.
- The City of Shellharbour is south of Wollongong City, and ranges from Albion Park Rail in the north, west to Macquarie Pass near the escarpment, south to Dunmore near the Minnamurra River, and bordered on the east by ocean stretching from Lake Illawarra, Warilla, Barrack Point and Shellharbour.
- The Municipality of Kiama is south of Shellharbour City, and ranges from the Minnamurra River, west to Bald Hill, and south to about 4 kilometres (2.5 mi) south of Gerroa.

== Economy ==
The main industries in the area have traditionally been farming, coal mining and steel making. Australia's largest steel-works, BlueScope, operates at Port Kembla. The area, especially around Port Kembla and Wollongong, was once known for its mainly industrial jobs, but since the 1990s commerce has played an increasing role in the city, overtaking industry in many areas.

Illawarra cattle were originally bred in Illawarra and are now Australia's 3rd largest breed in population. They are large dark red cows sometimes with white patches. They produce large amounts of high butter fat and high protein milk and are suited to the Australian climate. The Illawarra Central Co-operative Dairy Factory was used by the Illawarra Central Co-operative Dairy Co. Ltd. for the intake of milk and cream from dairy farmers in the local area.

Coal mining has been a key part to the Illawarra's economy for over 200 years. The southern part of the region has been a source of crushed-stone construction aggregate and railway track ballast material for over 140 years.

== Transport ==
The Illawarra region is linked to Sydney in the north by several passes, a motorway (Southern Freeway) and an electric railway (see Illawarra railway line); to the west by the Illawarra Highway and Picton Road; and to the south by the Princes Highway. At Albion Park Rail the Illawarra Regional Airport serves the region.

== Media ==
=== Television ===
The region is serviced by three commercial television networks – WIN Television, the Seven Network and Network 10. The Australian Broadcasting Corporation (ABC) and the Special Broadcasting Service (SBS) also broadcast television services to Wollongong. In addition to these channels, ten new channels broadcasting in are also available in the greater Illawarra region. These channels include ABC HD, ABC Kids, ABC Family, ABC Entertains, ABC News, 7HD, 7two, 7mate, 7flix, 7Bravo, 9HD, 9Go!, 9Gem, 9Life, 10 HD, 10 Drama, 10 Comedy. Nickelodeon, SBS HD, SBS Viceland, SBS World Movies, SBS Food, NITV and SBS WorldWatch. In some areas it is also possible to pick up Sydney channels. Subscription Television service Foxtel (formerly Austar) is also available via satellite.

Of the three main commercial networks:

- WIN Television airs a half-hour local WIN News each weeknight at 5:30pm, produced and broadcast from the network's headquarters in the Wollongong.
- Network 10 (formerly Southern Cross 10) airs short news & weather updates of 10 News throughout the day from Hobart.
- The Seven Network airs short local news and weather updates of Seven News throughout the day, produced and broadcast from its Canberra studios.

=== Radio ===
The region is served by these local radio stations:

- ABC Illawarra (part of ABC Local Radio)
- i98FM (commercial)
- 96.5 Wave FM (commercial)
- VOX FM (community)

== Sport ==
=== Rugby League Football ===
The Illawarra Steelers Rugby league Football Club played in the NSWRL rugby league competition, then the NRL, from 1982 to 1998, and currently forms one half of the St George Illawarra Dragons joint venture, who play six of their twelve home games at WIN Stadium in Wollongong. The Illawarra Steelers still field teams in the lower rugby league divisions.

Many famous footballers, such as Bob Fulton, Graeme Langlands, Mick Cronin, Rod Wishart, Paul McGregor, Craig Fitzgibbon, Luke Bailey, Steve Roach, Garry Jack, Warren Ryan, and the Stewart brothers Brett and Glenn, have come from the Illawarra region.

=== Basketball ===
The Illawarra Hawks have represented the region (previously known as The Hawks and the Wollongong Hawks) since the foundation year of the NBL, 1979. They won the NBL championship in 2001 defeating the Townsville Crocs 2-1 in the best of 3 finals. They also finished as runners-up in 2005 and 2010 seasons. The team caught global attention when American teen sensation LaMelo Ball announced on ESPN's show The Jump that he will be joining the Hawks through the NBL's Next Star program. In April 2020, LaMelo Ball and his business manager, Jermaine Jackson announced they had bought the Hawks.

=== Association football ===
The Wollongong Wolves participated in the now defunct NSL, winning back to back premierships in 2000 and 2001. The Wolves were not selected for the NSL's replacement, the A-League, and instead chose to compete in the New South Wales Premier League under the name Wollongong FC. The Wolves organisation collapsed in 2008, and was taken over by Wollongong Community Football Club. The Wolves have continued to play in the New South Wales Premier League.

=== Cricket ===
Cricket has also been played in the Illawarra for at least one hundred and fifty years with the Keira Cricket Club being founded in 1862.

=== Water Polo ===
The first recorded match of water polo in the Illawarra came in 1894, in a men's match between the Wollongong and Kiama Swim Clubs at Brighton Beach. The Kiama Swim Club prevailed, winning 3–0. Water polo is currently played at UOW Pool through the Illawarra Water Polo Club. Each year, Illawarra also compete at the NSW Country Club Championships, whereby the Illawarra U14's boys won in 2021.

== See also ==
- Australian Regional Rivalries
- BlueScope
- Electoral district of Illawarra, a seat in the New South Wales Legislative Assembly
- Illawarra escarpment
- Illawarra Coke Company
- Lake Illawarra
- Coastal coal-carrying trade
- Stone Fleet
