= Illawarra Central Co-operative Dairy Factory =

The Illawarra Central Co-operative Dairy Factory was used by the Illawarra Central Co-operative Dairy Co. Ltd. for the intake of milk and cream from dairy farmers in the local area. The factory had a siding that connected it to the Sydney milk trade by the South Coast railway. Although the factory is not the first dairy factory in Albion Park (the first was the Albion Park Dairy Co-operative Factory located in present-day Tongarra), the ICCD factory was significant in the early dairy industry in the region for its association with the transportation of dairy produce by rail.

== History ==
In the years prior to the creation of the ICCD factory, dairy farmers in the region had been reliant on commercial vendors based in Sydney who controlled the prices of their produce. With the extension of the Illawarra railway and the introduction of mechanical cream separation into the region, the dairy farmers were empowered to unite under a co-operative initiative which would see market power shift back to the farmers. In September of this year the factory was officially opened with the breaking of a milk bottle in lieu of the customary champagne. Cream dispatches by 51 initial suppliers soon occurred.

== See also ==
- Dairy farming in Australia
