= Montane ecosystem =

Ecosystems found in mountains

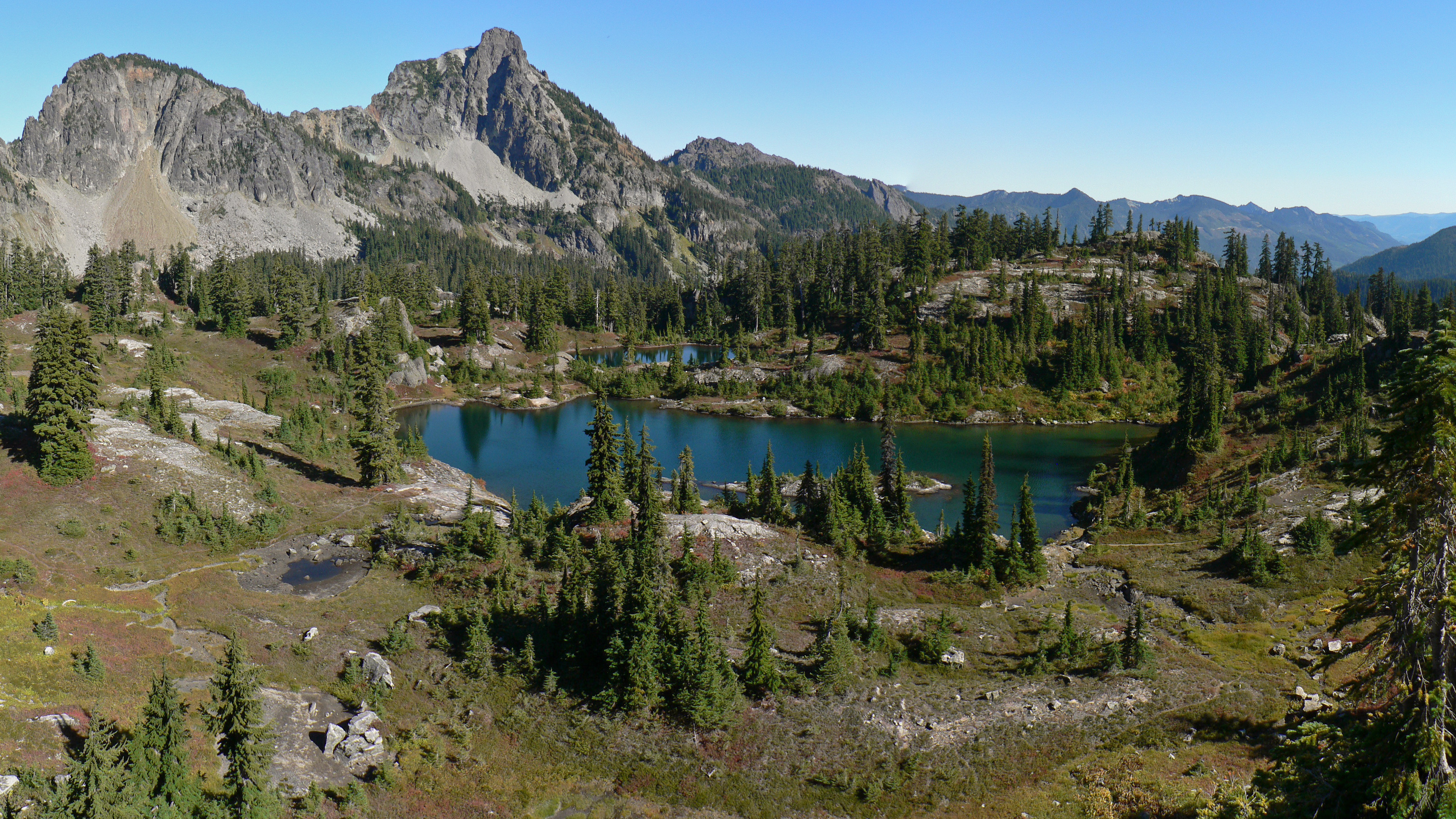
A subalpine lake in the Cascade Range, Washington, United States

Coverage of important mountain biodiversity sites in protected areas by country

Montane ecosystems are found on the slopes of mountains. The alpine climate in these regions strongly affects the ecosystem because temperatures fall as elevation increases, causing the ecosystem to stratify. This stratification is a crucial factor in shaping plant community, biodiversity, metabolic processes and ecosystem dynamics for montane ecosystems. Dense montane forests are common at moderate elevations, due to moderate temperatures and high rainfall. At higher elevations, the climate is harsher, with lower temperatures and higher winds, preventing the growth of trees and causing the plant community to transition to montane grasslands and shrublands or alpine tundra. Due to the unique climate conditions of montane ecosystems, they contain increased numbers of endemic species. Montane ecosystems also exhibit variation in ecosystem services, which include carbon storage and water supply.

== Life zones ==
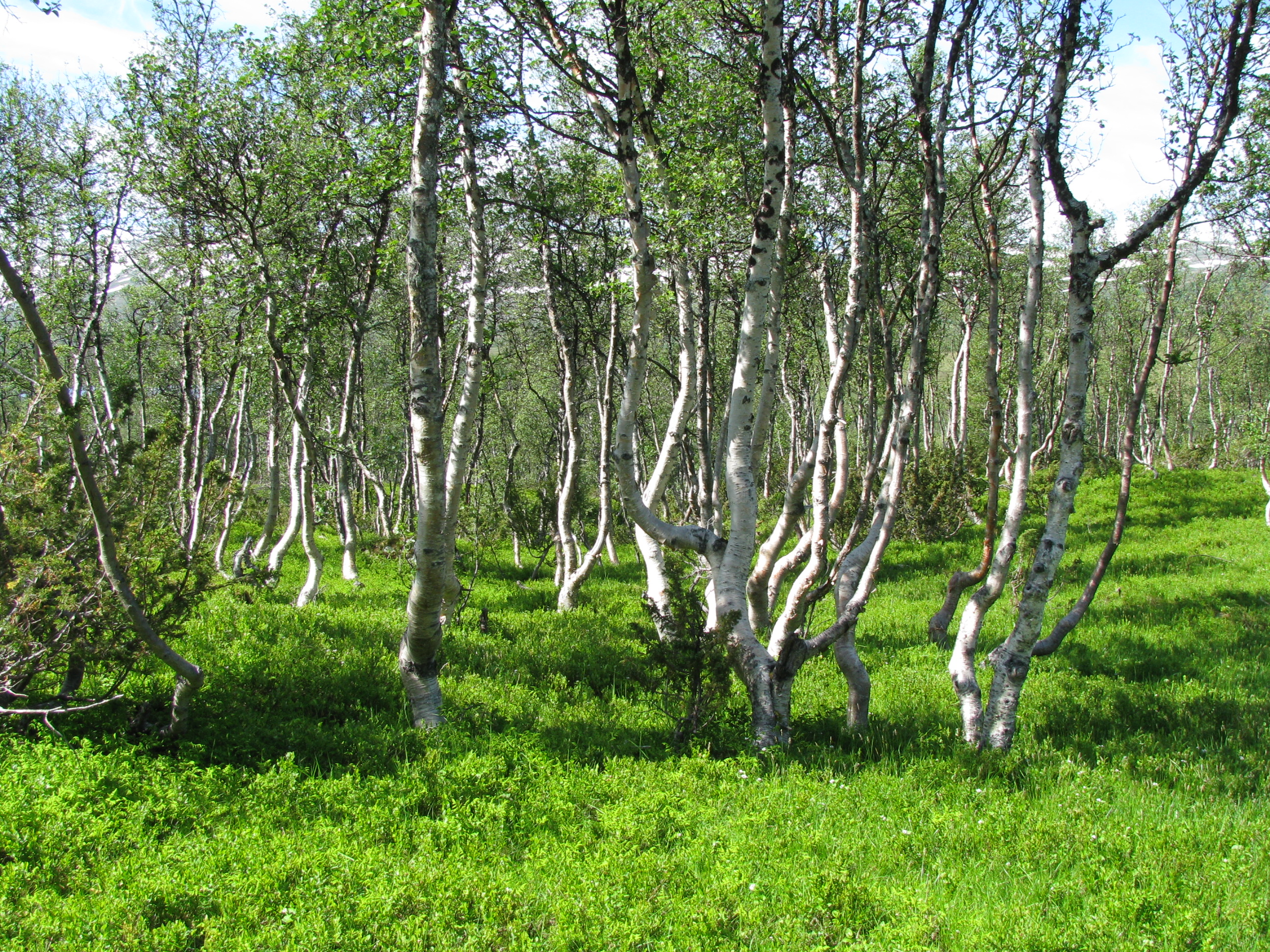
A stand of mountain birch at around 750 m in Trollheimen, typical of Scandinavian subalpine forests

As elevation increases, the climate becomes cooler, due to a decrease in atmospheric pressure and the adiabatic cooling of airmasses. In middle latitudes, the change in climate by moving up 100 meters on a mountain is roughly equivalent to moving 80 kilometers (45 miles or 0.75° of latitude) towards the nearest pole. The characteristic flora and fauna in the mountains tend to strongly depend on elevation, because of the change in climate. This dependency causes life zones to form: bands of similar ecosystems at similar elevations.

One of the typical life zones on mountains is the montane forest: at moderate elevations, the rainfall and temperate climate encourages dense forests to grow. Holdridge defines the climate of montane forest as having a biotemperature of between 6 and 12 °C (43 and 54 °F), where biotemperature is the mean temperature considering temperatures below 0 °C (32 °F) to be 0 °C (32 °F). Above the elevation of the montane forest, the trees thin out in the subalpine zone, become twisted krummholz, and eventually fail to grow. Therefore, montane forests often contain trees with twisted trunks. This phenomenon is observed due to the increase in the wind strength with the elevation. The elevation where trees fail to grow is called the tree line. The biotemperature of the subalpine zone is between 3 and 6 °C (37 and 43 °F).

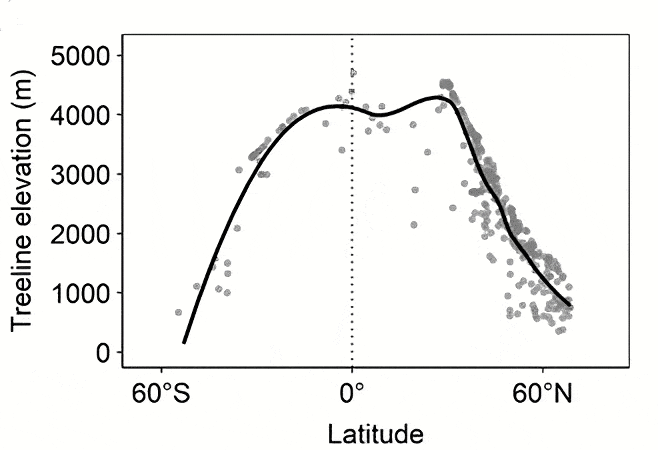
Treeline elevation by latitude

Above the tree line the ecosystem is called the alpine zone or alpine tundra, dominated by grasses and low-growing shrubs. The biotemperature of the alpine zone is between 1.5 and 3 °C (34.7 and 37.4 °F). Many different plant species live in the alpine environment, including perennial grasses, sedges, forbs, cushion plants, mosses, and lichens. Alpine plants must adapt to the harsh conditions of the alpine environment, which include low temperatures, dryness, ultraviolet radiation, and a short growing season. Alpine plants display adaptations such as rosette structures, waxy surfaces, and hairy leaves. Because of the common characteristics of these zones, the World Wildlife Fund groups a set of related ecoregions into the "montane grassland and shrubland" biome. A region in the Hengduan Mountains adjoining Asia's Tibetan Plateau have been identified as the world's oldest continuous alpine ecosystem with a community of 3000 plant species, some of them continuously co-existing for 30 million years.

Climates with biotemperatures below 1.5 °C (35 °F) tend to consist purely of rock and ice.

== Montane forests ==
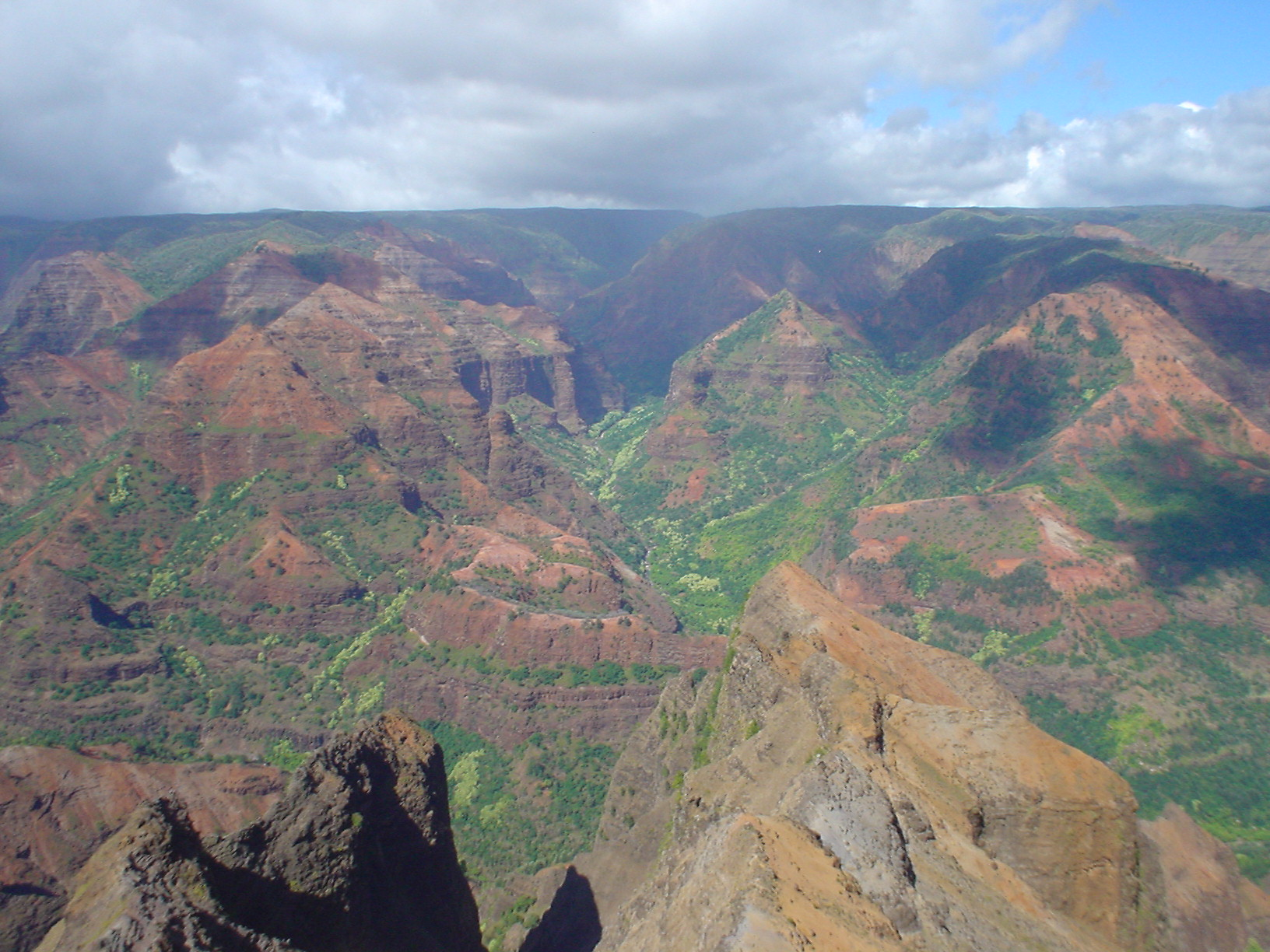
Waimea Canyon, Hawaii, is known for its montane vegetation

Montane forests occur between the submontane zone and the subalpine zone. The elevation at which one habitat changes to another varies across the globe, particularly by latitude. The upper limit of montane forests, the tree line, is often marked by a change to hardier species that occur in less dense stands. For example, in the Sierra Nevada of California, the montane forest has dense stands of lodgepole pine and red fir, while the Sierra Nevada subalpine zone contains sparse stands of whitebark pine.

The lower bound of the montane zone may be a "lower timberline" that separates the montane forest from drier steppe or desert region.

Montane forests differ from lowland forests in the same area. The climate of montane forests is colder than lowland climate at the same latitude, so the montane forests often have species typical of higher-latitude lowland forests. Humans can disturb montane forests through forestry and agriculture. On isolated mountains, montane forests surrounded by treeless dry regions are typical "sky island" ecosystems.

=== Temperate climate ===
Montane forests in temperate climate are typically one of temperate coniferous forest or temperate broadleaf and mixed forest, forest types that are well known from Europe and northeastern North America. Montane forests outside Europe tend to be more species-rich, because Europe during the Pleistocene offered smaller-area refugia from the glaciers.

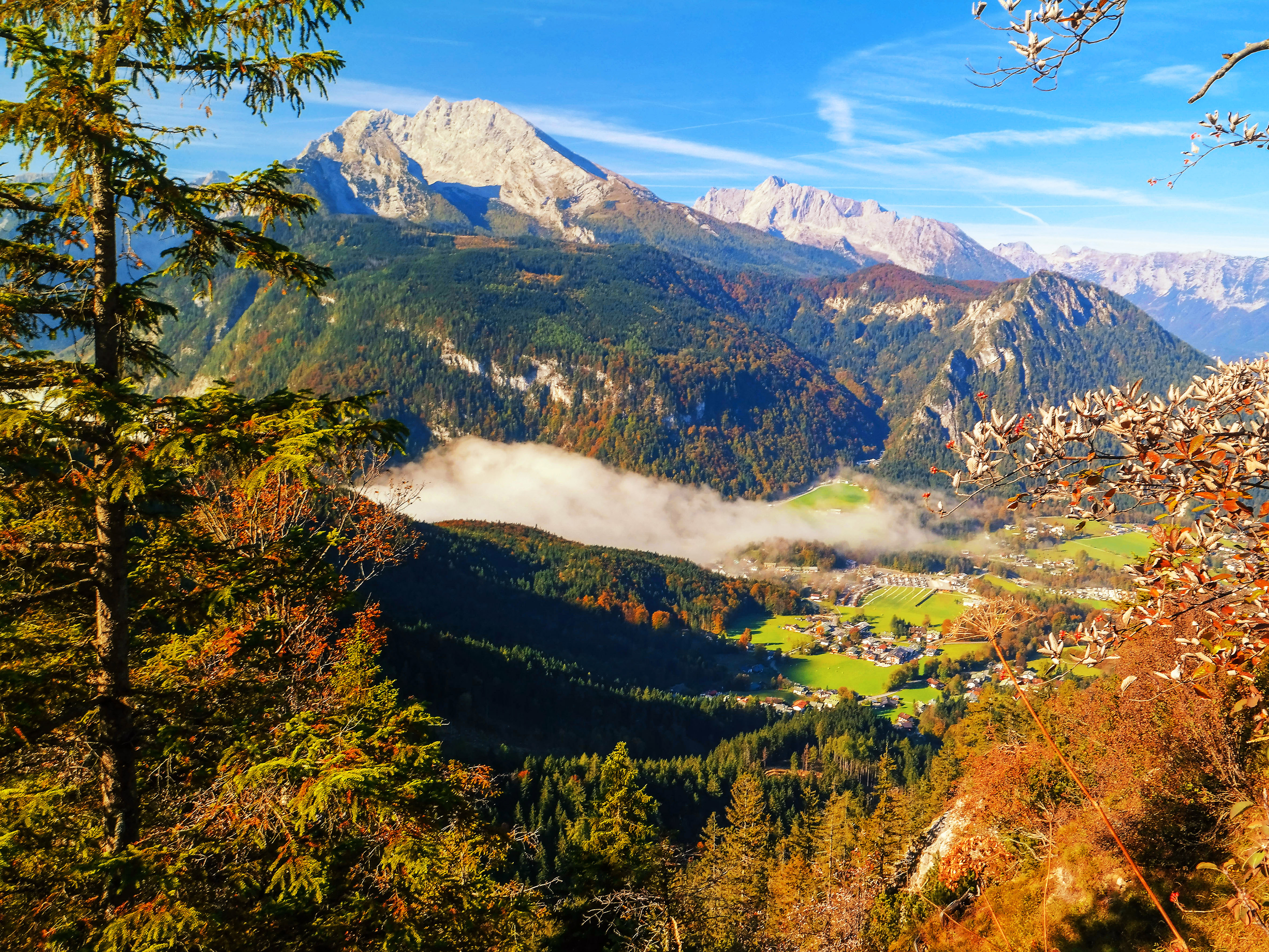
Temperate montane forest in Bavaria, Germany

Montane forests in temperate climate occur in Europe (the Alps, Carpathians, and more), in North America (e.g. Appalachians, Rocky Mountains, Cascade Range, and Sierra Nevada), South America, New Zealand, and the Himalayas.

Climate change is predicted to affect temperate montane forests. For example, in the Pacific Northwest of North America, climate change may cause "potential reduced snowpack, higher levels of evapotranspiration and increased summer drought" which will negatively affect montane wetlands.

=== Mediterranean climate ===
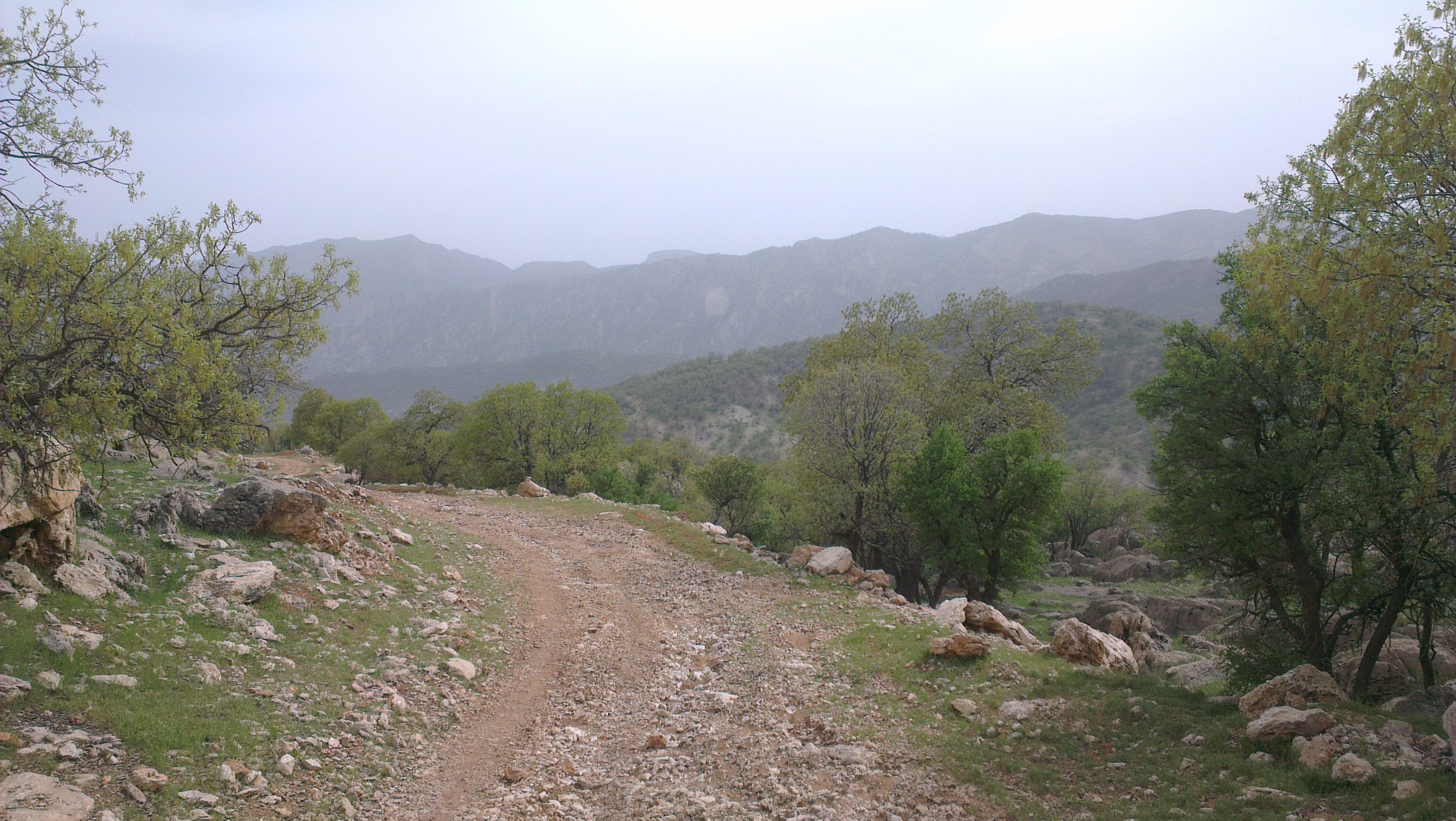
Iranian oak scrub in the Zagros Mountains

Montane forests in Mediterranean climate are warm and dry except in winter, when they are relatively wet and mild. Montane forests located in Mediterranean climates, known as oro-Mediterranean, exhibit towering trees alongside high biomass. These forests are typically mixed conifer and broadleaf forests, with only a few conifer species. Pine and juniper are typical trees found in Mediterranean montane forests. The broadleaf trees show more variety and are often evergreen, e.g. evergreen oak.

This type of forest is found in the Mediterranean Basin, North Africa, Mexico and the southwestern US, Iran, Pakistan and Afghanistan.

=== Subtropical and tropical climate ===
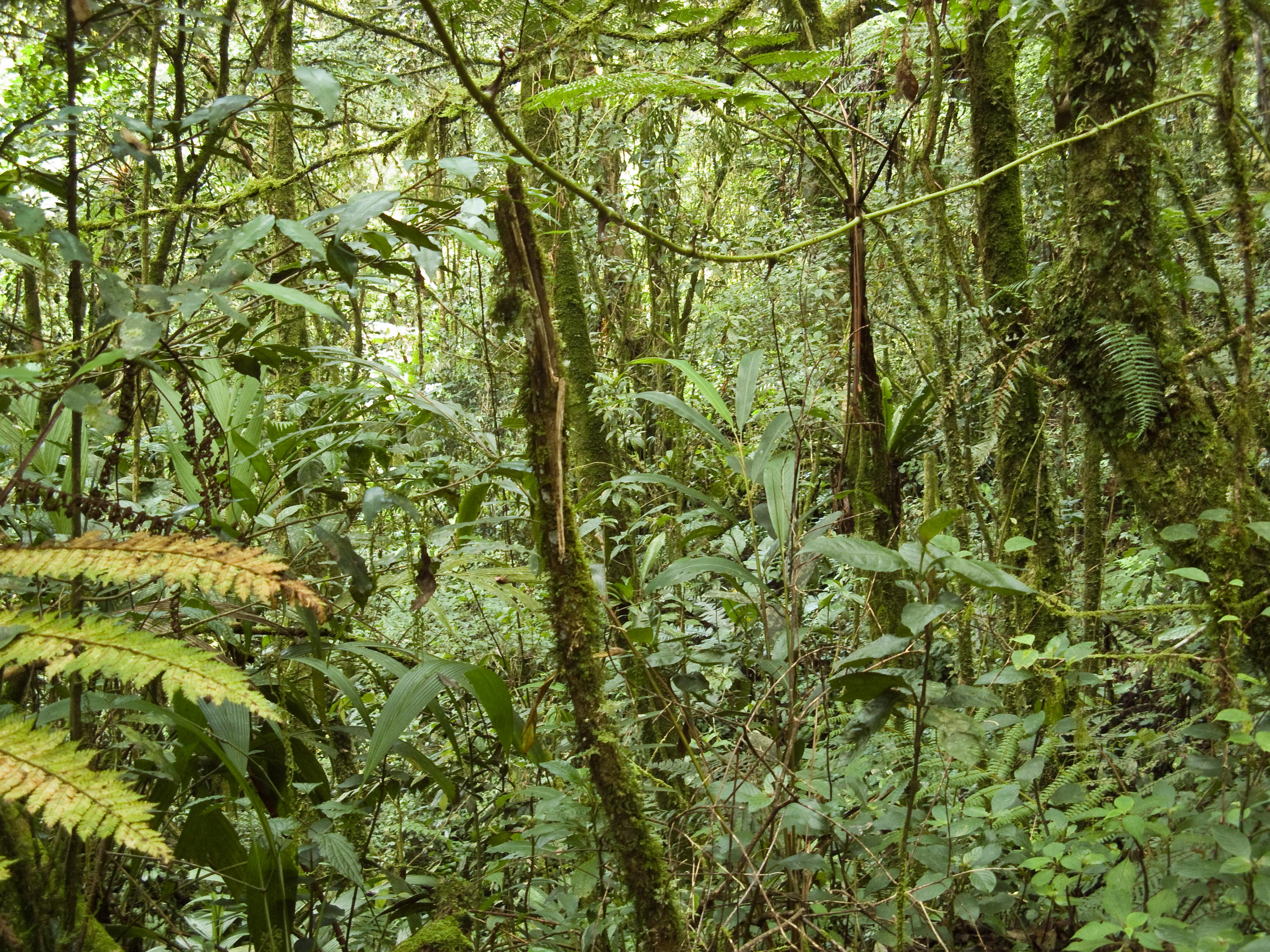
Tropical montane forest at around 2,000 m in Malaysia

In the tropics, montane forests can consist of broadleaf forest in addition to coniferous forest. One example of a tropical montane forest is a cloud forest, which gains its moisture from clouds and fog. Cloud forests often exhibit an abundance of mosses covering the ground and vegetation, in which case they are also referred to as mossy forests. Mossy forests usually develop on the saddles of mountains, where moisture introduced by settling clouds is more effectively retained. Depending on latitude, the lower limit of montane rainforests on large mountains is generally between 1,500 and 2,500 metres (4,900 and 8,200 ft) while the upper limit is usually from 2,400 to 3,300 metres (7,900 to 10,800 ft).

Tropical montane forests might exhibit high sensitivity to climate change. Climate change may cause variation in temperature, precipitation and humidity, which will cause stress on tropical montane forests. The predicted upcoming impacts of climate change might significantly affect biodiversity loss and might result in change of species range and community dynamics. Global climate models predict reduced cloudiness in the future. Reduction in cloudiness may already be affecting the Monteverde cloud forest in Costa Rica.

== Subalpine zone ==
The subalpine zone is the biotic zone immediately below the tree line around the world. In tropical regions of Southeast Asia the tree line may be above 4,000 m (13,000 ft), whereas in Scotland it may be as low as 450 m (1,480 ft). Species that occur in this zone depend on the location of the zone on the Earth; for example, Pinus mugo (scrub mountain pine) occurs in Europe, the snow gum is found in Australia, and the subalpine larch, mountain hemlock, and subalpine fir occur in western North America.

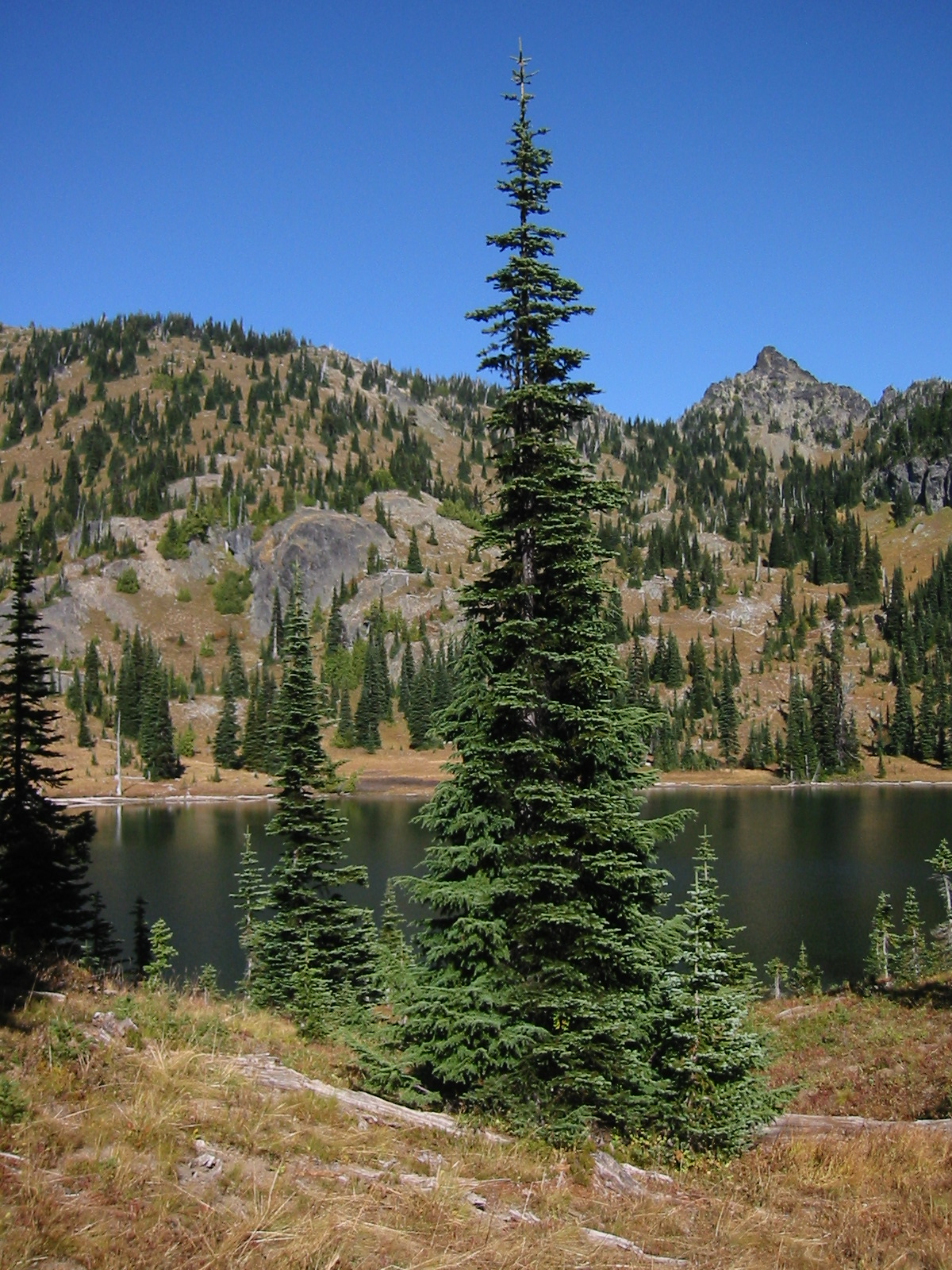
Subalpine fir in Mount Rainier National Park, Washington, United States

Trees in the subalpine zone often become krummholz, that is, crooked wood, stunted and twisted in form. At tree line, tree seedlings may germinate on the lee side of rocks and grow only as high as the rock provides wind protection. Further growth is more horizontal than vertical, and additional rooting may occur where branches contact the soil. Snow cover may protect krummholz trees during the winter, but branches higher than wind-shelters or snow cover are usually destroyed. Well-established krummholz trees may be several hundred to a thousand years old.

Meadows may be found in the subalpine zone. Tuolumne Meadows in the Sierra Nevada of California, is an example of a subalpine meadow.

Example subalpine zones around the world include the French Prealps in Europe, the Sierra Nevada and Rocky Mountain subalpine zones in North America, and subalpine forests in the eastern Himalaya, western Himalaya, and Hengduan mountains of Asia.

== Alpine grasslands and tundra ==
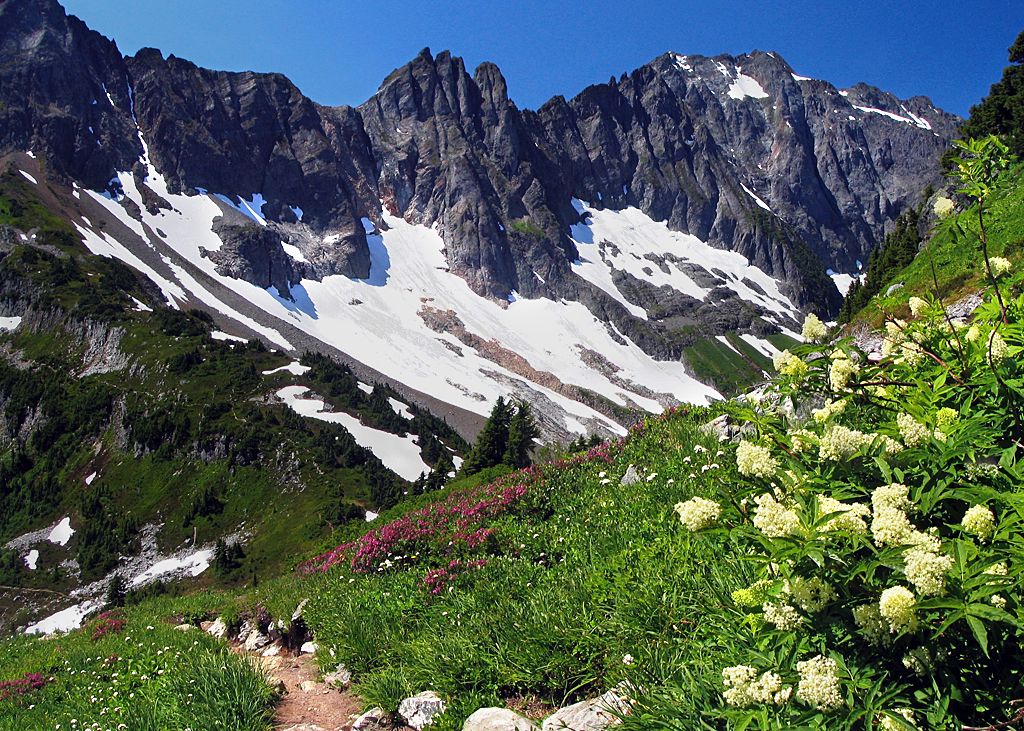
Alpine flora near Cascade Pass

Alpine grasslands and tundra lie above the tree line, in a world of intense radiation, wind, cold, snow, and ice. As a consequence, alpine vegetation is close to the ground and consists mainly of perennial grasses, sedges, and forbs. Annual plants are rare in this ecosystem and usually are only a few inches tall, with weak root systems. Other common plant life-forms include prostrate shrubs; tussock-forming graminoids; and cryptogams, such as bryophytes and lichens.

Plants have adapted to the harsh alpine environment. Cushion plants, looking like ground-hugging clumps of moss, escape the strong winds blowing a few inches above them. Many flowering plants of the alpine tundra have dense hairs on stems and leaves to provide wind protection or red-colored pigments capable of converting the sun's light rays into heat. Some plants take two or more years to form flower buds, which survive the winter below the surface and then open and produce fruit with seeds in the few weeks of summer. Non-flowering lichens cling to rocks and soil. Their enclosed algal cells can photosynthesize at temperatures as low as −10 °C (14 °F), and the outer fungal layers can absorb more than their own weight in water.

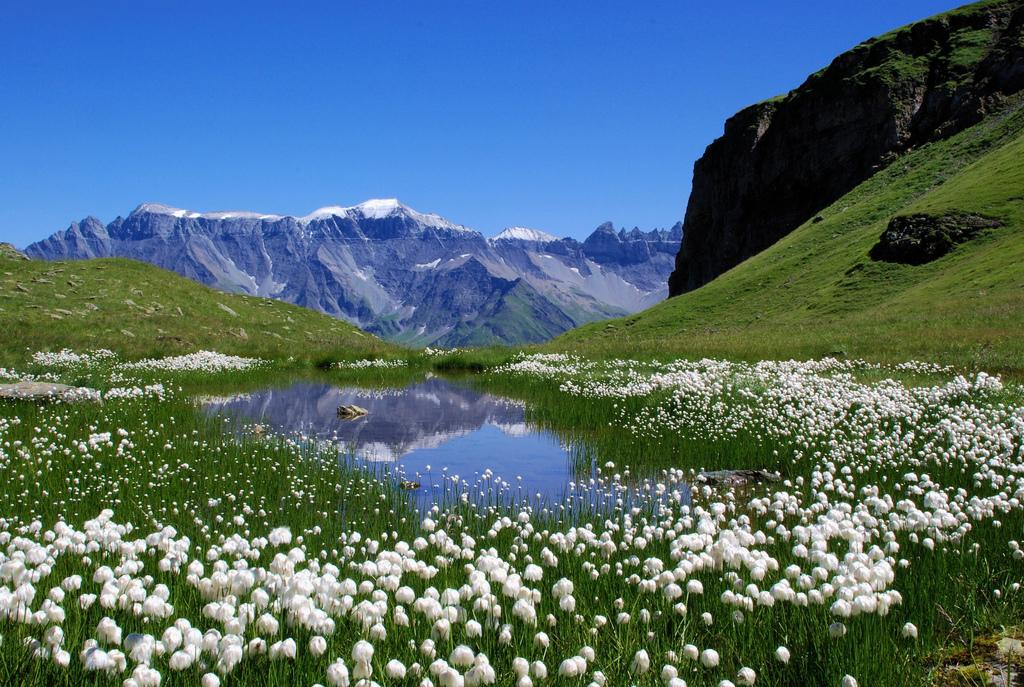
An alpine mire in the Swiss Alps

The adaptations for survival of drying winds and cold may make tundra vegetation seem very hardy, but in some respects the tundra is very fragile. Repeated footsteps often destroy tundra plants, leaving exposed soil to blow away, and recovery may take hundreds of years.

Alpine meadows form where sediments from the weathering of rocks has produced soils well-developed enough to support grasses and sedges. Alpine grasslands are common enough around the world to be categorized as a biome by the World Wildlife Fund. The biome, called "Montane grasslands and shrublands", often evolved as virtual islands, separated from other montane regions by warmer, lower elevation regions, and are frequently home to many distinctive and endemic plants which evolved in response to the cool, wet climate and abundant sunlight.

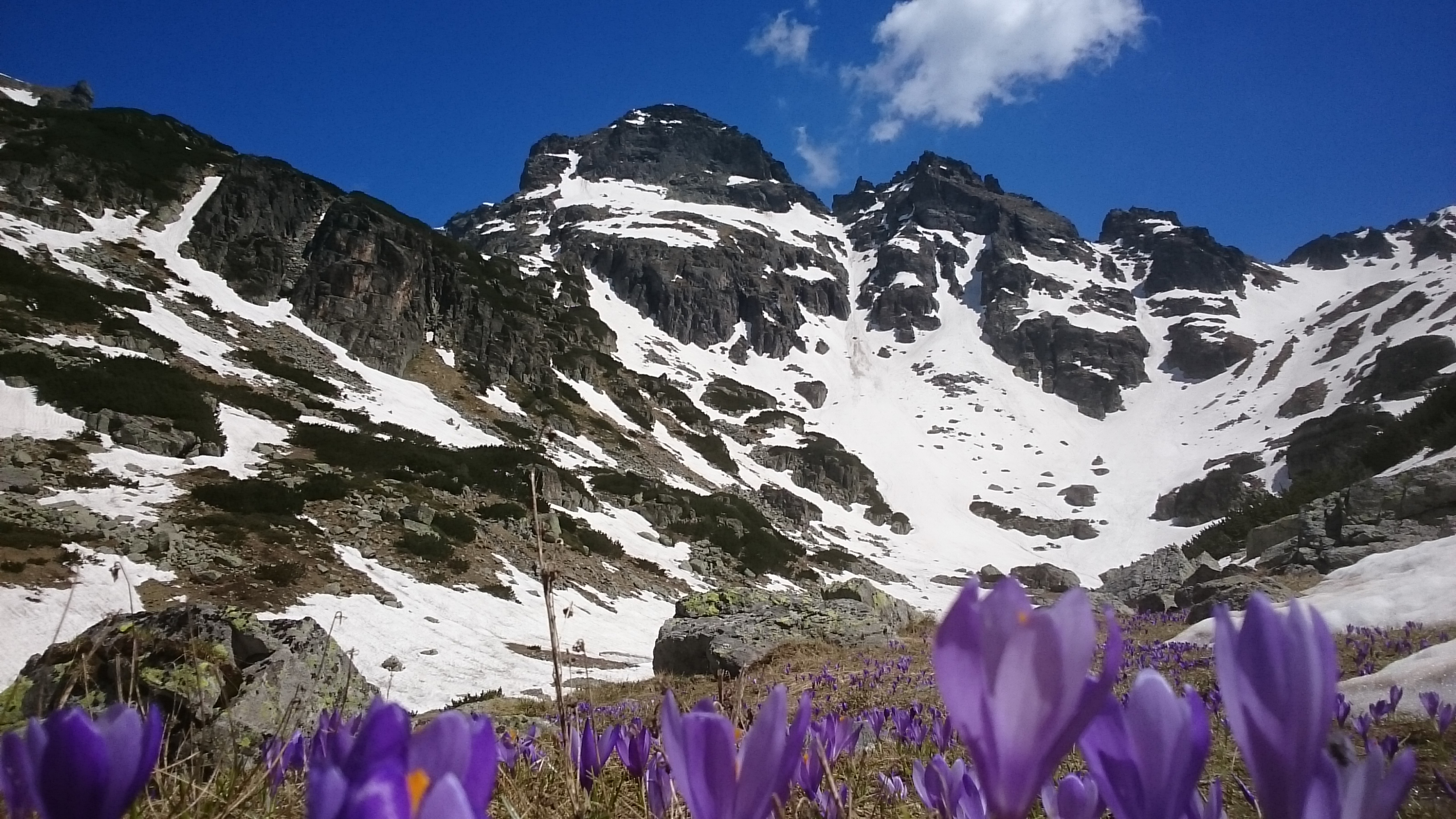
Alpine landscape below Malyovitsa Peak, Rila Mountain, Bulgaria

The most extensive montane grasslands and shrublands occur in the Neotropical páramo of the Andes Mountains. This biome also occurs in the mountains of east and central Africa, Mount Kinabalu of Borneo, the highest elevations of the Western Ghats in South India and the Central Highlands of New Guinea. A unique feature of many wet tropical montane regions is the presence of giant rosette plants from a variety of plant families, such as Lobelia (Afrotropic), Puya (Neotropic), Cyathea (New Guinea), and Argyroxiphium (Hawaii).

Where conditions are drier, one finds montane grasslands, savannas, and woodlands, like the Ethiopian Highlands, and montane steppes, like the steppes of the Tibetan Plateau.

== See also ==
- Forest ecology
- Tree line
- Temperate coniferous forests
- Ecology of the Rocky Mountains
- Sierra Nevada lower montane forest
- East African montane forests
- Afromontane, a series of high-elevation regions in Africa
- California montane chaparral and woodlands, an ecoregion.
- Angolan montane forest-grassland mosaic, an ecoregion.
- Australian Alps montane grasslands, an ecoregion.
- South Western Ghats montane rain forests, an ecoregion
- Polonyna (montane meadow)
- Altitudinal zonation
- Biome
