= Naracoorte woodlands =

Ecoregion in southern Australia

Naracoorte woodlands Naracoorte Coastal Plain
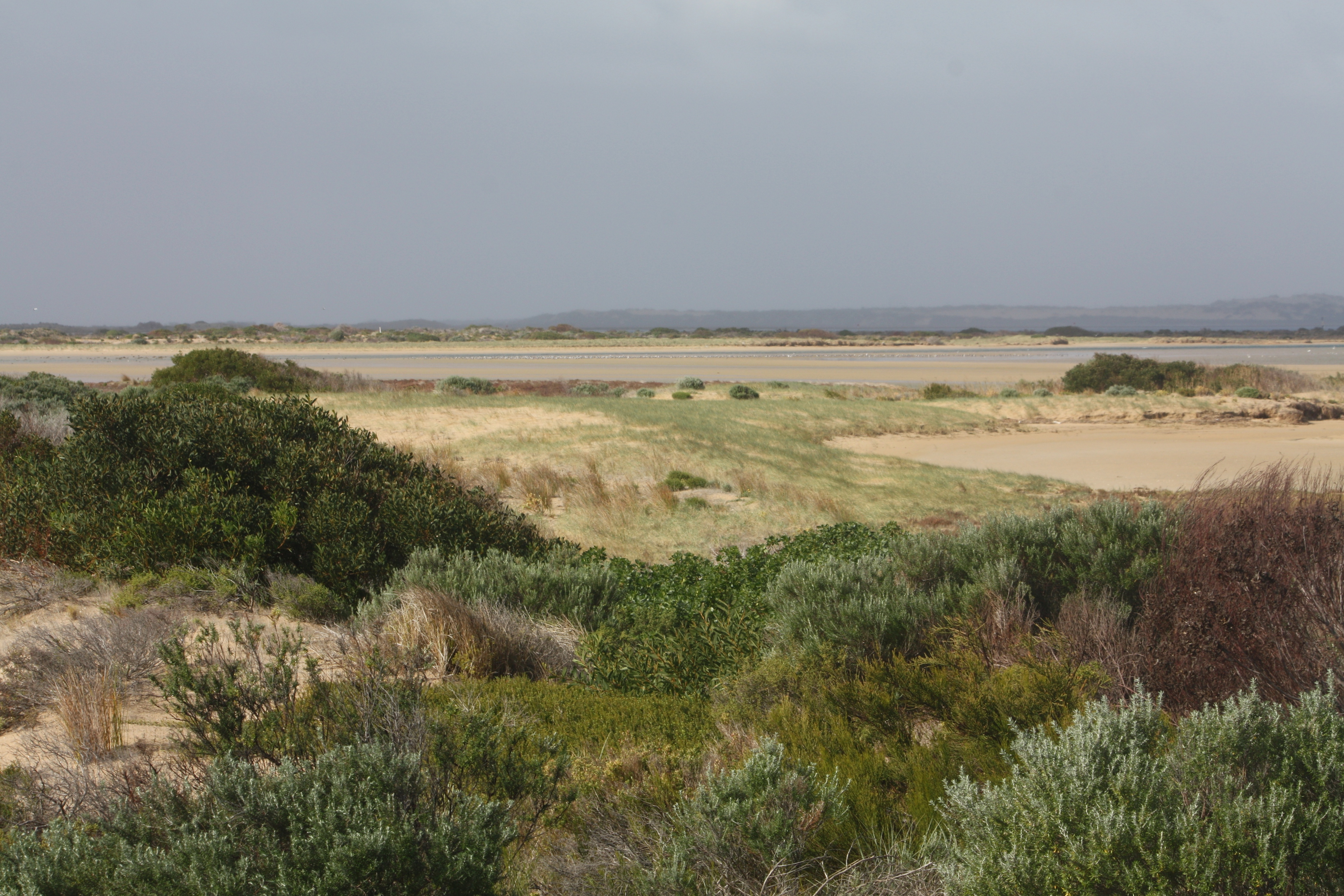
- Looking up the Coorong from the Murray mouth

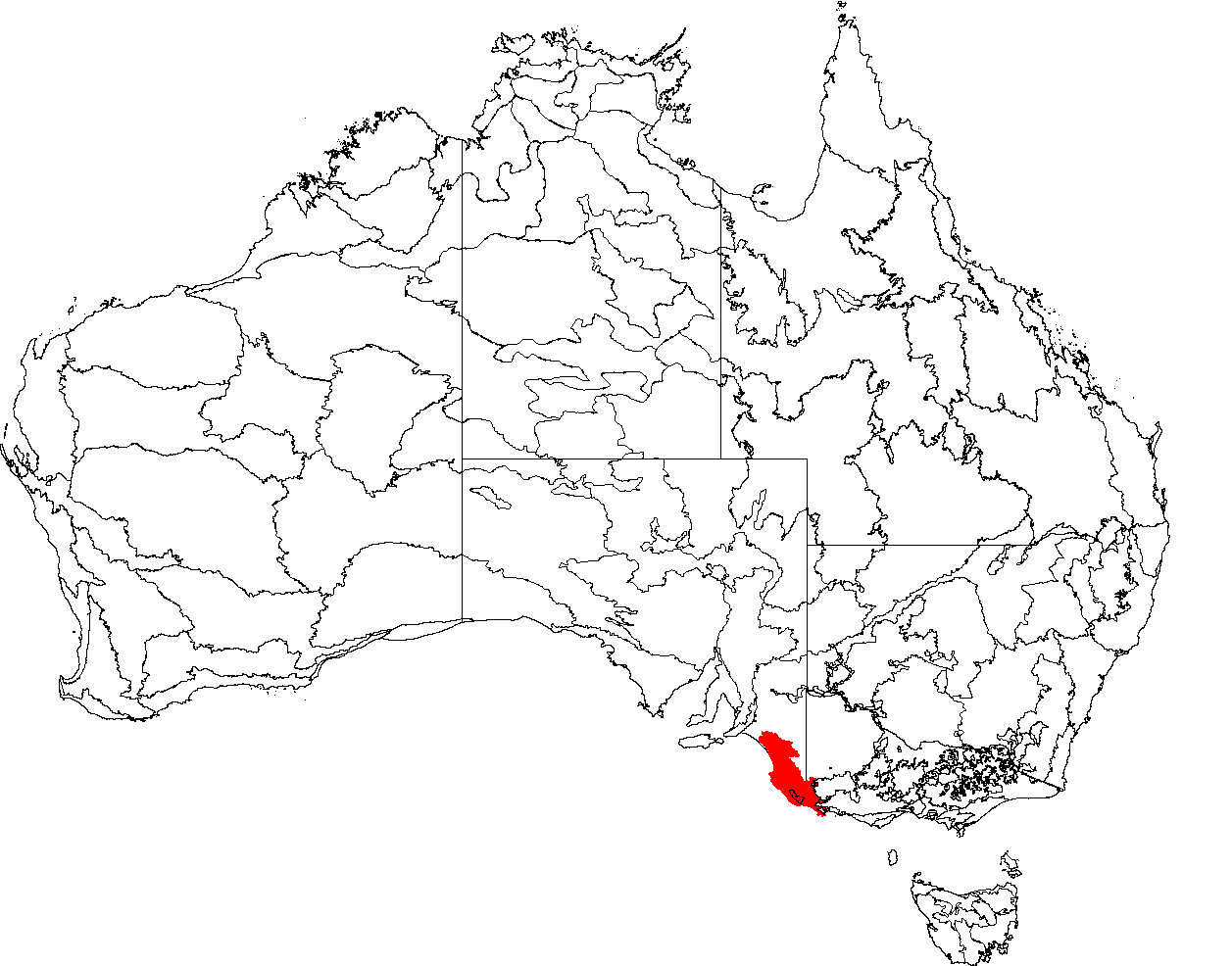
- Map of the ecoregion

Ecology
- Realm: Australasian
- Biome: Mediterranean forests, woodlands, and scrub
- Borders: Murray-Darling woodlands and mallee; Southeast Australia temperate forests

Geography
- Area: 24,431 km^{2} (9,433 sq mi)
- Country: Australia
- States: South Australia; Victoria
- Coordinates: 36.95°S 140.35°E

Conservation
- Conservation status: Critical/endangered
- Protected: 2,326 km² (10%)

The Naracoorte woodlands is an ecoregion in southern Australia. It covers the Naracoorte coastal plain in southeastern South Australia and southwestern Victoria. It is coterminous with the Naracoorte Coastal Plain IBRA region. Only 10% of the ecoregion's area still has its original vegetation; most has been converted to agriculture and pasture.

== Location and description ==
The topography is generally low, either flat or gently undulating. There are extensive coastal dunes with saltwater, brackish, and freshwater lakes and wetlands. Many of the soils are sandy. Others areas are made up of calcrete; the area is known as the Limestone Coast.

The ecoregion is bounded on the southeast by the Southeast Australia temperate forests ecoregion, and the Mount Gambier area is a western outlier of that ecoregion. The Murray-Darling woodlands and mallee lies to the north and east, and includes the Murray River estuary which bounds the Naracoorte woodlands on the north. The Great Australian Bight lies to the south and west.

== Climate ==
The ecoregion has a mild Mediterranean climate with a strong maritime influence that moderates temperature extremes. Rainfall ranges from 850 mm in the wetter southern areas to 400 mm in the driest inland and northern areas.

== Flora ==
The original vegetation includes open sclerophyll forests in areas with higher rainfall and well-drained soils, and open woodlands and shrublands in drier areas. low shrubland (heath) grew in sandy soils and stabilized dunes. Open woodlands of river red gum (Eucalyptus camaldulensis) are found in seasonally-waterlogged areas. Swamps and wet meadows of the tussock sedge Gahnia grow in the wettest areas.

== Fauna ==
The ecoregion's extensive wetlands and coastal lakes are important habitat for migratory and resident water birds.

The ecoregion has few endemic or near-endemic species. The endangered orange-bellied parrot (Neophema chrysogaster) overwinters in the vegetated coastal dunes and saltmarshes. The endangered swift parrot (Lathamus discolor) and regent honeyeater (Anthochaera phyrigia) have been mostly extirpated from habitat loss.

== Protected areas ==
A 2017 assessment found that 2,326 km^{2}, or 10%, of the ecoregion is in protected areas. Most of the protected areas are small, and preserve coastal dunes and wetlands. The more extensive ones include Coorong National Park, Messent Conservation Park, Canunda National Park, and Mount Richmond National Park.
