= Gippsland Plains Grassy Woodland =

Ecological community in southern Victoria

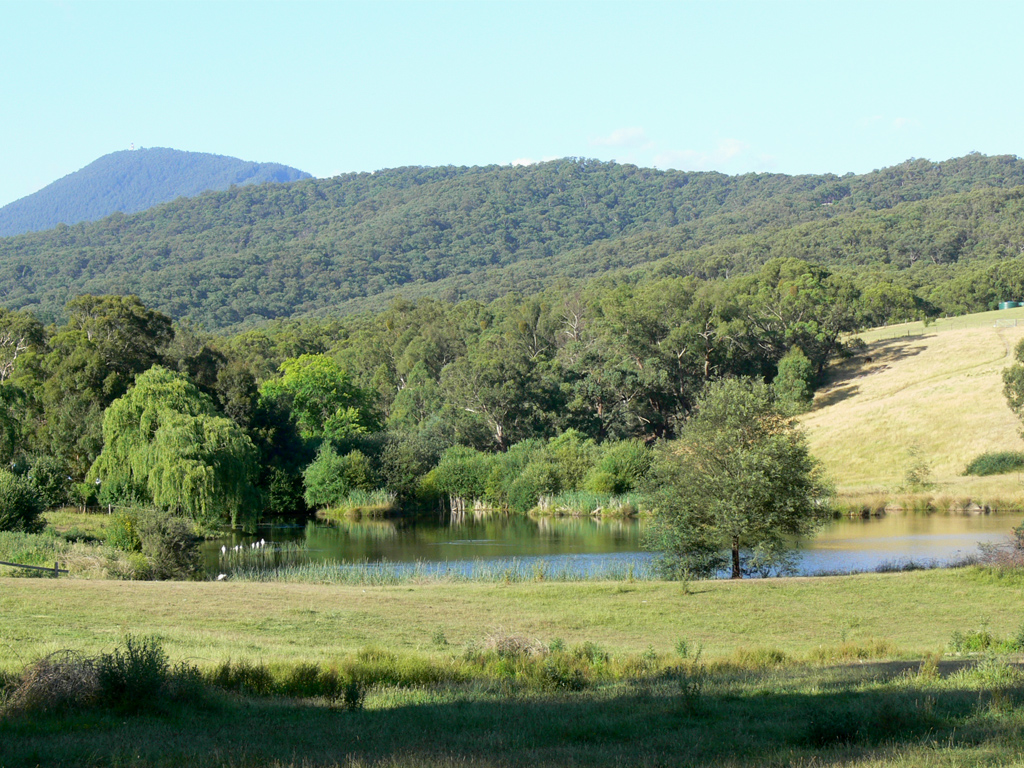

Ecology
- Realm: Australasia
- Biome: Temperate broadleaf and mixed forests
- Borders: Southeast Australia temperate savanna; Southeast Australia temperate forests; Victorian Volcanic Plain grasslands

Geography
- Area: 60,000 km^{2} (23,000 mi^{2})
- Country: Australia
- Elevation: 20–100 metres (66–328 ft)
- Coordinates: 38.1°S 147.10°E
- Climate type: Oceanic climate (Cfb)
- Soil types: Clay loam

The Gippsland Plains Grassy Woodland is an ecological temperate grassland community located in the Gippsland region in southern Victoria, Australia. Stretching from Bairnsdale in the east to the eastern portion of Melbourne in the west, they typify one of Victoria's most threatened and disconnected indigenous ecosystems. The Gippsland Red Gum Grassy Woodland is the most prominent community in the system situated in the centre.

Situated in the South East Coastal Plain, the Gippsland grasslands consist of South Gippsland Plains Grassland (east), Central Gippsland Plains Grasslands (centre) and Forest Red Gum Grassy Woodland (west) in southern Victoria, where they border Victorian Volcanic Plain grasslands in the west.

== Geography ==
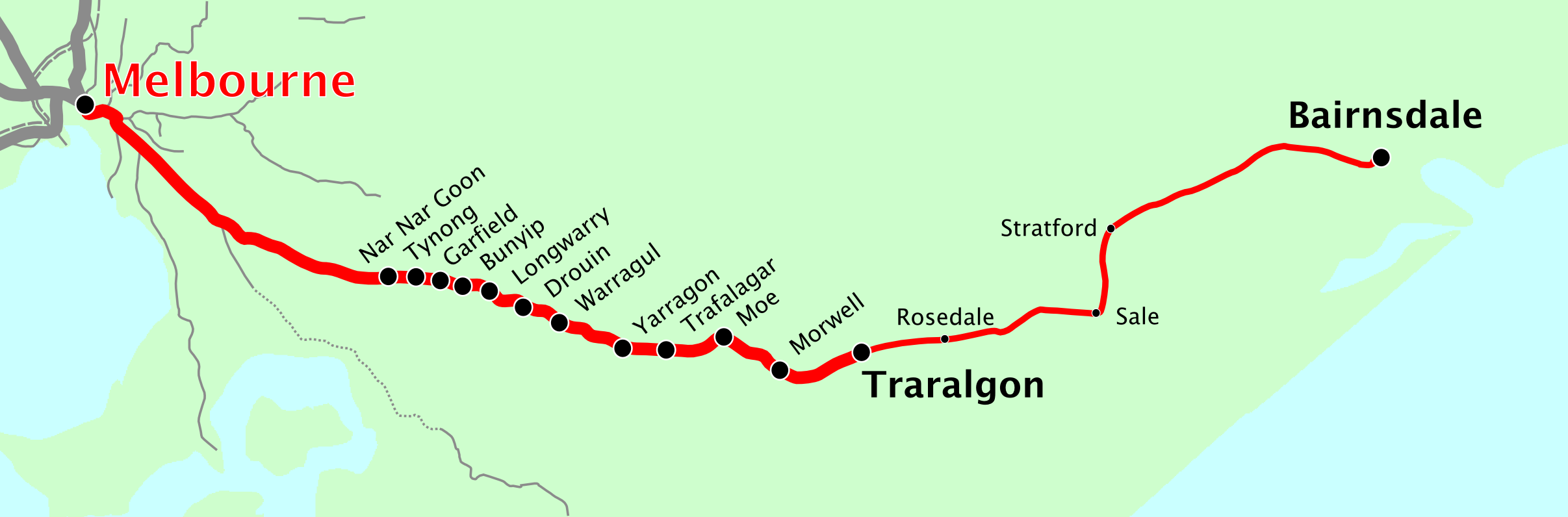
The Gippsland railway line traverses the grassy woodland.

The vegetation community was once ubiquitous across the Gippsland plain, but now only less than five per cent of its original extent remains, partly consisting of sporadic vegetation areas encircled by a mostly cleared, farming landscape. The zone is bounded by the Strzelecki Ranges to the East, the Great Dividing Range to the North and the Mornington Peninsula to the West, reaching Cranbourne and Westernport in Melbourne's east. The community caters to many nationally and state-listed threatened plants and animals.

The open grasslands of the Central Gippsland Plains used to cover about 600 km^{2} of land and the Forest Red Gum Grassy Woodland around 1200 km^{2} at the time of European settlement, but are now most likely nonexistent. The Forest Red Gum Grassy Woodland is situated on Lower Pleistocene gravels, sands, silts and clays, with some Tertiary alluvium.

The community is situated on undulating to generally flat plains that are less than 100 metres above sea level, with some presence on low hills up to 220 metres. There used to be a tree canopy, but it has mostly been cleared. Shrubs are thinly distributed in both forms, with a cover of less than 10 per cent. However, despite being mostly cleared, the community is still sparsely present on roadsides or railways, cemeteries and nature reserves.

Annual rainfall typically ranges between 570 mm and 650 mm, and elevation is relatively low at 20–40 m above sea level.

== Ecology ==
=== Trees ===
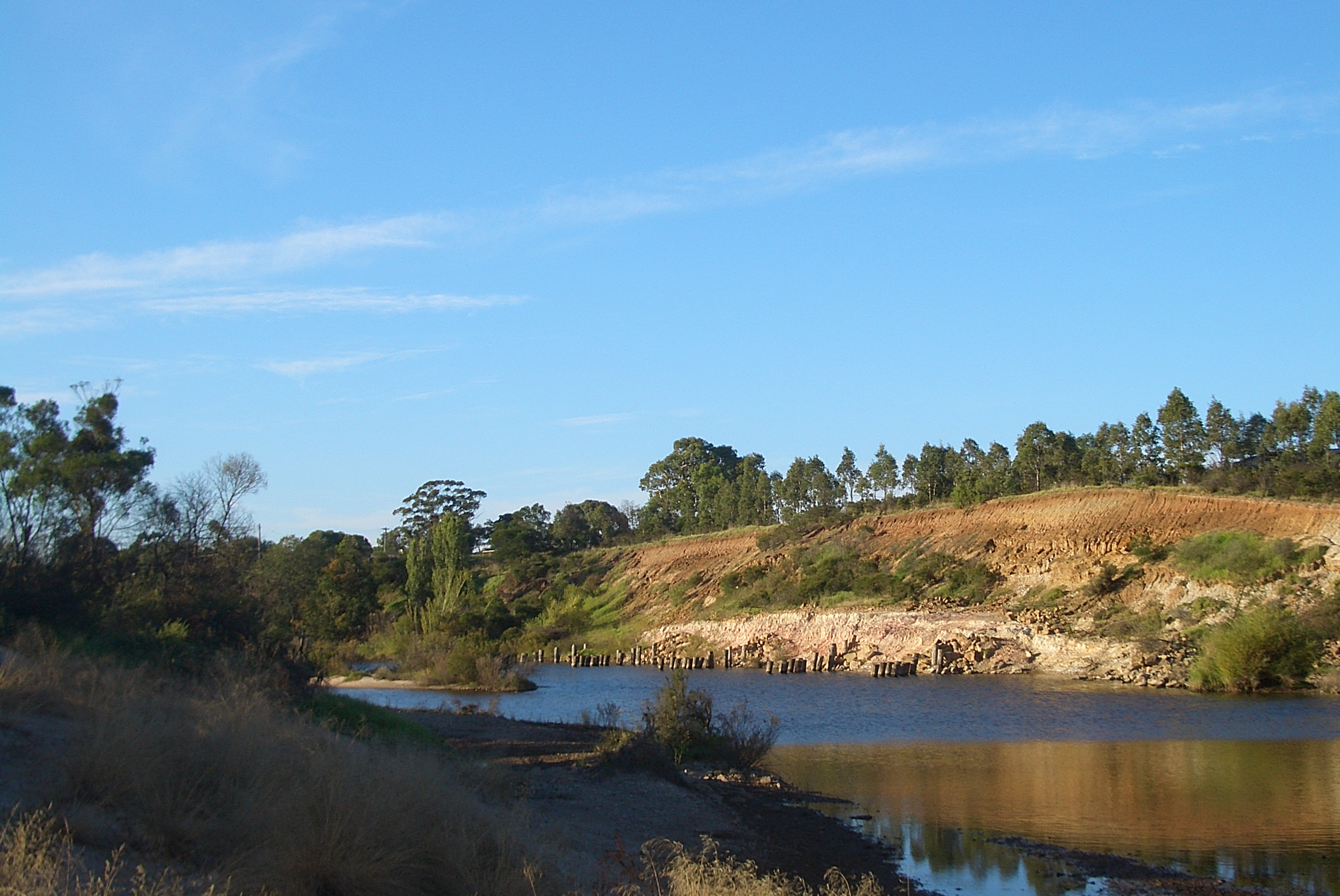
The Avon River within the grassy woodlands

The Gippsland Red Gum Grassy Woodland ecoregion is so named because Eucalyptus tereticornis is prevalent, in addition to Eucalyptus bridgesiana, Eucalyptus camaldulensis, Eucalyptus globoidea, Eucalyptus angophoroides, Eucalyptus bosistoana, Eucalyptus pauciflora, Eucalyptus melliodora and Eucalyptus polyanthemos, as well as patches of Allocasuarina littoralis, Acacia implexa, Acacia mearnsii and Allocasuarina verticillata. The South Gippsland Plains Grassland is located at wetter sites with poor soil to the south and west of the central Gippsland plain, from coastal Gippsland in the south to Traralgon, where it features thinly scattered eucalypts, such as Eucalyptus ovata and Eucalyptus viminalis. Furthermore, the New Zealand native Kunzea ericoides has invaded some parts of the grassland.

=== Groundcover ===
The groundcover features many different wildflowers, including Arthropodium strictum, Chrysocephalum apiculatum and Xerochrysum palustre, Dianella revoluta, Diuris punctata, Acaena echinata, Hypericum gramineum, Dianella amoena, Chrysocephalum apiculatum, Dichondra repens, Drosera peltata, Hydrocotyle laxiflora, Poranthera microphylla, Thysanotus patersonii, Tricoryne elatior and Wurmbea dioica, which inhabit the areas between tussocks.

Grasses include tussock grasses such as Themeda triandra, and as well as Austrodanthonia laevis, Pentapogon quadrifidus, Wahlenbergia gracilis, Austrostipa, Hypoxis hygrometrica, Lomandra filiformis, Carex breviculmis, Microlaena stipoides, Schoenus apogon, Themeda triandra, Hemarthria uncinata var. uncinata, Lachnagrostis spp. and Juncus subsecundus.

=== Animals ===
Animals include Lathamus discolor, Anthochaera phrygia, Litoria raniformis, Dasyurus maculatus and Isoodon obesulus.

== See also ==
- Coastal Valley Grassy Woodlands
