= Victorian Volcanic Plain grasslands =

Ecological community in southern Victoria

Natural Temperate Grassland of the Victorian Volcanic Plain
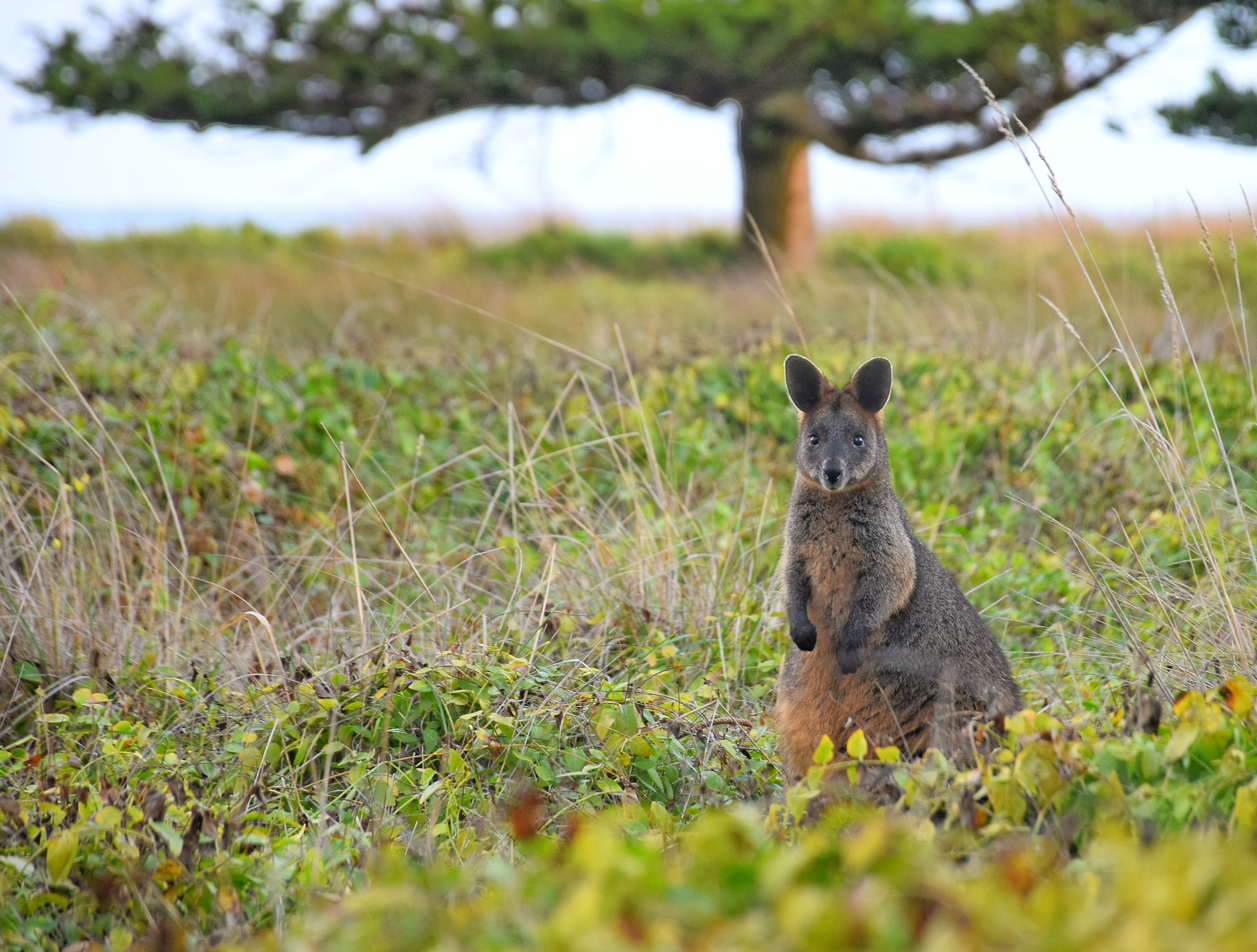
- A wallaby in the grassy plain of Griffiths Island

Ecology
- Realm: Australasia
- Biome: Temperate grasslands, savannas, and shrublands
- Borders: Southeast Australia temperate savanna; Gippsland Plains Grassy Woodland; Northern Plains Grassland

Geography
- Area: 22,000 km^{2} (8,500 mi^{2})
- Country: Australia
- Elevation: 10–50 metres (33–164 ft)
- Coordinates: 38.2°S 143.25°E
- Climate type: Oceanic climate (Cfb); Mediterranean climate (Csb) (western fringe)
- Soil types: Basalt

The Victorian Volcanic Plain Grasslands are a critically endangered temperate grasslands that occur in the Australian state of Victoria, stretching from Hamilton in the west to the city of Melbourne. Part of the Southern Volcanic Plain and bordering the Gippsland Plains Grassy Woodland to the east, the grasslands sit on Cainozoic volcanic deposits. In 2011, the Victoria State Government had reserved 15,000 hectares of land to protect the critically endangered community. Only less than 5% of the pre-European concentration of the grasslands remain.

== Geography ==
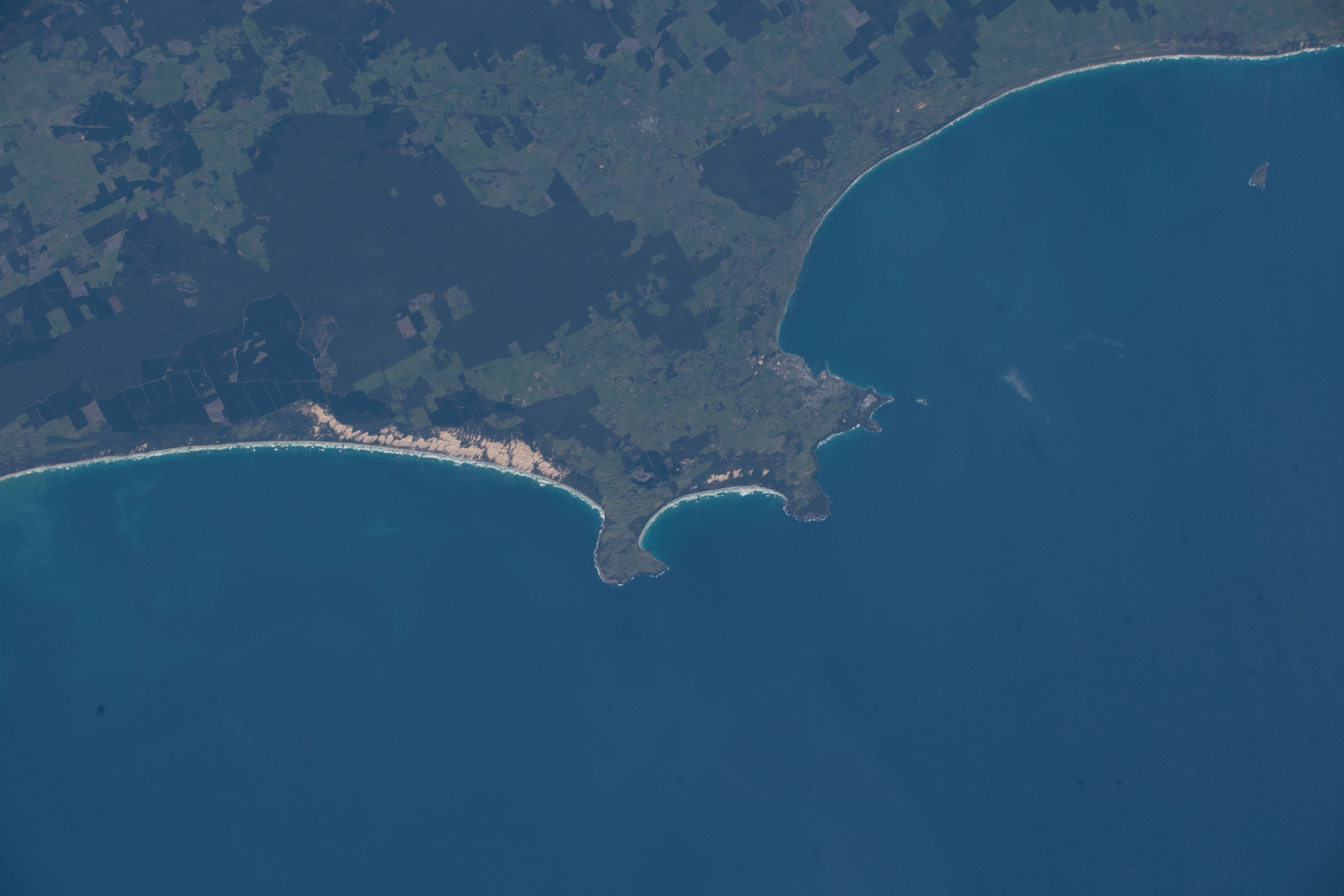
Barwon South West region, which features a portion of the grasslands.

The Victorian grasslands stretch 350 km (220 mi) west, from Melbourne (around Doreen) in the east, to Portland in the southwest, reaching the border of South Australia, on a flat to mildly undulating country at low altitudes, where they feature a belt around 100 km (62 mi) wide, covering approximately 20,000 square kilometres. The soils in the grassland are susceptible to cracking during drought and being miry in wet periods. Grazing and bushfires have an impact as well. The grasslands also include the Natural Damp Grassland of the Victorian Coastal Plains.

The grasslands were once a large vegetation zone on the volcanic plain, but they have since been reduced to a small, highly divided remnants in a landscape that has been mostly cleared for agriculture. The area is dominated tussock grass alongside wildflowers (which make up 50% of the total landcover), with very few trees and shrubs. The grasslands feature dry warm summers and cool, wet winters. Annual rainfall ranges from 400 mm (15.75 in) to 1,000 mm (39.37 in) a year.

== Biodiversity ==
In addition to kangaroo grass, Plume grass, Wallaby-grasses and Spear grasses, the area includes Spiny Rice flower, common tussock grass, Hoary Sunray, Eryngium ovinum, Acaena echinata, Button Wrinklewort, Leptorhynchos squamatus, purple clover, Convolvulus angustissimus, Schoenus apogon and as well as native orchids, lilies, daisies and peas. In wetter places, such as in the west, species that are more prevalent include Microtis unifolia and Drosera peltata. In drier regions, Chrysocephalum apiculatum and Calocephalus citreus are more common.

Native animals include striped legless lizard, Tussock Skink, common dunnart, Southern Grass Skink, eastern barred bandicoot, Golden Sun Moth, growling grass frog, eastern grey kangaroo and grassland earless dragon.
