= Eucalyptus × nepeanensis =

Scientific classification
- Kingdom: Plantae
- Clade: Tracheophytes
- Clade: Angiosperms
- Clade: Eudicots
- Clade: Rosids
- Order: Myrtales
- Family: Myrtaceae
- Genus: Eucalyptus
- Species: E. × nepeanensis

Binomial name
- Eucalyptus × nepeanensis R.T.Baker & H.G.Sm.

Species of eucalyptus

Eucalyptus × nepeanensis is a species of medium-sized tree with fibrous or flaky "box-type" bark on the lower trunk, lance-shaped leaves that are the same shade of green on both sides, flower buds in leaf axils in groups of six or more, and hemispherical to pear-shaped fruit.

== Taxonomy ==
Eucalyptus × nepeanensis was first described in 1920 by Richard Thomas Baker and Henry George Smith who gave it the name Eucalyptus nepeanensis from specimens collected at St Marys. The description was published in their book, A Research on the Eucalypts especially in regard to their Essential Oils.

In 1922, Joseph Maiden listed the name as a synonym of Eucalyptus bosistoana in his book, A Critical Revision of the Genus Eucalyptus.

In 1988, George Chippendale listed E. nepeanensis as a "probable hybrid", in Volume 19 of Flora of Australia.

The name Eucalyptus × nepeanensis is accepted by the Australian Plant Census.
