= Southern Volcanic Plain =

- Region
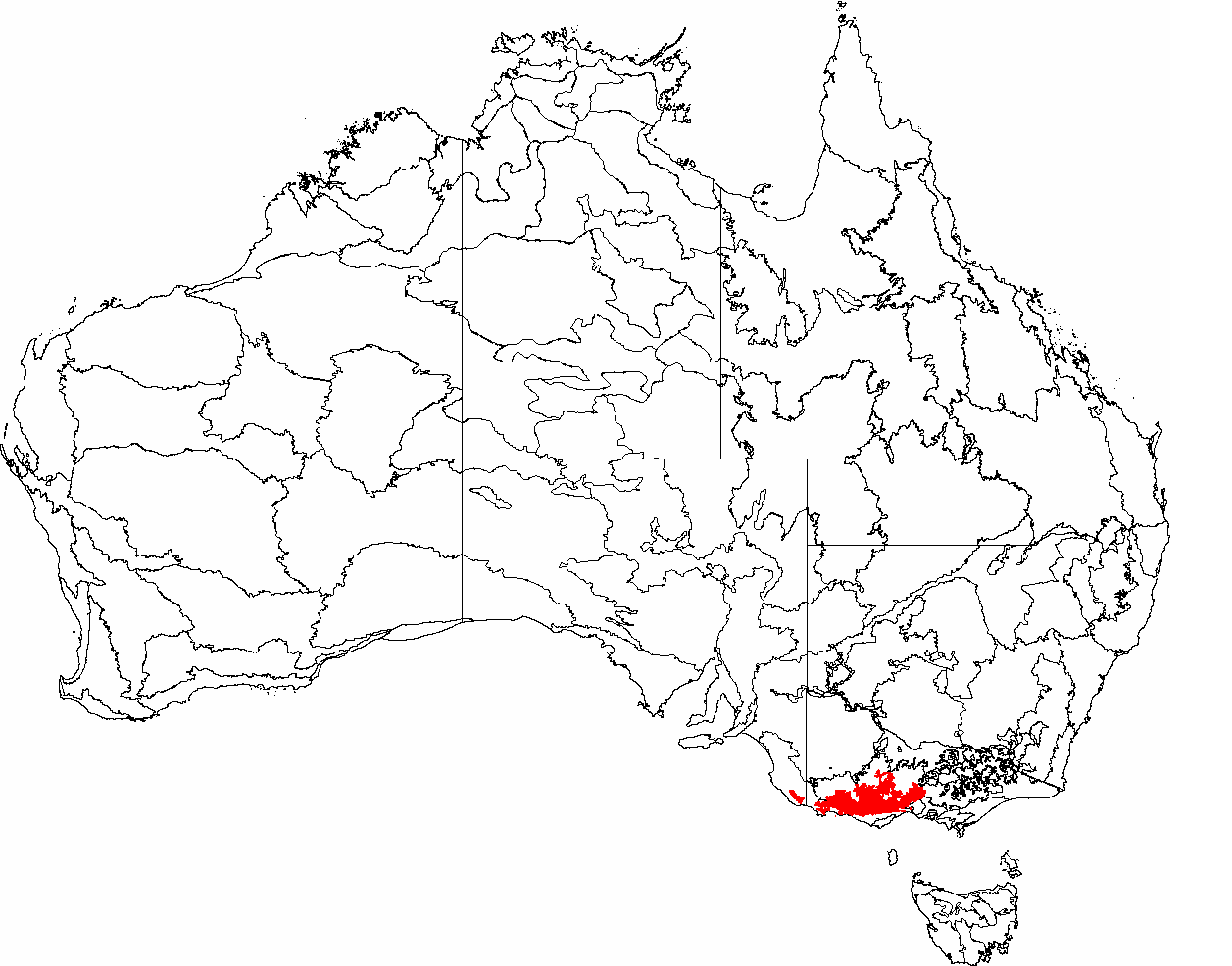
- The interim Australian bioregions, with the Southern Volcanic Plain in red
- Country: Australia
- State: Australia

Area
  - Total: 24,403.4 km^{2} (9,422.2 sq mi)
Localities around Southern Volcanic Plain
Victorian Midlands	Victorian Midlands	Victorian Midlands
Naracoorte Coastal Plain	Southern Volcanic Plain	South Eastern Highlands
South East Coastal Plain	South East Coastal Plain	South East Coastal Plain

The Southern Volcanic Plain is an interim Australian bioregion located in western Victoria and south-eastern South Australia. It has an area of 2,440,340 hectares (6,030,200 acres). The Southern Volcanic Plain bioregion is part of the Southeast Australia temperate forests ecoregion. The Natural Temperate Grassland of the Victorian Volcanic Plain lies on the plain.

== Subregions ==
The Southern Plains bioregion consists of two subregions:

- Victorian Volcanic Plain (SVP01) – 2,356,147 hectares (5,822,170 acres)
- Mount Gambier (SVP02) – 84,194 hectares (208,050 acres)
