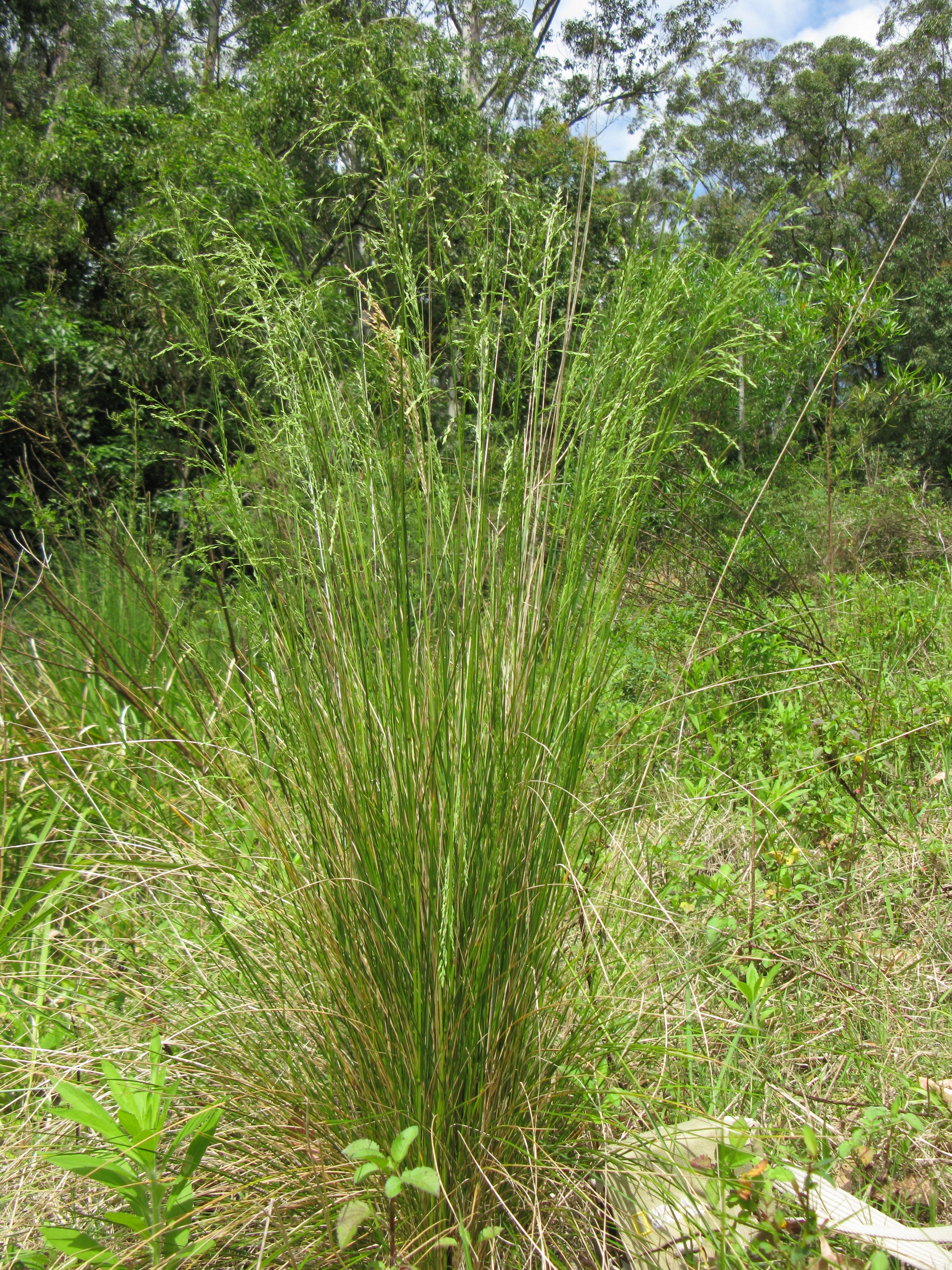

Scientific classification
- Kingdom: Plantae
- Clade: Tracheophytes
- Clade: Angiosperms
- Clade: Monocots
- Clade: Commelinids
- Order: Poales
- Family: Poaceae
- Subfamily: Pooideae
- Genus: Poa
- Species: P. labillardierei

Binomial name
- Poa labillardierei Steud.

= Poa labillardierei =

Species of tussock grass

Poa labillardierei, also known as common tussock-grass, is a species of tussock grass that is endemic to Australia. It is found in southern and eastern Australia, including Tasmania. There are differing variations, Poa labillardierei var. acris Vickery and Poa labillardierei var. labillardierei.

The species was formally described in 1854 by German botanist and physician Ernst Gottlieb von Steudel in Synopsis Plantarum Glumacearum. The name is derived from Poa - Greek word which means "fodder" and labillardierei - after the French botanist and explorer, J.J.H. de Labillardière.

== Habitat ==
Poa labillardierei is most commonly growing in open forest communities, grassy woodland communities and in moister areas on low slopes and valley floors that are frequently wet. They also grow on river flats and can extend up open sheltered slopes. This plant is additionally frost tolerant.

Poa labillardierei is also very commonly used within home gardens and landscaping. It is a vigorous and tolerant grass, adding vertical interest in landscaping settings. Poa labillardierei regenerates well after burning but the fire should not be very hot for a long time.

== Distribution ==
Poa labillardierei is found in southern and eastern Australia, including Tasmania.

== Description ==
Poa labillardierei is a dense coarsely tufted grasses and can reach a height of 120 cm. The large grass is a perennial, that germinates from seed or division.

Leaves mostly basal, very long; sheath usually pallid at the base, upper ± scabrous; ligule c. 0.5 mm long, truncate; blade to 80 cm long, flat or inrolled, to 3.5 mm wide, scabrous, moderately rigid, tip fine, setaceous. Poa labillardierei flowers in spring to summer. Inflorescences are 10–25 cm long, with erect or erectly and loosely spreading branches. Spikelets 3–4(–8)-flowered, strongly laterally compressed. Glumes broad to rather narrow, subacute to occasionally subacuminate. Lemmas firm, narrow to moderately broad, usually hairy, web usually copious, consisting of long hairs; palea firm, closely scabrous on the keels.

== Propagation ==
Poa labillardierei can be propagated by division and germinates readily from seed, into prepared soil in autumn and winter. The seedlings cannot grow in an area of continuous dry climate and needs moist soil to establish, but can germinate in frost and can tolerate a temperature in the 0 to -5 °C range. It has a very fast growth rate, and once established, it needs very low maintenance and no irrigation.

== Ecology ==
The common tussock-grass can form the dominant ground layer in grasslands of South-East Australia. Examples include in the Victorian Volcanic Plains, and Gippsland Plains Grassy Woodland. This is in part due to its ability to regenerate well after fire and outcompete other species.

Common tussock grass also provides excellent habitat for invertebrates, both in abundance and species richness. A study comparing plantings in urban parks that were either indigenous (with species endemic to an area), native or non-native discovered one patch of Poa labillardierei supported more indigenous insect species than any other plant, across all groups, suggesting that it is an ideal species to support biodiversity, especially in urban settings with a lack of invertebrates.

Reptiles also rely on habitat provided by common tussock grass, including the tussock skink, and blue tongue lizard.

== First Nation's uses ==
The long leaves and stems of Poa labillardierei are used as string for basket making.

Indigenous names include; Bobat (Woi wurrung) and Bowat (Wurundjeri).
