= South East Coastal Plain =

- Region
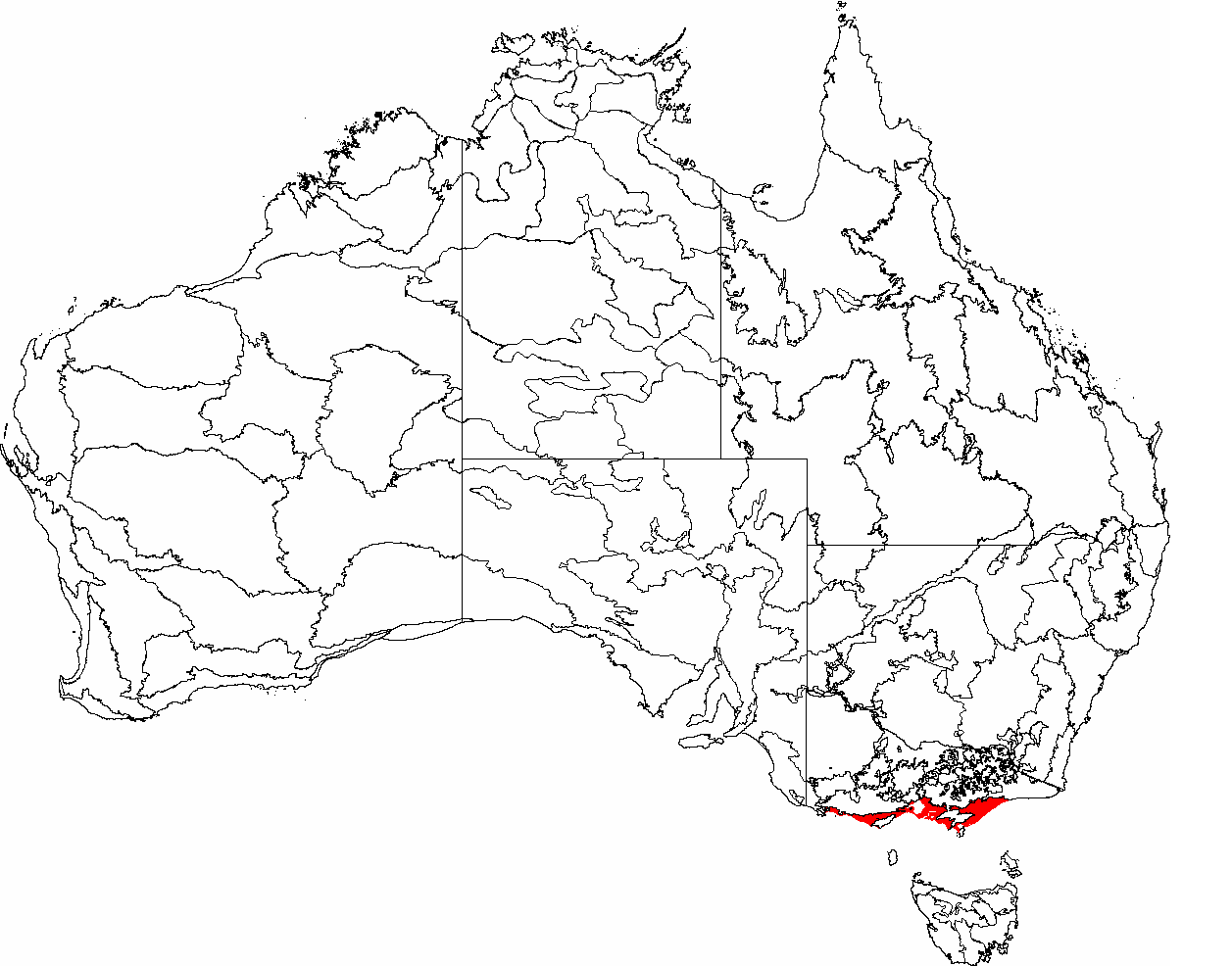
- The interim Australian bioregions, with the South East Coastal Plain in red
- Country: Australia
- State: Victoria

Area
  - Total: 17,492.37 km^{2} (6,753.84 sq mi)
Localities around South East Coastal Plain
Southern Volcanic Plain	Southern Volcanic Plain	South Eastern Highlands
Southern Ocean	South East Coastal Plain	South East Corner
South Eastern Highlands	Bass Strait	Bass Strait

The South East Coastal Plain is an interim Australian bioregion located in coastal southern Victoria. It has an area of 1,749,237 hectares (4,322,460 acres). The South East Coastal Plain bioregion is part of the Southeast Australia temperate forests ecoregion and also features the Gippsland Plains Grassy Woodland.

== Subregions ==
The Southern Plains bioregion consists of three subregions:

- Gippsland Plain (SCP01) – 1,246,995 hectares (3,081,390 acres)
- Otway Plain (SCP02) – 237,799 hectares (587,610 acres)
- Warrnambool Plain (SCP03) – 264,443 hectares (653,450 acres)
