= Victorian Midlands =

- Region
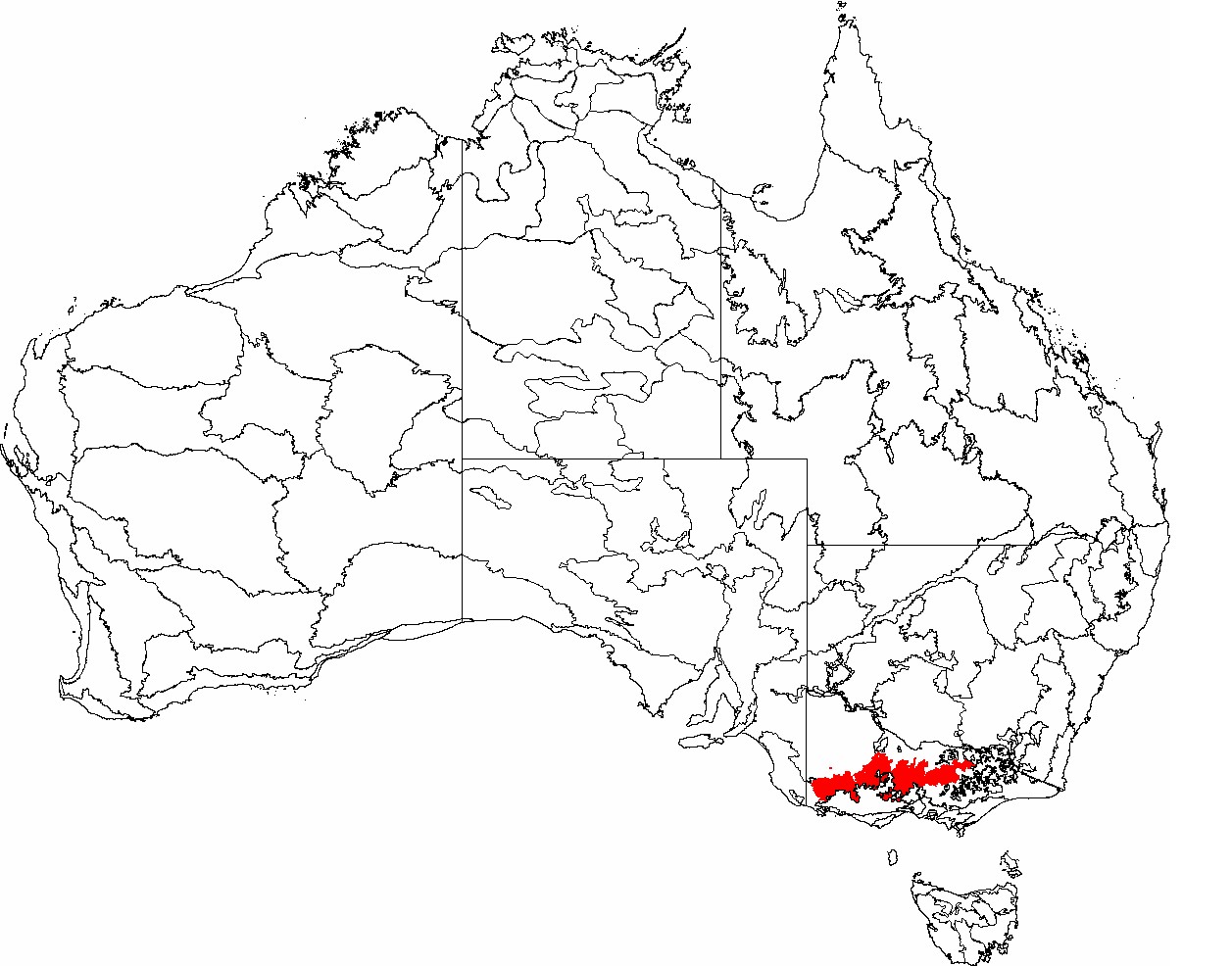
- The interim Australian bioregions, with the Victorian Midlands in red
- Country: Australia
- State: Victoria

Area
  - Total: 34,697.89 km^{2} (13,396.93 sq mi)
Localities around Victorian Midlands
Murray Darling Depression	Riverina	Riverina
Naracoorte Coastal Plain	Victorian Midlands	South Eastern Highlands
Southern Volcanic Plain	Southern Volcanic Plain	South Eastern Highlands

The Victorian Midlands is an interim Australian bioregion located in central Victoria. It has an area of 3,469,789 hectares (8,574,040 acres). The Victorian Midlands bioregion is part of the Southeast Australia temperate forests ecoregion.

== Subregions ==
The Victorian Midlands bioregion consists of four subregions:

- Goldfields (VIM01) – 1,326,133 hectares (3,276,950 acres)
- Central Victorian Uplands (VIM02) – 1,217,922 hectares (3,009,550 acres)
- Greater Grampians (VIM03) – 237,416 hectares (586,670 acres)
- Dundas Tablelands (VIM04) – 688,318 hectares (1,700,870 acres)
