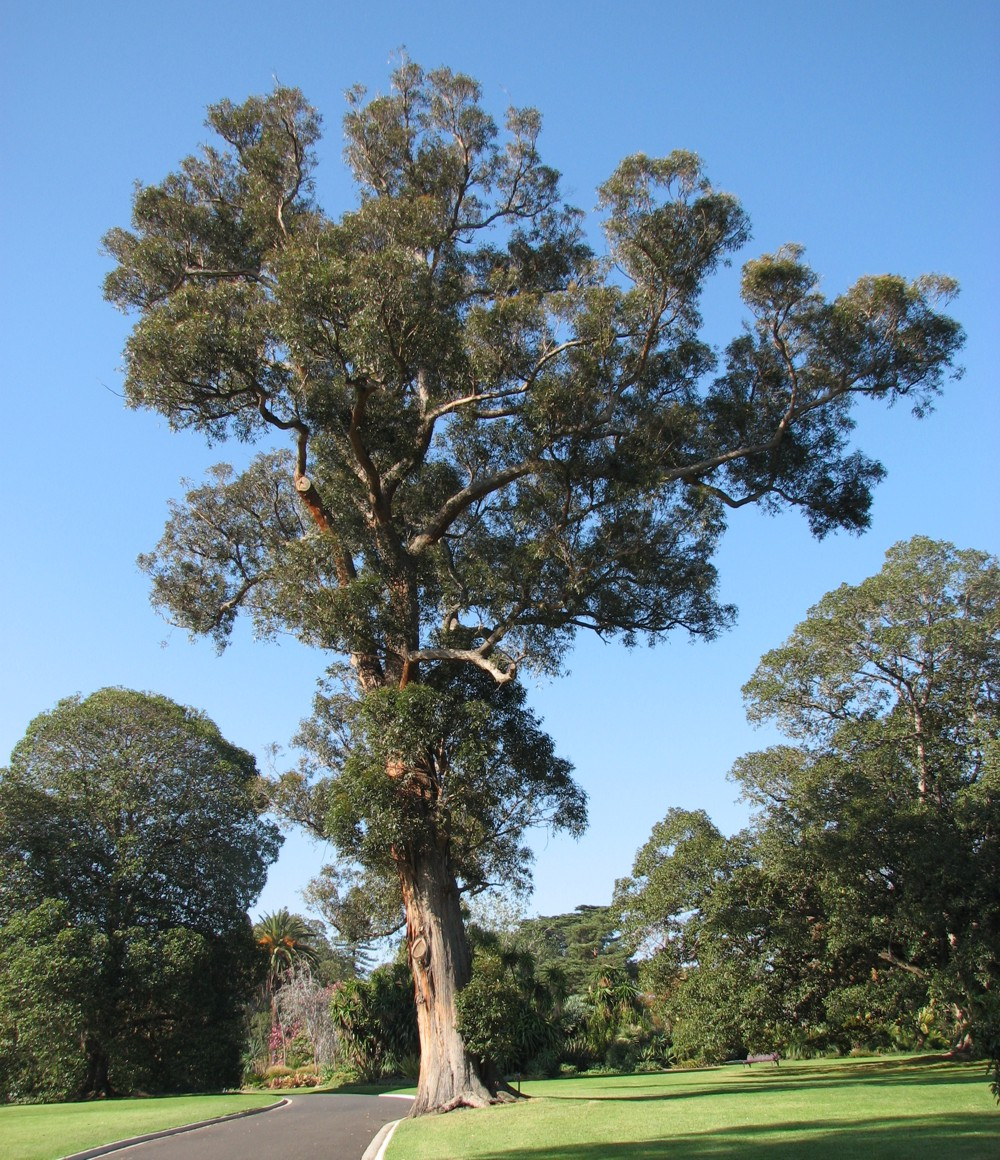
- Eucalyptus muelleriana in the Royal Botanic Garden, Melbourne

Conservation status
- Least Concern (IUCN 3.1)

Scientific classification
- Kingdom: Plantae
- Clade: Embryophytes
- Clade: Tracheophytes
- Clade: Spermatophytes
- Clade: Angiosperms
- Clade: Eudicots
- Clade: Rosids
- Order: Myrtales
- Family: Myrtaceae
- Genus: Eucalyptus
- Species: E. muelleriana

Binomial name
- Eucalyptus muelleriana A.W.Howitt

Synonyms
- Eucalyptus dextropinea R.T.Baker; Eucalyptus muellerana S.W.L.Jacobs & J.Pickard orth. var.; Eucalyptus pilularis var. muelleriana (A.W.Howitt) Maiden

= Eucalyptus muelleriana =

Yellow stringybark

Species of eucalyptus

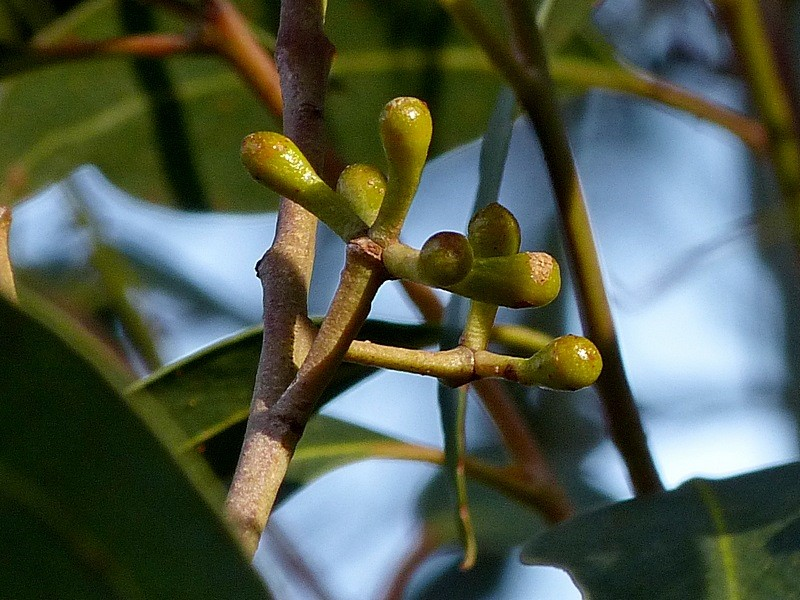
Flower buds

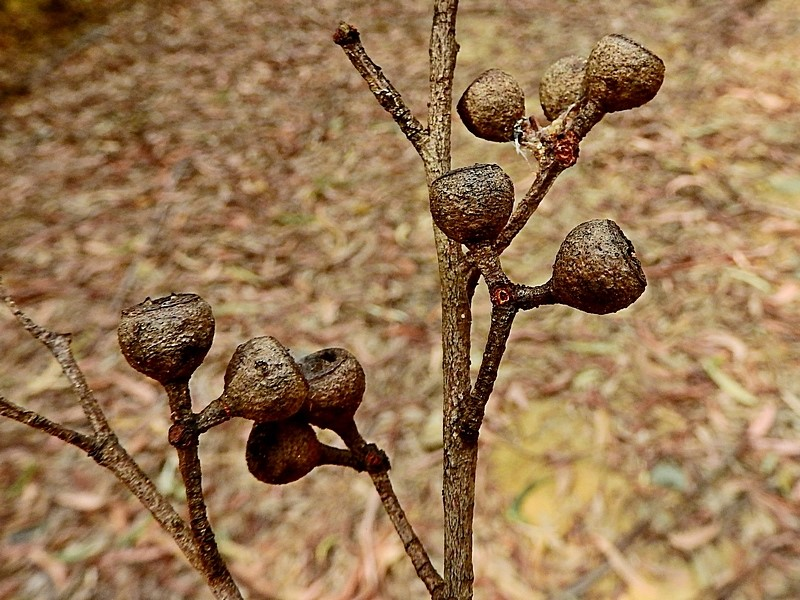
Fruit

Eucalyptus muelleriana, commonly known as yellow stringybark, is a species of medium-sized to tall tree that is endemic to southeastern Australia. It has rough, stringy bark on the trunk and branches, lance-shaped to curved adult leaves, flower buds in groups of between seven and eleven, white flowers and cup-shaped to shortened spherical fruit.

== Description ==
Eucalyptus muelleriana is a tree that typically grows to a height of 40 m (130 ft) and forms a lignotuber. It has rough, stringy, greyish bark from the base of the trunk to the thinnest branches. Young plants and coppice regrowth have lance-shaped leaves that are glossy dark green on the upper surface, paler below, 55–135 mm (2.2–5.3 in) long, 10–50 mm (0.39–1.97 in) wide and petiolate. Adult leaves are lance-shaped to curved, glossy green but slightly paler on the lower surface, 80–200 mm (3.1–7.9 in) long and 14–45 mm (0.55–1.77 in) wide on a petiole 5–20 mm (0.20–0.79 in) long. The flower buds are arranged in leaf axils in groups of seven, nine or eleven on an unbranched peduncle 5–20 mm (0.20–0.79 in) long, the individual buds on pedicels 2–5 mm (0.079–0.197 in) long. Mature buds are oval, 5–7 mm (0.20–0.28 in) long and 3–4 mm (0.12–0.16 in) wide with a conical to rounded operculum. Flowering occurs between January and May and the flowers are white. The fruit is a woody, cup-shortened to shortened spherical capsule 6–10 mm (0.24–0.39 in) long and 7–12 mm (0.28–0.47 in) wide with the valves level with the rim or slightly protruding.

== Taxonomy and naming ==
Eucalyptus muelleriana was first formally described in 1891 by Alfred William Howitt in Transactions of the Royal Society of Victoria. The specific epithet honours Ferdinand von Mueller.

== Distribution and habitat ==
Yellow stringbark grows in wet forests on coastal plains, ranges and escarpments from Wollongong in New South Wales to Wilsons Promontory in Victoria. It has also been planted in New Zealand.

== Uses ==
Yellow stringbark provides a valuable timber which is strong, durable, straight-grained and has been widely used, particularly in Victoria for posts and piles. When planted, it prefers sandy loam / clay loam soils and at least 800 mm of annual rainfall.

== See also ==
- List of Eucalyptus species
