= Globoidnan A =

Names
- Preferred IUPAC name (2R)-3-(3,4-Dihydroxyphenyl)-2-{[4-(3,4-dihydroxyphenyl)-6,7-dihydroxynaphthalene-2-carbonyl]oxy}propanoic acid

Identifiers
| CAS Number | 827322-48-5 |
| 3D model (JSmol) | Interactive image |
| ChemSpider | 26333277 |
| PubChem CID | 3013628 |
| UNII | 8UFJ4K6MGW |
| CompTox Dashboard (EPA) | DTXSID60895853 |
- InChI: InChI=1S/C26H20O10/c27-18-3-1-12(5-20(18)29)6-24(25(33)34)36-26(35)15-7-14-10-22(31)23(32)11-17(14)16(8-15)13-2-4-19(28)21(30)9-13/h1-5,7-11,24,27-32H,6H2,(H,33,34)/t24-/m1/s1 Key: DHZIDIIBBCIIEG-XMMPIXPASA-N; InChI=1/C26H20O10/c27-18-3-1-12(5-20(18)29)6-24(25(33)34)36-26(35)15-7-14-10-22(31)23(32)11-17(14)16(8-15)13-2-4-19(28)21(30)9-13/h1-5,7-11,24,27-32H,6H2,(H,33,34)/t24-/m1/s1 Key: DHZIDIIBBCIIEG-XMMPIXPABS
- SMILES: c1cc(c(cc1C[C@H](C(=O)O)OC(=O)c2cc3cc(c(cc3c(c2)c4ccc(c(c4)O)O)O)O)O)O

Properties
| Chemical formula | C_{26}H_{20}O_{10} |
| Molar mass | 492.436 g·mol^{−1} |
- Except where otherwise noted, data are given for materials in their standard state (at 25 °C [77 °F], 100 kPa). verify (what is ?) Infobox references

Globoidnan A is a lignan found in Eucalyptus globoidea, a tree native to Australia.

The molecule has been found to weakly inhibit the action of HIV integrase (IC_{50} = 0.64 μM) in vitro. HIV integrase is an enzyme which is responsible for the introduction of HIV viral DNA into a host's cellular DNA. It is not known that globoidnan A inhibits the action of other retroviral integrases.
