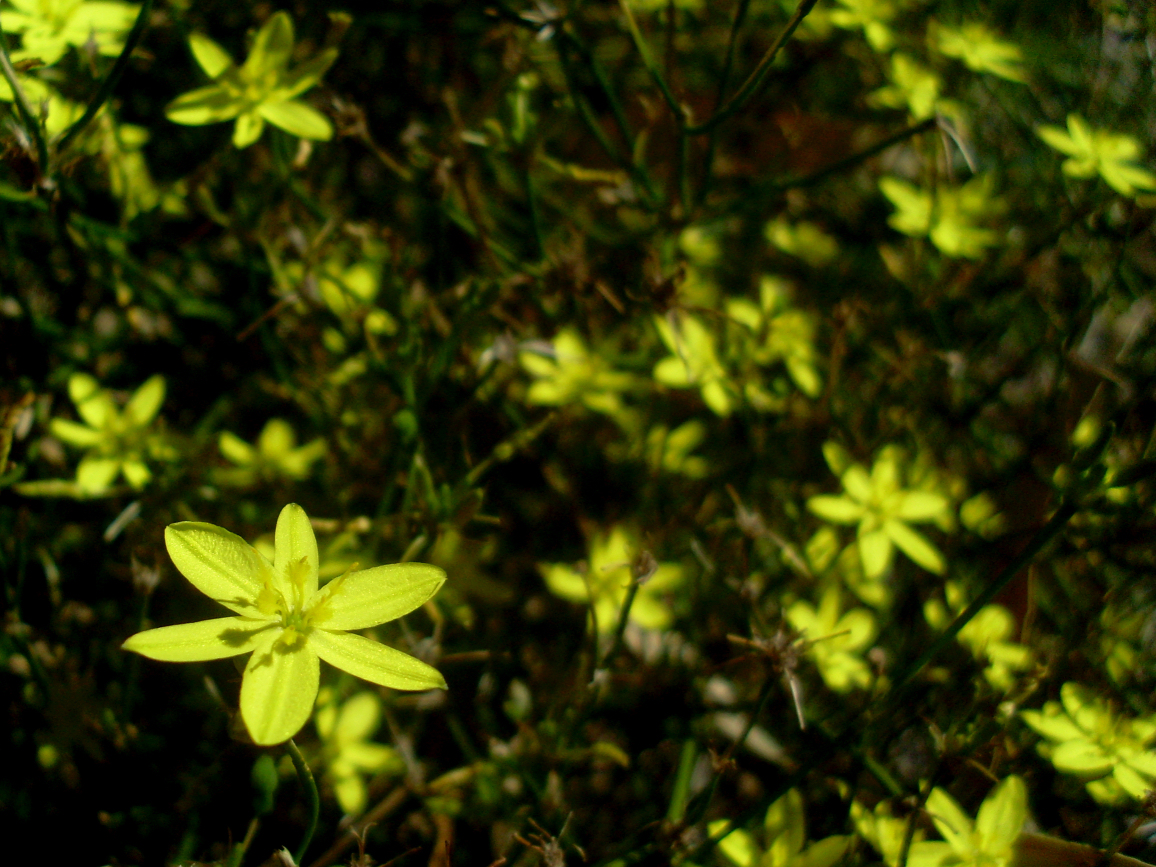
- Tricoryne elatior

Scientific classification
- Kingdom: Plantae
- Clade: Tracheophytes
- Clade: Angiosperms
- Clade: Monocots
- Order: Asparagales
- Family: Asphodelaceae
- Subfamily: Hemerocallidoideae
- Genus: Tricoryne; R.Br.

= Tricoryne =

Genus of flowering plants

Tricoryne is a genus of perennial herbs in the family Asphodelaceae, subfamily Hemerocallidoideae. All species are native to Australia with two species extending to New Guinea; within Australia they occur in all 6 states and the Northern Territory.

Species

- Tricoryne anceps R.Br. - New Guinea, Queensland
- Tricoryne corynothecoides Keighery - Western Australia
- Tricoryne elatior R.Br. - Yellow Rush-lily - all 6 states plus Northern Territory
- Tricoryne humilis Endl. - Western Australia
- Tricoryne muricata Baker - Queensland
- Tricoryne platyptera Rchb.f - New Guinea, Queensland
- Tricoryne simplex R.Br. - New South Wales
- Tricoryne tenella R.Br. - Mallee Rush-lily - Western Australia, South Australia (including Kangaroo Island)
