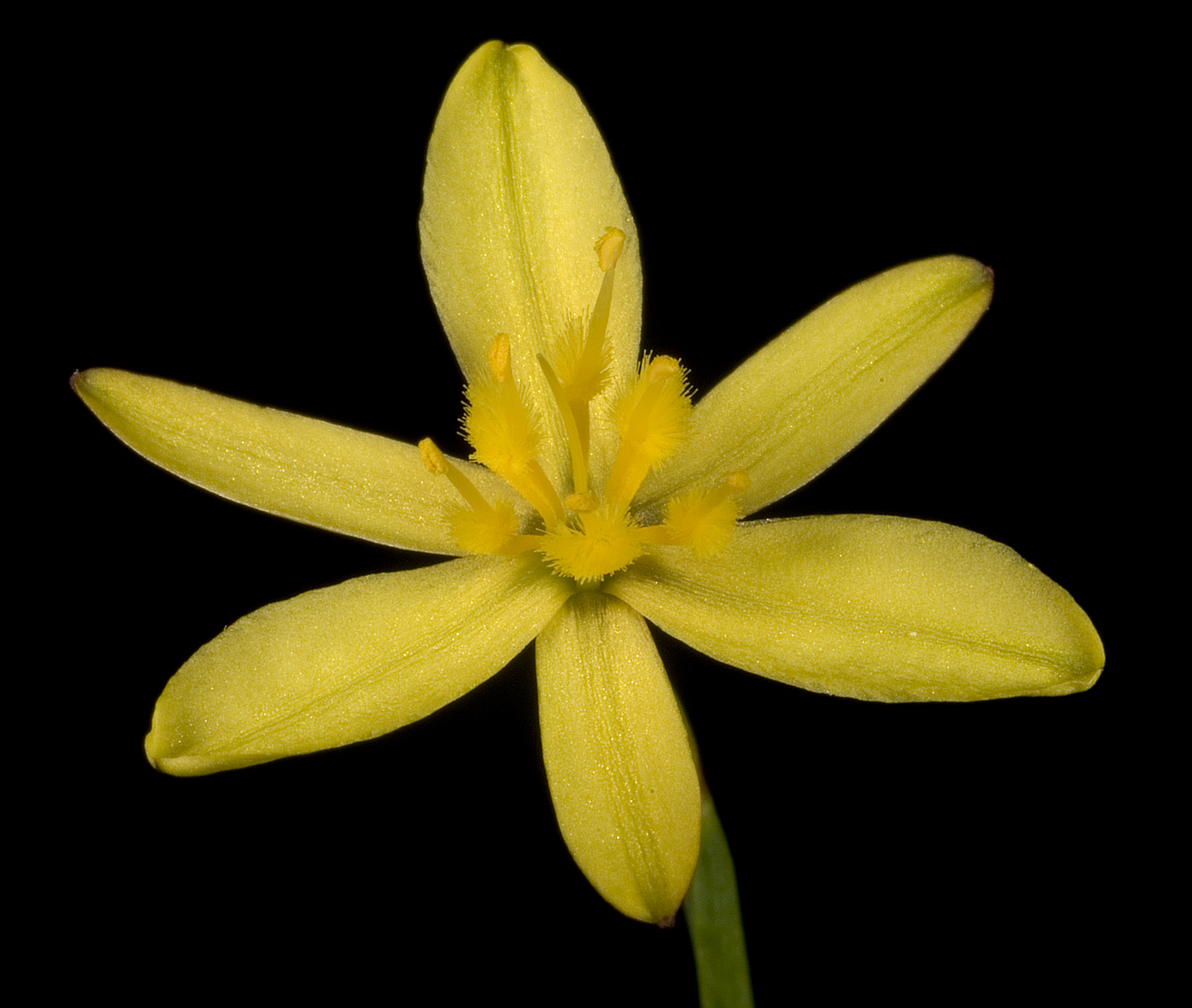

Scientific classification
- Kingdom: Plantae
- Clade: Tracheophytes
- Clade: Angiosperms
- Clade: Monocots
- Order: Asparagales
- Family: Asphodelaceae
- Subfamily: Hemerocallidoideae
- Genus: Tricoryne
- Species: T. tenella

Binomial name
- Tricoryne tenella R.Br.

= Tricoryne tenella =

Species of flowering plant

Tricoryne tenella is a species of flowering plant in the family Asphodelaceae.
