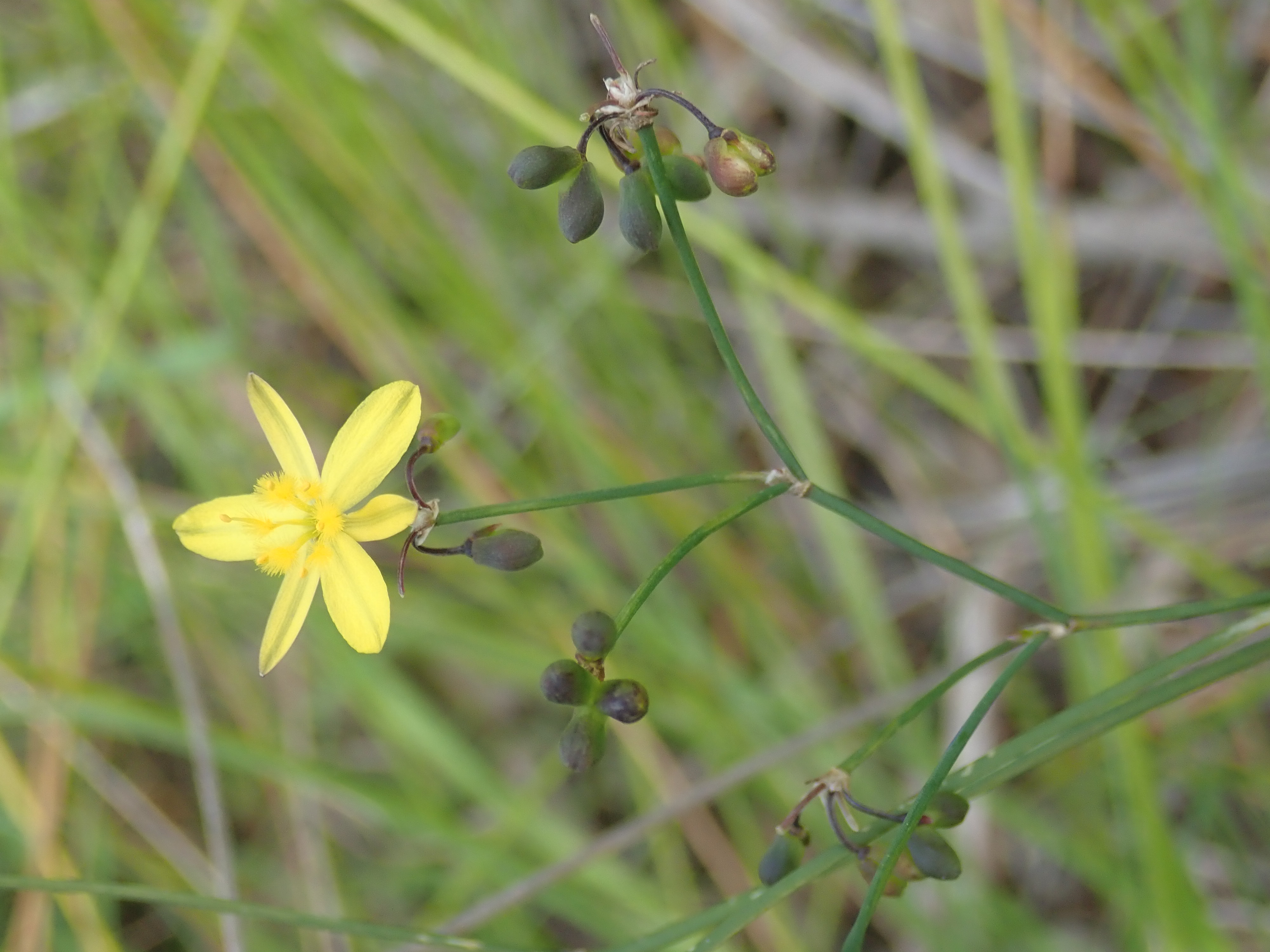

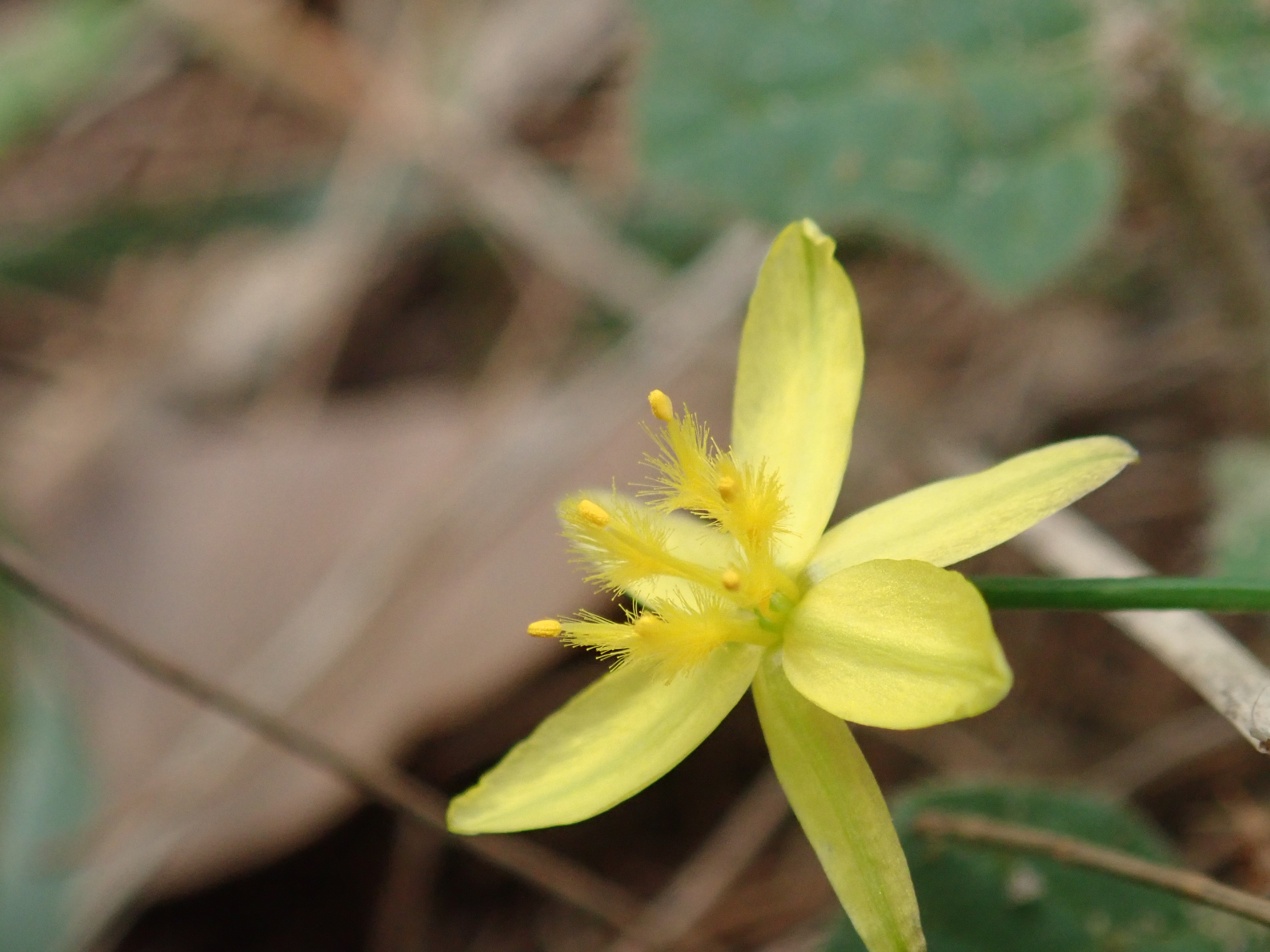

Scientific classification
- Kingdom: Plantae
- Clade: Tracheophytes
- Clade: Angiosperms
- Clade: Monocots
- Order: Asparagales
- Family: Asphodelaceae
- Subfamily: Hemerocallidoideae
- Genus: Tricoryne
- Species: T. elatior

Binomial name
- Tricoryne elatior R.Br.

Synonyms
- Tricoryne elatior var. decipiens Domin; Tricoryne elatior var. muricatula Domin; Tricoryne elatior var. scabra (R.Br.) R.T.Baker; Tricoryne elatior var. typica Domin; Tricoryne scabra R.Br.

= Tricoryne elatior =

Species of plant

Tricoryne elatior (common name yellow autumn-lily, yellow rush-lily) is a species of flowering plant in the family Asphodelaceae, native to Australia, and found in all its states and territories.

== Description ==
Tricoryne elatior is a rhizomatous perennial herb, with fibrous roots, It grows to a height of 10-40 cm but sometimes grows to 1 m. The leaves are linear, 5–10 cm by 1–3.5 mm wide, and usually glabrous. The flowering axis is terete, and has a smooth surface although sometimes there are scabrous hairs at the axis base. The umbels carry 2–10 flowers on pedicels which are about 1.5–6 mm long. The outer tepals are oblong, acute, three-veined, and 6–14 mm by 1.5–3 mm, while the inner tepals are elliptic, obtuse, three-veined, and 5–10 mm by 3–4 mm wide. The tepals twist spirally after flowering and later fall. There are six stamens which are attached to the base of the perianth. The filaments are 3–6 mm long with tufts of clavate hairs below the anthers (which are ovate, and 0.6–0.9 mm long). The mericarps are ellipsoidal, and 3–6 mm by 1.5–3.5 mm and slightly reticulate.

== Habitat ==
It is found in sclerophyll forests, in heaths and woodlands, and sometimes in swamps, growing on sandy loams and lateritic soils.
