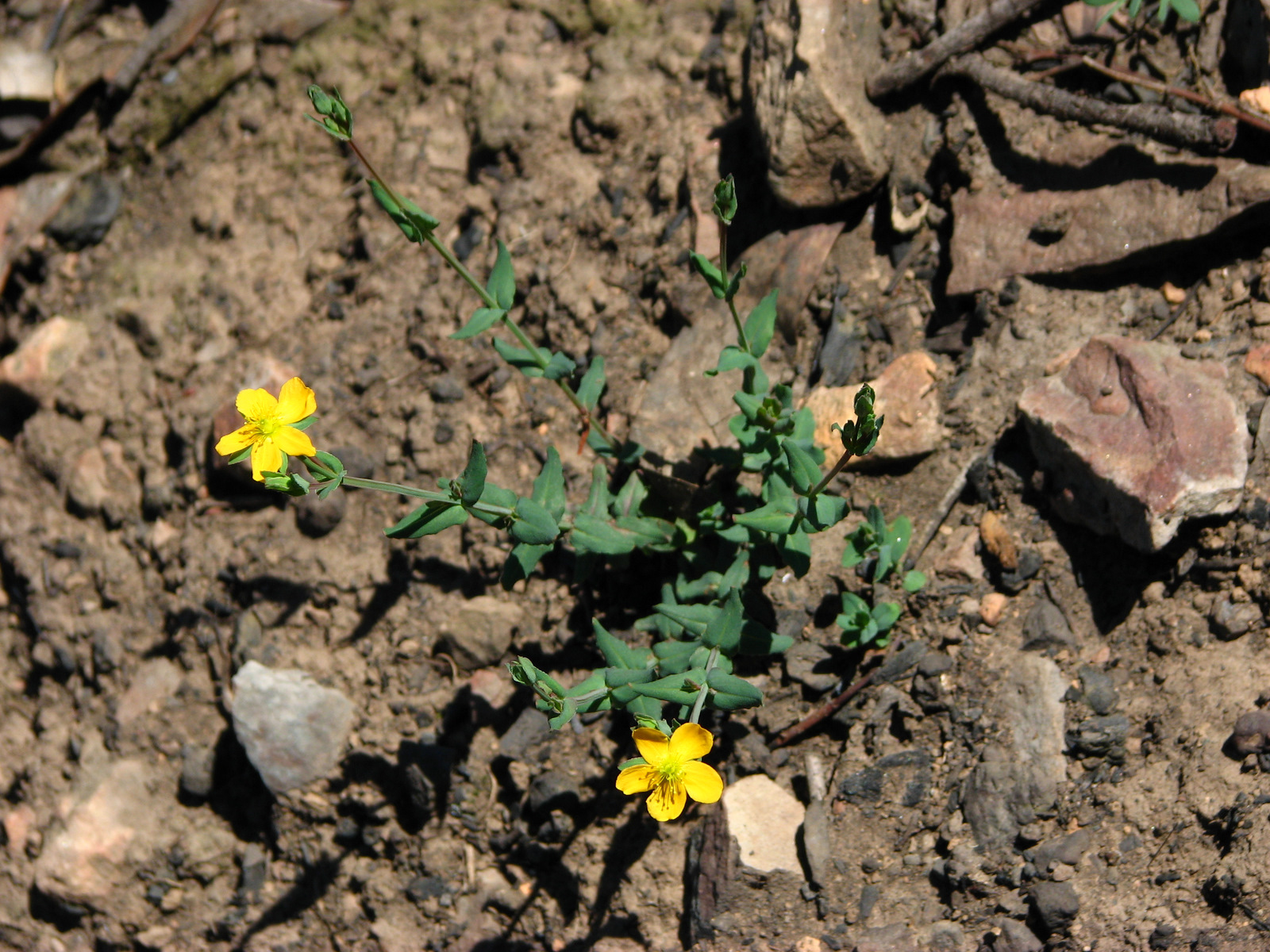

Scientific classification
- Kingdom: Plantae
- Clade: Tracheophytes
- Clade: Angiosperms
- Clade: Eudicots
- Clade: Rosids
- Order: Malpighiales
- Family: Hypericaceae
- Genus: Hypericum
- Section: H. sect. Trigynobrathys
- Subsection: H. subsect. Connatum
- Species: H. gramineum

Binomial name
- Hypericum gramineum G.Forst.

Synonyms
- List: Ascyrum involutum Labill.; Ascyrum involutum Labill.; Brathys billardierei Spach; Brathys forsteri Spach; Hypericum foetidum Hook.f. & Thomson ex Dyer; Hypericum gramineum var. ericifolium Domin; Hypericum gramineum var. genuinum Domin; Hypericum gramineum var. pedicellare (Endl.) Domin; Hypericum involutum (Labill.) Choisy; Hypericum japonicum var. gramineum (G.Forst.) Maiden & Betche; Hypericum pauciflorum subsp. involutum (Labill.) C.Rodr.Jim.; Hypericum pedicellare Endl.; Sarothra graminea (G.Forst.) Y.Kimura; Sarothra saginoides Y.Kimura

= Hypericum gramineum =

Species of flowering plant in the St John's wort family

Hypericum gramineum, commonly known as small St. John's wort or grassy St. Johnswort, is species of flowering plant in the St. Johns wort family Hypericaceae. It is found in parts of Southeast Asia, Oceania, and the Pacific.

== Description ==
Grassy St. Johnswort is a small annual or perennial herb with a height of 5–72 cm (2.0–28.3 in). Its flowers are 5–12 mm in diameter. The plant causes photosensitization and enteritis.

== Distribution and habitat ==
Hypericum gramineum occurs in New Zealand, Australia, New Caledonia, Papua-New Guinea, Vietnam, Taiwan, China (Hainan, Yunnan), India (Meghalaya, Manipur), Bhutan, and the United States (Hawaii). It is found in every state and territory of Australia. It grows in open grassy and shrubby habitats.

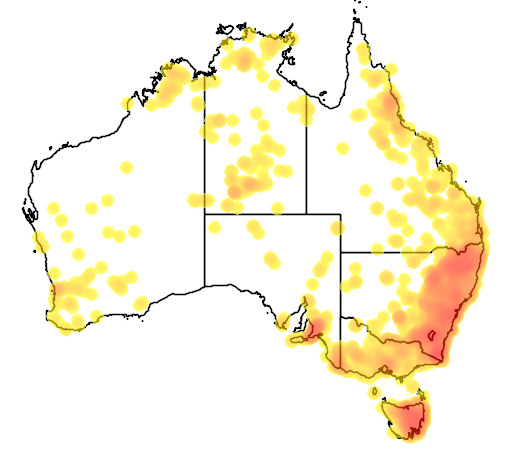
The distribution of Hypericum gramineum in Australia
