= Wallaby grass =

Wallaby grass is a common name for several grasses native to Australia and may refer to:

- Amphibromus
- Austrodanthonia, also native to New Guinea and New Zealand
- Rytidosperma
