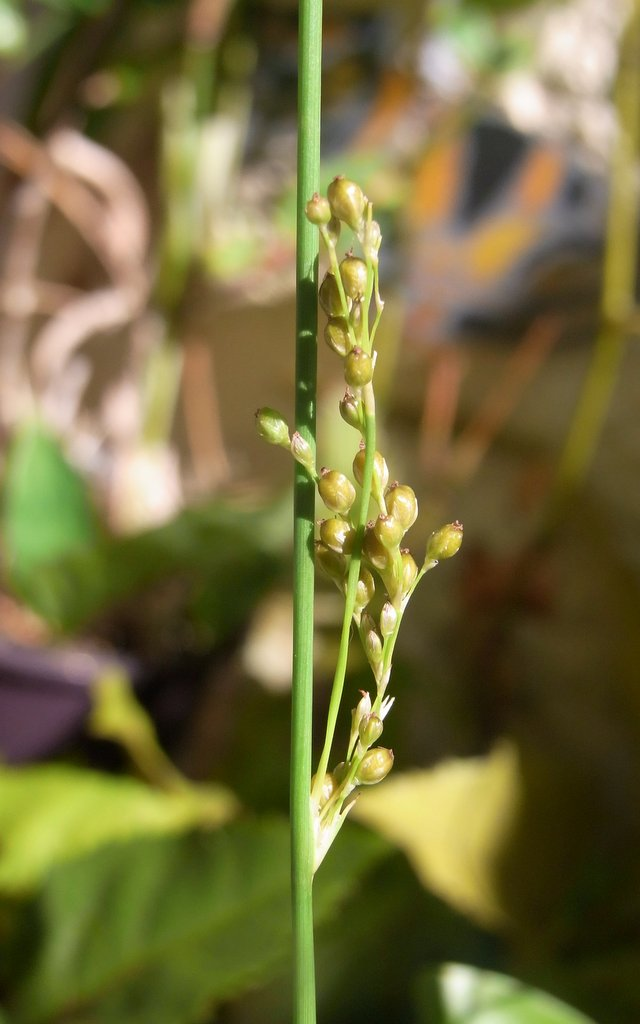
- Chatswood West, Australia

Scientific classification
- Kingdom: Plantae
- Clade: Embryophytes
- Clade: Tracheophytes
- Clade: Spermatophytes
- Clade: Angiosperms
- Clade: Monocots
- Clade: Commelinids
- Order: Poales
- Family: Juncaceae
- Genus: Juncus
- Species: J. subsecundus

Binomial name
- Juncus subsecundus N.A.Wakef.

= Juncus subsecundus =

Species of flowering plant

Juncus subsecundus, the fingered rush, is a species of rush found in many parts of Australia.
