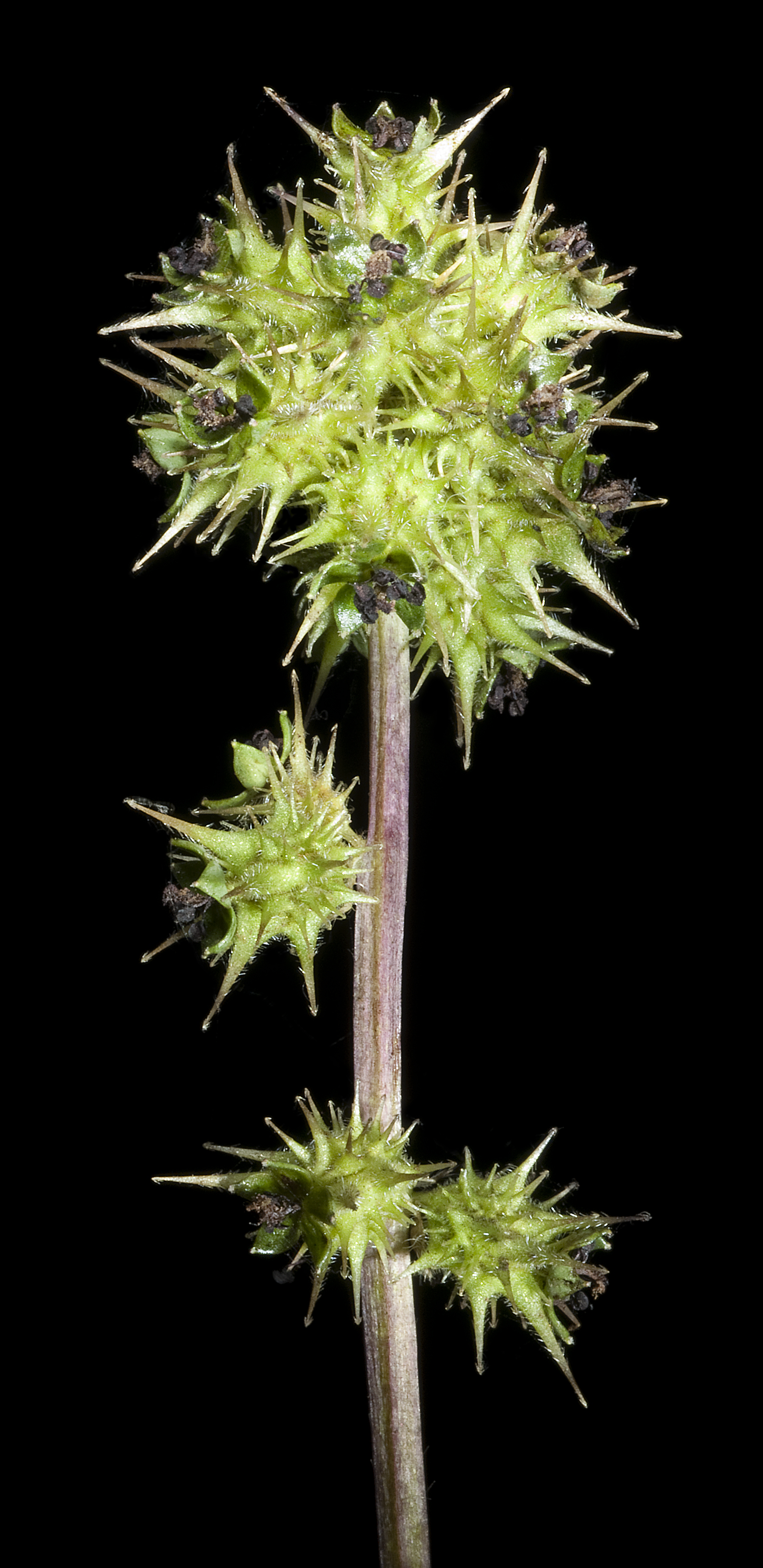

Scientific classification
- Kingdom: Plantae
- Clade: Tracheophytes
- Clade: Angiosperms
- Clade: Eudicots
- Clade: Rosids
- Order: Rosales
- Family: Rosaceae
- Genus: Acaena
- Species: A. echinata

Binomial name
- Acaena echinata Nees, 1844

Varieties
- A. e. var. echinata; A. e. var. retrosumpilosa; A. e. var. subglabricalyx; A. e. var. tylacantha

= Acaena echinata =

Species of flowering plant

Acaena echinata, commonly known as sheep's burr, is a species of perennial herb, in the Rosaceae family, native to Australia.

== Description ==
It grows to a height of 25–40 cm (9.84–15.75 in) and has shiny, green fern-like leaves 6–15 cm (2.36–5.91 in) long which are hairy on the underside. Its tiny pale green flowers form a spike and have purple stamens. The burrs it produces are sharply barbed.

== Taxonomy ==
The Latin specific epithet of echinata refers to hedgehog, from echinus meaning 'prickly'.
