= Richard Thomas Baker =

Australian economic botanist, museum curator and educator

- Born: 1 December 1854
- Died: 14 July 1941
- Occupations: Curator, university teacher, botanical collector
- Awards: Clarke Medal (1922); Mueller Medal (1921)

Signature
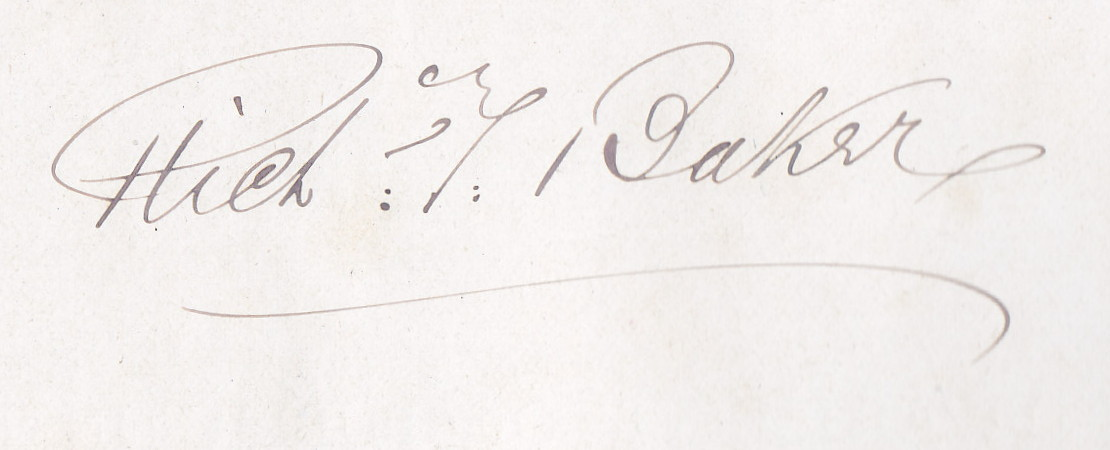

Richard Thomas Baker (1 December 1854 – 14 July 1941) was an Australian economic botanist, museum curator and educator.

== Early life ==
Baker was born in Woolwich, England, son of Richard Thomas Baker, a blacksmith, and his wife Sarah, née Colkett. The boy was educated at Woolwich National School and Peterborough Training Institution, later gaining science and art certificates from South Kensington Museum.

He was engaged as a senior assistant-master by the School Board for London in 1875 but resigned in July 1879 to emigrate to Australia.

== Career in Australia ==
On 15 January 1888 Baker was appointed assistant curator to Joseph Henry Maiden at the Technological Museum.

Baker published a small book, Building and Ornamental Stones of New South Wales (1908), and, again in collaboration with Henry Smith, another valuable piece of research, A Research on the Pines of Australia (1910).

== Later life and legacy ==
Baker was awarded the Mueller Medal by the Australian and New Zealand Association for the Advancement of Science in 1921, and the Clarke Medal of the Royal Society of New South Wales in 1922. He collected both old and modern china and in 1938 joined the Royal Australian Historical Society. Baker died at Cheltenham, New South Wales on 14 July 1941 and was buried in Rookwood Cemetery.

== Selected publications ==
- Richard Thomas Baker (1915), The Australian flora in applied art. Part I, The waratah, Sydney: Powerhouse Museum, Wikidata Q108332528
- Richard T. Baker (1919), The Hardwoods of Australia and their Economics, Government of New South Wales, Wikidata Q108332690
- Richard T. Baker (1915), Building and Ornamental Stones of Australia, Government of New South Wales, Wikidata Q108332778
- Baker, Richard Thomas (1913), Cabinet timbers of Australia, Sydney: W.A. Gullick, Govt. Printer, doi:10.5962/bhl.title.17315, OL 7206292M, Wikidata Q51424204
- Richard T. Baker; Henry G. Smith (1924), Woodfibres of some Australian timbers : investigated in reference to their prospective value for paper-pulp production, Government of New South Wales, Wikidata Q108333008
- Richard T. Baker; Henry G. Smith (1910), A research on the pines of Australia, Wikidata Q108333132

== See also ==
Taxa named by Richard Thomas Baker

Awards
Preceded by Joseph James Fletcher	Clarke Medal; 1922	Succeeded by Walter Baldwin Spencer
