= Urrbrae Wetland =

Urban wetland in South Australia

Coordinates: 34°57′56″S 138°37′11″E

Urrbrae Wetland

The Urrbrae Wetland is a constructed urban wetland in the Australian state of South Australia located in the suburb of Urrbrae in the Adelaide metropolitan area. It was constructed to manage flood water from the nearby Adelaide Hills and has been developed to provide ecological and educational benefits. The wetland covers approximately 6 hectares of land which is onsite of Urrbrae Agricultural High School. The area of water is approximately 4 hectares and when full, contains approximately 13.5 million litres of water.

== Description ==
Wetland and Adelaide Hills

The wetland consists of four ponds: the main pond, two sedimentation ponds and the farm dam. The main pond is clay lined and is designed to be kept filled to prevent drying out and cracking. The farm dam is synthetic lined and is used to top up the main dam when water levels are low. In an average year about 400 million litres of storm water passes through the wetland each year. When the wetland is full it contains about 13.5 million litres of water from a catchment of approximately 380 hectares. Although it is not a true wetland, it serves a useful function in the cleansing of the stormwater via natural cleaning process including:

- The water flow is slowed down
- Sand and other sediments fall to the bottom
- Heavy metals, salts, bacteria etc "stick" onto the falling sand particles
- Reeds, sedges and other plants along the shores filter out much of the salts and heavy metals.

Leaf litter, plastic bags and other debris is removed by rubbish removal systems at the entry to the sedimentation ponds to aid in cleansing of the water. The cleansed water then travels via storm water pipes to Brown Hill Creek and to the sea. This process is arranged and funded by the City of Mitcham. In 2011 construction began on pipes and facilities for some of the water to be pumped to tanks at the High School and used for watering grounds during summer months.

== History ==
In July 1993 the City of Mitcham and the Urrbrae Agricultural High School were independently investigating a wetland project. Mitcham Council was seeking to alleviate a long-standing flooding problem, while the school wanted to address regular flooding on its farmland and to broaden its environmental studies curriculum. Work on the project to construct the Urrbrae detention basin that would store the excess water commenced in June 1996 and finished in December 1996. It cost $1.2m, contributed by the City of Mitcham, the SA Department of Transport and the [Patawalonga River | Patawalonga] Catchment Water Management Board. The Education Department provided the land that was originally bequeathed to the State of South Australia for educational use by Peter Waite, a prominent pastoralist of the early 20th century. In August 1997 the organisation, The Friends of the Urrbrae Wetland, was established, sponsored initially by the Rotary Club, Mitcham. The chief activity of the Friends is to establish, as far as possible, the native vegetation which existed prior to European settlement, and which is generally known as grey box woodland, Eucalyptus microcarpa. The Friends meet weekly for environmental improvement tasks including planting and weeding.

== Ecosystem ==
=== Plants ===
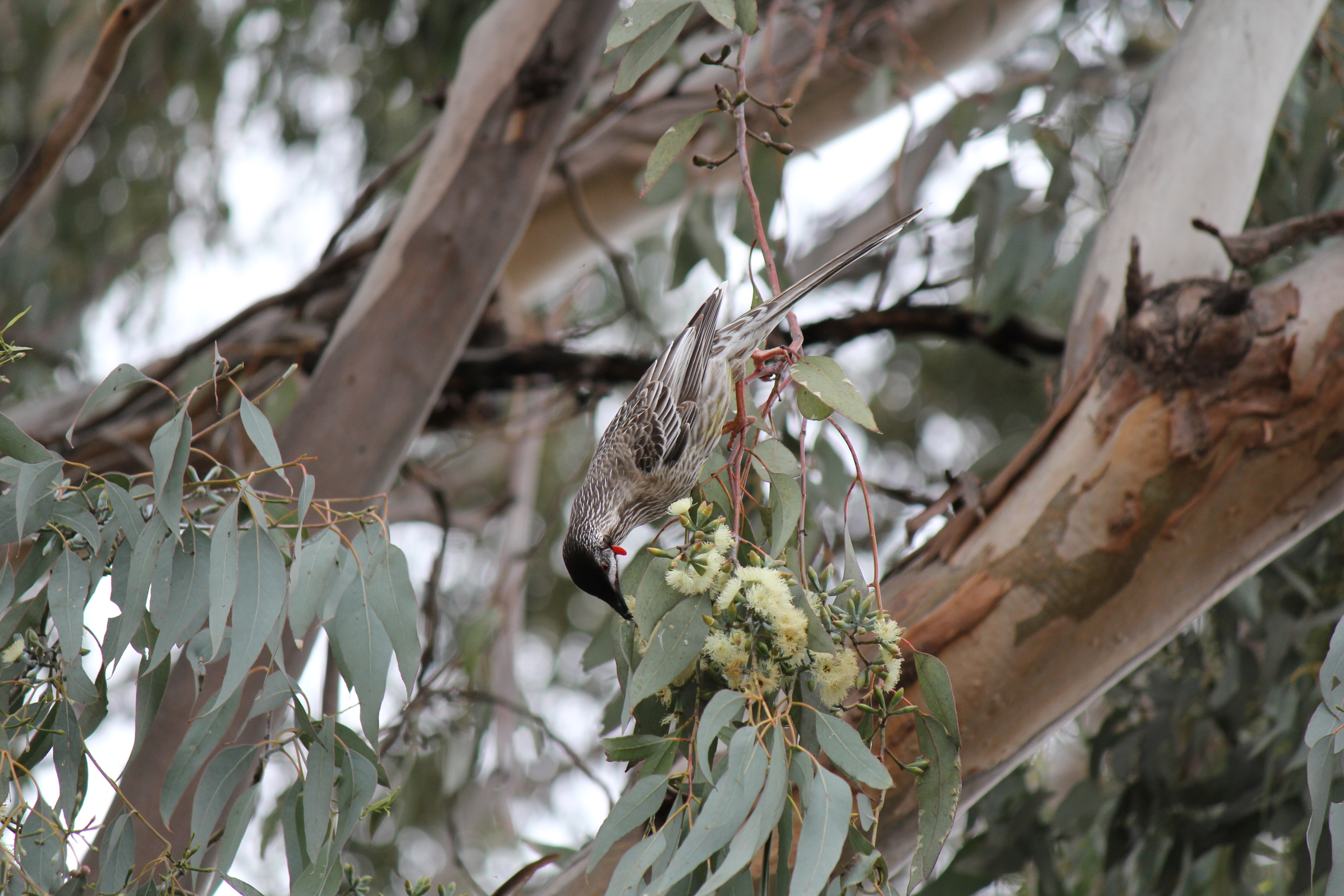
Red wattlebird feeding off grey box flowers

The native vegetation which existed prior to European settlement, and now found in the wetland, is generally known as grey box woodland. This ecological community is now classified as 'threatened' by the Australian Government Department of Sustainability, Environment, Water, Population and Communities.

==== Grey box woodland ====
The grey box woodland consists mainly of Eucalyptus microcarpa, commonly known as the "grey box" due to its bark colour, which was a dominant species on the southern Adelaide Plains. Over the years the Friends have planted over one hundred indigenous terrestrial and aquatic plant species to maximise diversity, habitat and serve as a resource for other revegetation projects.

For example,

- Canopy plants: grey box (Eucalyptus microcarpa), river red gum (Eucalyptus camaldulensis), South Australian blue gum (Eucalyptus leucoxylon)) and drooping sheoak (Allocasuarina verticillata), Callitris gracilis and native apricot
- Shrubs including five different varieties of acacias or wattles, Bursaria spinosa, sticky hop bush, Dodonaea viscosa
- Under-story plants including several varieties of saltbrush, eutaxia, vittadinia daisies, lilies and many varieties of native grasses.

==== Plants that grow well in the Wetland ====
The plants listed below grow well at the Urrbrae Wetland as identified in March 2013.

| Botanic name | Common names |
| Acacia acinacea | Gold-dust wattle, round leaf wattle |
| Acacia dodonaeifolia | Sticky wattle |
| Acacia paradoxa | Kangaroo thorn |
| Acacia pycnantha | Golden wattle |
| Acacia retinoides (swamp form) | Swamp wattle |
| Allocasuarina verticillata | Drooping sheoak |
| Arthropodium strictum | Vanilla or chocolate lily |
| Atriplex semibaccata | Creeping saltbush, berry saltbush |
| Austrodanthonia spp. | Wallaby grass |
| Austrostipa spp. | Spear grasses including those listed below |
| Austrostipa curticoma | Short-crest spear grass |
| Austrostipa elegantissima | Feather spear grass elegant |
| Austrostipa nodosa |
| Billardiera cymosa | Sweet apple-berry |
| Bulbine bulbosa | Bulbine-lily, native leek |
| Bursaria spinosa | Sweet bursaria, Christmas bush |
| Callitris gracilis (formerly preissii) | Southern cypress pine |
| Calostemma purpureum | Yellow or pink garland lily |
| Carex spp. | Tussock sedge, tall sedge |
| Chloris truncata | Windmill grass, star grass |
| Chrysocephalum apiculatum | Common everlasting |
| Chrysocephalum semipapposum | Clustered everlasting |
| Chrysocephalum semipapposum | Clustered everlasting |
| Cladium procerum | Leafy twig-rush |
| Clematis microphylla | Old man's beard |
| Convolvulus remotus | Australian bindweed |
| Cullen australasicum | Native scurf pea |
| Cyperus gymnocaulos | Spiny sedge, spiny flat sedge |
| Cyperus vaginatus | Flat sedge |
| Dianella revoluta | Black-anther flax lily |
| Dianella brevicaulis | Black-anther lily |
| Dichanthium sericeum | Queensland blue grass, silky blue grass |
| Dodonaea viscosa sp. spatulata | Giant hop bush, sticky hop bush |
| Einadia nutans | Climbing saltbush |
| Enchylaena tomentosa | Ruby saltbush, berry cottonbush |
| Epilobium hirtigerum | Willowherb |
| Eucalyptus camaldulensis | Flooded gum, river red gum, yarrah |
| Eucalyptus leucoxylon | Yellow gum, S.A. blue gum |
| Eucalyptus microcarpa | Grey box |
| Eutaxia microphylla | allee bush-pea or large leaf eutaxia |
| Eutaxia diffusa | Spreading mallee pea |
| Ficinia nodosa | Knobby club-rush |
| Geranium retrorsum | Common cranes bill, native geranium |
| Goodenia albiflora | White goodenia |
| Goodenia amplexans | Clasping goodenia |
| Hardenbergia violacea | False sarsaparilla, native lilac, coral pea |
| Juncus kraussii | Sea rush |
| Juncus pallidus | Pale rush |
| Juncus subsecundus | Finger rush |
| Kennedia prostrata | Scarlet runner, running postman |
| Leptospermum lanigerum | Silky tea-tree |
| Lomandra densiflora | Pointed mat-rush |
| Lomandra multiflora sp. dura | Many-flowered mat-rush |
| Lycopus australis | Australian gypsywort |
| Lythrum hyssopifolia | Hyssop loosestrife, lesser loosestrife |
| Malva behriana | Native hollyhock, Australian hollyhock |
| Myoporum viscosum | Sticky boobialla |
| Olearia ramulosa | Twiggy daisy bush, oily bush |
| Persicaria decipiens | Slender knotweed |
| Persicaria lapathifolia | Pale knotweed |
| Phragmites australis | Common reed, cane-grass |
| Pittosporum angustifolium | Native apricot, butterbush |
| Pseudognaphalium luteo-album | Cudweed, Jersey cudweed |
| Ranunculus lappaceus | Common buttercup, native buttercup |
| Rubus parvifolius | Small-leaf raspberry, native raspberry |
| Senecio hypoleucus | Pale groundsel |
| Senecio quadridentatus | Cotton groundsel |
| Themeda triandra | Kangaroo grass |
| Vittadinia blackii | Western New Holland daisy |
| Vittadinia cuneata | Fuzzy New Holland daisy |
| Vittadinia gracilis | Woolly New Holland daisy |
| Wahlenbergia stricta | Austral bluebell, tall bluebell |

==== Aquatic animals ====
Water based animals include four frog species and over fifty macro invertebrate species, Murray River rainbowfish and common yabby.

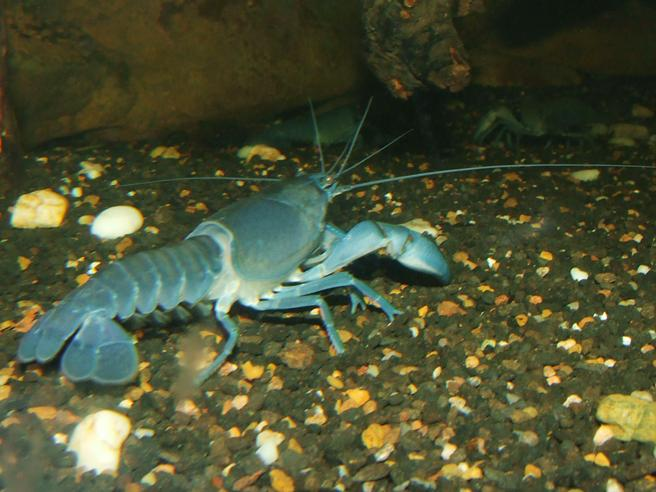
Common yabby

==== Birds ====
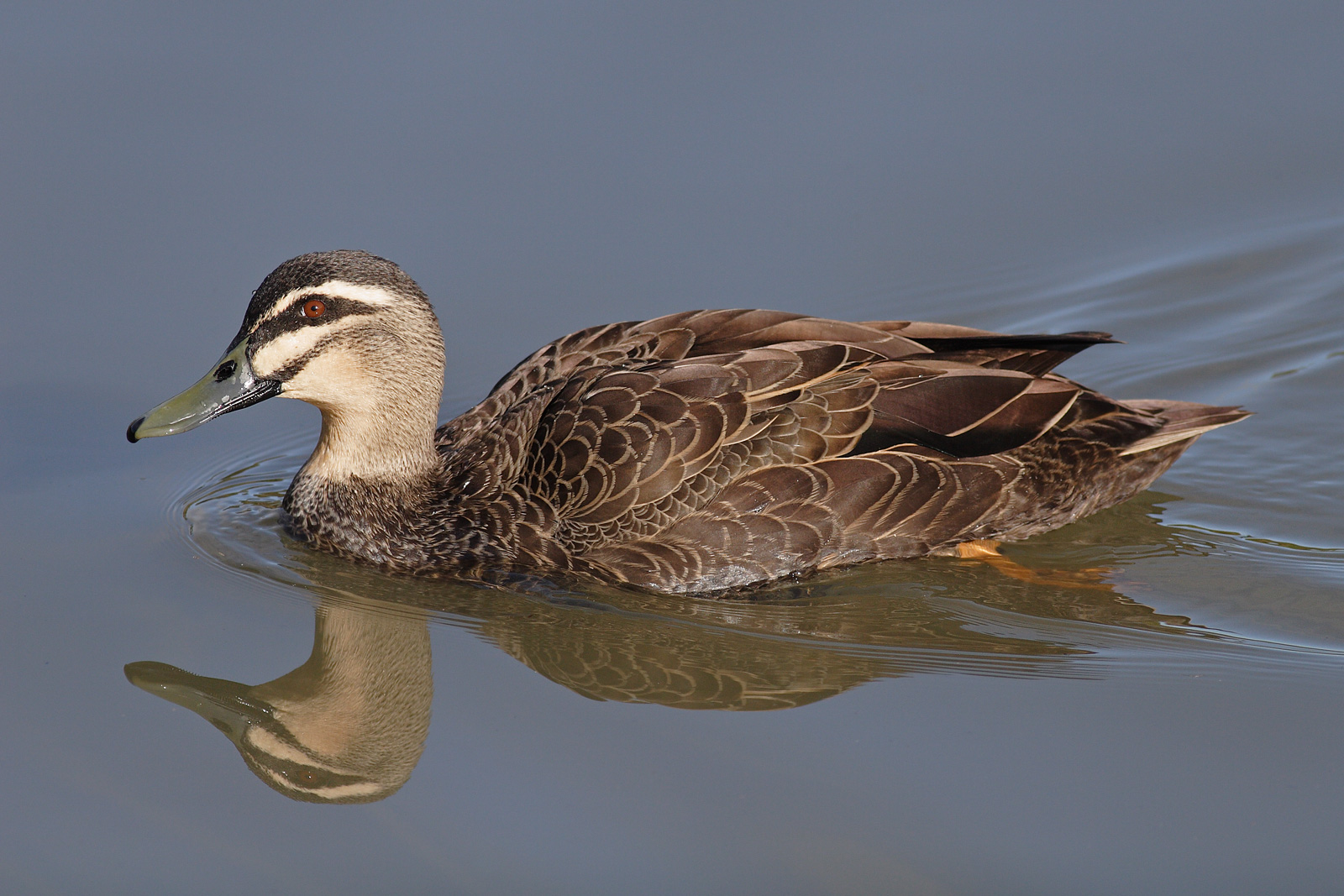
Pacific black duck

The permanent water in the wetland, its adjacent habitats and a reliable feed source, have attracted many species of waterbirds to this site. Commonly seen birds are Pacific black duck hybrids, Australian wood duck, Australasian grebe, Eurasian coot. Some rarely seen birds are sacred kingfisher, and the little lorikeet.

With the presence of maturing nectar bearing and insect attracting flora, an increasing number of bush birds can also be seen in the different seasons. For example, when the eucalyptus are flowering the New Holland honeyeater, musk lorikeet and rainbow lorikeet are frequent visitors. Breeding of some species is occurring in the Wetland, including the, dusky moorhen, Eurasian coot, Australasian grebe, clamorous reed warbler, magpie-lark, willie wagtail, crested pigeon and spotted turtle dove.

== Education ==
=== School and tertiary education ===
The wetland has a classroom with laboratory facilities and visual aids providing a major learning centre for the Urrbrae Agricultural High School and TAFE (Technical and Further Education) students on the nearby school campus. The school funds the position of a Science Teacher-Manager permanently on site. It is also used by other schools and community groups who come to the centre to learn about the role of wetland. Each year about 10,000 students visit the wetland.

=== Community education ===
The Friends of the Urrbrae Wetland is a volunteer group that meets weekly to help maintain the Wetland and offers two public Open Days a year which include a talk and guided walk. A focus of these talks and walks is the reestablishment of the Grey Box Woodland.
