= E. lutea =

E. lutea may refer to:

- Eatoniella lutea, a sea snail
- Eilema lutea, an Afro-Eurasian moth
- Ekhidna lutea, an environmental bacterium
- Eleotris lutea, a sleeper goby
- Eleutherobia lutea, a soft coral
- Empis lutea, a dance fly
- Encarsia lutea, a parasitic wasp
- Endamoeba lutea, an amoeboid without mitochondria
- Epigelasma lutea, an emerald moth
- Epithele lutea, a bracket fungus
- Erecella lutea, a daddy longlegs
- Erioptera lutea, a crane fly
- Euhesma lutea, an Australian bee
- Euphylidorea lutea, a crane fly
- Euproctis lutea, an Oceanian moth
- Eutaxia lutea, a plant native to Australia
