= Eutaxia obovata =

Eutaxia obovata may refer to:

- Eutaxia obovata Turcz., a synonym of Eutaxia parvifolia Benth.
- Eutaxia obovata (Labill.) C.A.Gardner [nom. illeg.], a synonym of Eutaxia myrtifolia (Sm.) R.Br.
