= Eutaxia lasiophylla =

Scientific classification
- Kingdom: Plantae
- Clade: Tracheophytes
- Clade: Angiosperms
- Clade: Eudicots
- Clade: Rosids
- Order: Fabales
- Family: Fabaceae
- Subfamily: Faboideae
- Genus: Eutaxia
- Species: E. lasiophylla

Binomial name
- Eutaxia lasiophylla G.R.Hend

Species of legume

Eutaxia lasiophylla is a species of flowering plant in the family Fabaceae and is endemic to the south-west of Western Australia.

The shrub has an erect or spreading habit with yellow, red and purple coloured pea-like flowers. It is found between Yellowdine in the east to Narembeen in the west to north of Hyden in the south to around Mount Manning Range Conservation Park in the north in the Wheatbelt and Goldfields–Esperance regions of Western Australia.
