= Eutaxia exilis =

Scientific classification
- Kingdom: Plantae
- Clade: Tracheophytes
- Clade: Angiosperms
- Clade: Eudicots
- Clade: Rosids
- Order: Fabales
- Family: Fabaceae
- Subfamily: Faboideae
- Genus: Eutaxia
- Species: E. exilis

Binomial name
- Eutaxia exilis C.F.Wilkins & G.R.Hend

Species of legume

Eutaxia exilis is a species of flowering plant in the family Fabaceae and is endemic to the south-west of Western Australia.

It is a climbing or spindly shrub with yellow coloured pea-like flowers. It is found between Margaret River, Harvey and Augusta in the south west region of Western Australia.
