= Eutaxia neurocalyx =

Scientific classification
- Kingdom: Plantae
- Clade: Tracheophytes
- Clade: Angiosperms
- Clade: Eudicots
- Clade: Rosids
- Order: Fabales
- Family: Fabaceae
- Subfamily: Faboideae
- Genus: Eutaxia
- Species: E. neurocalyx

Binomial name
- Eutaxia neurocalyx (Turcz.) G.R.Hend

Species of legume

Eutaxia neurocalyx is a species of flowering plant in the family Fabaceae and is endemic to the south-west of Western Australia.

The shrub has an upright or spreading habit with yellow, red, brown and purple coloured pea-like flowers. It is found between Tammin in the north to Albany in the south.
