= Eutaxia acanthoclada =

Conservation status
- Priority Three — Poorly Known Taxa (DEC)

Scientific classification
- Kingdom: Plantae
- Clade: Tracheophytes
- Clade: Angiosperms
- Clade: Eudicots
- Clade: Rosids
- Order: Fabales
- Family: Fabaceae
- Subfamily: Faboideae
- Genus: Eutaxia
- Species: E. acanthoclada

Binomial name
- Eutaxia acanthoclada G.R.Hend & Chappill

Species of legume

Eutaxia acanthoclada is a species of flowering plant in the family Fabaceae and is endemic to southern parts of Western Australia.

The shrub has a compact and mat forming habit and has yellow, orange and red coloured pea-like flowers that form between October and November. It has a scattered distribution to the north west of Lake King.
