= Southeast Australia temperate savanna =

Ecoregion in Australia

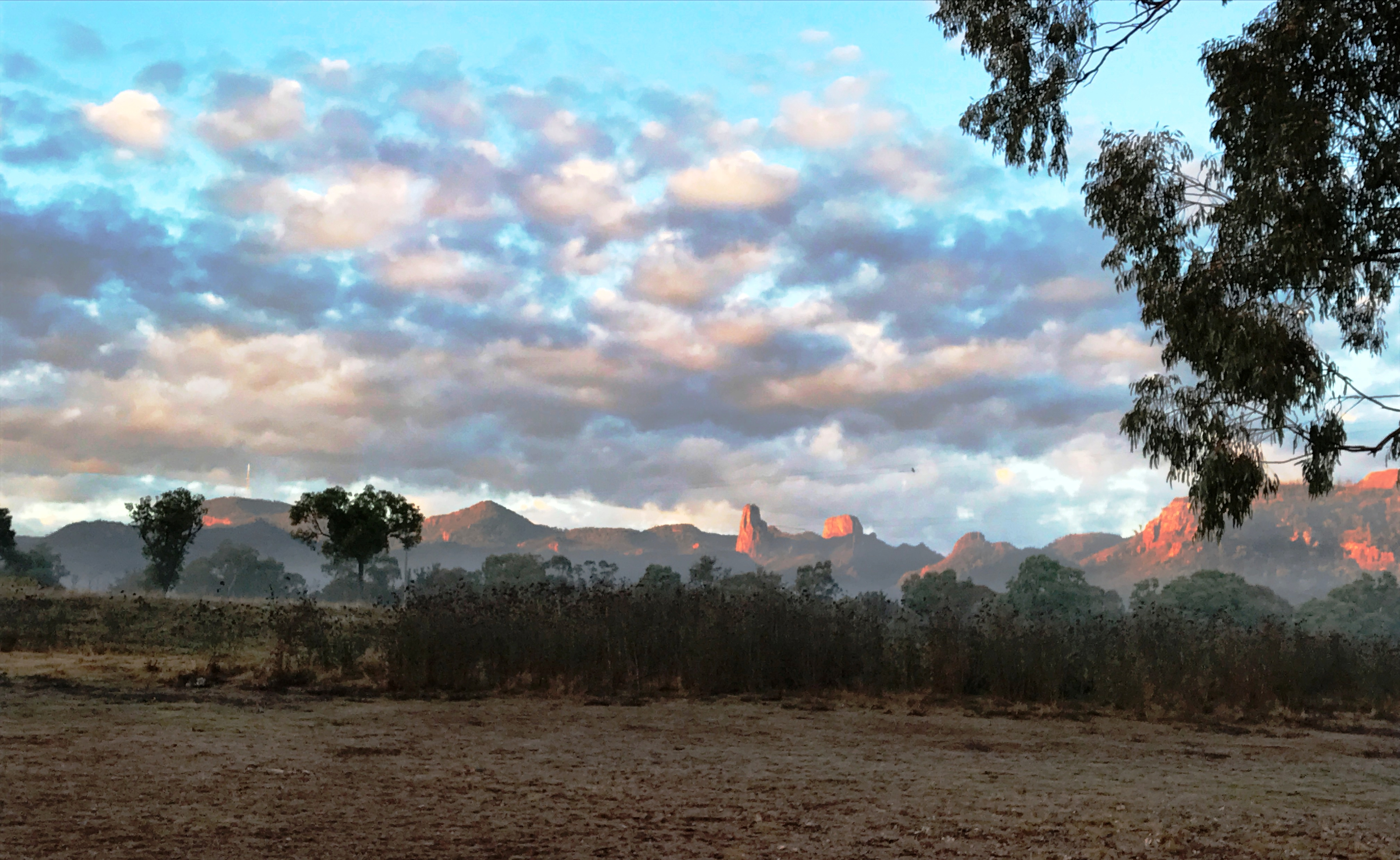
- Warrumbungle National Park

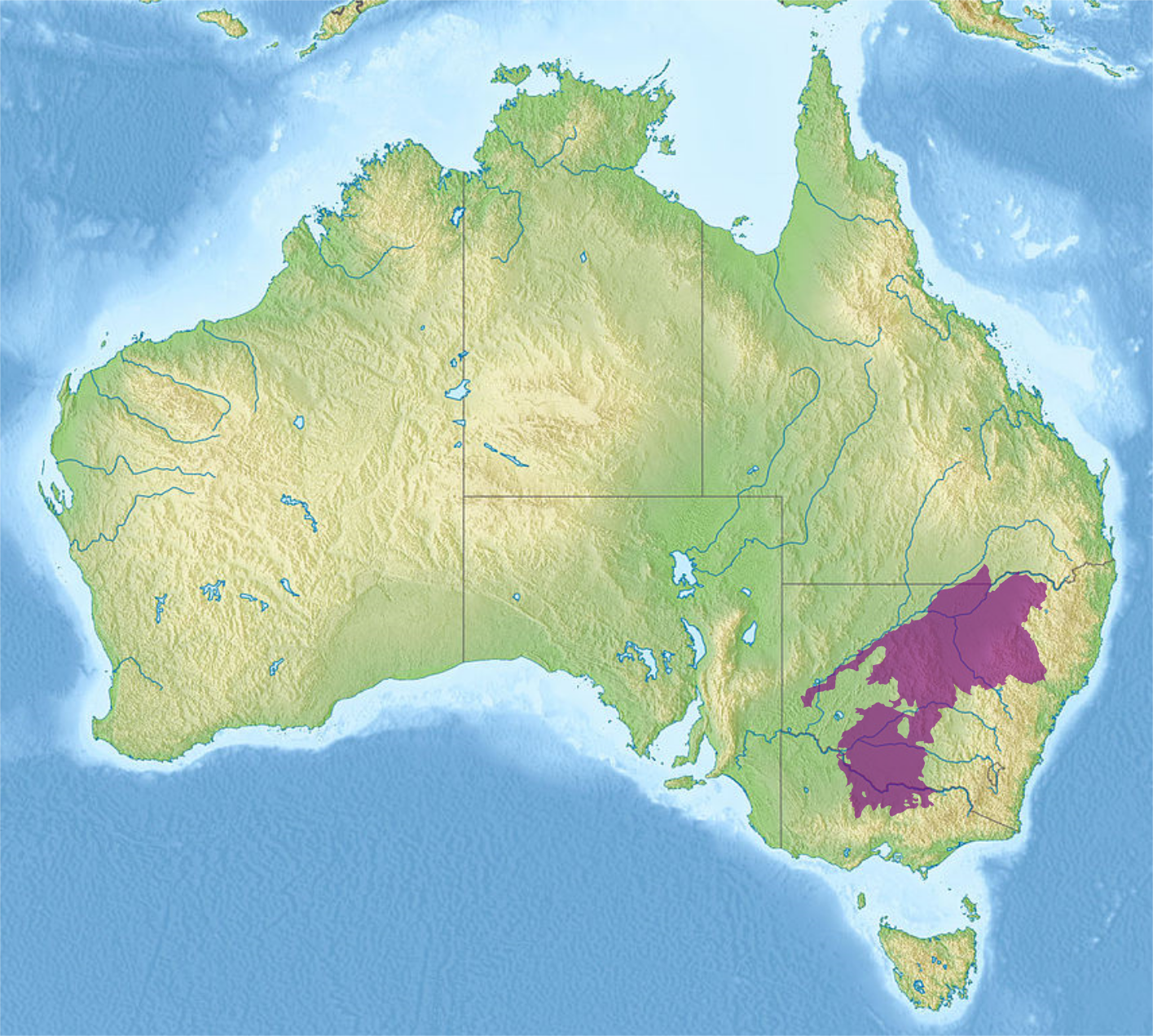
- Ecoregion territory (in purple)

Ecology
- Realm: Australasian
- Biome: Temperate grasslands, savannas, and shrublands
- Borders: List: Brigalow tropical savanna; New England Peppermint Grassy Woodland; Tirari-Sturt stony desert; Murray-Darling woodlands and mallee; Southeast Australia temperate forests; Northern Plains Grassland; Warkworth Sands Woodland of the Hunter Valley; Coastal Valley Grassy Woodlands

Geography
- Area: 322,200 km^{2} (124,400 mi^{2})
- Country: Australia
- States: New South Wales; Victoria
- Coordinates: 31.6°S 147.25°E

Conservation
- Conservation status: Critical/endangered

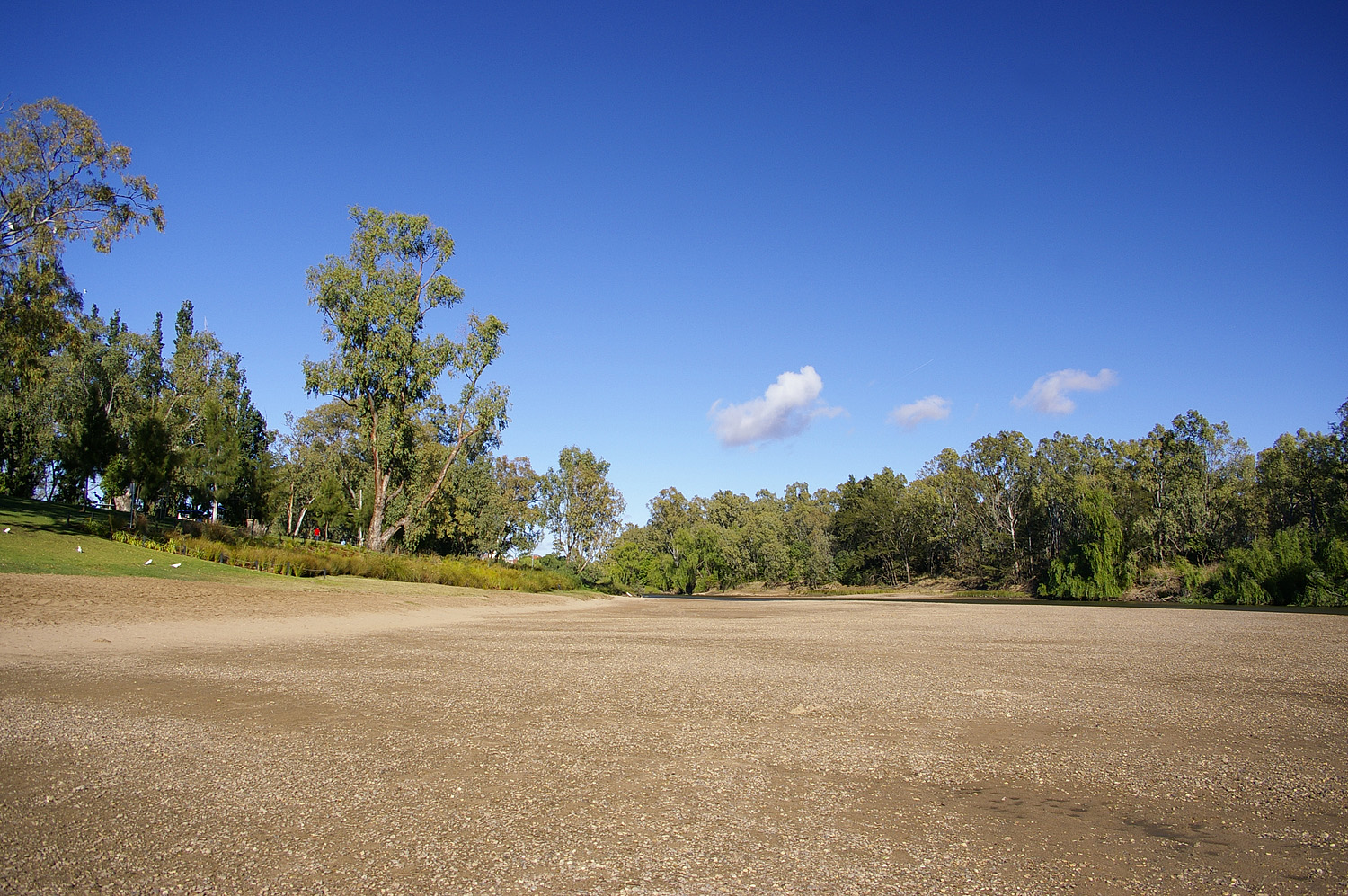
An example of temperate grassland in Wagga Wagga with scattered trees and shrubs.

The Southeast Australia temperate savanna ecoregion is a large area of grassland dotted with eucalyptus trees running north–south across central New South Wales, Australia.

In Australia, the region is known as, or corresponds to, the Grey Box Grassy Woodlands and Derived Native Grasslands of South-Eastern Australia, which are described as "temperate eucalypt woodlands with a grassy understorey".

== Location and description ==
It is a dry area of low hills and valleys of which the southern section is the wheat-growing plain known as the Riverina and the northern section is low hills and plains mostly used for grazing sheep running north to the plains of the Darling River basin and the New South Wales–Queensland border. Rivers of the savanna include the Murray River and the Murrumbidgee in the south and the Darling River in the north. Rainfall is low and irregular, from 300 to 500 mm per year becoming less further westward, and that is where the vegetation grades to Shrub–steppe.

Most of the region features a semi-arid climate, though small areas in the east of the zone have a humid subtropical climate. The ecoregion as defined by WWF includes the Darling Riverine Plains, Cobar Peneplain, and Riverina IBRA regions, along with the southern portion of the Brigalow Belt South in New South Wales.

== Flora ==
The dry climate sustains hardy shrubs and grasses scattered with small patches of the bimble box, grey box and coolibah eucalyptus trees that once covered most of this part of Australia. The Riverina area nearer the coast contains red river gum (Eucalyptus camaldulensis) and black box (Eucalyptus largiflorens). Many parts also see assemblages of Acacia, Callitris and Casuarina.

The effect of massive numbers of sheep on the grassland was dramatic and was noted by settlers in the grassland regions. The original soil of the grasslands was soft and absorbed rain readily, but heavy continuous stock grazing drove a degradation sequence that shifted the botanical composition of native grasslands from an ecosystem regulated by large, perennial tussock grasses such as Themeda triandra (kangaroo grass) to one containing abundant disturbance tolerant native grasses such as Rytidosperma spp.

== Fauna ==
These grasslands are the western limit for much of the wildlife that lives here as further west is desert. Wildlife of the savanna includes mammals such as the mouse-like kultarr marsupial (Antechinomys laniger), tiger quoll (Dasyurus maculatus), and brush-tailed rock-wallaby (Petrogale penicillata). The western barred bandicoot (Perameles bougainville fasciata) and bridled nail-tail wallaby that once lived here are now presumed extinct in New South Wales.

Birds include the endangered bush stone-curlew (Burhinus grallarius), superb parrot (Polytelis swainsonii), red goshawk (Erythrotriorchis radiatus), malleefowl (Leipoa ocellata) and plains-wanderer (Pedionomus torquatus), and reptiles include an endangered skink Anomalopus mackayi. The Riverina grasslands are home to birds such as the freckled duck, and wintering populations of swift parrot (Lathamus discolor).

== Threats and preservation ==
Active preservation of habitats is required because much of the savanna has been converted to pasture or wheatland. This is particularly so in the Riverina where most has been cleared for wheat planting, a process that is ongoing, while the grasslands are vulnerable to overgrazing, and rivers including the Murray and Murrumbidgee are depleted by being water sources for large irrigation projects. As land is cleared it becomes habitat for invasive species such as noisy miner bird (Manorina melanophrys) and Australian raven (Corvus coronoides).

== Protected areas ==
A 2017 assessment identified 15,778 km^{2} of protected areas, excluding the Brigalow Belt south portion of the ecoregion. Protected areas in the Brigalow Belt portion of the ecoregion include the parks and reserves in the Pilliga forest and the steep volcanic outcrops of Warrumbungle National Park. Other protected areas include Barmah National Park, Gundabooka National Park, Murrumbidgee Valley National Park, Oolambeyan National Park, Willandra National Park and Urrbrae Wetland. There are small areas of parkland elsewhere and plans to create more, but there are no large areas of original savanna under protection.
