= Eutaxia hirsuta =

Scientific classification
- Kingdom: Plantae
- Clade: Tracheophytes
- Clade: Angiosperms
- Clade: Eudicots
- Clade: Rosids
- Order: Fabales
- Family: Fabaceae
- Subfamily: Faboideae
- Genus: Eutaxia
- Species: E. hirsuta

Binomial name
- Eutaxia hirsuta C.F.Wilkins & Chappill

Species of legume

Eutaxia hirsuta is a species of flowering plant in the family Fabaceae and is endemic to the south-west of Western Australia.

The shrub has an erect and spindly habit with yellow and red coloured pea-like flowers that appear in October. It is found between Coolgardie, Kondinin, Merredin and Narembeen in the wheatbelt region of Western Australia.
