= Darling Riverine Plains =

- Region
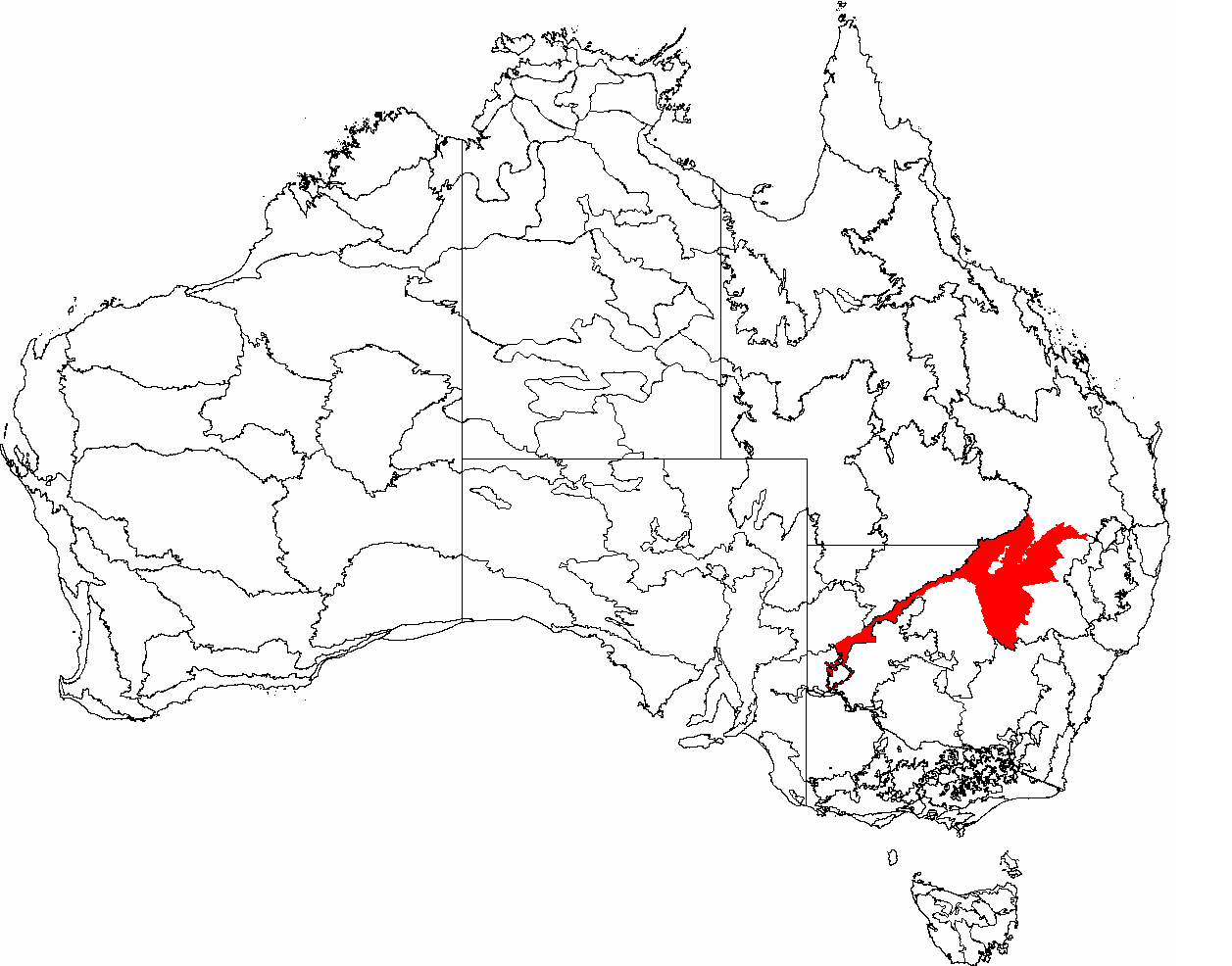
- The interim Australian bioregions, with the Darling Riverine Plains in red
- Country: Australia
- State: Australia

Area
  - Total: 106,997.69 km^{2} (41,312.04 sq mi)
Regions around Darling Riverine Plains
Mulga Lands	Mulga Lands	Brigalow Belt South
Broken Hill Complex	Darling Riverine Plains	Brigalow Belt South
Murray Darling Depression	Cobar Peneplain	NSW South Western Slopes

The Darling Riverine Plains is an interim Australian bioregion located in southern Queensland and northern New South Wales. It has an area of 10,699,769 hectares (26,439,710 acres). South Eastern Queensland bioregion is part of the Southeast Australia temperate savanna ecoregion.

== Subregions ==
The Darling Riverine Plains bioregion consists of nine subregions:

- Culgoa-Bokhara (DRP01) – 1,354,799 hectares (3,347,780 acres)
- Warrambool-Moonie (DRP02) – 1,151,637 hectares (2,845,760 acres)
- Castlereagh-Barwon (DRP03) – 4,500,355 hectares (11,120,620 acres)
- Bogan-Macquarie (DRP04) – 1,999,951 hectares (4,941,990 acres)
- Louth Plains (DRP05) – 276,573 hectares (683,430 acres)
- Wilcannia Plains (DRP06) – 504,562 hectares (1,246,800 acres)
- Menindee (DRP07) – 653,935 hectares (1,615,910 acres)
- Great Darling Anabranch (DRP08) – 147,138 hectares (363,590 acres)
- Pooncarie-Darling (DRP09) – 110,819 hectares (273,840 acres)
