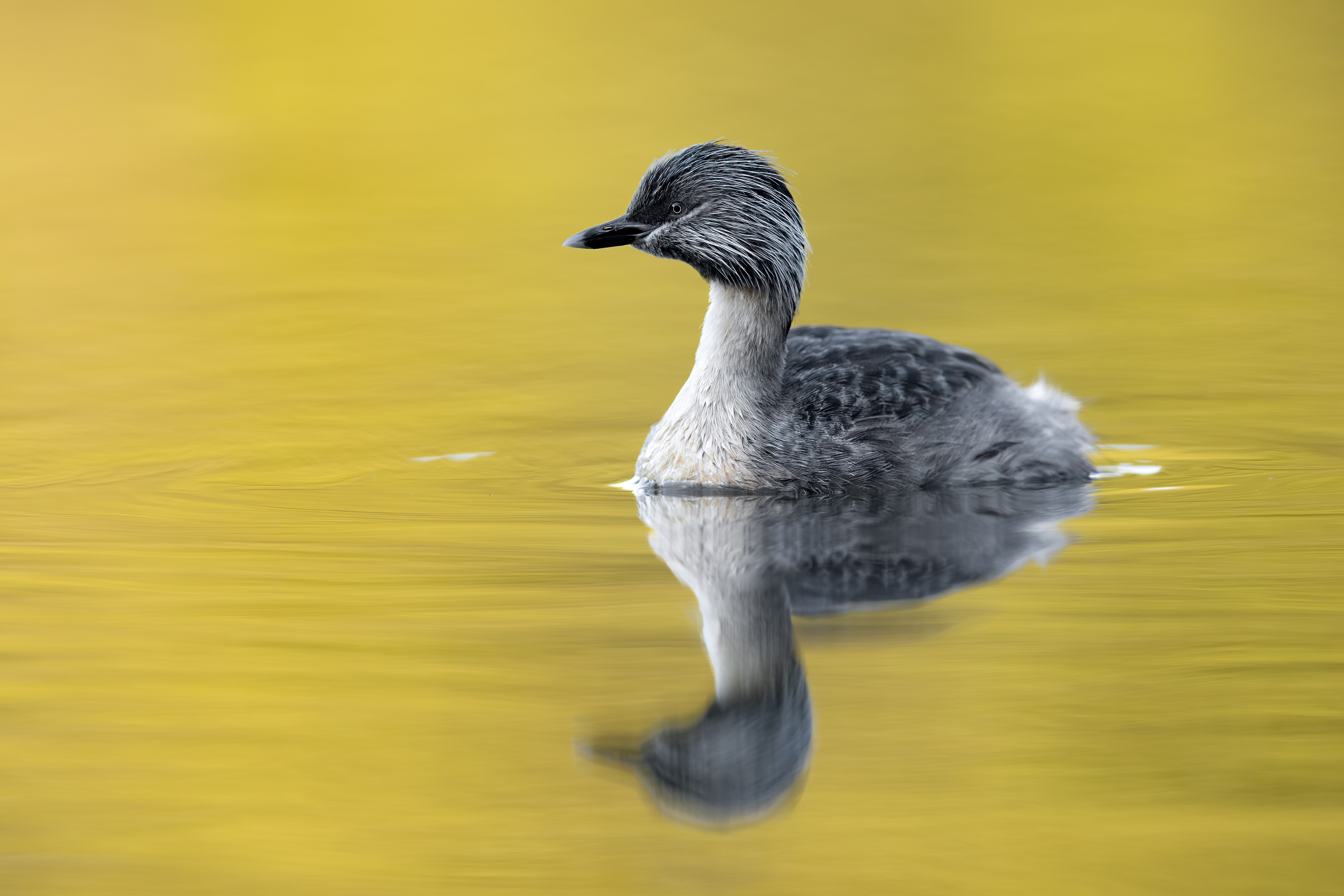
- breeding plumage
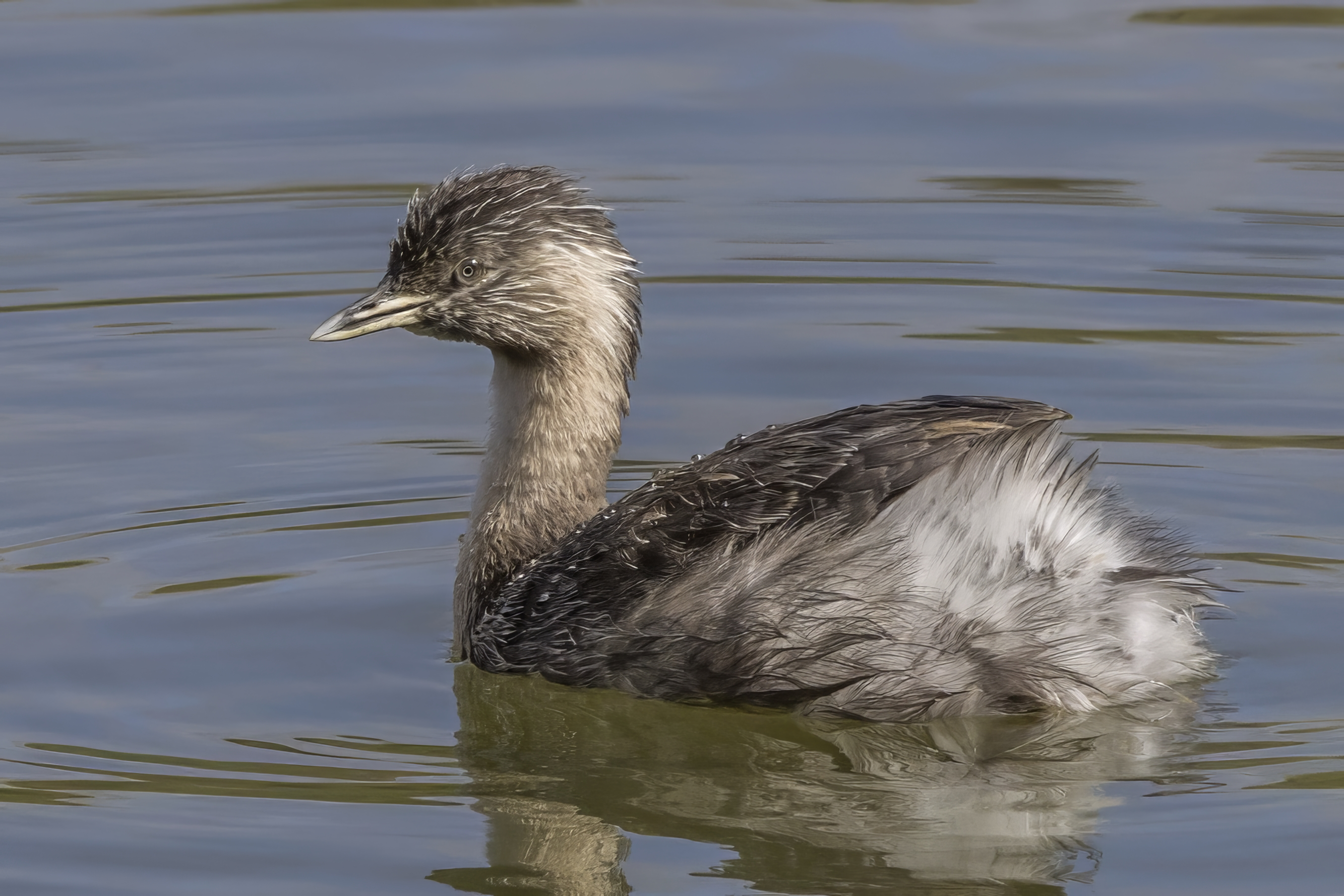
- non-breeding plumage

Conservation status
- Least Concern (IUCN 3.1)

Scientific classification
- Kingdom: Animalia
- Phylum: Chordata
- Class: Aves
- Order: Podicipediformes
- Family: Podicipedidae
- Genus: Poliocephalus
- Species: P. poliocephalus

Binomial name
- Poliocephalus poliocephalus (Jardine & Selby, 1827)
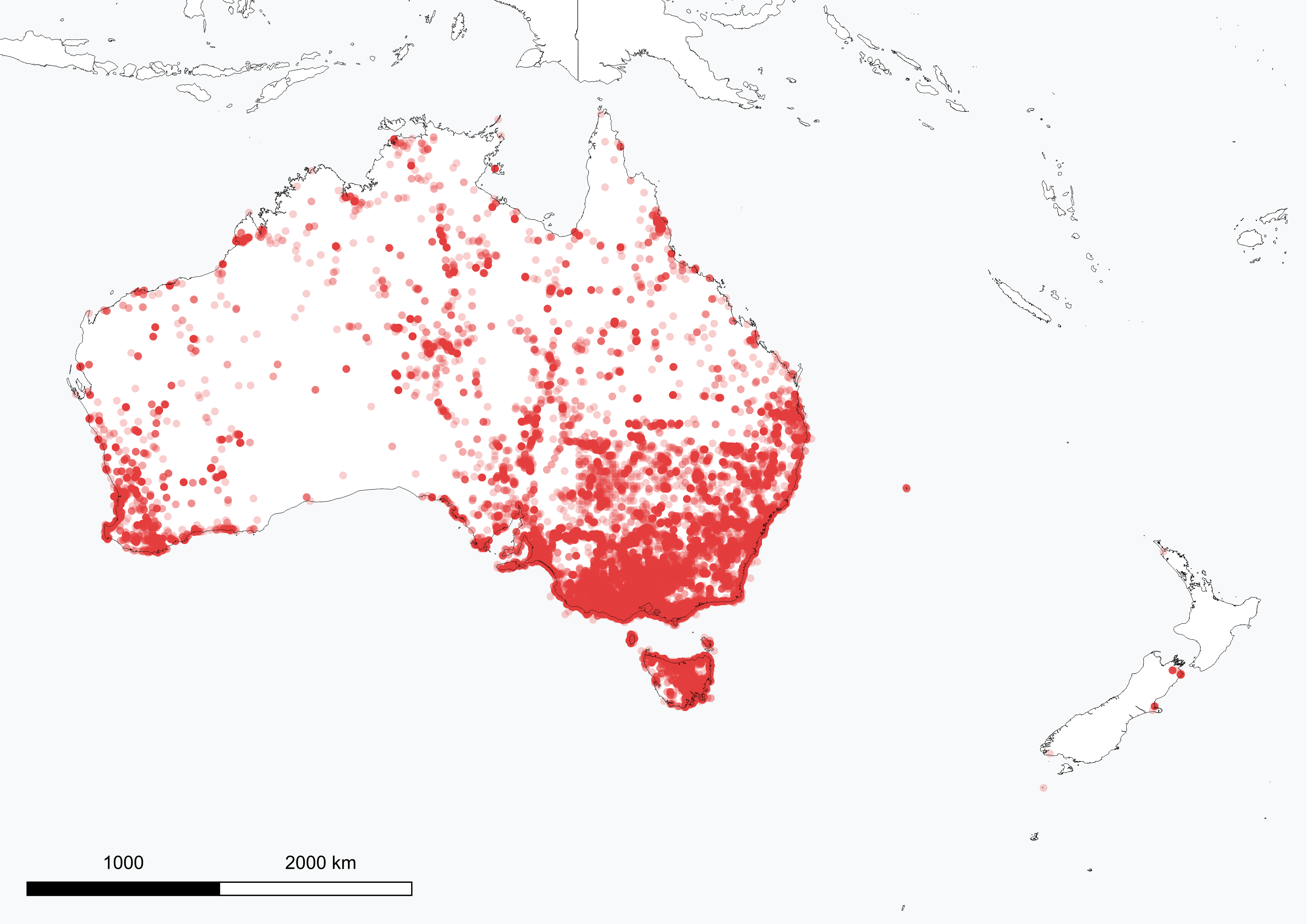
- Species distribution

= Hoary-headed grebe =

Species of bird

The hoary-headed grebe (Poliocephalus poliocephalus) is a member of the grebe family. It breeds in southern parts of Australia; it winters throughout the island of Tasmania. The bird takes its name from the silvery-white streaking on its black head. It is common in Australia, with a population of about 500,000. Its habitat is similar to that of the Australasian grebe.

== Description ==
The hoary-headed grebe is a fairly small dark grey and white grebe. It has a brown eye and a black patch under the chin, and a narrow black streak down the back of the neck. During the breeding season the adult's plumage has white streaks over its entire head, giving them the common name of hoary-headed grebe. Juveniles have a white chin and throat and a striped face. Males have two plumage phases: after breeding they lose the buff breast and the white lines on the head, but can usually be identified then by the broad black bar down the nape.

== Distribution and habitat ==
The hoary-headed grebe is found in all states and territories of Australia. It is generally absent from the central arid regions of Australia. The hoary-headed grebe is usually found away from the shoreline in large open waters, which may be estuarine, brackish or freshwater. It can also be found in sheltered coastal seas. It can sometimes be found in New Zealand, where it is much less common than Australia.

== Food ==
The hoary-headed grebe feeds on aquatic arthropods, mostly caught by deep diving. This species feeds during the day, and when the light is poor, forages mostly at the water surface.

== Breeding ==
Hoary-headed grebes breed from August to January. The nests are a floating platform of water weeds, similar to that of the Australasian grebe, and usually some distance out from shore among sparse reeds or other plants, anchored to and at least partly supported by them. A shallow depression on top is just slightly above water, so the eggs are lying in water or dampness. The eggs are concealed under pieces of wet vegetation when the incubating parent leaves so that the nest appears empty. Under full sun the covered eggs are warm and moist, often left unattended for some time. The egg's appearance is oval, white, and soon stained brownish ochre, while the clutch is usually 2–5 eggs. Incubation is 20–24 days and egg size is 39 x 27 mm.

== Conservation ==
SW Queensland, Australia

With a large range and no evidence of significant population decline, this species' conservation status is of Least Concern.
