= Eutaxia epacridoides =

Scientific classification
- Kingdom: Plantae
- Clade: Tracheophytes
- Clade: Angiosperms
- Clade: Eudicots
- Clade: Rosids
- Order: Fabales
- Family: Fabaceae
- Subfamily: Faboideae
- Genus: Eutaxia
- Species: E. epacridoides

Binomial name
- Eutaxia epacridoides Meisn.

Species of legume

Eutaxia epacridoides is a species of flowering plant in the family Fabaceae and is endemic to south western parts of Western Australia.

The erect shrub has a spreading or slender habit and can reach a height of 0.2 to 1 m (7.9 in to 3 ft 3.4 in). It produces yellow to red or brown coloured flowers usually in Spring (season) between September and October.

It prefers sandy soils and is often found in swampy areas from around Bunbury in the north-west to just east of Albany in the south-east.
