= Eutaxia major =

Scientific classification
- Kingdom: Plantae
- Clade: Tracheophytes
- Clade: Angiosperms
- Clade: Eudicots
- Clade: Rosids
- Order: Fabales
- Family: Fabaceae
- Subfamily: Faboideae
- Genus: Eutaxia
- Species: E. major

Binomial name
- Eutaxia major (Benth.) C.F.Wilkins & Chappill

Synonyms
- Pultenaea neurocalyx var. major

Species of legume

Eutaxia inuncta is a species of flowering plant in the family Fabaceae and is endemic to the south-west of Western Australia.

The shrub has an erect and spindly habit with orange and brown coloured pea-like flowers that appear between August and November. It is found along the south coast in two areas, one centred around Fitzgerald River National Park in the west and the other around Cape Arid National Park in the east in the Goldfields-Esperance region of Western Australia.
