= Eutaxia nanophylla =

Conservation status
- Priority Three — Poorly Known Taxa (DEC)

Scientific classification
- Kingdom: Plantae
- Clade: Tracheophytes
- Clade: Angiosperms
- Clade: Eudicots
- Clade: Rosids
- Order: Fabales
- Family: Fabaceae
- Subfamily: Faboideae
- Genus: Eutaxia
- Species: E. nanophylla

Binomial name
- Eutaxia nanophylla Chappill & C.F.Wilkins

Species of legume

Eutaxia nanophylla is a species of flowering plant in the family Fabaceae and is endemic to southern parts of Western Australia.

The shrub has an erect and spindly habit and has yellow, orange and red coloured pea-like flowers that form between October and November. It has a scattered distribution from around Menzies in the north to the Shire of Kent in the south.
