= Eutaxia andocada =

Conservation status
- Priority One — Poorly Known Taxa (DEC)

Scientific classification
- Kingdom: Plantae
- Clade: Tracheophytes
- Clade: Angiosperms
- Clade: Eudicots
- Clade: Rosids
- Order: Fabales
- Family: Fabaceae
- Subfamily: Faboideae
- Genus: Eutaxia
- Species: E. andocada

Binomial name
- Eutaxia andocada Chappill & C.F.Wilkins

Species of legume

Eutaxia andocada is a species of flowering plant in the family Fabaceae and is endemic to the south-west of Western Australia.

The shrub has an erect and spindly habit with yellow and red coloured pea-like flowers that appear between August and September. It is found in a small area from disjunct populations around Salmon Gums in the Goldfields-Esperance region of Western Australia.
