= Eutaxia rubricarina =

Conservation status
- Priority Three — Poorly Known Taxa (DEC)

Scientific classification
- Kingdom: Plantae
- Clade: Tracheophytes
- Clade: Angiosperms
- Clade: Eudicots
- Clade: Rosids
- Order: Fabales
- Family: Fabaceae
- Subfamily: Faboideae
- Genus: Eutaxia
- Species: E. rubricarina

Binomial name
- Eutaxia rubricarina Chappill & C.F.Wilkins

Species of legume

Eutaxia rubricarina is a species of flowering plant in the family Fabaceae and is endemic to parts of Western Australia.

The shrub has a straggling habit and has yellow, orange and brown coloured pea-like flowers that form between August and October. It has a scattered distribution from around Beverley in the west to the Menzies in the east.
