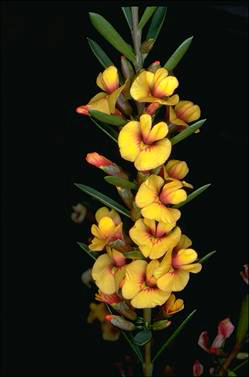

Scientific classification
- Kingdom: Plantae
- Clade: Tracheophytes
- Clade: Angiosperms
- Clade: Eudicots
- Clade: Rosids
- Order: Fabales
- Family: Fabaceae
- Subfamily: Faboideae
- Genus: Eutaxia
- Species: E. cuneata

Binomial name
- Eutaxia cuneata Meisn.

= Eutaxia cuneata =

Species of legume

Eutaxia cuneata is a species of flowering plant in the family Fabaceae and is endemic to the south-west of Western Australia. It is a slender, upright shrub with red and orange pea-like flowers.

== Description ==
Eutaxia cuneata is an upright shrub densely branched or occasionally sparsely branched, 0.3–1.6 m (1 ft 0 in – 5 ft 3 in) high and 0.6–1.3 m (2 ft 0 in – 4 ft 3 in) wide with glabrous, greyish brown to red brown stems. The leaves are arranged opposite, decussate, spreading, 2–17 mm (0.079–0.669 in) long, upper surface mid green, glabrous, lower surface smooth with a prominent mid-vein, grey-brown, cuneate, apex blunt or with a hard tip. The flowers are borne singly or in pairs in the leaf axils, bracteoles egg-shaped, reddish-brown, 0.6–1.3 mm (0.024–0.051 in) long, 0.4–0.6 mm (0.016–0.024 in) wide, smooth, margins and apex with occasional, spreading, straight hairs about 0.1 mm (0.0039 in) long, pedicels straight, sometimes curved under, and 1.5–4 mm (0.059–0.157 in) long. The flowers are orange-yellow, standard petal is 2–3 mm (0.079–0.118 in) long and 7.3–9.6 mm (0.29–0.38 in) wide, wings 1.5–2.8 mm (0.059–0.110 in) long, keel 1.5–2.3 mm (0.059–0.091 in) long, orange-red, straight, oblong shaped, smooth and the apex pointed. Flowering occurs from July to October and the fruit is elliptic shaped, 5–5.2–2 mm (0.197–0.205–0.079 in) long, 6–2.7 mm (0.24–0.11 in) wide, outer surface with occasional, flattened hairs about 0.2 mm (0.0079 in) long.

== Taxonomy and naming ==
Eutaxia cuneata was first formally described in 1844 and the description was published in Plantae Preissianae. The specific epithet (cuneata) means "wedge-shaped", usually refers to the leaves.

== Distribution and habitat ==
This pea grows in heath, woodland in a variety of soils near the south coast of Western Australia from Cheyne Beach to Ravensthorpe.
