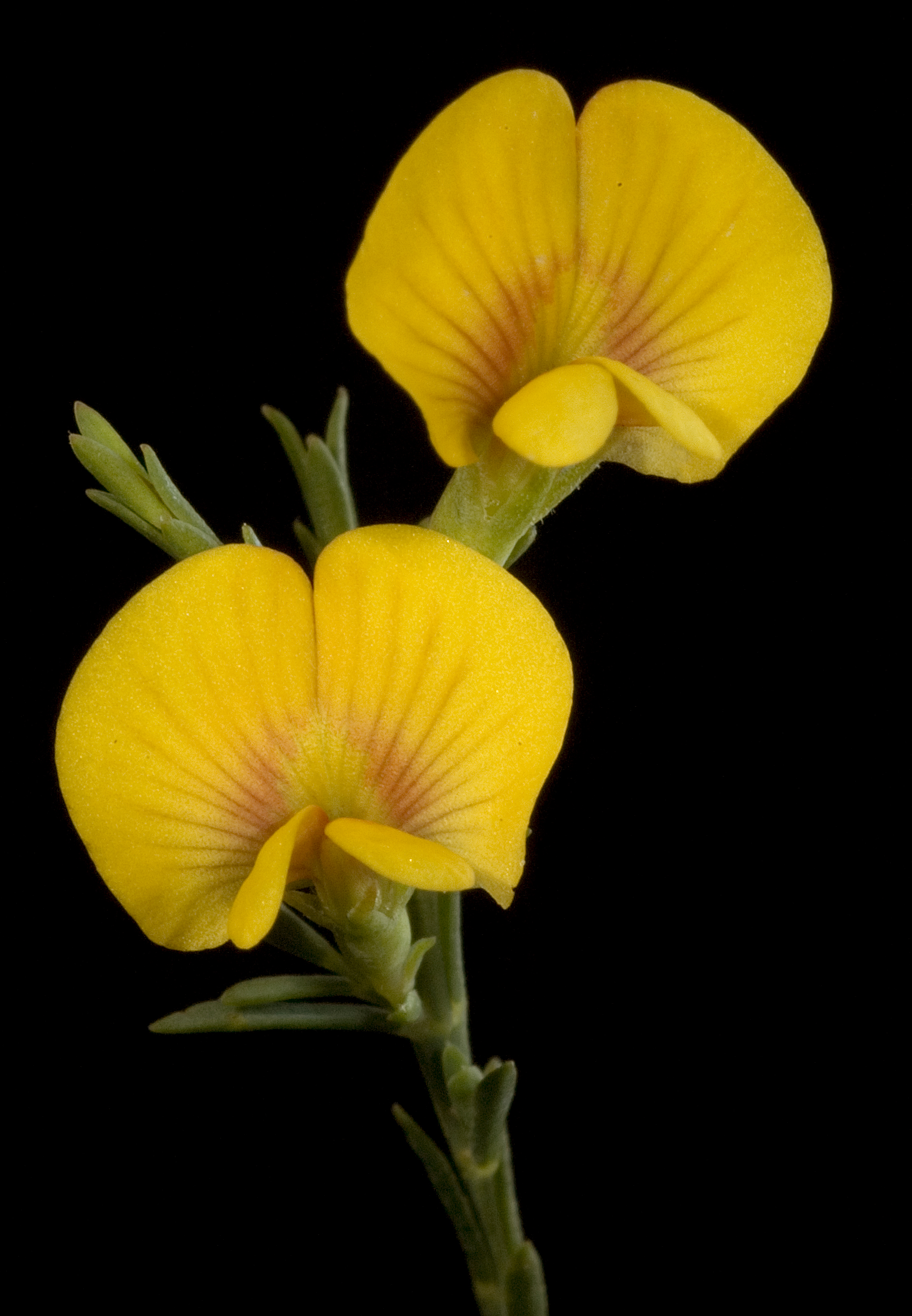

Scientific classification
- Kingdom: Plantae
- Clade: Tracheophytes
- Clade: Angiosperms
- Clade: Eudicots
- Clade: Rosids
- Order: Fabales
- Family: Fabaceae
- Subfamily: Faboideae
- Genus: Eutaxia
- Species: E. virgata

Binomial name
- Eutaxia virgata Benth.

= Eutaxia virgata =

Species of legume

Eutaxia virgata is a species of flowering plant in the family Fabaceae and is endemic to parts of Western Australia.

The shrub has slender and erect or straggling habit and has yellow, orange, red and brown coloured pea-like flowers that form between August and February. It is found in swampy areas from around Gingin in the north to the Albany in the south and as far as Woodanilling in the east.
