= Eutaxia actinophylla =

Conservation status
- Priority Three — Poorly Known Taxa (DEC)

Scientific classification
- Kingdom: Plantae
- Clade: Tracheophytes
- Clade: Angiosperms
- Clade: Eudicots
- Clade: Rosids
- Order: Fabales
- Family: Fabaceae
- Subfamily: Faboideae
- Genus: Eutaxia
- Species: E. actinophylla

Binomial name
- Eutaxia actinophylla Chappill & C.F.Wilkins

Synonyms
- Eutaxia verticillata

Species of legume

Eutaxia actinophylla is a species of flowering plant in the family Fabaceae and is endemic to the south-west of Western Australia.

The shrub has an erect and spindly habit with yellow and red coloured pea-like flowers that appear between September and October. It is found between Bruce Rock in the west, Coolgardie in the east and Esperance in the south in the Goldfields-Esperance region of Western Australia.
