= Eutaxia lutea =

Scientific classification
- Kingdom: Plantae
- Clade: Tracheophytes
- Clade: Angiosperms
- Clade: Eudicots
- Clade: Rosids
- Order: Fabales
- Family: Fabaceae
- Subfamily: Faboideae
- Genus: Eutaxia
- Species: E. lutea

Binomial name
- Eutaxia lutea Chappill & G.R.Hend

Species of legume

Eutaxia lutea is a species of flowering plant in the family Fabaceae and is endemic to southern parts of Western Australia.

The shrub has an upright and spindly habit and has yellow, pink and brown coloured pea-like flowers that form between September and October. It has a scattered distribution from around Lake King in the west to the Grass Patch in the east.
