= Eutaxia lasiocalyx =

Conservation status
- Priority Two — Poorly Known Taxa (DEC)

Scientific classification
- Kingdom: Plantae
- Clade: Tracheophytes
- Clade: Angiosperms
- Clade: Eudicots
- Clade: Rosids
- Order: Fabales
- Family: Fabaceae
- Subfamily: Faboideae
- Genus: Eutaxia
- Species: E. lasiocalyx

Binomial name
- Eutaxia lasiocalyx Chappill & C.F.Wilkins

Species of legume

Eutaxia lasiocalyx is a species of flowering plant in the family Fabaceae and is endemic to southern parts of Western Australia.

The shrub has a prostrate habit and spreads outwards it has yellow coloured pea-like flowers that in November. It is found in a small area to the south of Marvel Loch in the Goldfields-Esperance region of Western Australia.
