= Eutaxia empetrifolia =

Scientific classification
- Kingdom: Plantae
- Clade: Tracheophytes
- Clade: Angiosperms
- Clade: Eudicots
- Clade: Rosids
- Order: Fabales
- Family: Fabaceae
- Subfamily: Faboideae
- Genus: Eutaxia
- Species: E. empetrifolia

Binomial name
- Eutaxia empetrifolia Schltdl.

Species of plant

Eutaxia empetrifolia is a shrub species in the family Fabaceae. The species is endemic to Australia. It occurs in South Australia and the south-west of Western Australia.
