= Eutaxia inuncta =

Scientific classification
- Kingdom: Plantae
- Clade: Tracheophytes
- Clade: Angiosperms
- Clade: Eudicots
- Clade: Rosids
- Order: Fabales
- Family: Fabaceae
- Subfamily: Faboideae
- Genus: Eutaxia
- Species: E. inuncta

Binomial name
- Eutaxia inuncta C.F.Wilkins & Chappill

Species of legume

Eutaxia inuncta is a species of flowering plant in the family Fabaceae and is endemic to the south-west of Western Australia.

The shrub has an erect and spindly habit with yellow, orange and red coloured pea-like flowers that appear between August and November. It is found along the south coast between Ravensthorpe in the west and Cape Arid in the east in the Goldfields-Esperance region of Western Australia.
