= Euhesma lutea =

Scientific classification
- Kingdom: Animalia
- Phylum: Arthropoda
- Clade: Pancrustacea
- Class: Insecta
- Order: Hymenoptera
- Family: Colletidae
- Genus: Euhesma
- Species: E. lutea

Binomial name
- Euhesma lutea (Rayment, 1934)

Synonyms
- Euryglossa inconspicua lutea Rayment, 1934

Species of bee

Euhesma lutea, or Euhesma (Euhesma) lutea, is a species of bee in the family Colletidae and the subfamily Euryglossinae. It is endemic to Australia. It was described in 1934 by Australian entomologist Tarlton Rayment.

== Distribution and habitat ==
The species occurs in Western Australia. The type locality is Rottnest Island.

== Behaviour ==
The adults are flying mellivores.
