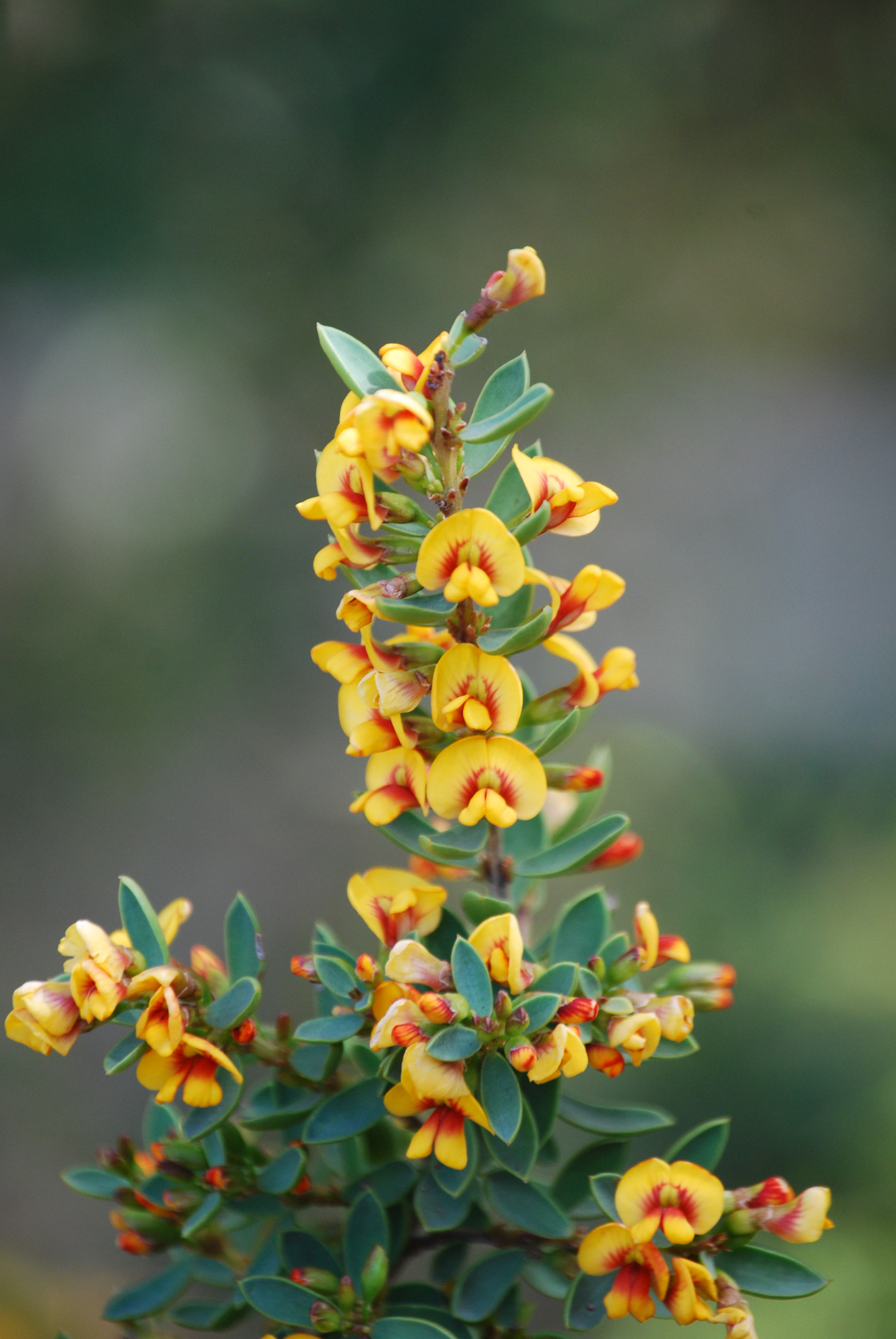
- Eutaxia myrtifolia

Scientific classification
- Kingdom: Plantae
- Clade: Tracheophytes
- Clade: Angiosperms
- Clade: Eudicots
- Clade: Rosids
- Order: Fabales
- Family: Fabaceae
- Subfamily: Faboideae
- Clade: Mirbelioids
- Genus: Eutaxia; R.Br.

Type species
- Eutaxia myrtifolia R.Br.

Sections and species
- See text.

Synonyms
- Sclerothamnus R.Br.

= Eutaxia =

Genus of legumes

Eutaxia is a genus of the family Fabaceae. They are native to Australia. Most are endemic to the Southwest Botanical Province of Western Australia, but a few are distributed throughout mainland Australia. The chromosome number of Eutaxia species is typically 2n = 14 or 16.

== Species ==
Eutaxia comprises the following species:

=== Section Eutaxia R.Br. ===
- Eutaxia cuneata Meissner
- Eutaxia epacridoides Meisn.
- Eutaxia exilis C.F.Wilkins & G.R.Hend.
- Eutaxia hirsuta C.F.Wilkins & Chappill
- Eutaxia inuncta C.F.Wilkins & Chappill
- Eutaxia lasiophylla G.R.Hend.
- Eutaxia lutea Chappill & G.R.Hend.
- Eutaxia major (Benth.) C.F.Wilkins & Chappill
- Eutaxia myrtifolia R. Br.
- Eutaxia neurocalyx (Turcz.) Chappill & G.R.Hend.
  - subsp. nacta C.F.Wilkins
  - subsp. neurocalyx (Turcz.) Chappill & G.R.Hend.
  - subsp. papillosa C.F.Wilkins
- Eutaxia parvifolia Benth.
- Eutaxia virgata Benth.

=== Section Sclerothamnus (R.Br.) F.Muell. ===
- Eutaxia acanthoclada G.R.Hend. & Chappill
- Eutaxia actinophylla Chappill & C.F.Wilkins
- Eutaxia andocada Chappill & C.F.Wilkins
- Eutaxia diffusa F.Muell.—Spreading eutaxia
- Eutaxia empetrifolia Schltdl.
- Eutaxia lasiocalyx Chappill & C.F.Wilkins
- Eutaxia leptophylla Turcz.
- Eutaxia microphylla (R.Br.) C.H.Wright & Dewar—Common eutaxia
- Eutaxia nanophylla Chappill & C.F.Wilkins
- Eutaxia rubricarina Chappill & C.F.Wilkins
