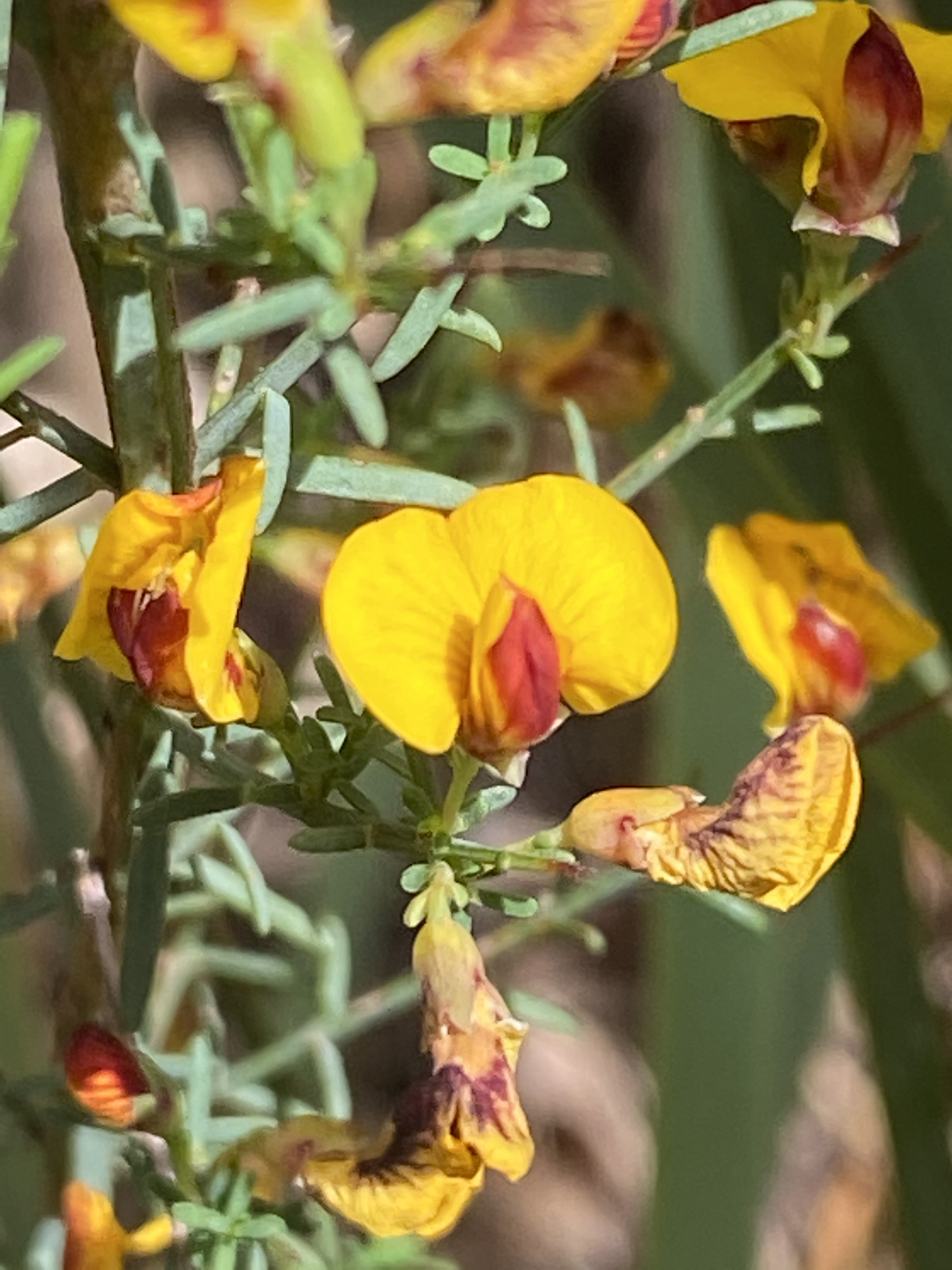

Scientific classification
- Kingdom: Plantae
- Clade: Tracheophytes
- Clade: Angiosperms
- Clade: Eudicots
- Clade: Rosids
- Order: Fabales
- Family: Fabaceae
- Subfamily: Faboideae
- Genus: Eutaxia
- Species: E. microphylla

Binomial name
- Eutaxia microphylla (R.Br.) J.M.Black

Synonyms
- Sclerothamnus microphyllus R.Br.; Eutaxia leptophylla Turcz.; Eutaxia microphylla J.M.Black

= Eutaxia microphylla =

Common eutaxia

Species of plant

Eutaxia microphylla, also known as common eutaxia, is a shrub species in the family Fabaceae. The species is endemic to Australia.

== Description ==
Plants grow to between 30 and 40 centimetres high. The small, grey green, narrow to ovate leaves are 2.3 to 4 mm long and 0.6 to 0.9 mm wide. The single pea flowers have dark red keels, yellow-orange wings, and a yellow-orange standard with red markings on the rear. These are produced between July and October in the species' native range.

== Taxonomic history ==
The species was formally described by botanist Robert Brown in 1811 in Hortus Kewensis. Brown gave it the name Sclerothamnus microphyllus. The specific epithet (microphylla) is derived from the ancient Greek words mikros (μικρός), meaning "small" and phyllon (φύλλον), meaning "leaf", alluding to the plant's small leaves. The species was transferred to the genus Eutaxia in 1894. Another species described by Ferdinand von Mueller in 1858, Eutaxia diffusa, was reclassified as a subspecies of Eutaxia microphylla in 1957, however Mueller's original name was reinstated in 2010.

== Distribution ==
Eutaxia microphylla is recorded across southern South Australia and north-eastern Tasmania. In Victoria it predominantly occurs in the west of the state and in New South Wales it is recorded in mallee and Mugga Ironbark communities to the west of the Great Dividing Range. Associated genera include Acacia, Eucalyptus and Eremopila.

== Ecology ==
Caterpillars of the Fringed Blue butterfly feed on this species.
