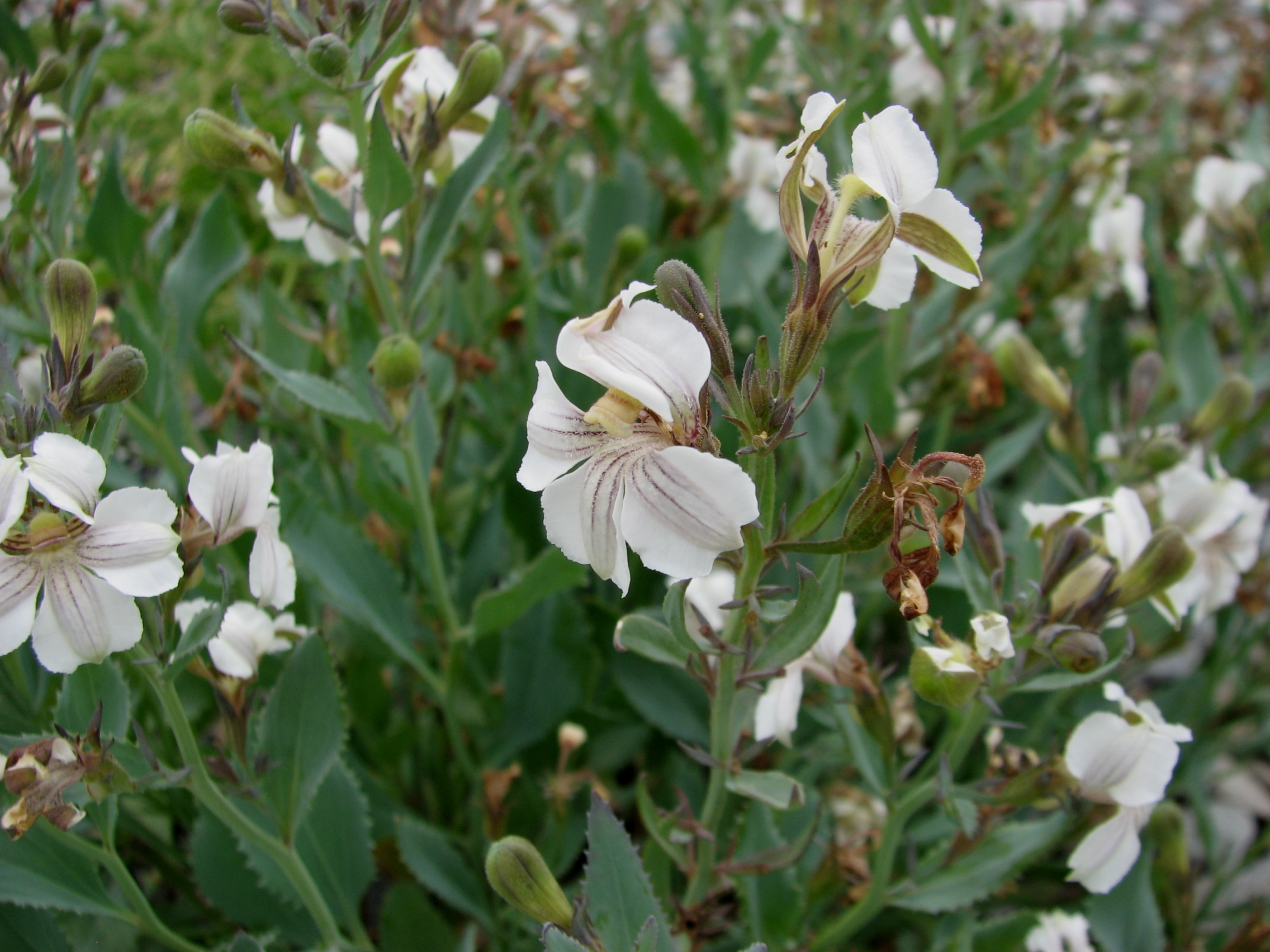
- Goodenia albiflora in the Royal Botanic Gardens, Cranbourne

Scientific classification
- Kingdom: Plantae
- Clade: Tracheophytes
- Clade: Angiosperms
- Clade: Eudicots
- Clade: Asterids
- Order: Asterales
- Family: Goodeniaceae
- Genus: Goodenia
- Species: G. albiflora

Binomial name
- Goodenia albiflora Schltdl.

Synonyms
- Goodenia grandiflora var. albiflora (Schltdl.) K.Krause; Picrophyta albiflora (Schltdl.) F.Muell.

= Goodenia albiflora =

White goodenia

Species of plant

Goodenia albiflora, commonly known as white goodenia, is a species of flowering plant in the family Goodeniaceae and endemic to South Australia. It is a small, erect shrub with ridged stems, elliptic to egg-shaped, cauline leaves, racemes of white flowers with leaf-like bracteoles at the base, and oval fruit.

== Description ==
Goodenia albiflora is an erect, glaucous shrub that typically grows to a height of 70 cm (28 in) and has ridged stems. The leaves are cauline, elliptic to egg-shaped, 30–70 mm (1.2–2.8 in) long and 15–40 mm (0.59–1.57 in) wide with wavy or serrated edges. The flowers are arranged in racemes up to 100 mm (3.9 in) long on a peduncle 2–4 mm (0.079–0.157 in) long with lance-shaped, leaf-like bracteoles about 3 mm (0.12 in) long at the base, each flower on a pedicel 1–2 mm (0.039–0.079 in) long. The sepals are lance-shaped, 5–6 mm (0.20–0.24 in) long and the corolla is white, 15–20 mm (0.59–0.79 in) long with hairs inside. The lower lobes of the corolla are 10 mm (0.39 in) long with wings 2.5–3 mm (0.098–0.118 in) wide. Flowering mainly occurs from October to January and the fruit is an oval capsule about 10 mm (0.39 in) long.

== Taxonomy and naming ==
Goodenia albiflora was first formally described in 1847 by Diederich Franz Leonhard von Schlechtendal in the journal Linnaea: ein Journal für die Botanik in ihrem ganzen Umfange, oder Beiträge zur Pflanzenkunde. The specific epithet (albiflora) means "white-flowered".

== Distribution and habitat ==
White goodenia grows in stony soil on steep slopes in woodland from the Eyre Peninsula to the Flinders Ranges and Mount Lofty Ranges of South Australia.
