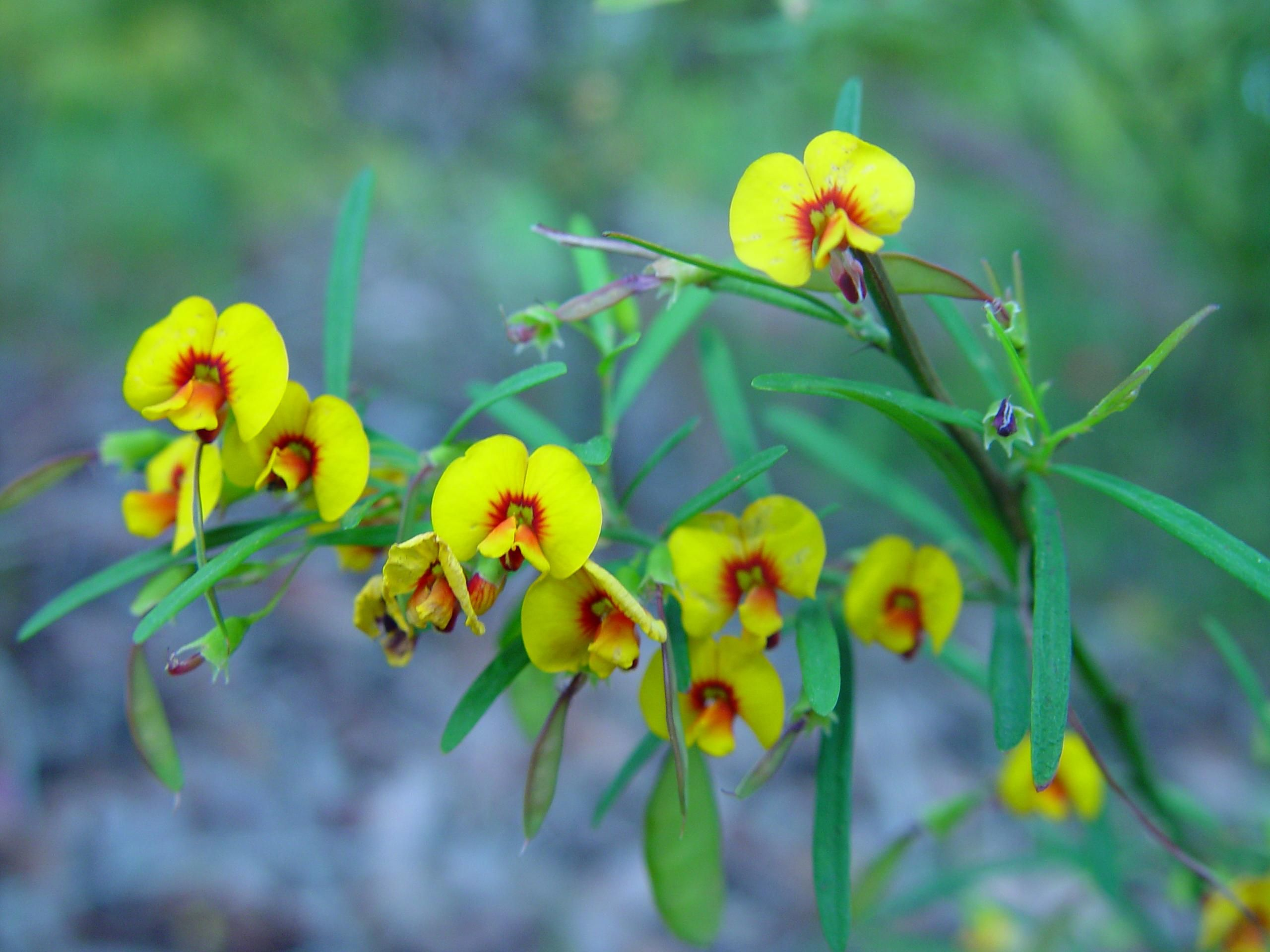

Scientific classification
- Kingdom: Plantae
- Clade: Embryophytes
- Clade: Tracheophytes
- Clade: Spermatophytes
- Clade: Angiosperms
- Clade: Eudicots
- Clade: Rosids
- Order: Fabales
- Family: Fabaceae
- Subfamily: Faboideae
- Genus: Eutaxia
- Species: E. parvifolia

Binomial name
- Eutaxia parvifolia Benth.

Synonyms
- Dillwynia incerta Domin; Eutaxia densifolia Turcz.; Eutaxia dillwynioides Meisn.; Eutaxia obovata Turcz.; Eutaxia parvifolia Benth. isonym; Eutaxia parvifolia Benth. isonym; Pultenaea incerta Domin nom. inval., pro syn.

= Eutaxia parvifolia =

Species of legume

Eutaxia parvifolia is a species of flowering plant in the family Fabaceae and is endemic to southwestern Western Australia. It is a shrub with reddish brown stems, elliptic to egg-shaped leaves with the narrower end towards the base, and mostly yellow, red or orange flowers, with yellow red or orange markings.

== Description ==
Eutaxia parvifolia is an erect or prostrate, spindly, densely branched shrub that typically grows to a height of 0.2–2 m (7.9 in – 6 ft 6.7 in) and has reddish-brown, glabrous stems. The leaves are arranged in opposite pairs, elliptic to egg-shaped with the narrower end towards the base, 2.5–17 mm (0.098–0.669 in) long and 1–3 mm (0.039–0.118 in) wide on a petiole 1–3 mm (0.039–0.118 in) long. The flowers are arranged singly in leaf axils, often crowded near the ends of branchlets, each flower on a pedicel 1–2.4 mm (0.039–0.094 in) long. The sepals are ribbed and hairy, 4.5–7 mm (0.18–0.28 in) long and fused at the base. The petals are mostly yellow, red or orange with yellow, red or orange spots, streaks or blotches. The upright "standard" petal is 7.5–9 mm (0.30–0.35 in) long, the two "wing" petals 5.5–7.8 mm (0.22–0.31 in) long and the "keel" enclosing the stamens is 5–5.7 mm (0.20–0.22 in) long. Flowering occurs from August to December and the fruit is 4.5–7 mm (0.18–0.28 in) long and 2–3.5 mm (0.079–0.138 in) wide'

== Taxonomy ==
Eutaxia parvifolia was formally described in 1837 by English botanist George Bentham in Enumeratio plantarum quas in Novae Hollandiae ora austro-occidentali ad fluvium Cygnorum et in sinu Regis Georgii collegit Carolus Liber Baro de Hügel, based on plant material collected by Charles von Hügel in King George Sound. The specific epithet (parvifolia) means "small-leaved".

== Distribution and habitat ==
This eutaxia grows in heath and woodland between Bolgart, Albany and the Cape Arid National Park.

== Conservation status ==
Eutaxia parvifolia is classified as "not threatened" by the Government of Western Australia Department of Parks and Wildlife.
