= Cobar Peneplain =

Cobar Peneplain New South Wales
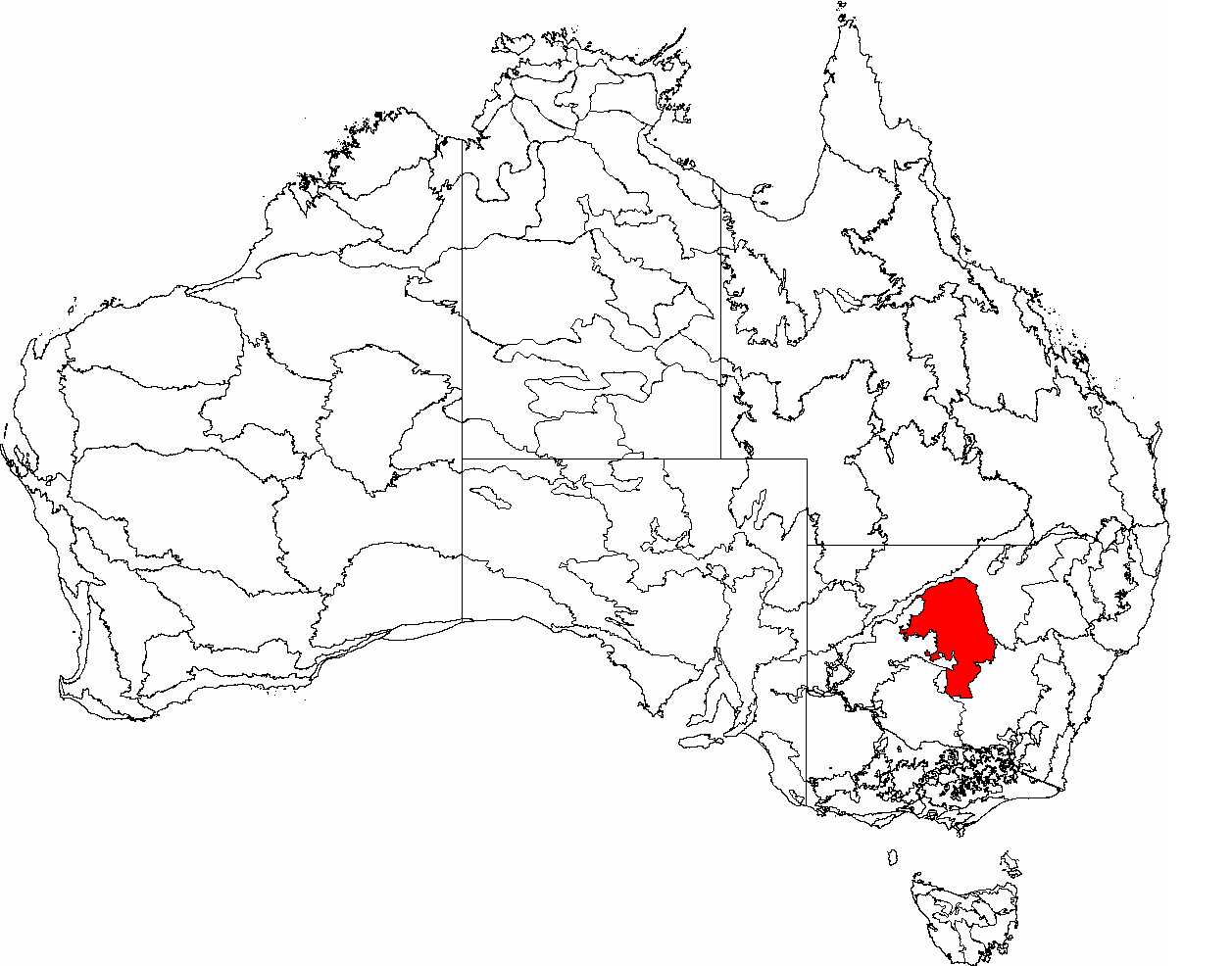
- The interim Australian bioregions, with Cobar Peneplain in red
- Area: 73,853.46 km^{2} (28,515.0 sq mi)
Localities around Cobar Peneplain:
Murray Darling Depression	Darling Riverine Plains	Darling Riverine Plains
Murray Darling Depression	Cobar Peneplain	Darling Riverine Plains
Riverina	NSW South Western Slopes	NSW South Western Slopes

Cobar Peneplain, an interim Australian bioregion, is located in New South Wales, and comprises 7,385,346 hectares (18,249,590 acres).

The bioregion has the code COP. There are five subregions.

IBRA regions and subregions: IBRA7
IBRA region / subregion	IBRA code	Area	States	Location in Australia
Cobar Peneplain	COP	7,385,346 hectares (18,249,590 acres)	NSW	
Boorindal Plains	COP1	400,236 hectares (989,000 acres)	NSW	
Barnato Downs	COP2	1,773,542 hectares (4,382,520 acres)	NSW	
Canbelego Downs	COP3	2,001,425 hectares (4,945,630 acres)	NSW	
Nymagee	COP4	2,070,061 hectares (5,115,230 acres)	NSW	
Lachlan Plains	COP5	1,140,082 hectares (2,817,200 acres)	NSW	

== See also ==
- Geography of Australia
