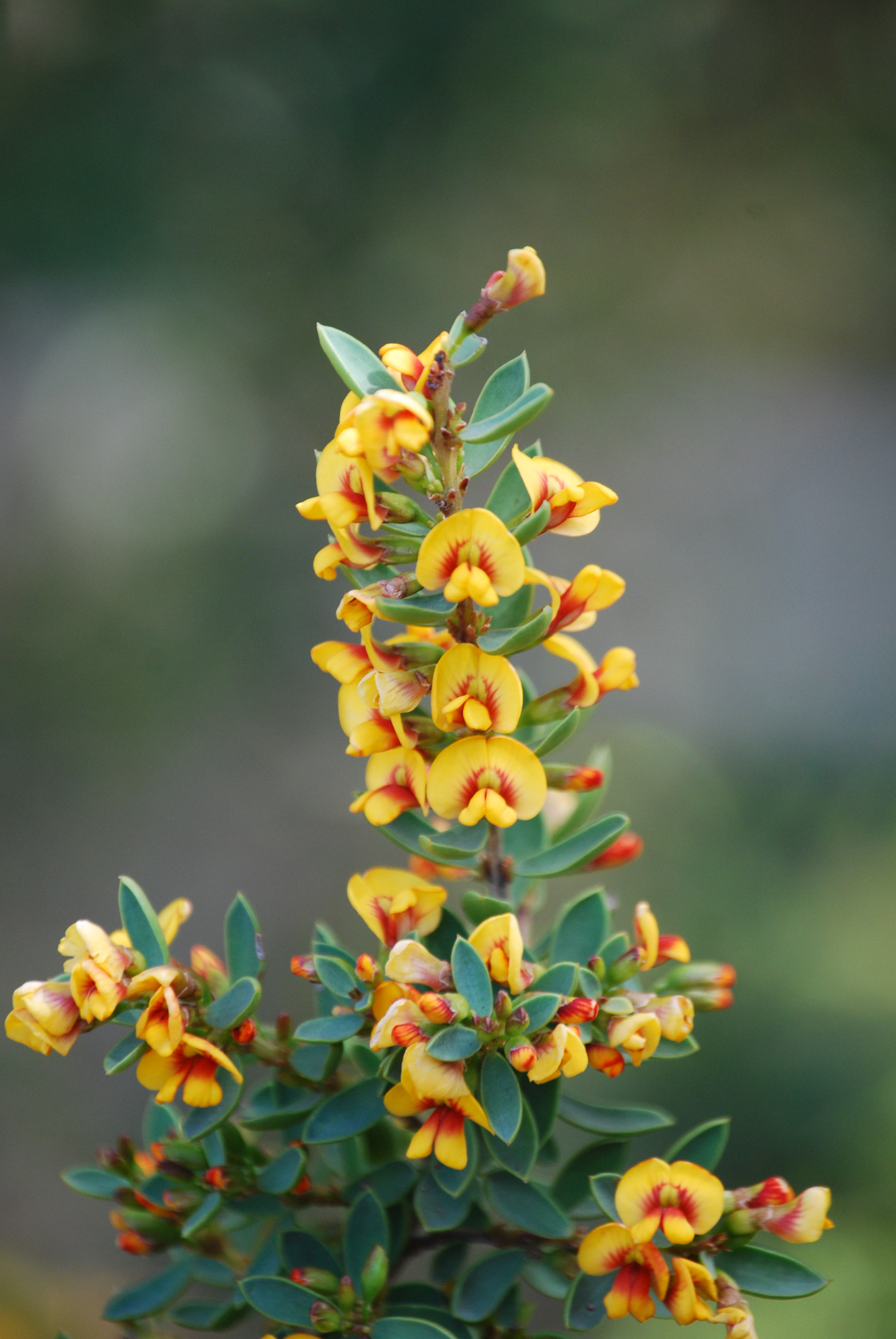

Scientific classification
- Kingdom: Plantae
- Clade: Tracheophytes
- Clade: Angiosperms
- Clade: Eudicots
- Clade: Rosids
- Order: Fabales
- Family: Fabaceae
- Subfamily: Faboideae
- Genus: Eutaxia
- Species: E. myrtifolia

Binomial name
- Eutaxia myrtifolia (Sm.) R.Br.

Synonyms
- Dillwynia myrtifolia Sm.; Dillwynia obovata Labill.; Eutaxia obovata C.A.Gardner; Eutaxia obovata (Labill.) C.A.Gardner nom. illeg.; Eutaxia baxteri Knowles & Westc.

= Eutaxia myrtifolia =

Species of legume

Eutaxia myrtifolia, also commonly known as egg and bacon plant or bush pea, is shrub species in the family Fabaceae. It is endemic to Western Australia. Plants may be prostrate or up to 2 metres high. Yellow and red flowers are produced throughout the year in the species' native range. It occurs in woodland, shrubland and heath in the coastal region between Cape Naturaliste and Cape Arid.

== Description ==
The plant can have a scrambling prostrate habit and can grow to a height and width of about 2 m (6 ft 7 in) or a spindly broom like appearance with terete and glabrous stems. The flat, evergreen and glabrous phylloclades or leaves are arranged oppositely with a length of 10 to 2.5 mm (0.394 to 0.098 in) and a width of 2 to 5 mm (0.079 to 0.197 in) and have a flat of recurved margin. Stipules can be absent or present and persisting to older leaves. The flowers are attached via 4 to 5 mm (0.16 to 0.20 in) long glabrous pedicels. The flowers are yellow and orange to red in colour and appear from May to July to January or February.

== Distribution ==
E. myrtifolia can be found growing in mossy areas, along watercourses, in swampy areas and among rocky outcrops growing in peaty sand or sandy clay loam soils over granite or quartzite. It is found along the south west and south coast from Busselton in the north west to around Esperance in the south east.

== Cultivation ==
The species has a reputation as a reliable shrub in cultivation where it has usually been known by the names of Dillwynia obovata or Eutaxia obovata. It is well suited to being grown in rockeries, containers, or other situations providing good drainage. It is resistant to mild frosts and can be grown in coastal areas, with some protection. Pruning after flowering promotes more compact growth. Cultivated plants usually range between 0.75 and 1 metre high, and slightly less in width. Plants may be propagated from cuttings or scarified seed.
