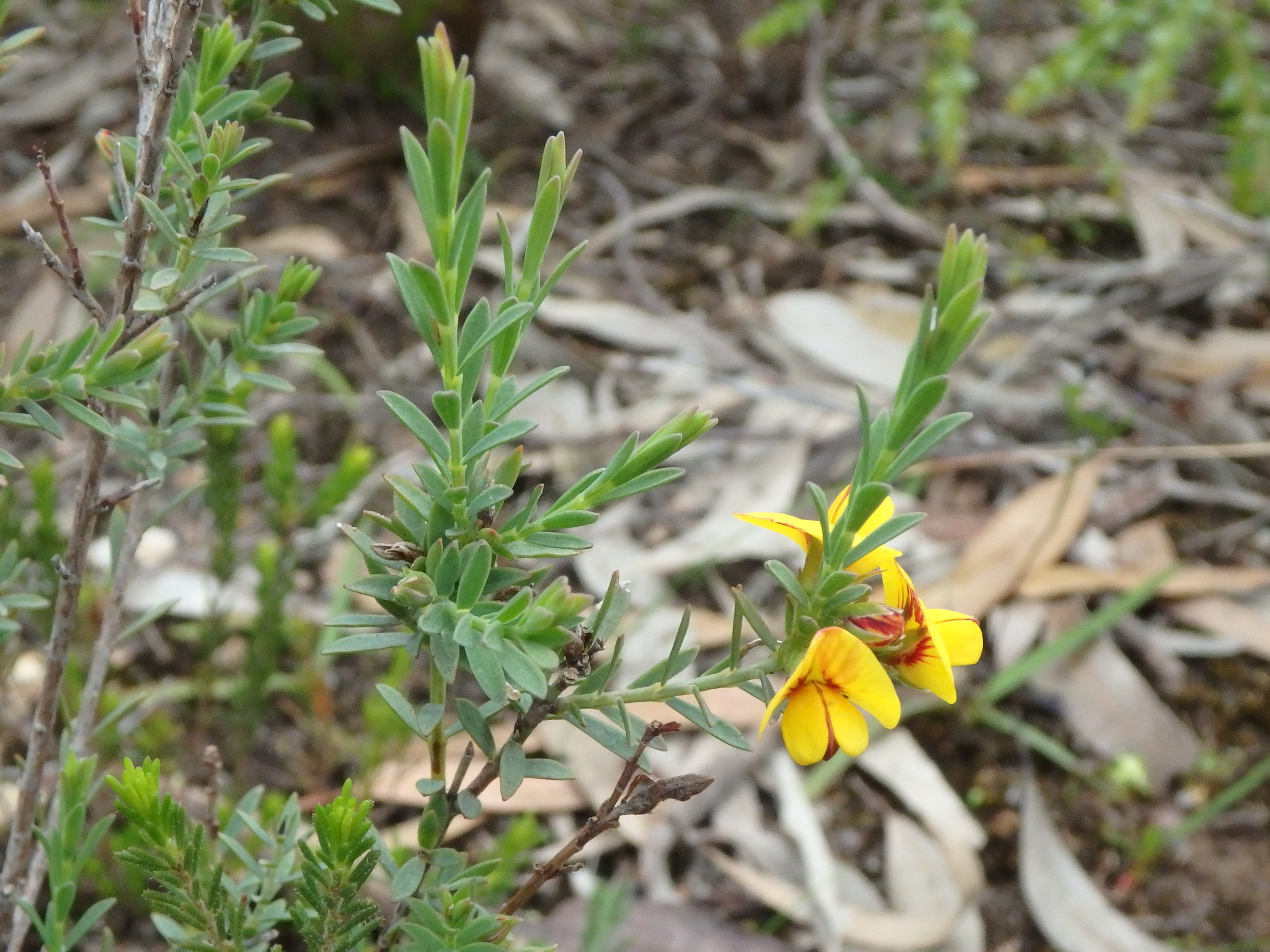

Scientific classification
- Kingdom: Plantae
- Clade: Tracheophytes
- Clade: Angiosperms
- Clade: Eudicots
- Clade: Rosids
- Order: Fabales
- Family: Fabaceae
- Subfamily: Faboideae
- Genus: Eutaxia
- Species: E. diffusa

Binomial name
- Eutaxia diffusa F.Muell.

= Eutaxia diffusa =

Species of plant

Eutaxia diffusa, commonly known as spreading eutaxia, is a shrub species in the family Fabaceae. The species is endemic to Australia.

== Description ==
Plants grow to between 0.5 and 1 metre high with a similar spread. The small, grey green, obovate (or narrow obovate) leaves are lighter coloured beneath and have an acute tip. The single pea flowers have orange-yellow keels, yellow wings and a yellow standard that may have red markings. These are produced between August and October in the species' native range and are followed in November by ellipsoid fruits that are around 5.5 mm long and 4 mm wide.

== Taxonomic history ==
Eutaxia diffusa was named by Victorian Government Botanist Ferdinand von Mueller in 1858, when his original description was published in the first volume of his Fragmenta Phytographiae Australiae. The specific epithet derives from the Latin word diffusa, meaning spreading widely or loosely. It is thought to be a reference to either its spreading habit or relatively uncrowded leaves.

The species was reclassified as a subspecies of Eutaxia microphylla in 1957 before Mueller's original name was reinstated in 2010.

== Distribution ==
Eutaxia diffusa has a range that extends from Inglewood in Queensland southwards through New South Wales, where it is recorded in mallee communities, and in to south-western Victoria and westward across to South Australia. Associated tree species include Eucalyptus behriana, Acacia trineura and Melaleuca lanceolata.

== Ecology ==
Caterpillars of the Fringed Blue butterfly feed on this species.
