= Gemma Robyn Henderson =

Australian botanist

- Born: 1976 (age 49–50)
- Known for: Botany
- Scientific career
- Author abbrev. (botany): G.R.Hend.

Gemma Robyn Henderson (born 1976) is an Australian botanist.

Henderson commenced the revision of Eutaxia as a part of her honours project at the University of Western Australia.
