= Tuggeranong railway station =

Former railway station in New South Wales, Australia

Tuggeranong
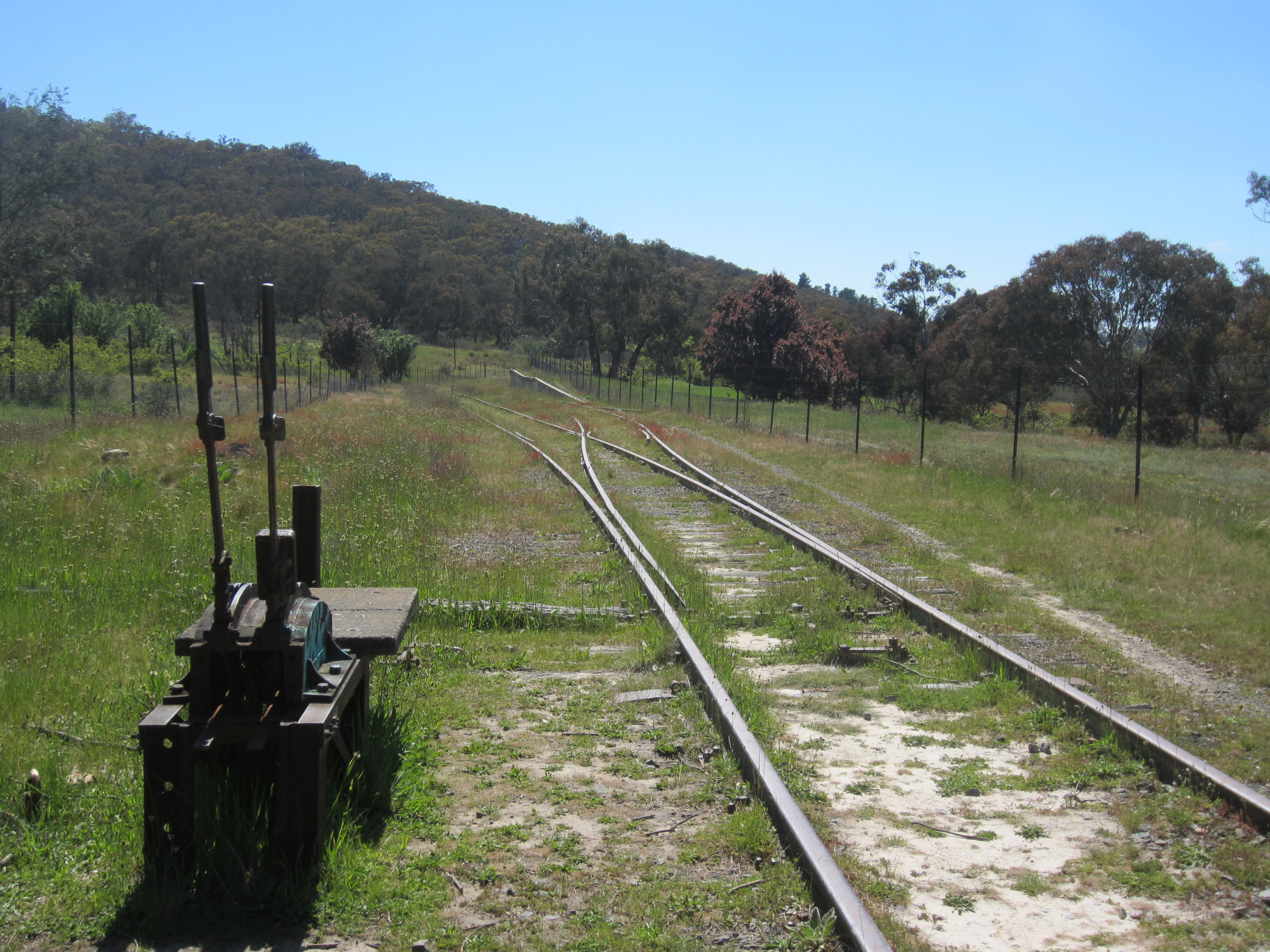
- Tuggeranong Siding with loading ramp at rear right (Oct 2021). The station platform once stood in the space to the left of the now-disused railway line.

General information
- Location: Old Tuggeranong Road, Tralee, New South Wales 2901; Australia
- Coordinates: 35°26′00″S 149°08′36″E
- Line: Bombala railway line
- Platforms: 1
- Tracks: 1

Other information
- Status: Closed

History
- Opened: 8 December 1887
- Closed: 8 February 1976

Services
Preceding station	Former services	Following station
Royalla towards Bombala	Bombala Line	Letchworth towards Sydney
Location

Tuggeranong railway with buildings 1920s Tuggeranong railway 1980s? Confirmation required.

Tuggeranong is a former railway station, sometimes referred to as Tuggeranong Siding or Tuggeranong Platform, that was located on a now-disused portion of the Bombala railway line.

Situated in the historic Parish of Tuggeranong, the station also shared its name with the nearby Grazing and Dairy Farm of Tuggeranong. Most of the land encompassed by the Parish was transferred from New South Wales to the Australian Capital Territory in 1911. Today Tuggeranong is a suburban district in Canberra, however the former station site is just over the border in New South Wales. The former station predates the suburban district by over eight decades, and it closed just over two years after the suburban district was inaugurated.

The station's 'mileage' was originally 202 miles 71 chains (around 326.5 km), by rail from Sydney—via the older Picton-Mittagong route—but, at the time it closed, its 'mileage' was 335.629 km.

It lies at the start of a large bend, in the railway line, known as the 'Horseshoe Bend', that skirts the Melrose Valley—formed by Dunn's Creek and its tributaries, and which is a part of the upper catchment of Tuggeranong Creek—as the line climbs toward Royalla. As a result, the railway line runs generally from south-west to north-east at this location.

The railway line from Queanbeyan to Michelago via Tuggeranong opened to traffic on 7 December 1887.

The station platform and its waiting room were on the northern side of the line. The station building was described as "a weatherboard waiting-shed 30ft. x 15ft., with iron roof, built on pile foundations." The station platform was 264 feet long by 12 feet wide, and the siding 12 chains in length. The siding was a dead-end siding connected to the main line, at the 'up' end only, by a set of manually operated double-ended points, with the points on the siding track acting as a catch point. There was also a level crossing of what is now Old Tuggeranong Road.

Nearby, on the hill south-west of the station site, was a Travelling Stock Reserve, in recent years known as the Old Tuggeranong TSR—now Melrose Nature Reserve and part of Canberra Nature Park—into which livestock were herded before or after being carried by rail.

The platform and waiting room were not the only structures at the site. A photograph taken in 1920 shows several other small structures associated with the stock pens for the loading ramp and the railway fettlers that were stationed at Tuggeranong. The fettler's (ganger) cottage was removed in the 1950s.

== History ==
Tuggeranong station opened as part of the Goulburn to Cooma Railway (later the Bombala line) on Wednesday 7 December 1887, when a Government mail train and company passenger train ran from Queanbeyan to Michelago station for an inauguration lunch. The lunch was attended by around 200 people, including Alexander Ryrie MLA and railway contractor Mr A Johnston.

During its heyday, the station and its siding serviced the relatively low population that was associated with the grazing properties and small settlements of the Tuggeranong Valley. In its first year of operation, Tuggeranong was served by a mixed mail and passenger up train to Goulburn departing around 8pm weekdays and a Saturday evening passenger service departing around 7pm. The mixed down train arrived from Goulburn around 7.30am, except on Mondays, when the train arrived at around 12.15pm. By 1900, locals were calling for a faster rail service between Cooma and Goulburn that would shave two hours off the journey with shorter stops at intermediate stations.

Over the years, the station formed a local meeting point. The family and household staff of noted plant breeder Willian Farrer and his wife Nina were known to hold their annual Easter picnic and sports at Tuggeranong Siding, five miles from their Lambrigg homestead in Tharwa. It was during one such picnic at the siding in April 1906 that news reached his niece of his failing health and ultimate death.

Railway fettler Isaac Harrison, who was stationed at Tuggeranong station, was run over by a train in February 1910. He was removed to Queanbeyan hospital with two broken legs and died about two hours later. The tragedy made news nationally and at an inquest later that month received a verdict of accidental death.

Tragedy would strike Tuggeranong Station again in 1936, when the daughter of the resident fettler James Blake drowned in the Murrumbidgee river at Point Hut Crossing around five miles away. Annie Blake, aged 16, had been endeavouring to assist her father and brother who themselves had found themselves in difficulty in the water during a family picnic on Christmas Day. Annie was pronounced life extinct at the scene and taken to Canberra Hospital morgue.

Unlike other larger stations nearby, Tuggeranong lacked livestock trucking yards. A request in 1936 to the New South Wales Railway department for the provision of trucking yards was declined, as it was deemed that facilities in nearby Queanbeyan were adequate to serve the area. The same request was again declined in 1937. In 1949, after years of local lobbying, the Commissioner for Railways agreed to provide a standard concrete-faced loading bank to accommodate three trucks, which remains today.

On Thursday 29 March, 1951 fire broke out at Tuggeranong station when sparks from a passing goods train ignited grass in a nearby cutting around 9am. The fire spread quickly and destroyed over 1,000 acres of grassland in one day. The fire was initially fought by the Queanbeyan, ACT and Tuggeranong Bush Fire Brigades, before a call was put out over local radio for further volunteers. Local Canberra office workers and 60 volunteer sailors from Harman joined the Brigades to bring the fire under control. Over 200 men fought the fire, saving the station itself, local properties and the village of Michelago.

By the early 1960s, the station was served by the Cooma Mail and Canberra Monaro Express. A journey from Tuggeranong to Cooma on the express service took one hour and fifty nine minutes.

Its importance decreased with improvements in the area's roads—particularly the Monaro Highway—and road transport in general, from the 1930s and particularly after the 1950s. The station closed completely on Sunday February 8, 1976 along with four other stations (Colinton, Bukalong, Bunyan and Chakola) on the Bombala line, and was subsequently demolished. The railway closed to through passenger trains in November 1988 and to freight in 1990. A heritage tourist train passed through Tuggeranong station from 1993, when the 49 kilometre section between Queanbeyan and Michelago was re-opened in April 1993 for operation by the ACT Division of the Australian Railway Historical Society. The line was truncated to Royalla as it deteriorated, until finally being suspended at the beginning of 2007 as a result of storm damage. No trains have passed Tuggeranong station since.

== Remnants ==
The railway line, siding, points, and loading ramp still exist near the former site of the station. There is nothing left of the platform, station buildings, or other structures. Land on either side of the railway line, which was part of the original railway corridor, has been enclosed by fencing. That includes the land south of the line, which was formerly enclosed as stock pens for the loading ramp. The NSW-ACT border is therefore at the locked gate across Old Tuggeranong Road, south of the railway line, not at the closest fence line to the railway tracks.

The area around the former station's site is part of a number of walking trails. Old Tuggeranong Road is closed to general public vehicular traffic.

== External links section ==
- NSW Railnet: Tuggeranong
- Photograph of Tuggeranong station and siding in 1920
- ACT Railway Border Walk
