= Great White Train =

Former rail service in Australia

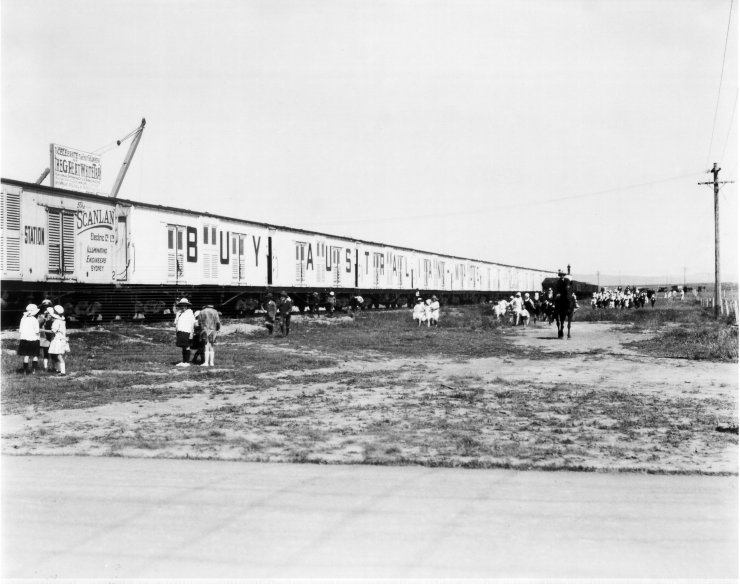
- The Great White Train at Kingston railway yards in Canberra

Overview
- Service type: Exhibition train
- Locale: New South Wales
- First service: 11 November 1925 – 20 May 1926
- Last service: 25 August 1926 – 22 November 1926
- Former operator: New South Wales Government Railways

Route
- Termini: Darling Harbour Yard; Darling Harbour Yard
- Stops: 100
- Distance travelled: 6,500 kilometres (4,000 mi)

Technical
- Track gauge: 1,435 mm (4 ft 8 1/2 in)

The Great White Train was an effort in the 1920s by Sydney based industrialists to convince Australians to Buy Australian Made products.

== Background ==
The concept was put forward by the Australia Made Preference League, a consortium of New South Wales manufacturers with the Government of New South Wales contributing £5,000 to the project. Two journeys were made, the first from 11 November 1925 until 20 May 1926, the second from 25 August to 22 November 1926.

== Composition of the train ==
The train comprised one Class 36 locomotive, two Pullman carriages, one dining car, one sleeping car, 15 exhibition coaches and a van. At 309 metres, it was the longest ever train to operate in Australia.

Radio station 2XT was part of AWA Technology Services's contribution to the train. The station was set up at each town and broadcast to the local community but was heard as far away as New Zealand with a clear signal. The sale of crystal radios to rural customers was one of the results but on the train's departure they had to make do with static filled reception from Sydney. It was generally open from 09:00 until 22:30.

== Exhibitors ==
The exhibitors were: Aeroplane Flour, Angus & Robertson, Ashton Soap & Candle, Australian Forests, Australian Linoleum Co, AWA, Ball Phonograph, Beale & Co, Bebarfalds, Berlei, BHP, Bonds, Caldwell's Wines, Clifford Love & Co, Clinton-Williams, Davis Gelatine Co, Federal Distilleries, Gartwell White, Hunts Oil & Gas Co, Isherwood & Bartlett, James Stedman-Henderson Sweets, John Vicars & Co, Jusfrute Products, Lewis Berger & Sons, Mangrovite Belting, Nestle's Anglo-Swiss Condensed Milk Co, Newlands Bros, RC Henderson Ltd, Queensland Insurance Co, Sydney Williams Ltd, Tooth & Co, Tucker and Co, Vitavox Phonograph, Water Conservation & Irrigation Commission, WD & HO Wills, WH Plumb

== Journeys ==
The train made two journeys in New South Wales after being loaded at Darling Harbour Yard. Journalist and ex-politician Wallace Nelson was an official lecturer on the tour.

The first tour commenced on 11 November 1925 and concluded on 20 May 1926, there was a Christmas break from 22 December to 4 January. The towns visited were: Gosford, Newcastle, West Maitland, Cessnock, Singleton, Muswellbrook, Scone, Murrurundi, Quirindi, Werris Creek, Tamworth, Armidale, Binnaway, Merrygoen, Dunedoo, Gulgong, Mudgee, Rylstone, Lithgow, Bathurst, Blayney, Lyndhurst, Cowra, Orange, Wellington, Dubbo, Narromine, Peak Hill, Parkes, Forbes, Stockinbingal, Temora, Ariah Park, Ardlethan, Barellan, Griffith, Leeton, Yanco, Narrandera, Ganmain, Coolamon, Junee, Wagga Wagga, Henty, Culcairn, Albury, Brocklesby, Corowa, The Rock, Cootamundra, Wallendbeen, Young, Harden, Yass, Gunning, Goulburn, Moss Vale, Mittagong, Liverpool, Sydney and Granville

The second tour commenced on 25 August 1926 and concluded on 22 November 1926 visiting: Newcastle, East Maitland, Dungog, Gloucester, Wingham, Taree, Kendall, Wauchope, Kempsey, Macksville, Urunga, Raleigh, Coffs Harbour, Corumba, Glenreagh, South Grafton, Grafton, Rappville, Casino, Kyogle, Lismore, Bangalow, Byron Bay, Mullumbimby Murwillumbah, Thirroul, Wollongong, Berry, Nowra, Tarago, Michelago, Cooma, Nimmitabel, Bombala, Canberra, Queanbeyan, Bungendore, Botany, Mascot, Rockdale and Hurstville

== In popular culture ==
The movie Undercover made in 1983 about the Berlei company contained a segment on a recreation of the train filmed at Taralga and on the Picton–Mittagong loop railway line.
