= Burbong railway station =

Former railway station in New South Wales, Australia

Burbong
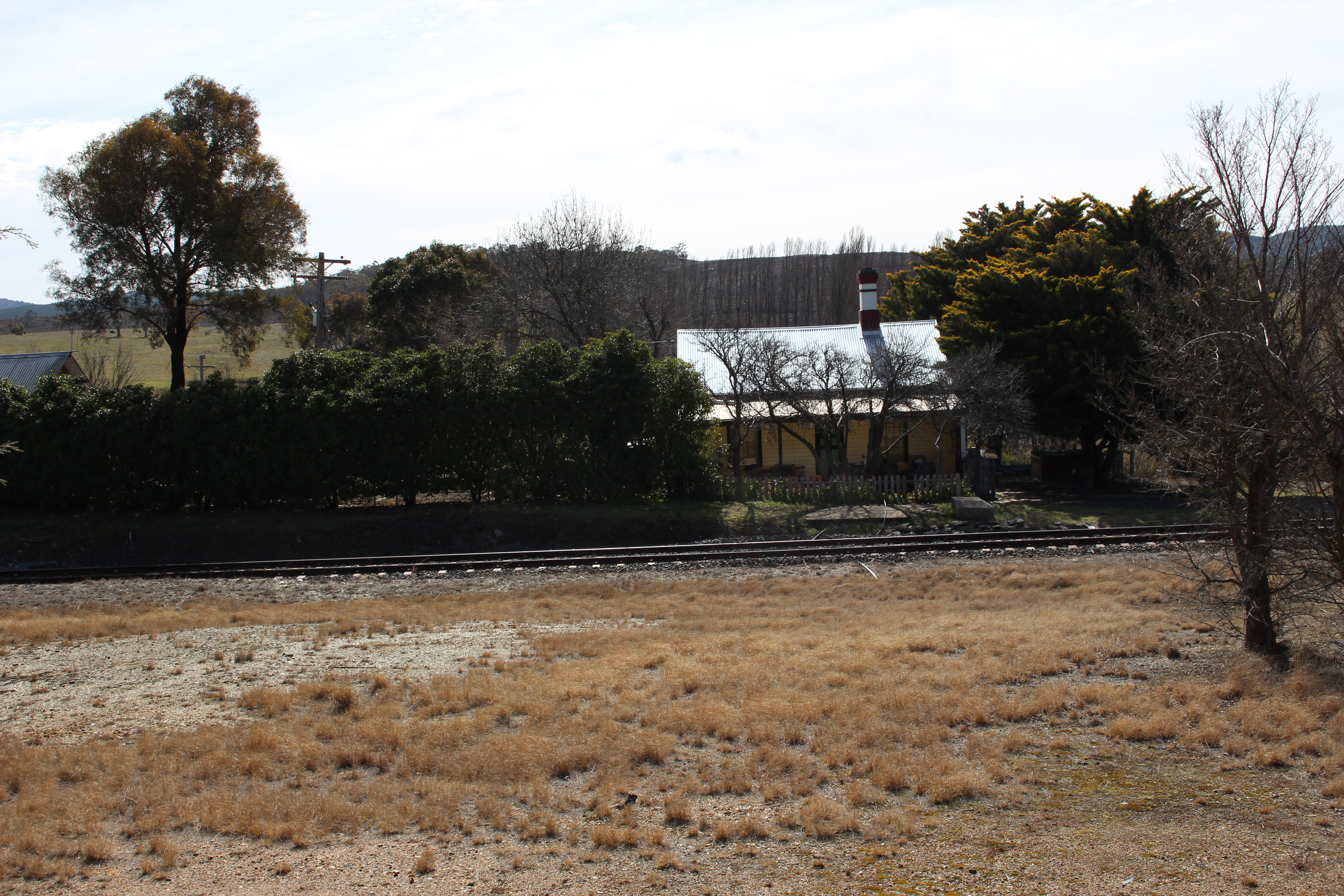
- Burbong station house

General information
- Location: Burbong; Australia
- Coordinates: 35°20′13″S 149°19′01″E
- Lines: Bombala railway line; Canberra railway station branch
- Platforms: 1
- Tracks: 1

Other information
- Status: Closed, partially demolished, repurposed as a home

History
- Opened: 8 September 1887
- Closed: 20 January 1975

Services
Preceding station	Former services	Following station
Queanbeyan towards Bombala	Bombala Line	Bungendore towards Sydney
Location

Burbong is a former railway station that was located on the Bombala railway line, that leaves the Main Southern railway line at Joppa Junction. It served the Burbong and the surrounding area, which is part of the locality of Carwoola to the east of Queanbeyan in the Monaro Region of New South Wales, Australia.

== History ==
The station opened as "Molonglo" on 8 September 1887, being just west of the crossing of the Molonglo River. It was renamed "Burbong" on 1 January 1890. The station was closed on 20 January 1975.

The station building is on the northern side of the railway line, close to the Australian Capital Territory. It is in New South Wales, because the state border runs along the northern edge of the railway land at this point, not along the railway as is sometimes assumed. The boundary was drawn to ensure that all of the Bombala railway remained part of New South Wales.

On 21 March 1979, a woman was killed and her son injured in an accident at the level crossing with the former course of the Kings Highway at Burbong.

== Aboriginal name ==
The name "Burbong" is from the Aboriginal Australian name in the local language for Goulburn.

== Current use ==
The station building still exists, having been redeveloped as a private dwelling. The railway line is used daily for services between Canberra and Sydney. The highway now crosses the line over a bridge.
