= Letchworth railway station, New South Wales =

Former railway station in New South Wales, Australia

Letchworth

General information
- Coordinates: 35°22′10″S 149°11′26″E
- Line: Bombala railway line
- Platforms: 1
- Tracks: 1

Other information
- Status: Closed and demolished

History
- Opened: 22 October 1926
- Closed: 1 May 1956

Services
Preceding station	Former services	Following station
Tuggeranong towards Bombala	Bombala Line	Queanbeyan towards Sydney
Location

Letchworth is a former railway station that was located on the Bombala railway line.

It was named Letchworth, after Letchworth Garden City. The name was suggested by land developer H. F. Halloran. It was located at an unrealised Halloran residential sub-division, also named Letchworth. The station would have also served another of his sub-divisions, Environa, if either of the sub-divisions had been developed.

== External links section ==
- NSW Railnet - Letchworth
