= Cooma Mail =

Australian passenger train

Overview
- Service type: Passenger train
- Status: Ceased
- First service: May 1889
- Last service: 31 May 1986
- Former operator: State Rail Authority

Route
- Termini: Sydney; Cooma
- Distance travelled: 435 kilometres (270 mi)
- Service frequency: Once daily in each direction
- Train numbers: SL12 and SL13
- Lines used: Main South; Bombala

The Cooma Mail was an Australian passenger train that operated from May 1889 until May 1986 between Sydney and Cooma.

== History ==
The Cooma Mail commenced operating following the opening of the line from Michelago to Cooma in May 1889. The service ran overnight departing Sydney at 21:00 arriving in Cooma at 10:30 the following morning.

In 1912, the service was upgraded to run as a passenger train throughout. It had previously operated as a mixed train south of Queanbeyan, and accelerated departing Sydney at 20:25 and arriving at 07:00. In March 1927, a Canberra portion was added.

In June 1981, the Sydney bound services was altered to operate as a daylight service departing Cooma at 08:50. On 31 May 1986, the Cooma Mail was withdrawn.
