= Tarago railway station =

Railway station in New South Wales, Australia

Tarago
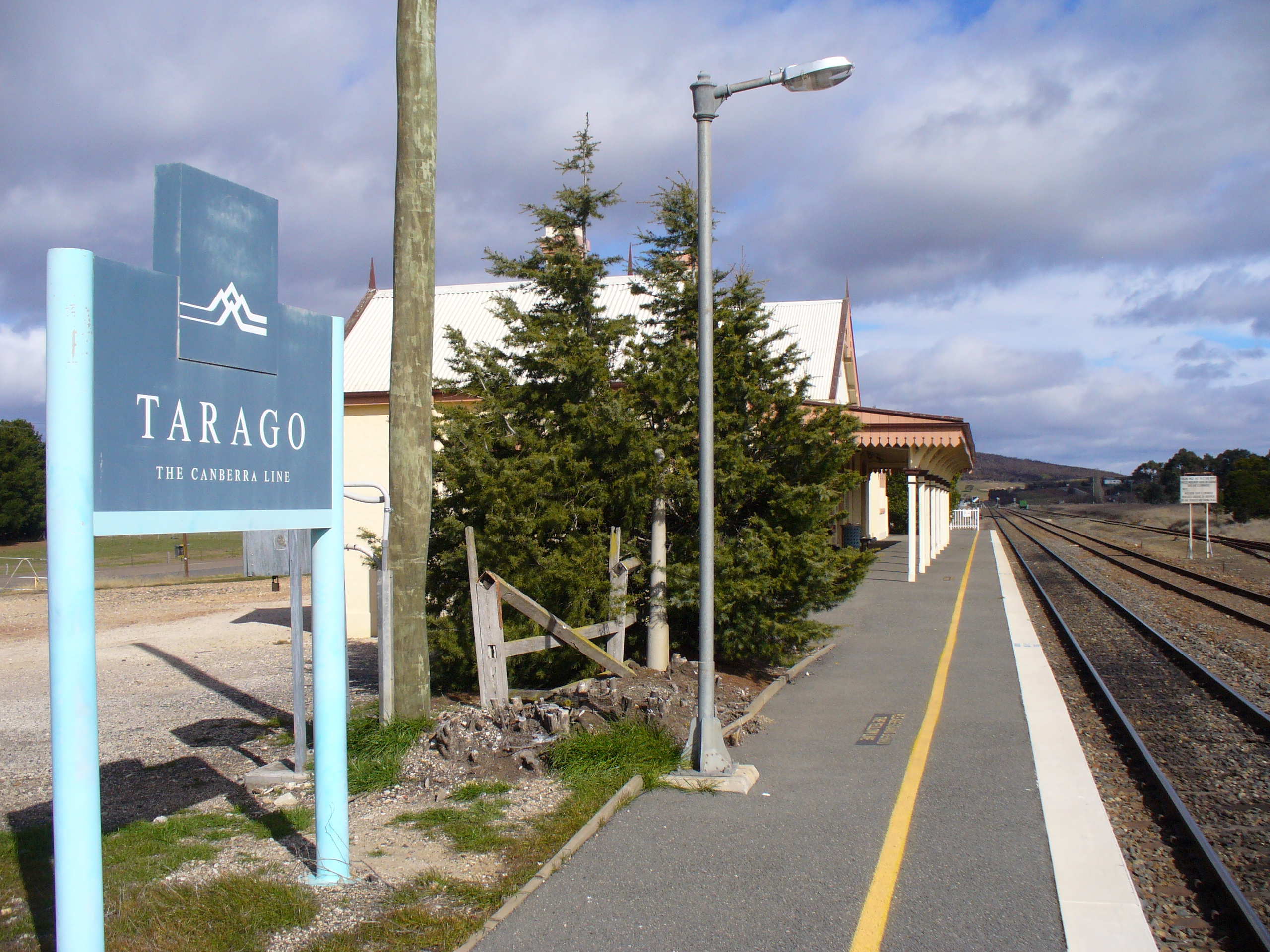
- Southbound view in July 2007

General information
- Location: Tarago Road, Tarago; Australia
- Coordinates: 35°04′12″S 149°39′05″E
- Owner: Transport Asset Manager of New South Wales
- Operator: NSW TrainLink
- Line: Bombala
- Distance: 282.51 kilometres (175.54 mi) from Central
- Platforms: 1
- Tracks: 3

Construction
- Structure type: Ground
- Accessible: Assisted access

Other information
- Station code: TGO

History
- Opened: 3 January 1884

Services
Preceding station	NSW TrainLink	Following station
Bungendore towards Canberra	NSW TrainLink Southern Line Canberra Xplorer	Goulburn towards Sydney
Location

Tarago railway station is a heritage-listed railway station located on the Bombala line in New South Wales, Australia. It serves the town of Tarago. It was built in 1884 by G. & C. Horn. It was added to the New South Wales State Heritage Register on 2 April 1999.

== History ==
Tarago station opened on 3 January 1884 when the Bombala line was opened as a single line from Joppa Junction. It served as the terminus until the line was extended to Bungendore on 4 March 1885. The construction contract for the Joppa Junction to Bungendore section was awarded to W S Topham & J Angus (tramway contractors) on 3 October 1882.

The contract for construction of a station building, Station Master's residence, and goods shed is recorded as being let to G. & C. Horn on 17 December 1883 and Tarago as being officially opened on 3 January 1884. The exact date that the station building and other original buildings were completed is unclear, but it is likely that it was much later than the official opening of January 1884 - either that or the construction of the station buildings began earlier than December 1883. The 83.8 metre long platform, station building, goods shed, and sidings were constructed on the Down (east) side, with the trucking yards situated on the Up side.

The building at Tarago is a five-room example of a standard roadside station. This size of structure was allocated usually to urban areas with excess of 3,000 residents. The Tarago building, as well as those at Bungendore and Queanbeyan, reflect either large urban populations or, more likely, very powerful or influential residents in the region exercising strong political pressure on governments.

Major additions and changes at Tarago included alterations to the loop siding for conversion to a siding to service cattle yards (1891), provision of a cart weighbridge (1893), postal services accommodation constructed (1899), erection of a gantry crane and platform asphalt (1902), conversion of the stockyard siding into a loop (1911), improvements to stockyards (1914), additional siding accommodation at stockyards (1920), rest house transferred from Dunedoo re-erected at Tarago, kitchen and toilet added (1925), trucking yards modified (1940), and the stockyards removed in 1989.

Tarago was closed to goods traffic in c. 1989 but remains a stopover for passenger trains on the Canberra to Sydney XPT service. The station buildings have since undergone some minor repair and conservation works (c. 1994).

The Station Master's residence is to the north of the station, and is now privately owned.

== Services ==
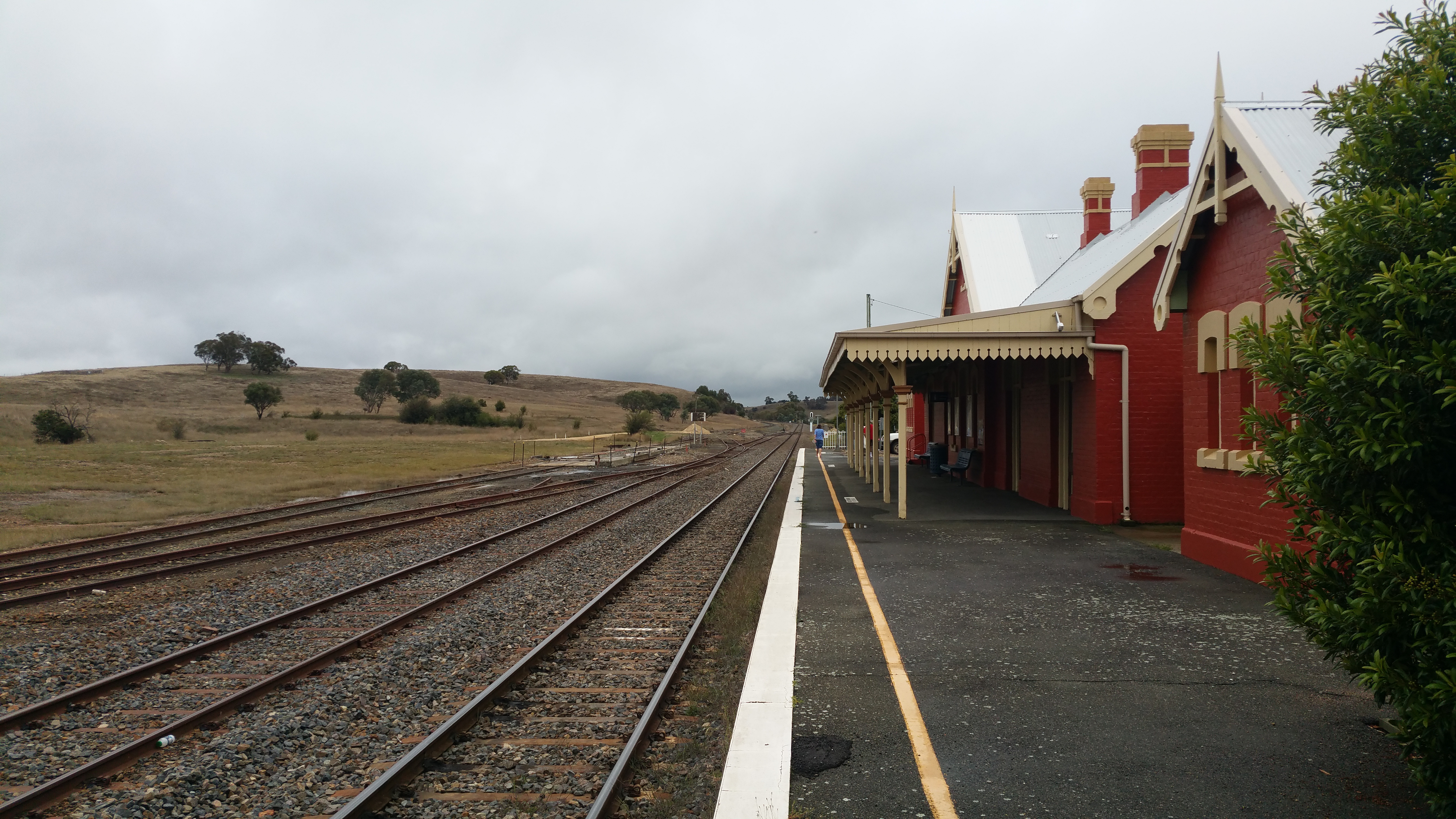
Northbound view on platform

Tarago is served by three daily NSW TrainLink Xplorer services in each direction operating between Sydney and Canberra. This station is a request stop, so the train stops only if passengers booked to board/alight here.

Platform	Line	Stopping pattern	Notes
1	Southern Region	services to Sydney Central & Canberra	request stop (booked passengers only)

== Description ==
The heritage-listed station complex consists of a type 4 standard roadside third class brick station building and platform, constructed in 1884, a type Q non-elevated fibro signal box constructed in 1938, and a type 3 goods shed constructed in 1884. Opposite the platform lies a passing loop and a siding to the closed Woodlawn Mine.

Station Building (1884)

The building is simply planned with central waiting room flanked by SM office and ticket office with parcels at one end of the building and ladies waiting at the other. The station buildings are constructed of brick with a painted finish and feature gabled roofs clad in corrugated iron with corbelled brick chimneys. The central building features a rear porch entry to the central room which is marked by a transverse gable. Gable ends feature decorative timber barge boards and timber finials. The platform verandah has a decorative timber valance and is supported on timber posts with curved iron brackets. Timber sash windows have moulded surrounds and sills.

The brick platform also dates from 1884. The asphalt surface is modern.

Signal Box (1938)

The signal box is a simple square structure with a hipped roof clad in corrugated iron and timber framed walls clad in fibro.

Goods shed (1884)

The goods shed is a large rectangular structure with a gabled roof clad in corrugated iron extending to form awnings on either side of the building. The awnings are supported on timber brackets. The building is timber framed with corrugated iron wall cladding. A small weatherboard office wing is clad in weatherboard. The structure features a large timber platform and timber sliding doors with diagonal boarding.

The station group was reported to be in a generally good condition as at 19 July 2013.

The station group including the station building, platforms, goods shed and signal box have a high level of integrity. The platform buildings and goods shed are largely intact. The Woodlawn mine loader is intrusive on the heritage precinct.

== Heritage listing ==
Tarago Railway Precinct is of state significance as a significant Victorian period railway precinct that retains several original or early items from the 1880s including the 1884 roadside station building and the c. 1884 goods shed. The extant railway buildings and structures form an important landmark for the small town at Tarago and are important elements within the wider townscape. The station building and goods shed are good representative examples of a series of similar items located on the Main Southern Line and on the Bombala Line.

Tarago railway station was listed on the New South Wales State Heritage Register on 2 April 1999 having satisfied the following criteria.

The place is important in demonstrating the course, or pattern, of cultural or natural history in New South Wales.

The site has historic significance through its ability to demonstrate the late 19th Century development of the NSW railways. The site includes several items dating from the opening of the line at Tarago in 1884 and demonstrates the layout of a late 19th Century railway precinct.

The place is important in demonstrating aesthetic characteristics and/or a high degree of creative or technical achievement in New South Wales.

The site has aesthetic significance as a railway precinct that retains several original items that demonstrate railway design in the 1880s. The 1884 station building is a fine example of a Victorian third class roadside station building with fabric and fine detailing typical of the period. The railway buildings, structures and the site are important elements within the wider townscape of Tarago.

The place has strong or special association with a particular community or cultural group in New South Wales for social, cultural or spiritual reasons.

The site is of social significance to the local community on account of its lengthy association for providing an important source of employment, trade and social interaction for the local area. The site is significant for its ability to contribute to the local community's sense of place, is a distinctive feature of the daily life of many community members, and provides a connection to the local community's past.

The place is important in demonstrating the principal characteristics of a class of cultural or natural places/environments in New South Wales.

The station building has representative significance as a fine example of a third class, brick standard roadside station building, similar in design to station buildings at Bungendore, Michelago and other locations in NSW. The goods shed is also a good representative example of a standard late 19th century goods shed. The collection of buildings demonstrate widespread late 19th and early 20th Century railway customs, activities and design in NSW and are representative of similar items that are found at other railway sites across the state.
