= Proposed Canberra-Yass railway =

Railway line in Australia

The Canberra-Yass railway is a proposed 64-kilometre (40 mi) link between the centre of Canberra and the Sydney-Melbourne rail line at Yass Junction, via Yass town.

The project was first cited in the Seat of Government Acceptance Act 1909, the legislation that established the Federal Capital Territory (now Australian Capital Territory). The route, economic viability and modality have been subject to debate and review for over 110 years without resolution.

More recent proposals have included a rail link between Canberra and Yass as part of a Sydney/Melbourne high-speed railway, though others link Canberra via a spur line.

In 2016, a representative from Yass Council outlined a proposal for a light rail link from Canberra to Yass via Belconnen, following the announcement of future plans to connect Belconnen to Canberra's light rail network.

== History ==
In 1916, representatives from 37 municipalities spanning the entire area from Albury to Wollongong called for the immediate construction of a railway from Yass to Jervis Bay via Canberra. By 1933, the railway was still subject to parliamentary debate, when it was announced by the Minister for the Interior that the proposal, which would 'considerably shorten the rail journey between Canberra and Melbourne', would not be carried out without full Parliamentary approval. The project had been proposed as a solution to unemployment in Canberra.

In 1945, The Ministry of Post-War Reconstruction in a preliminary report on a plan for the development of the Australian Capital Territory found that 'communication between Canberra and Yass is very circuitous'; and that a permanent survey was made by the NSW railway department for a route generally following the existing main roads.

In 1966, surveyors for the Commonwealth Railways pegged out proposed route with yellow wooden stakes. The route to the east of Canberra was planned to pass through Pialligo, cutting through at least eight properties home to vegetable growers.

In 1971, the Minister for Shipping and Transport published an economic report on the Yass-Canberra Rail Link, which found a benefit/cost ratio would be at best 0.82 and therefore not economically justified.

== Proposed routes ==
Three proposed routes for the Canberra-Yass rail link have been outlined since the 1909 declaration that the railway align with the 'main road route'. The first being one running parallel to the east of Northbourne Avenue as outlined in Walter Burley Griffin's original design for the city. A railway was constructed from the present-day Canberra station in Kingston, crossing the Molonglo River to the City Centre - which would have continued north through what is now the suburbs of Braddon and Dickson before veering north-west through what is present day Lyneham to follow the original Queanbeyan-Yass road (now the Barton Highway). The Molonglo railway bridge was destroyed by floods in 1922, with all railway tracked removed by the 1940s.

The second route, proposed by the Commonwealth Railways Commissioner in 1965, ran much further to the east of the city through Majura. The proposed route, surveyed by the Department of Shipping and Transport, bypassed the existing railway station at Kingston entirely, joining the existing railway to the east of Causeway. A new major passenger terminal was proposed to be built next to Woolshed Creek on Majura Rd. A number of high-speed rail proposals connecting Sydney to Melbourne via Canberra have included a similar route.

The third, unstudied route involves a light railway from Belconnen, northwest to Yass.

No substantive studies have been carried out on the most direct route, running west from Canberra City, south of Black Mountain, following William Hovel Drive. However, a light railway corridor running west of the city is included in current light rail planning.

== Location of Canberra railway station ==
All proposed routes for a Canberra-Yass rail link have noted the current location of Canberra's main station at Kingston as a barrier. Indeed, the original plan for Canberra was to have a main passenger railway station in what is now Russell.

In 2013, a report released by the federal Labor Government proposed a new underground railway terminal under Ainslie Avenue at Cooyong Street - with tracks running north through a 4-kilometre (2.5 mi) tunnel under Mount Ainslie.

In anticipation of a future high-speed railway, in 2017 the ACT Government reserved rail corridors along the Ainslie Avenue route and a second route option serving Canberra Airport. These routes and station locations support Canberra being on a spur line running south from the main Sydney-Melbourne railway. Depending on the route of this spur line, the rail distance between Canberra and Yass could be between 89-kilometre (55 mi) and 130-kilometre (81 mi).
