= Bungendore railway station =

Railway station in New South Wales, Australia

Bungendore
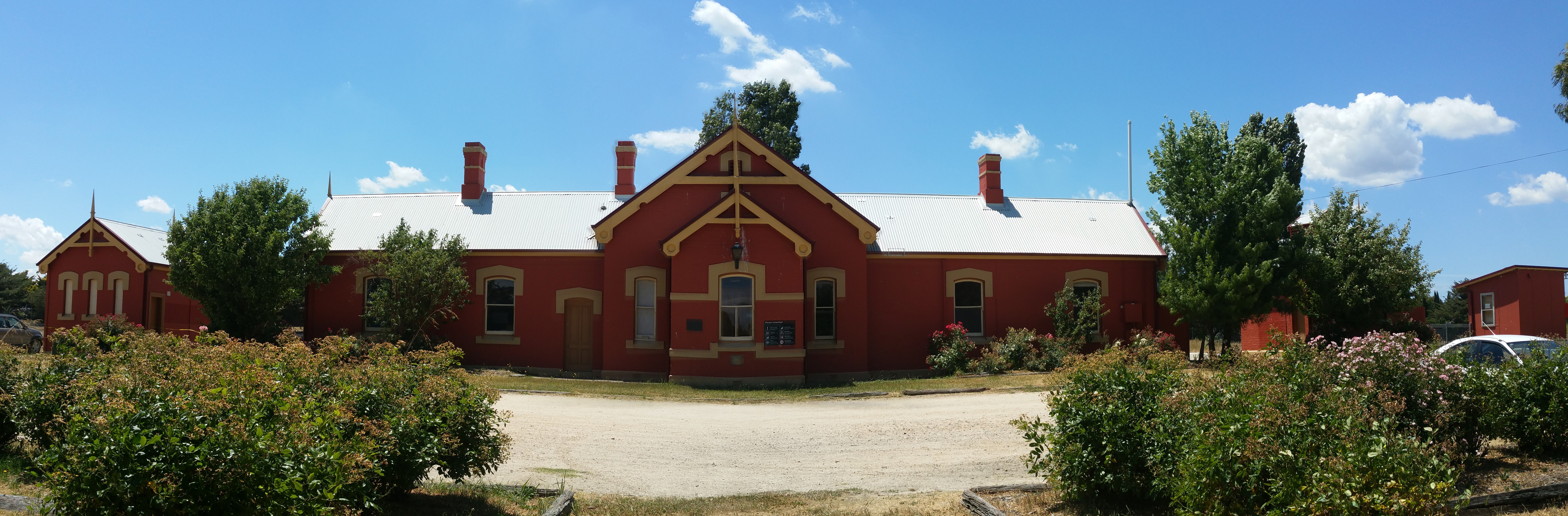
- Station building in December 2015

General information
- Location: Majara Street, Bungendore; Australia
- Coordinates: 35°15′21″S 149°26′47″E
- Owner: Transport Asset Manager of New South Wales
- Operator: NSW TrainLink
- Line: Bombala
- Distance: 293.50 kilometres (182.37 mi) from Central
- Platforms: 1
- Tracks: 2

Construction
- Structure type: Ground
- Accessible: Yes

Other information
- Station code: BUX

History
- Opened: 4 March 1885

Services
Preceding station	NSW TrainLink	Following station
Queanbeyan towards Canberra	NSW TrainLink Southern Line Canberra Xplorer	Tarago towards Sydney
Location

Bungendore railway station is a heritage-listed railway station located on the Bombala line in New South Wales, Australia. It serves the town of Bungendore. The design of the station has been attributed to John Whitton. It was built in 1884–85 by contractor J. Jordan. It was added to the New South Wales State Heritage Register on 2 April 1999.

== History ==
Bungendore station opened on 4 March 1885 when the Bombala line was extended from Tarago. It served as the terminus until the line was extended to Queanbeyan on 8 September 1887. There is a passing loop opposite the platform.

Construction of the station building, station master's residence, goods shed, and gatekeeper's residences was let to a J. Jordan on 6 September 1884. It is likely that the goods shed, gatekeeper's residence, and station master's residence were all completed c. 1885.

The station building at Bungendore is a five-room example of a standard roadside third-class station designed by the Engineer-in-Chief of the NSW Railways, John Whitton. Station buildings of this size were usually allocated to urban areas in excess of 3,000 residents. The Bungendore building, as well as those at Tarago and Queanbeyan, reflect either a large urban population or, more likely, very powerful or influential residents exercising strong political pressure on the NSW government.

Major additions and changes to the railway precinct/yard at Bungendore included the installation of a 12-ton cart weighbridge in 1891 (removed at an unknown date), a carriage shelter shed/engine shed in 1902 (relocated to Coffs Harbour in 1918), and loading bank in 1909. The station yard was interlocked in April 1917. The nearby stockyards were constructed in 1887, modified in 1913, and ceased to be used in 1989.

On 17 June 1940, Bungendore became a junction station when the Captains Flat line opened, branching from the Bombala line five kilometres south of the station.

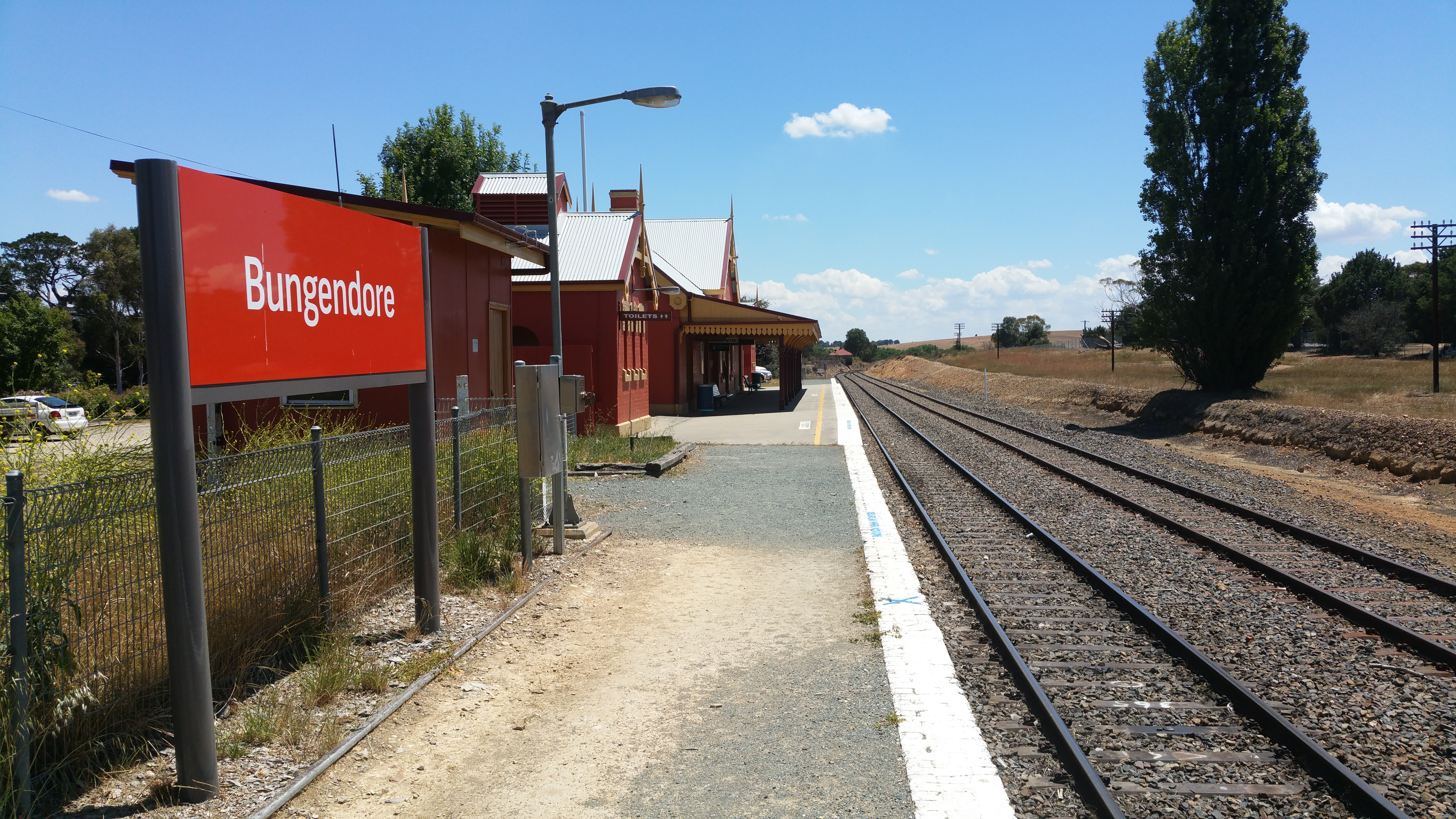
Northbound view on the platform

The southern fork of the triangle at Bungendore, as part of the line to Captains Flat, was removed in 1972 and the precinct ceased to be used for goods traffic in 1989. However, Bungendore remains an operational passenger station for Countrylink services between Sydney and Canberra.

A station master's residence and gatekeeper's residence are still extant to the north of the station building, but are no longer in railway ownership.

Bungendore station was used in the filming of The Year My Voice Broke and the Mick Jagger version of Ned Kelly.

== Services ==
Bungendore is served by three daily NSW TrainLink Xplorer services in each direction operating between Sydney and Canberra. This station is a request stop for trains heading to Canberra, so the train stops only if passengers booked to board/alight here.

Platform	Line	Stopping pattern	Notes
1	Southern Region	services to Sydney Central & Canberra	request stop, in the direction to Canberra (booked passengers only)

== Description ==
The heritage-listed station complex includes the type 4, standard roadside third-class brick station building (1885), the type G, skillion roofed timber signal box (1917), platform, type 3 corrugated iron goods shed (1884), corrugated iron per way trolley shed and a 5 tonne metal jib crane (T431).

Station Building (1885)

The station buildings present as a symmetrical layout and elevation, with a central waiting room with two single storey structures to either side, one containing men's and women's toilets, the other the lamp room. Originally these were connected to the main building with small pavilions with yards for staff use, now removed. The building is simply planned with central waiting room flanked by the SM's office and ticket office with parcels at one end of the building and ladies waiting room at the other.

The station buildings are constructed of brick with a painted finish and feature gabled roofs clad in corrugated iron with corbelled brick chimneys. The central building features a rear porch entry to the central room which is marked by a transverse gable. Gable ends feature decorative timber barge boards and timber finials. The platform verandah has a decorative timber valance and is supported on timber posts with curved iron brackets. Timber sash windows have moulded surrounds and sills.

Signal Box (1917)

The signal box is a simple square structure with a skillion roof clad in corrugated iron and timber framed walls clad in fibro. Some signalling equipment is still evident.

Goods Shed (1884)

The goods shed is a large rectangular structure with a gabled roof clad in corrugated iron extending to form awnings on either side of the building. The awnings are supported on timber brackets. The building is timber framed with corrugated iron wall cladding. A small office wing is clad in weatherboard. The structure features a large timber platform and timber sliding doors with diagonal boarding. The goods shed features a metal fence, advertising signs, sign with distances to Queanbeyan and Goulburn on exterior wall of office, two doors to each side of goods shed and standard horizontal timber bracing.

Platform

Brick platform face with asphalt platform surface.

The station group including the station buildings, platforms, goods shed, per way trolley shed, jib crane and signal box have a high level of integrity.

== Heritage listing ==
Bungendore Railway Precinct comprises a state significant late nineteenth century railway station and partly intact yard, including the 1885 roadside station building, the 1885 goods shed and jib crane. The extant railway buildings and structures at Bungendore, particularly the station building and goods shed, are important elements within the wider townscape of Bungendore and are good representative examples of a series of similar items located on the Main Southern Line and the Bombala Line.

Bungendore railway station was listed on the New South Wales State Heritage Register on 2 April 1999 having satisfied the following criteria.

The place is important in demonstrating the course, or pattern, of cultural or natural history in New South Wales.

The place demonstrates late 19th century practices and designs implemented by the NSW railways. The place includes several structures dating from the opening of the line at Bungendore in 1885 and demonstrates the layout of a typical late 19th century railway station and yard.

The place is important in demonstrating aesthetic characteristics and/or a high degree of creative or technical achievement in New South Wales.

The site has aesthetic significance as a railway precinct that retains several original items that demonstrate railway design in the 1880s. The 1885 station building is a fine example of a Victorian third class roadside station building with fabric and fine detailing typical of the period. The railway buildings and structures at Bungendore are important elements within the wider townscape of Bungendore.

The place has strong or special association with a particular community or cultural group in New South Wales for social, cultural or spiritual reasons.

The site is of social significance to the local community on account of its lengthy association for providing an important source of employment, trade and social interaction for the local area. The site is significant for its ability to contribute to the local community's sense of place, is a distinctive feature of the daily life of many community members, and provides a connection to the local community's past.

The place is important in demonstrating the principal characteristics of a class of cultural or natural places/environments in New South Wales.

The station building has representative significance as a fine example of a third class, brick standard roadside station building, similar in design to station buildings at Tarago, Michelago and other locations in NSW. The goods shed is also a good representative example of a standard late 19th century goods shed with extended platform and an attached jib crane. The collection of buildings at Bungendore demonstrates widespread late 19th and early 20th century railway customs, activities and design in NSW and are representative of similar items that are found in many other railway precincts across the state.
