= Bombala railway line =

Railway line in Australia

Bombala Line
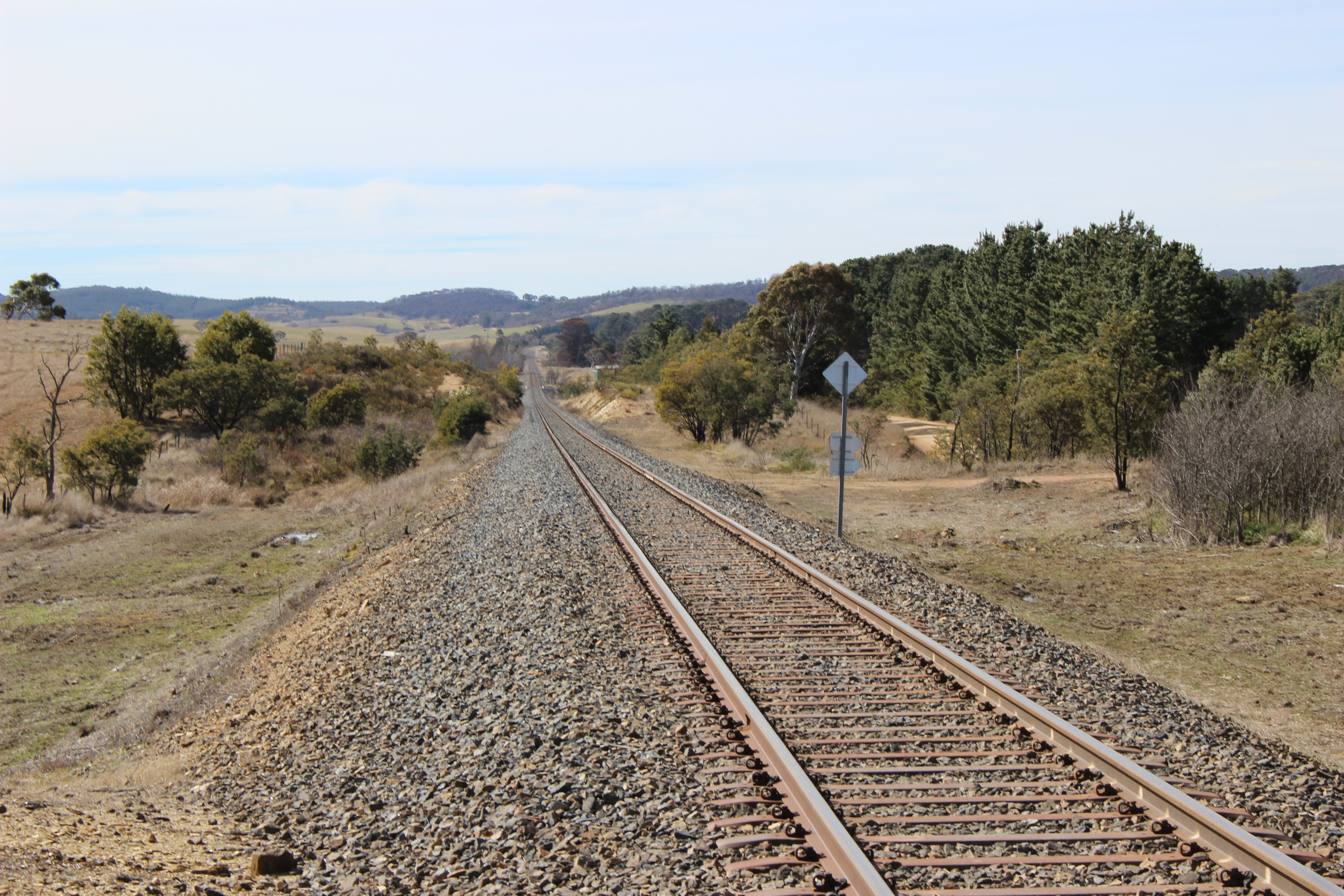
- Bombala railway at Mount Fairy

Overview
- Owner: Transport Asset Manager of New South Wales
- Termini: Joppa Junction; Canberra

Service
- Operator: UGL Regional Linx (to Canberra)

History
- Closed: 29 March 1986 (past Cooma) 28 May 1989 (past Queanbeyan)

Technical
- Line length: 109 km (68 mi)
- Track gauge: 1,435 mm (4 ft 8 1/2 in)

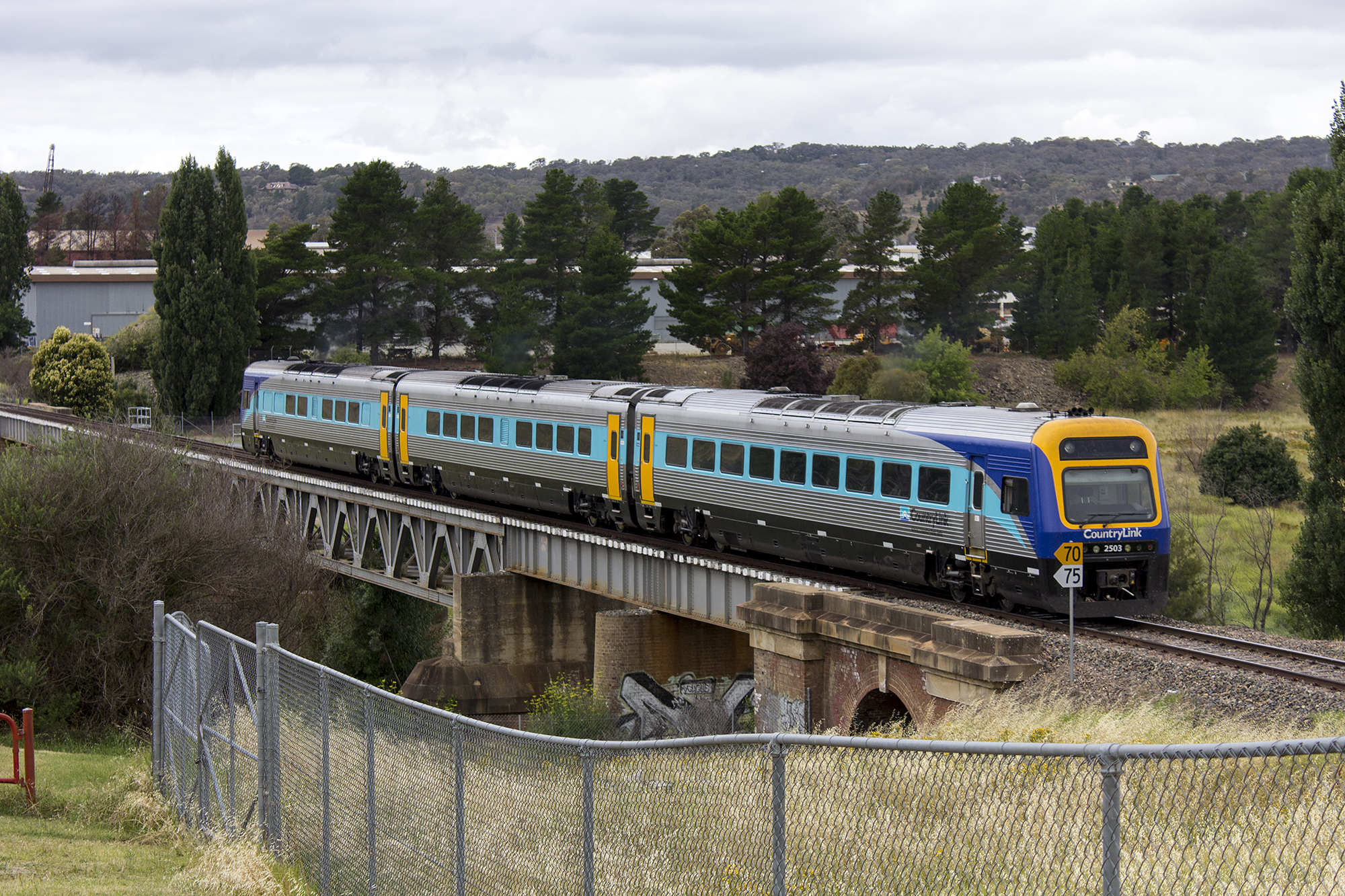
An Xplorer crosses the Queanbeyan River headed for Canberra station

The Bombala railway line is a branch railway line in the south of New South Wales, Australia. The northern part of it forms part of the main line from Sydney to Canberra, but the southern part is closed. It branches off the Main South line at Joppa Junction, south of Goulburn. The line is used by NSW TrainLink Xplorer services running between Sydney Central and Canberra station.

== History ==
=== Construction ===
The line was opened in stages to Tarago (3 January 1884), Bungendore (4 March 1885), Queanbeyan (8 September 1887), Michelago (7 December 1887), Cooma (31 May 1889), Nimmitabel (20 April 1912) and Bombala (21 November 1921).

==== Queanbeyan ====
The section of the line between Bungendore and Queanbeyan was the most challenging to construct, with three tunnels, a major sideling embankment along the Molonglo River gorge (also known as 'Pine Valley'), and two major bridges, across the Molonglo and Queanbeyan Rivers.

The construction contract for the line from Bungendore to Michelago was awarded to Johnstone and Co., on 27 May 1884. They used 1,700 men on this section, with another 100 working around Tomakin to cut and saw timber.

Queanbeyan station opened on 8 September 1887, with work already well advanced on the extension to Michelago.

==== Michelago ====
Michelago station opened on Wednesday, 7 December 1887. On the previous day, The Sydney Morning Herald published a detailed description of the engineering works done between Queanbeyan and Michelago.

==== Cooma ====
The contract for the Michelago to Cooma section was awarded to Walker & Swan on 18 August 1885. Cooma station opened on 31 May 1889.

During construction of the railway from Michelago to Cooma, much of the major works in this section—four bridges, a tunnel and some cuttings and high embankments—lay between Michelego station and the far side of the Bredbo River. There was also a major bridge over the Numeralla River, The construction contractor had 600 men working on the line and living in tents.

==== Canberra branch ====
During the process of determining the site of the new national capital, consideration was given to extending the line to Bombala, Dalgety, and Delegate—all proposed national capital sites—with potential further extensions to the port of Eden and to reach the Victorian border to link to complementary extensions of the Victorian Railways. The later extension to Bombala was not related to the national capital selection.

After Canberra was selected as the capital, work began in 1913, on a short line to connect the new capital to then existing Cooma railway, at Queanbeyan.

The Cooma railway line, as it was known at the time, is nominated in the description of the Australian Capital Territory in the Second Schedule of the Seat of Government Acceptance Act 1909. Although the railway lies entirely within New South Wales, from Brooks Bank Tunnel north of Burbong to the locality known as 'The Angle' (just south of the small settlement of Williamsdale), the western boundary of its corridor forms the border with the Australian Capital Territory.

==== Nimmitabel and Bombala ====
The line between Cooma and Nimmitabel opened in April 1912. Work on the line beyond Nimmitabel was suspended, due to lack of funds during the First World War. The extension of the railway to Bombala opened in November 1921.

=== Closure of the southern end of the line ===
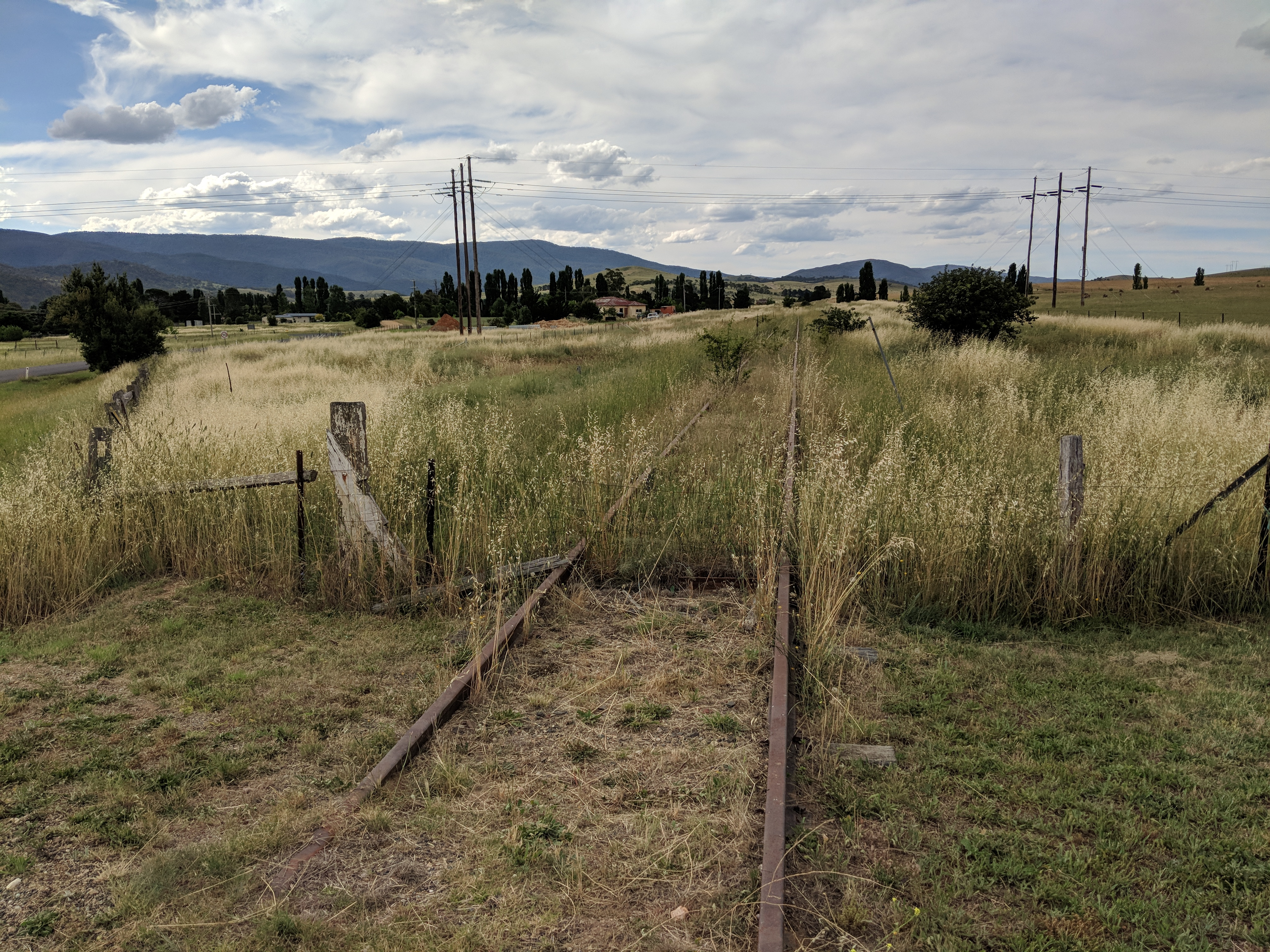
The Bombala line at Bredbo

On 26 March 1986, the line south of Cooma was closed.

Passenger services south of Queanbeyan ceased in September 1988. A bridge carrying the line over the Numeralla River at Chakola was declared unsafe so freight services south of Queanbeyan ceased in May 1989. However a special steam train service did operate through to Cooma a few weeks later, albeit without passengers over the bridge in question.

=== Attempts to reopen ===
The 49 kilometre section between Queanbeyan and Michelago was re-opened in April 1993 for heritage tourist operation by the ACT Division of the Australian Railway Historical Society. The line available for traffic was truncated to Royalla as it deteriorated, until finally being suspended at the beginning of 2007 as a result of storm damage.

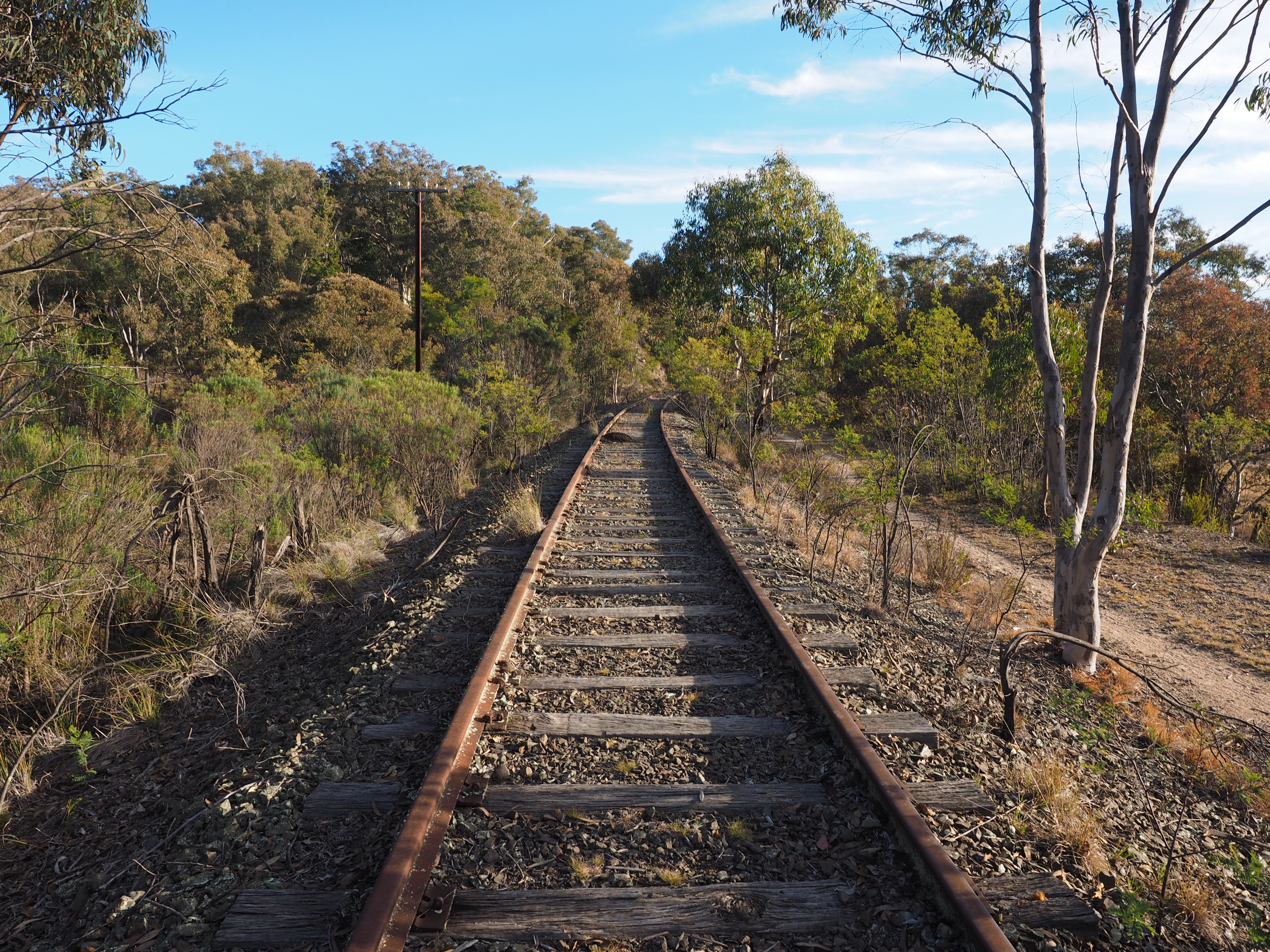
An abandoned section of the Bombala railway line near Canberra in 2026

To reopen the line, substantial sleeper replacement would be required, approximately 16,000 pieces. In addition, one major timber bridge, at Jerrabomberra Creek, would need to be replaced, and some other minor bridgework and other works undertaken. The ARHS was investigating a large pile of steel sleepers that would probably have been sufficient that were lying unused along the northern line. However recovery work plan was never completed by the ARHS. The ARHS formally relinquished its lease on the Queanbeyan to Michelago section of track in 2011, and has subsequently concentrated its activities to boutique novelty trips for Canberra's population on the Canberra to Bungendore section of the line.

In October 1999 Freight Australia commenced operating log trains a couple of kilometres south of Queanbeyan to Hume.

In 1992, the Cooma Monaro Railway was formed, with the initial goal of restoring Cooma Railway Station. After the group had restored the station, efforts were then made by the group to acquire rolling stock and re-open a section of track. This came to fruition starting in 1998, with over 17 kilometres (11 mi) of railway track reopened and restored CPH railmotors operated between Cooma and Chakola. Train movements were suspended on this section of track in January 2014 while the CMR worked toward compliance with the requirements of Rail Safety National Law.

In 2013, a railway museum was created at the Bombala terminus, with a view to increasing local tourism. A tourist train service was not proposed, with vast tracts of rail missing between Bombala and the preceding station at Bukalong siding.

== Services ==
The line between Joppa Junction Goulburn and Queanbeyan remains open, and is served by three daily NSW TrainLink Xplorer services in each direction operating between Sydney and Canberra. A stop block at Queanbeyan, at 321.72 km (199.91 mi), clear of Frame F crossover, marks the current operational end of the Bombala line.

The majority of freight traffic on the line are refuse trains for the Woodlawn Bioreactor at Tarago. Fuel trains ran to Canberra until January 2009. From 6 March 2015, a joint venture between Espee Railroad Services (a commercial operation set up by the Canberra Railway Museum) and local company Access Recycling began operating weekly freight trains loaded with scrap metal from Canberra to Port Botany via the Canberra branch and Bombala line. However, in November 2016 Espee and the museum ceased operations following safety issues with the loading site in Canberra and a general downturn in the rail industry.

== Future ==
=== Possibility of reopening Queanbeyan–Cooma section ===
The section of track between Michelago and Chakola remains an obstacle for the reopening of the line between Queanbeyan and Cooma. Realignment of the Monaro Highway has in a few cases encroached on the rail line reservation and the rail bridge over the Numeralla River would need to be replaced to meet modern standards. Hope has been raised a number of times for the full reopening of the section of rail between Queanbeyan and Cooma. In recent times, mining operations have commenced near Cooma.

The future of the far section of line from Cooma to Bombala seems less certain. Originally designed for the area's farmers to move their cattle, sheep and produce, this section seems to have fallen victim to the modern age. Early last century, the builders of the Cooma to Bombala line hoped that some continuity would eventually follow, with future rail construction and services from Bombala continuing down south across the Victorian border. This is evidenced by the main line and perway at Bombala continuing some distance past the station. This joining up with the Victorian Railways network never eventuated, despite Victoria having a rail line 100 km (62 mi) away at Orbost until 1987.

A NSW government feasibility study, completed in 2020 at a cost of $1m, examined the re-opening the Canberra to Bombala rail line, as well as the extension of the line to the Port of Eden, concluding that it was not viable due to high costs and low returns, with a benefit-cost ratio of 0.1.

Further damage was done to the line during the bushfire season of 2019-2020, with some wooden sleepers being burned out along the line between Colinton and Bredbo. The road from Burra to Michelago had always crossed the line through an underpass just north of Michelago station. However the underpass has now been removed and replaced by a break in the embankment. There are a number of large timber bridges, as well as smaller timber culverts, on the line between Michelago and Cooma. Local residents saved the bridge across Michelago Creek from a planned demolition, in late 2016. However, after over three decades, without significant maintenance work, the bridges are inevitably deteriorating in condition, as time passes. Photographs from April 2024 showed the Bombala Railway Precinct to be in reasonable condition including the station buildings.

=== Provision of local services ===
There have been calls for the line to be used for local services from Canberra through Queanbeyan to Bungendore.

=== Monaro rail trail proposal ===
A rail trail has been proposed for the line, between Queanbeyan and Bombala, as a means to preserve and make use of the rail corridor and its remaining heritage features, although that could conflict with any plans to reopen the tourist railway near Cooma. In August 2022, the NSW Parliament passed Transport Administration Amendment (Rail Trails) Bill 2022, which has the objective of facilitating the use of disused railway lines as rail trails, and specifically allows the removal of railway tracks and other works for that purpose. In December 2022, $273,000 was provided, by the NSW Government, to complete the Development Plan for the rail trail between Queanbeyan and Cooma.

== En Route ==
The disused line south of Cooma is extensively featured within a 30-minute piece of digital art entitled "En Route" by Sue Healey. The disused station at Jincumbilly is the most clearly identifiable section used. This was shown in 2017 on Wynscreen, a 23 m (75 ft)-long video screen constructed as part of the Wynyard Walk project.

== Gallery ==
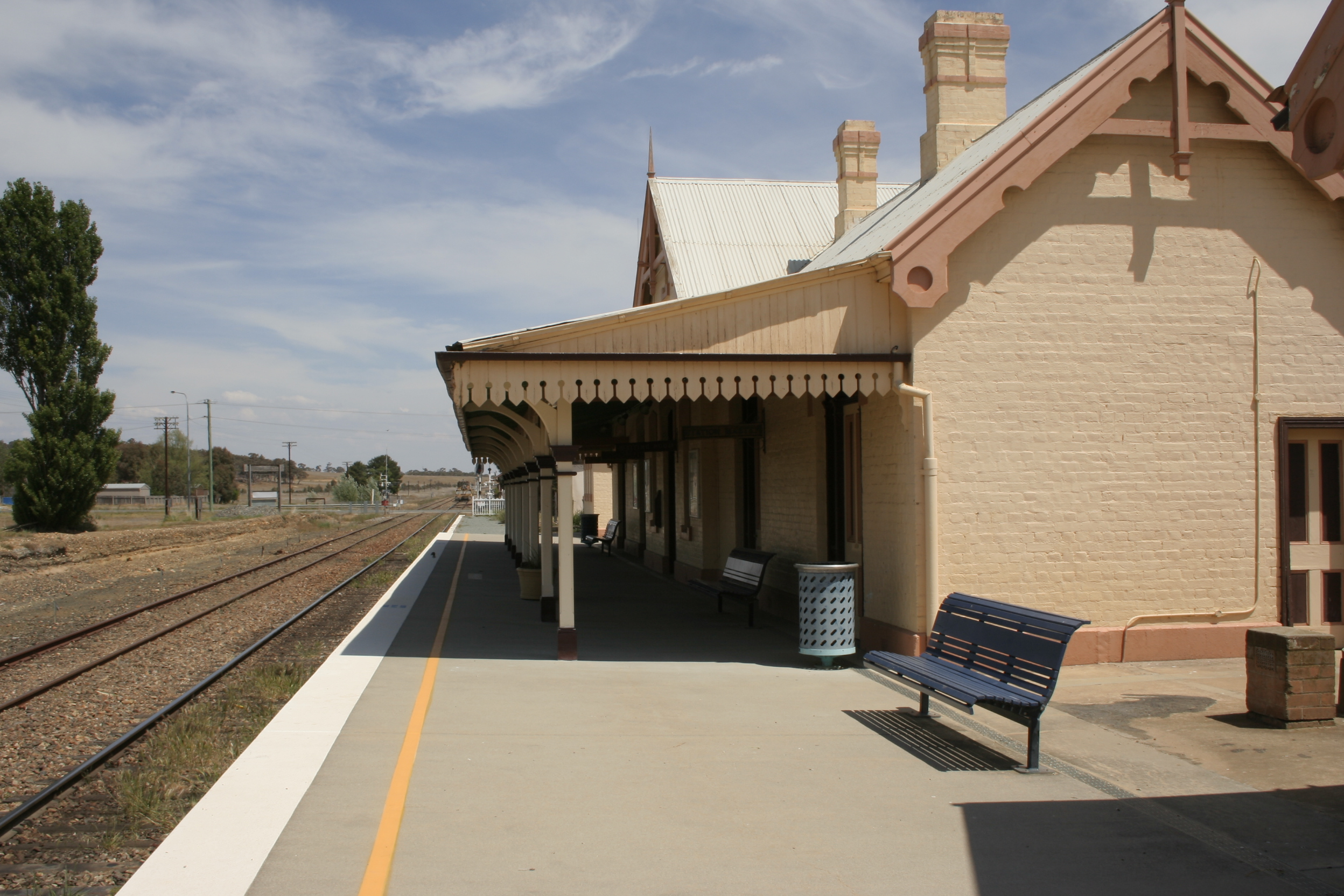
Bungendore railway station, used in the filming of The Year My Voice Broke and the Mick Jagger version of Ned Kelly

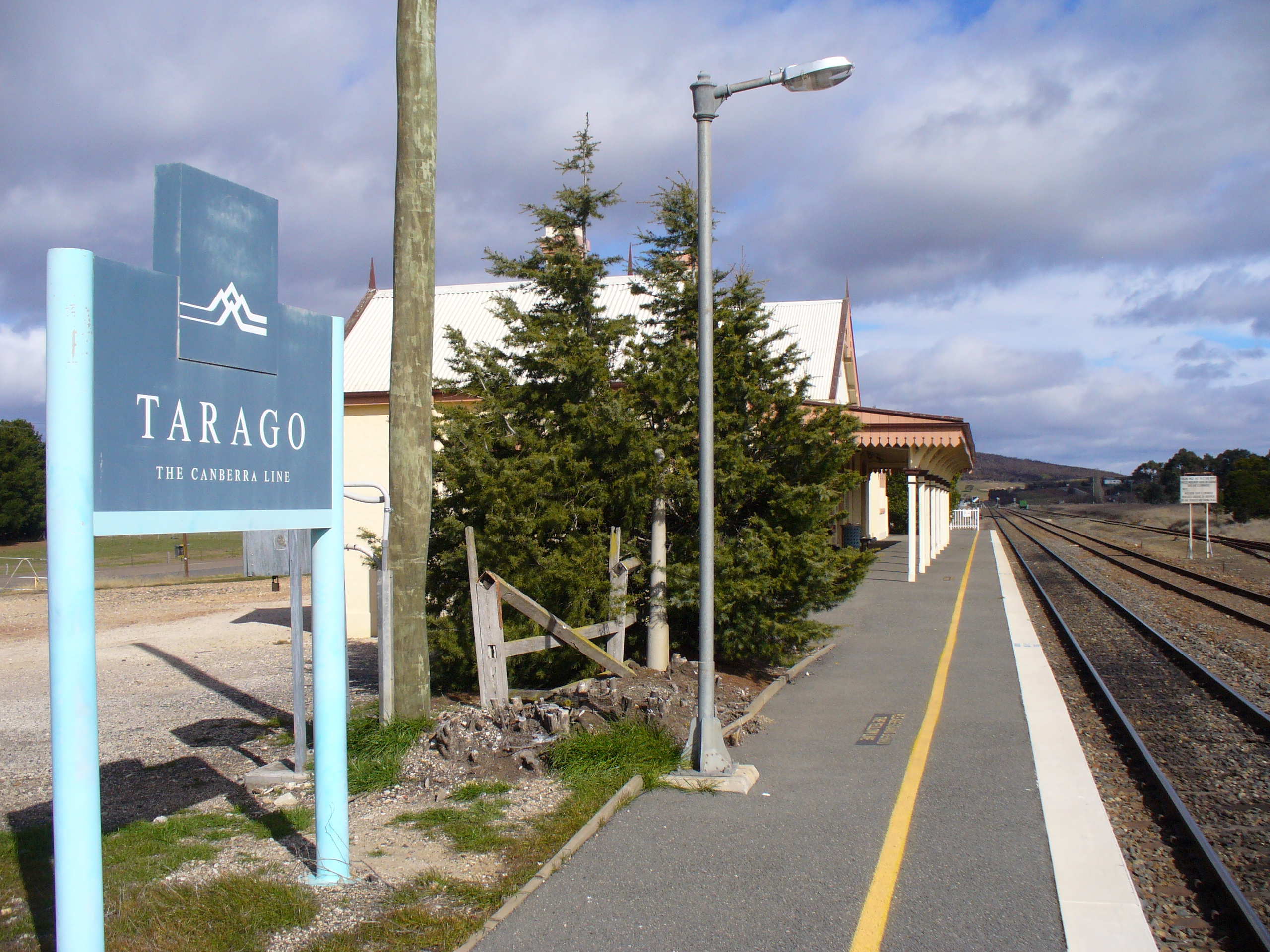
Tarago railway station

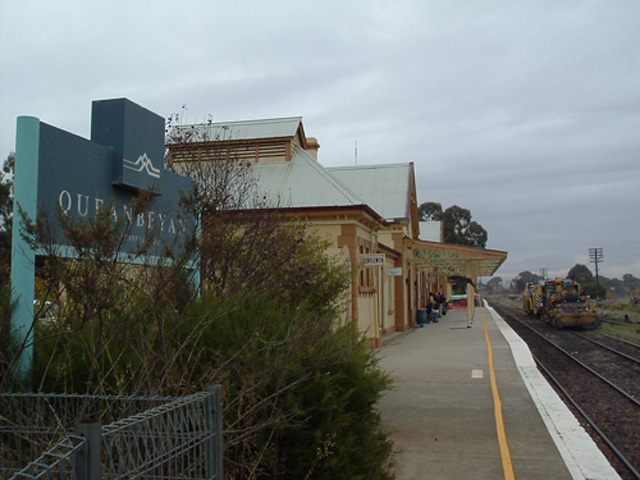
Queanbeyan railway station

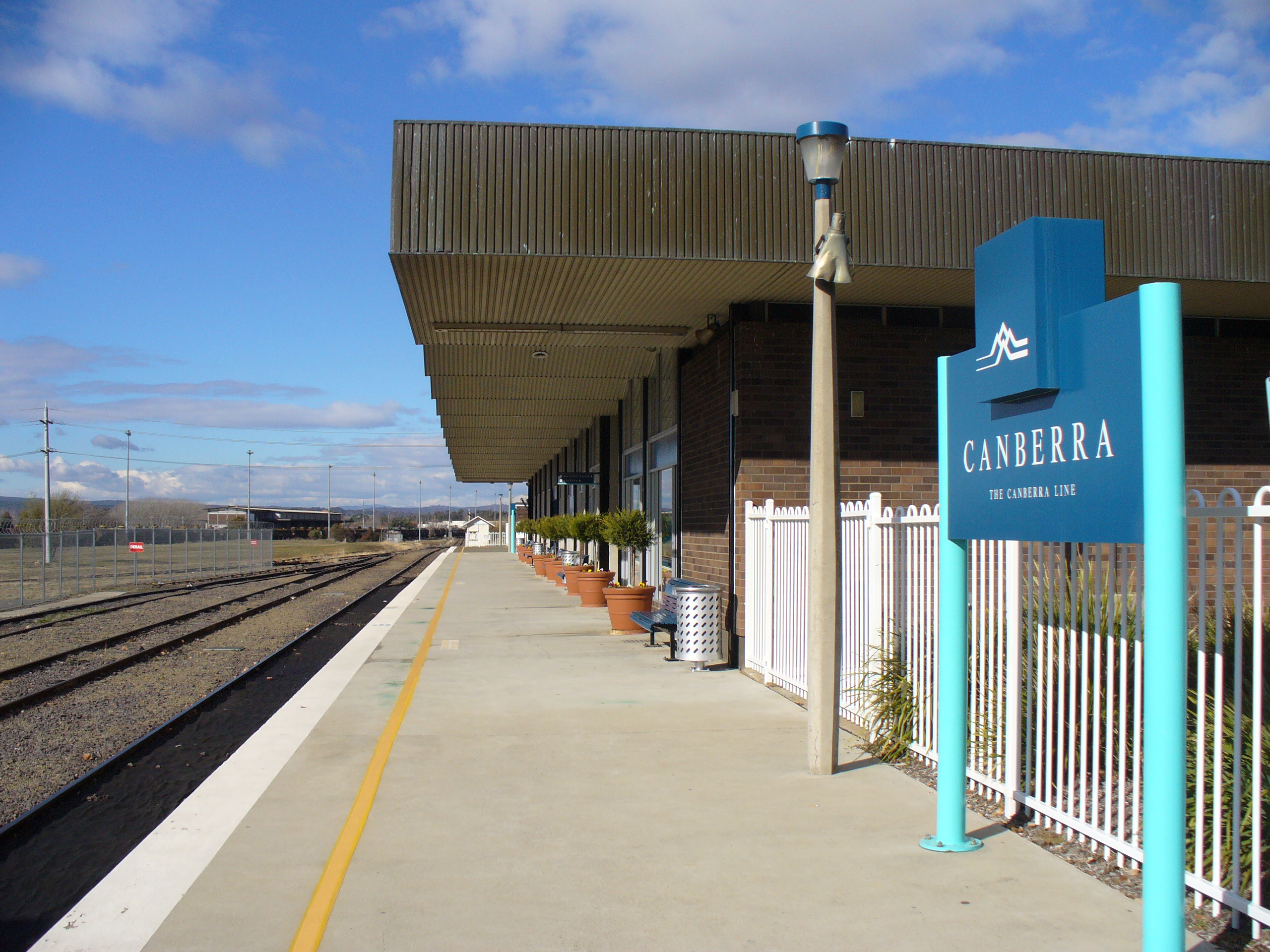
Canberra railway station

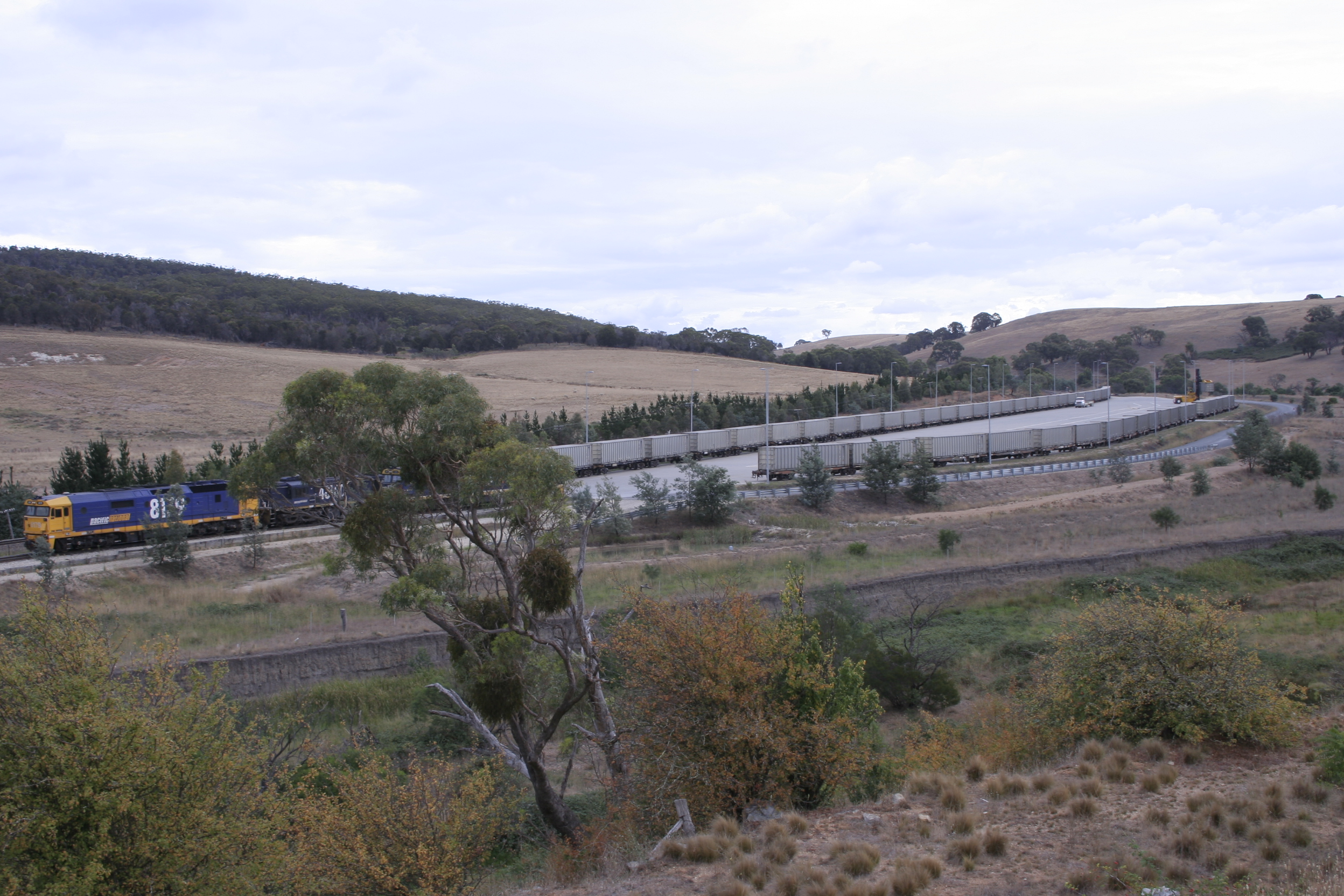
Intermodal transfer station south of Tarago, for landfill from Sydney

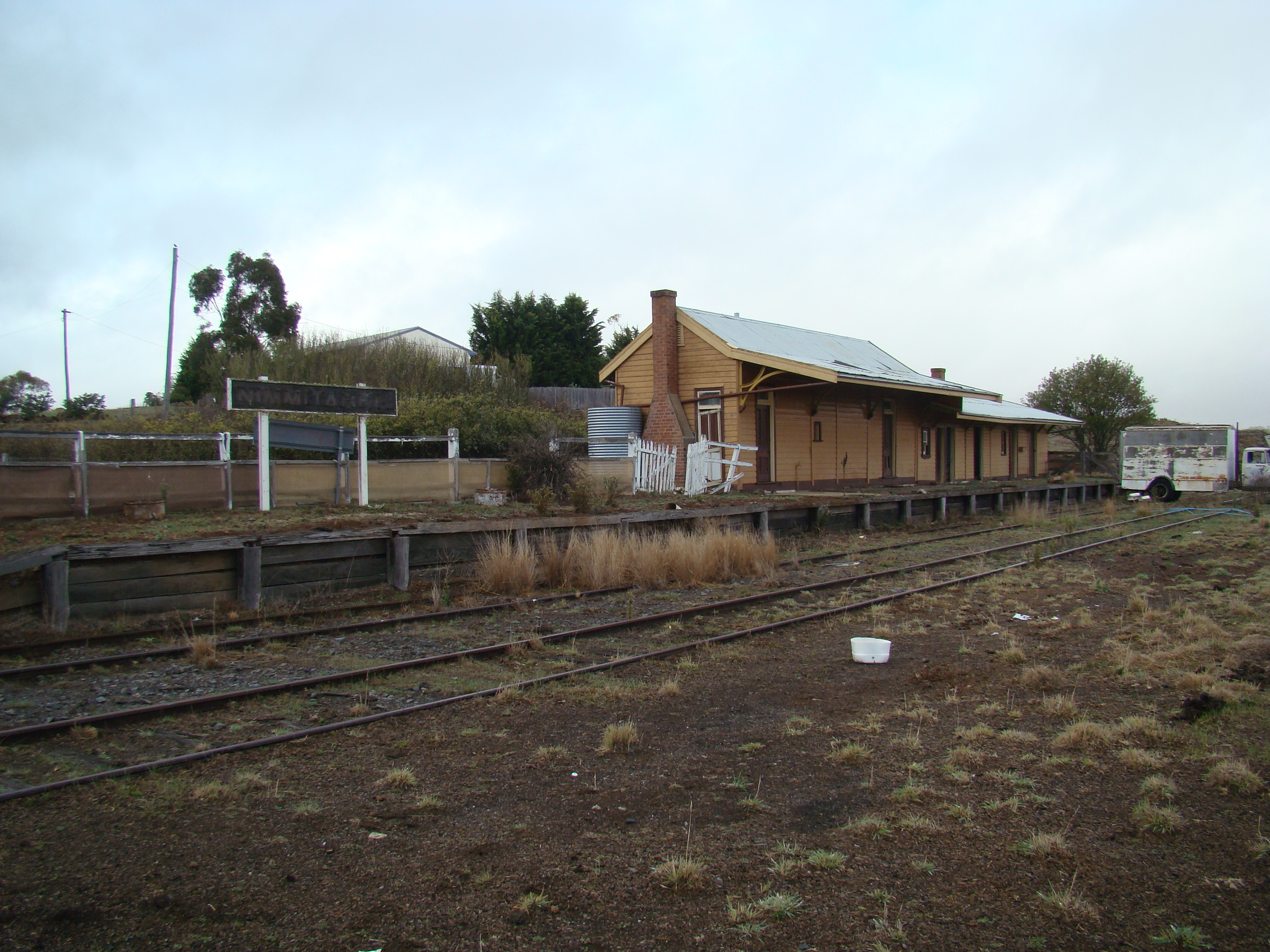
Nimmitabel railway station, closed in 1986. Looking south towards Bombala from the goods shed. The buildings are not maintained and are crumbling

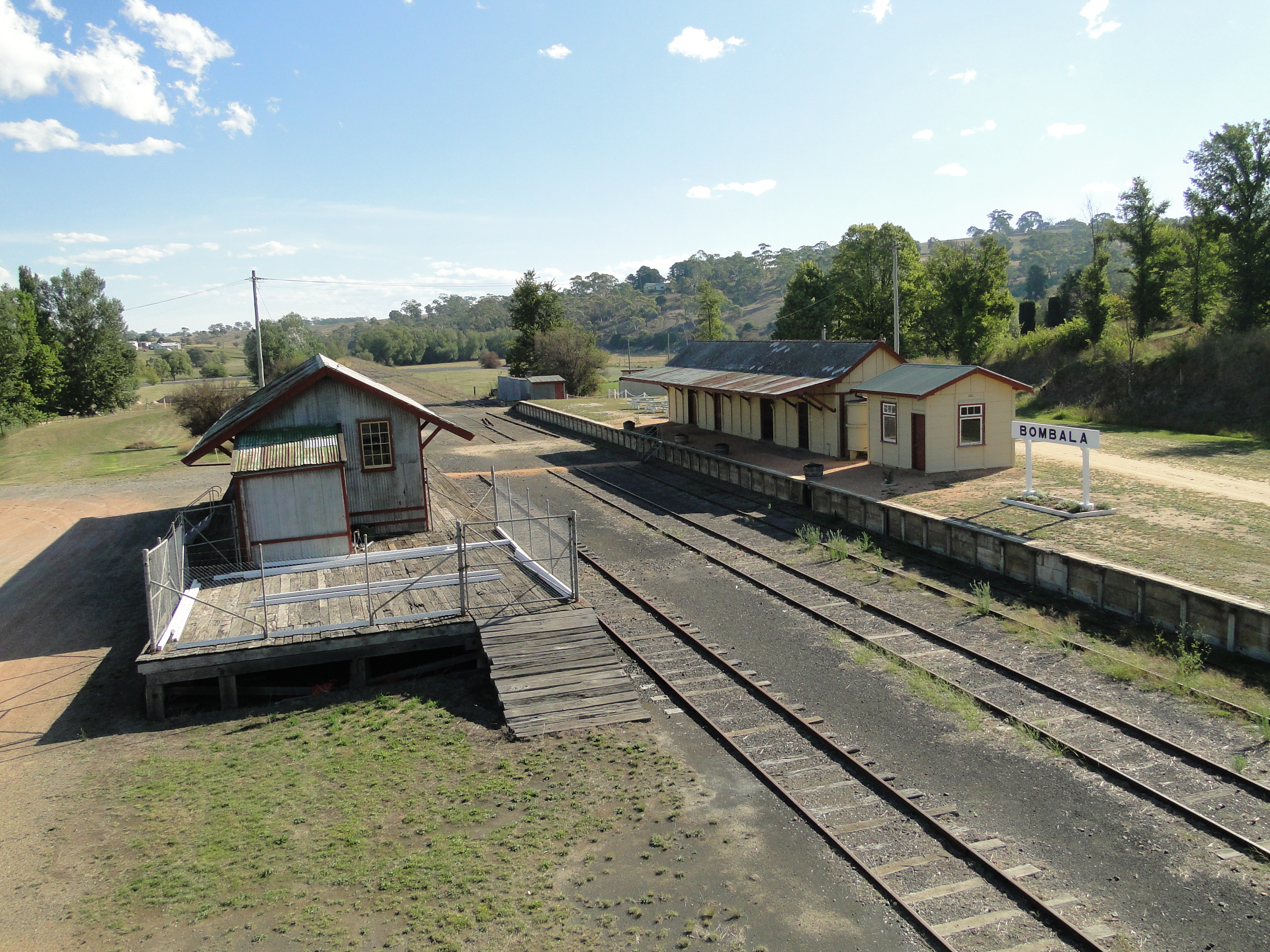
Bombala station. The last train called here in 1986. The building has been restored and is used for community activities

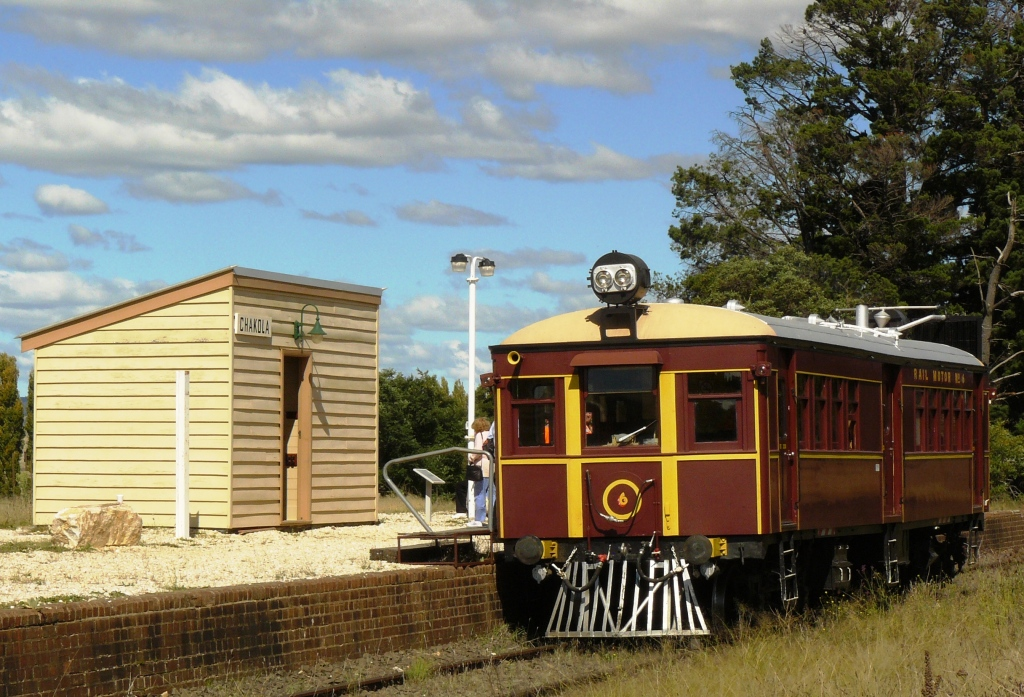
Cooma Monaro Railway's CPH6 at Chakola station
