= Bombala railway station =

Former railway station in New South Wales, Australia

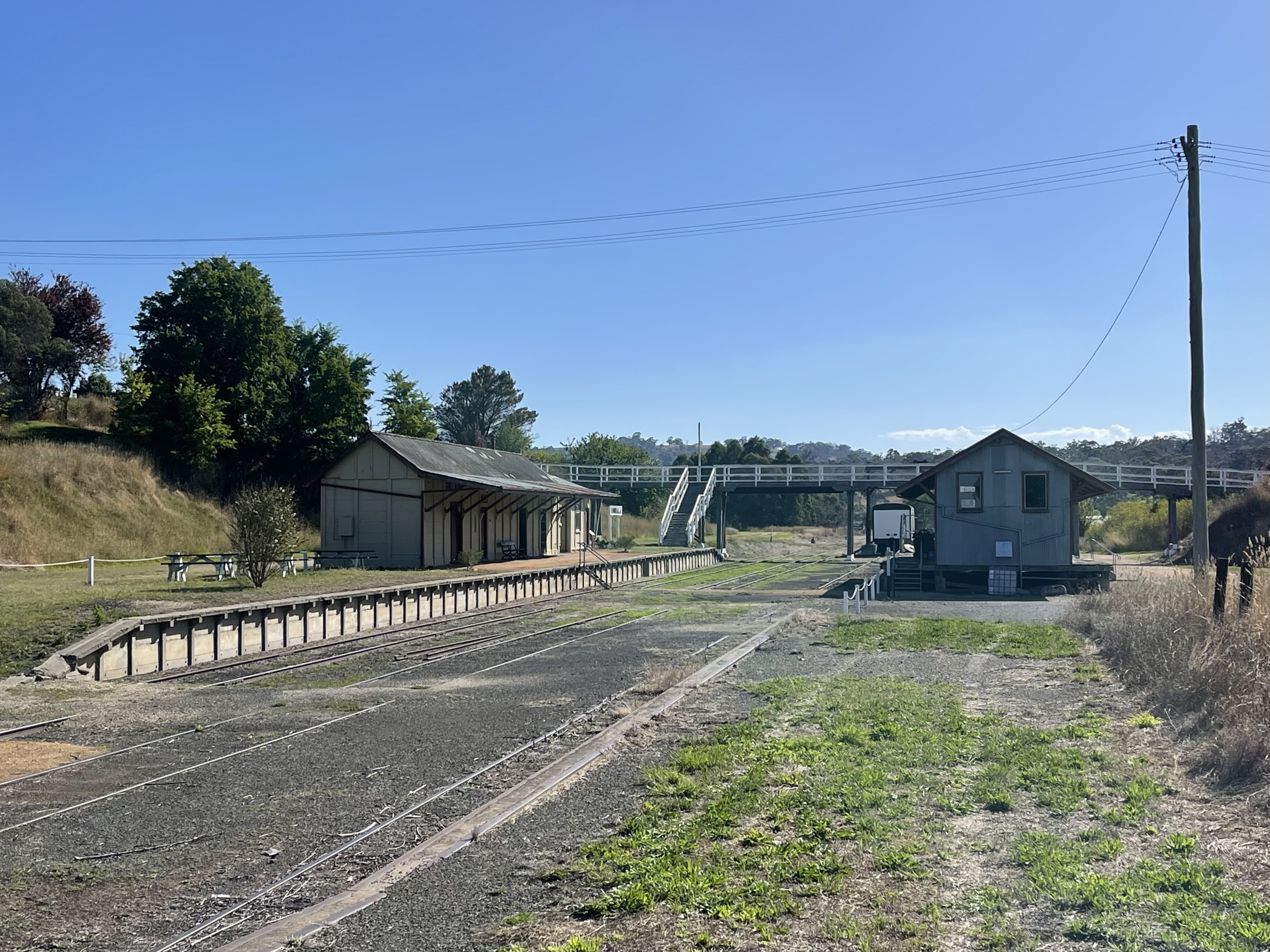

- Location within New South Wales Location within Australia
- 36.9081°S 149.2377°E
- Location: Bombala railway line, Bombala, Snowy Monaro Regional Council, New South Wales, Australia

Site notes
- Owner: Transport Asset Manager of New South Wales

New South Wales Heritage Register
- Official name: Bombala Railway Station and yard group
- Type: state heritage (complex / group)
- Designated: 2 April 1999
- Reference no.: 1091
- Type: Railway Platform/Station
- Category: Transport – Rail

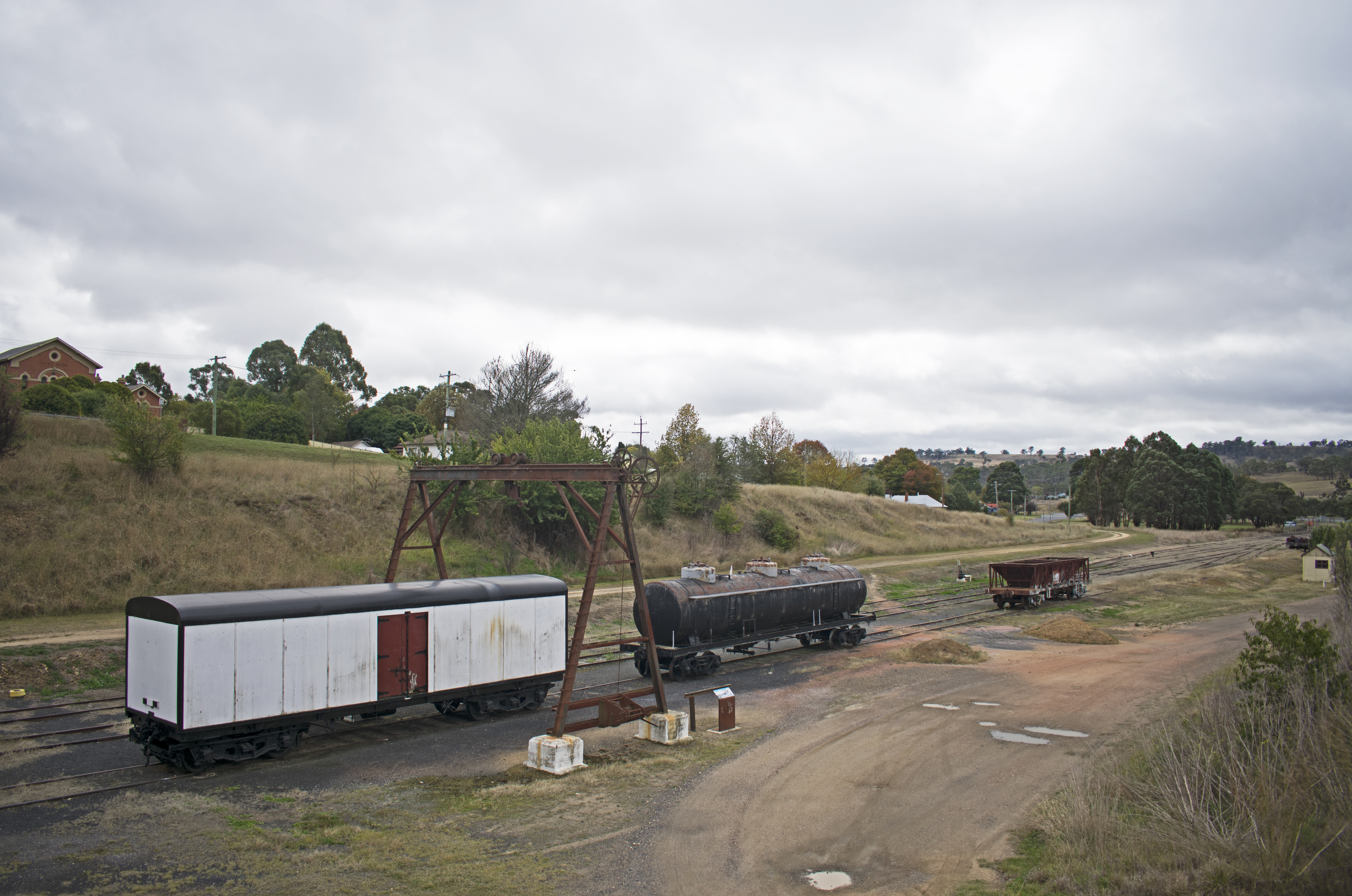
Railway cars at the station

Bombala railway station is a heritage-listed former railway station and terminus of the Bombala railway line at Bombala, in the Monaro region of New South Wales, Australia. The station complex was added to the New South Wales State Heritage Register on 2 April 1999.

== History ==
The line was opened in 1921, it connected Bombala with Cooma. It was closed in 1986.

== Description ==
The heritage-listed complex includes a type 11 pre-cast concrete station building, a pre-cast concrete, skillion roofed signal box, a corrugated iron WC lamp room, and a goods shed. It also includes the timber platform face and footbridge. The landscape of the station and yard precinct also falls within the heritage listing. All heritage-listed buildings and structures at the station date from 1921.

== Heritage listing ==
Bombala is a site of high significance as one of the most intact and well preserved country sites from late in the railways expansion period, c. 1920. The buildings and structures are all excellent examples of their type and the group presents as an important record of how country terminus stations operated.

The footbridge is unusual in such a location and a superb example of a non-standard solution to site access. The station building is one of the best pre-cast concrete structures to survive in the State.

Bombala railway station was listed on the New South Wales State Heritage Register on 2 April 1999 having satisfied the following criteria.

The place possesses uncommon, rare or endangered aspects of the cultural or natural history of New South Wales.

This item is assessed as historically rare. This item is assessed as scientifically rare. This item is assessed as arch. rare. This item is assessed as socially rare.
