= Canberra railway station =

Railway station in Canberra, Australia

Canberra
- Westbound view from the platform, October 2026

General information
- Location: Burke Crescent, Kingston, Australian Capital Territory; Australia
- Coordinates: 35°19′09″S 149°08′57″E
- Owner: Transport Asset Manager of New South Wales
- Operator: NSW TrainLink
- Line: Canberra
- Distance: 329.61 kilometres (204.81 mi) from Central
- Platforms: 1
- Tracks: 3
- Connections: Bus

Construction
- Structure type: Ground
- Accessible: Yes

Other information
- Station code: CBR

History
- Opened: 21 April 1924
- Rebuilt: 26 October 1966

Passengers
- 216,988

Services
Preceding station	NSW TrainLink	Following station
Terminus	NSW TrainLink Southern Line Canberra Xplorer	Queanbeyan towards Sydney
Location

Canberra railway station is located in Kingston, a suburb of Canberra, Australian Capital Territory, serving the national capital. It is located on a branch of the Bombala railway line and is served by NSW TrainLink Southern services.

== History ==
The Commonwealth branch line to Canberra from Queanbeyan opened to goods traffic on Monday 25 May 1914.

Canberra Eastlake station opened on 21 April 1924, a decade after the goods railway. Passenger services had run between the Kingston Powerhouse and Queanbeyan for around six months prior to the station building opening.

In October 1926, the Great White Train visited Canberra station, attracting nearly 2,500 people. The train was established by the Australian-made Preference League as a traveling exhibition to promote Australian made goods and represented around thirty manufacturers from across New South Wales. The 230-yard (210 m)-long, 16 carriage train arrived just before 2pm on Saturday 23 October and stayed until the following evening before heading to Queanbeyan for a three-day stay.

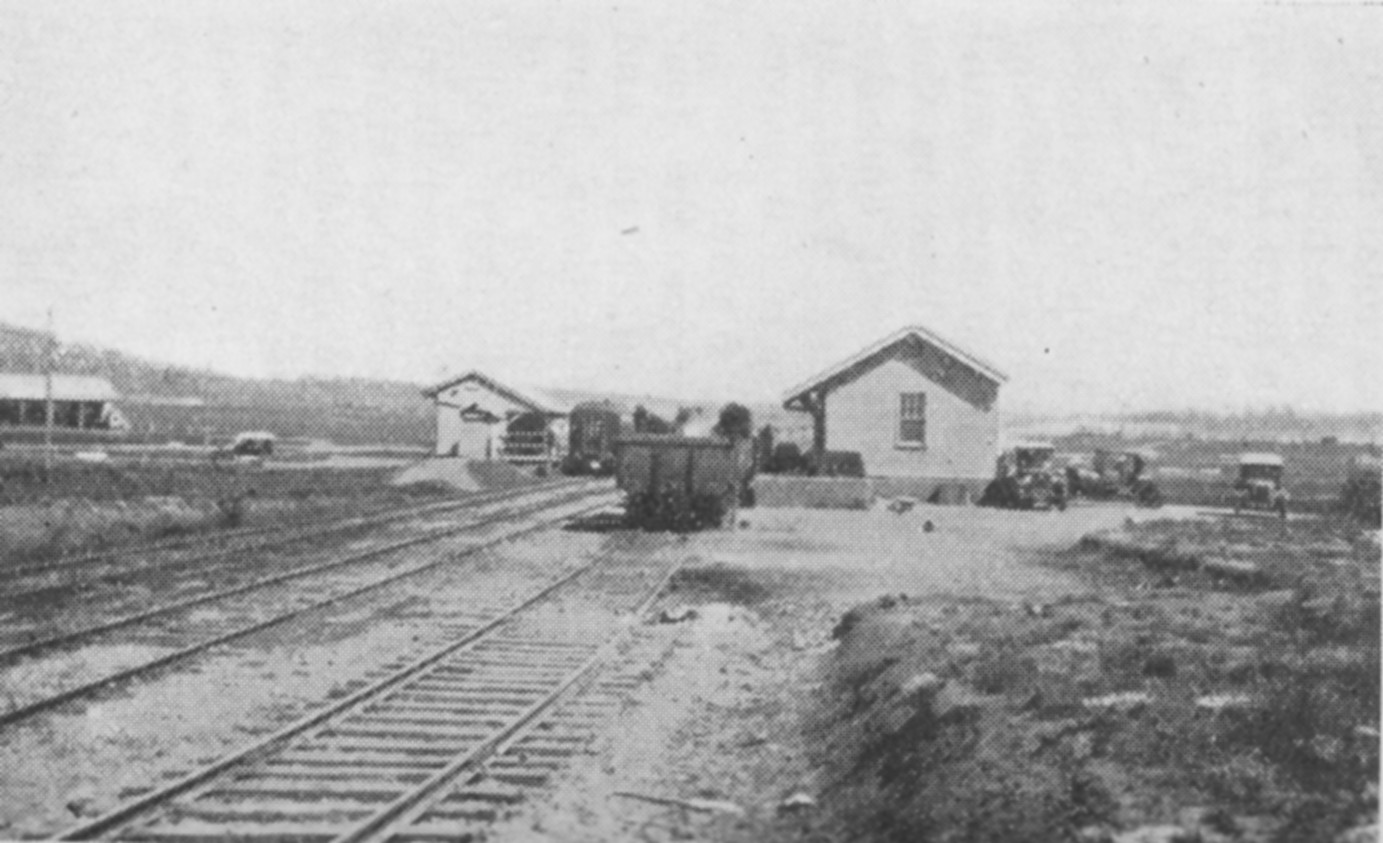
Canberra station in 1929

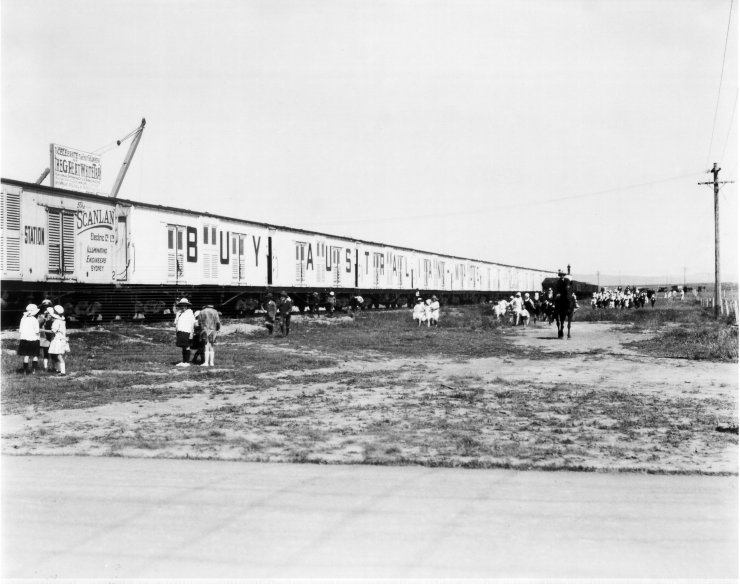
The Great White Train at Kingston railway yards 1926

By the end of 1927, six trains were arriving at Canberra on weekdays. The station came under the control of the Commonwealth Railways at this time.

By the late 1930s, the temporary station building had begun to receive criticism for its basic nature and lack of amenities. The station's office building was robbed by a suspected crime gang at Easter in 1933 and again a few days before Christmas in 1934. The Christmas railway robbery saw the door forced with an iron coupling bar and the safe being blown open. The suspected gang got away with just 258 pennies (A£1/1/6d or A$4.15), as only a few hours previously railway officials had removed £500 holiday takings from the safe.

In 1956 the ACT Advisory Council sent a comprehensive report to the Minister for the Interior Allen Fairhall, which noted the station was the "worst advertisement in Canberra".

In March 1961, an accident at Canberra station saw a 12-year-old boy lose his leg. Robert Wilkes had been playing on the locomotive turntable at the goods yard when he fell between the table and the track. A doctor had to amputate his right leg above the knee to free him.

The Minister for Shipping and Transport, Sir Gordon Freeth, announced in August 1965 that a new terminal building would be built in Canberra. At that time the location of the new terminal was unclear and a new site on Majura Road adjacent to Woolshed Creek near the airport was reserved for a new station.

In January 1966, the construction contract for a new railway terminal at the existing site in Kingston was awarded to T.H. O'Connor of Fyshwick. The new building was built alongside the existing structure on the same platform, which would later be demolished. The new building would be a combined passenger, parcels and administrative centre.

The terminal building was opened by the Minister for Transport & Shipping, Gordon Freeth on 26 October 1966. Built at a cost of $160,000, it was intended to be another temporary solution until a new, permanent home for railway opened closer to the airport "somewhere in the Pialligo area".

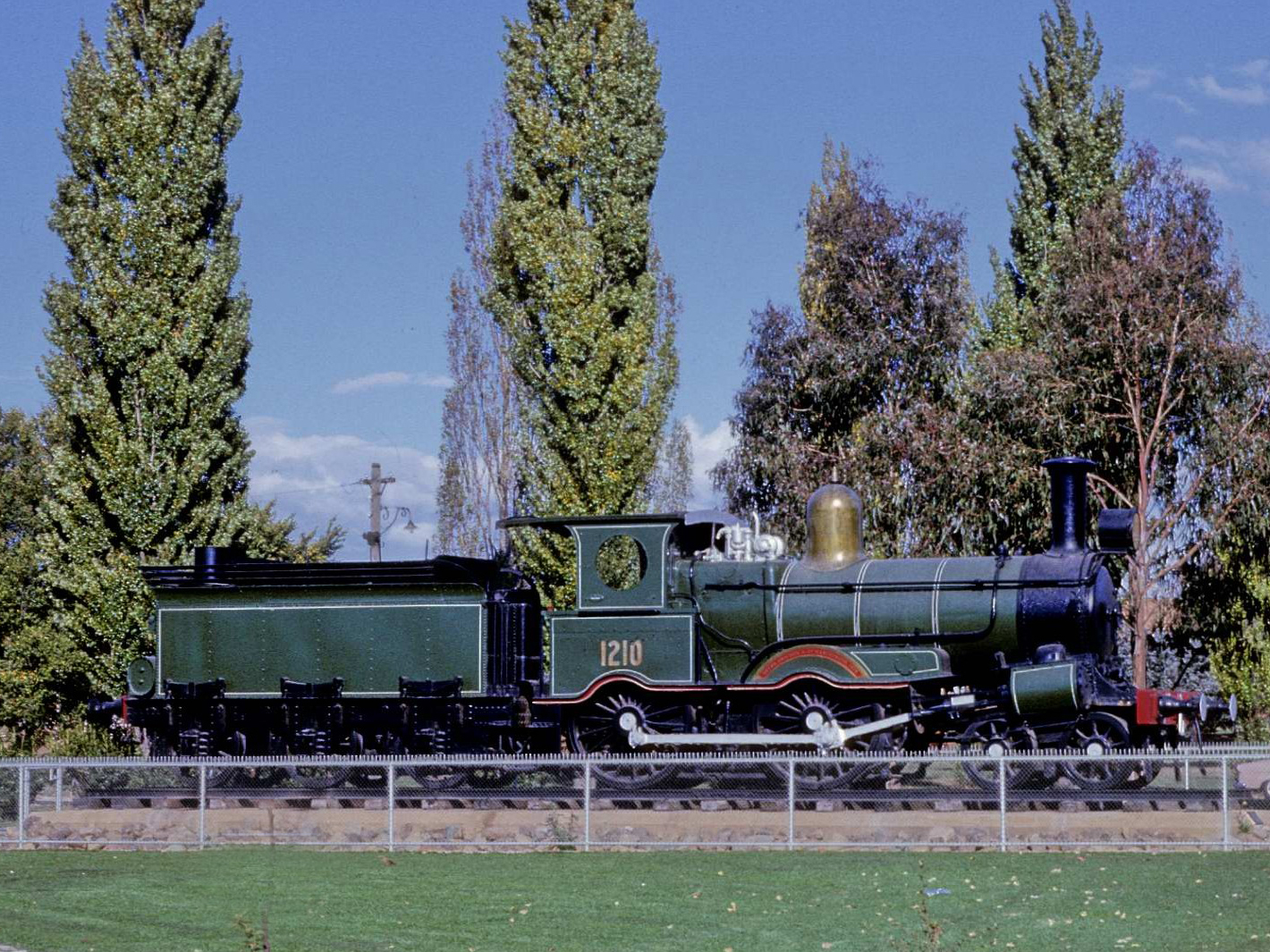
1210 on the plinth outside the station it occupied from January 1962 until September 1984

Canberra station, along with the line to Queanbeyan, was owned and staffed by the Commonwealth Railways and later Australian National although services were always operated by the New South Wales Government Railways and its successors. Despite numerous attempts to transfer the loss making line to the Government of New South Wales, it remained in Federal Government hands until May 1985 when it was transferred to the State Rail Authority.

Steam locomotive 1210 that had hauled the first train into Canberra in May 1914, was displayed on a plinth outside the station from January 1962 until September 1984, when it was moved to the Canberra Railway Museum and returned to service in 1988.

The ACT Government announced plans in March 2023 to build a new multi-modal station next to the current terminal building as part of the Eastlake urban redevelopment. The plans include co-location of the Canberra Railway Museum and integration of a future light rail line.

Transport for NSW announced in 2024 that Canberra station would receive an accessibility upgrade, as part of the NSW Government's $800.7 million Safe Accessible Transport program.

== Services ==
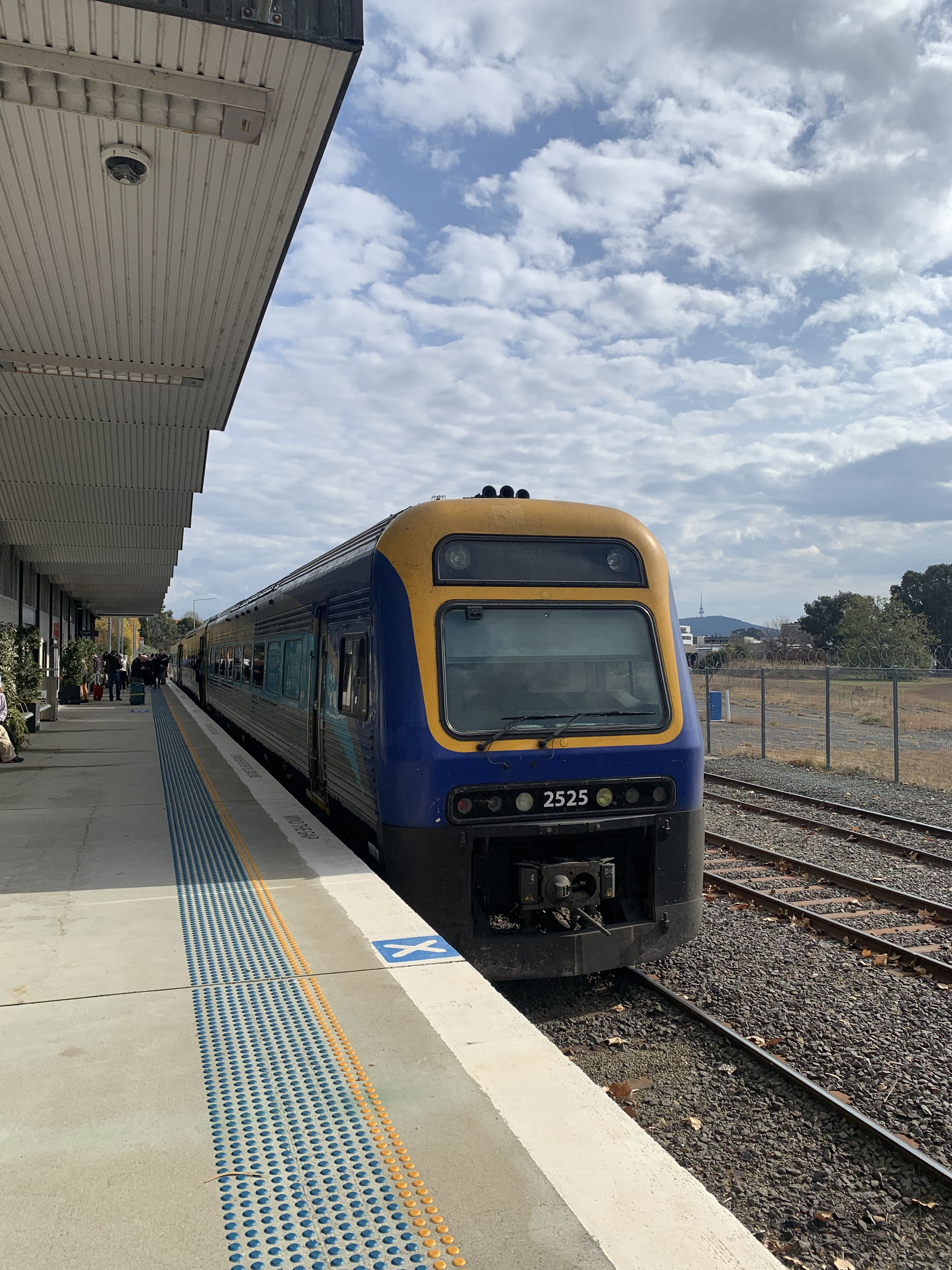
Terminated ex-Sydney Xplorer at Canberra station

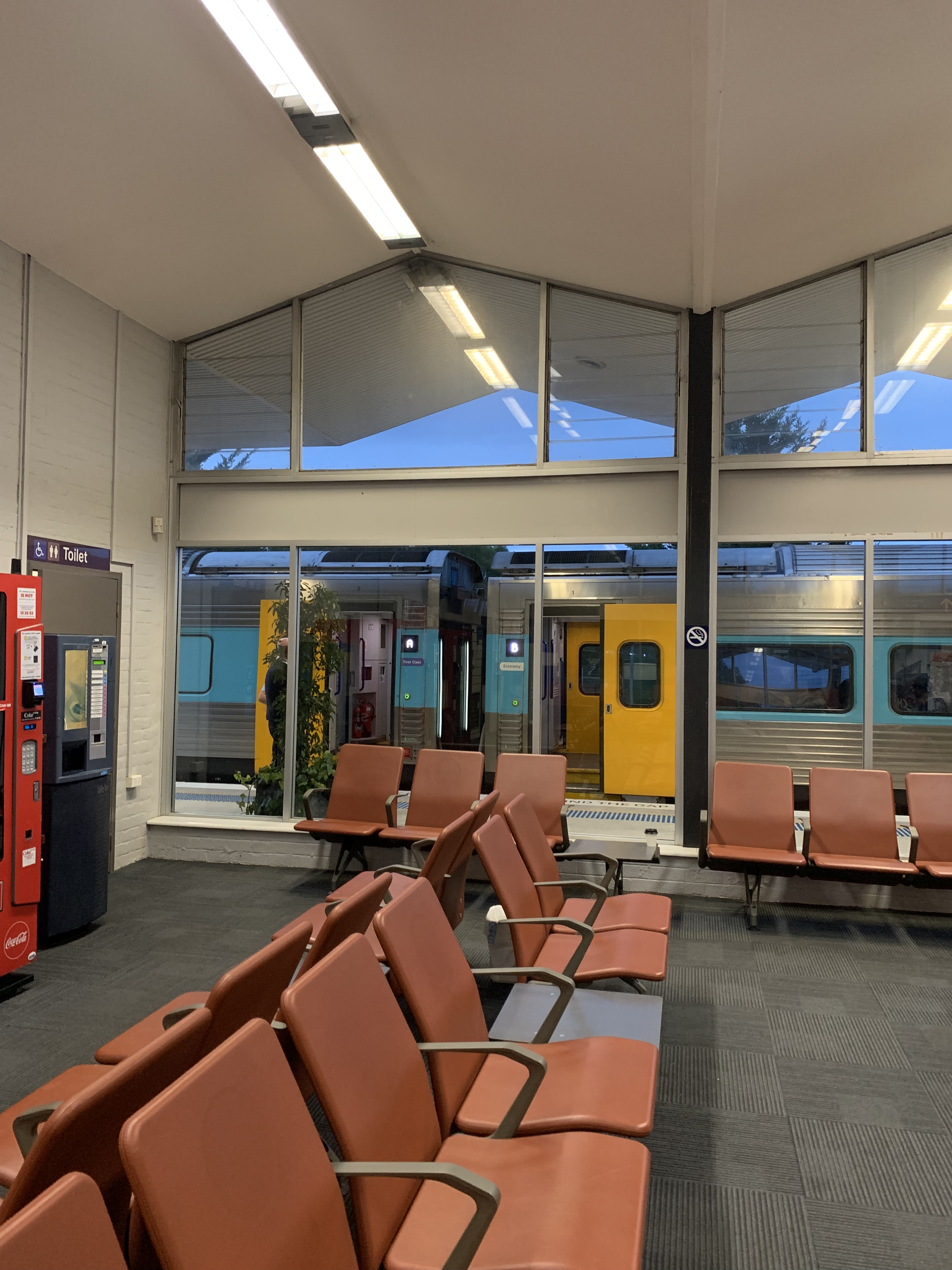
Waiting room

Canberra is the terminus for the New South Wales Xplorer service by NSW TrainLink from Sydney. It is also served by NSW TrainLink road coach services to Cootamundra, Bombala and Eden. V/Line coach service to Bairnsdale also operates via the station.

Platform	Line	Stopping pattern	Notes
1	Southern Region	services to Sydney Central	

== New location proposals ==
The current site of Canberra's railway terminal is broadly accepted to be accidental, owing to a lack of consensus and political will to agree on a suitable location. Even as Australia's most planned city, no agreement has been reached for a permanent home for the city's railway, with no fewer than eight separate locations considered over the past 100 years. Canberra's current station building is the city's second temporary rail terminal.

In 1925 plans for the city of Canberra were gazetted, which included a railway extending from Kingston to Dickson via Russell and the city. Stations on this line were planned in 1918 to include Russell, Anzac Parade, Ainslie Ave and MacArthur Ave. The short-lived Kingston to Civic goods railway was constructed along this route in 1921.

In 1938 the Federal Minister of the Interior John McEwen stated in Parliament that the Kingston station was temporary and that the "site of the permanent railway station for Canberra is in Civic Centre" and that the "present station is well off the route of the permanent railway". Though in 1940, the rails that had been laid in anticipation of a permanent Civic Line were removed and by the 1950s, locations south of the lake for the new station were under consideration, including Bowen Place (adjacent to Kings Ave bridge) and State Circle (adjacent to Parliament House).

=== Garema Place ===
Civic Centre Station opened in 1921 in what is now known as Garema Place, on a temporary line that was to be later replaced with a permanent construction. The station served the Brickworks Railway from Yarralumla and a goods railway from Kingston via Russell. The main railway was cut off from Kingston in the floods of 1922, but the rail corridor remained reserved for a future line until 1950 when the Canberra City Plan was altered and the railway corridor, which was not seen as 'modern', was abandoned in favour of urban development.

=== Woolshed Creek ===
In 1965 the Commissioner for Commonwealth Railways, Keith Smith, announced that a site of about four chains (88 yards) had been set aside for a new passenger terminal to the west of Woolshed Creek in Piallago, adjacent to Majura Rd. The land was chosen because it was flat, there were no drainage problems, and it was close to the city and airport. The site was also along the proposed Canberra to Yass railway line and high-speed line to Sydney, which were being planned at the time. The new temporary station was instead built in Kingston, with the Woolshed Creek passenger terminal site and proposed railway corridor being later used for vehicular transport following the construction of Majura Parkway, which opened in 2016.

=== Jerrabomberra Creek ===
The ACT Government published plans for Canberra's East Lake area in 2010 that would see the removal of most of its railway infrastructure, making way for urban development. A new passenger railway station was proposed to sit between Jerrabomberra Creek and the Monaro Highway.

=== Canberra City Cooyong Street ===
In 2013 a report by the Federal Labor government proposed a three-platform station under Ainslie Avenue – north of Cooyong Street and the Canberra Centre. The location would require four kilometres of tunnel passing through Mount Ainslie. The proposed location is a close approximation to the city station included in Walter Burley Griffin's plan for Canberra.

=== Canberra Airport ===
In 2016 the ACT Government and Canberra Airport backed moving Canberra Station 1 km (0.62 mi) further from the city to a new location at the airport. The Government intended passengers to transfer there with the future light rail service to the city. In 2021 there were no fewer than 16 daily coach services between Canberra's CBD and Sydney Central, yet none between Canberra Airport and Sydney, bringing in to question the demand for a high-speed rail terminal at the airport. Should the airport be chosen as the new location, Canberra station would be 7 kilometres (4.3 mi) from the CBD, the furthest distance of any Australian capital other than Darwin.

In 2017, the ACT Government announced it had protected from development a fork-shaped railway corridor stretching from Eaglehawk on the ACT-NSW border heading southeast to Canberra Airport with an alternative branch southwest to Ainslie Ave. The route runs roughly parallel to Majura Parkway. The ACT Government also indicated it was no longer content for Canberra to be on a spur-line between Sydney and Melbourne and was in discussions with the Federal Government on including Canberra on the main line of any high-speed rail route proposal.

There are currently no published plans for a direct heavy railway connecting Queanbeyan, Canberra Airport and a station in Canberra City along preserved Majura rail corridors. The 11 km route could provide an alternative gateway for Canberra, aligning with the NSW Government's commitment to faster rail between Canberra and Sydney. In 2018 the NSW Government announced its intent to "look at" a light rail connection between Queanbeyan and Canberra, without indicating a route preference.

=== Ipswich Street ===
A further location for Canberra's railway terminal was proposed in 2019 by the Fyshwick Business Association, which submitted a response to the ACT Government's 2020-21 Budget Consultation to move the passenger railway station 1.5 km (0.93 mi) south east to 16 Ipswich Street. The group supporting proposals that the current station site in Kingston be "freed-up" for redevelopment.

=== Newcastle Street ===
In November 2022, the Fyshwick Business Association released another proposal dubbed the Eastwick Greenline, which centred on relocating the railway terminal further east to Newcastle Street to form a multi-model transport hub, linked to a future transport corridor by converting the existing heavy railway between Fyshwick and Kingston to light rail. The proposal includes extending the existing railway approximately 3km north to Canberra Airport, which would create an 'eastern loop' line when the line from the city to the airport along Constitution Ave is constructed.

=== The Causeway ===
ACT Government plans to move Canberra station were re-ignited in 2022 as part of a consultation on the re-development of the surrounding East Lake area. Under revised plans released in March 2023, a railway terminal building and platforms are to be constructed approximately 100m to the east of the current station building along the existing rail alignment. The new terminal will form part of a multimodal transport hub and include the co-location of the Canberra Railway Museum. The current station building would be demolished under the plan in order that The Causeway be extended south to meet Burke Crescent. Indicative plans show the Rapid Network extending along the existing railway towards Fyshwick, suggesting the line could be converted to Tram-Train status allowing heavy and light rail to share tracks.
