= Queanbeyan railway station =

Railway station in New South Wales, Australia

Queanbeyan
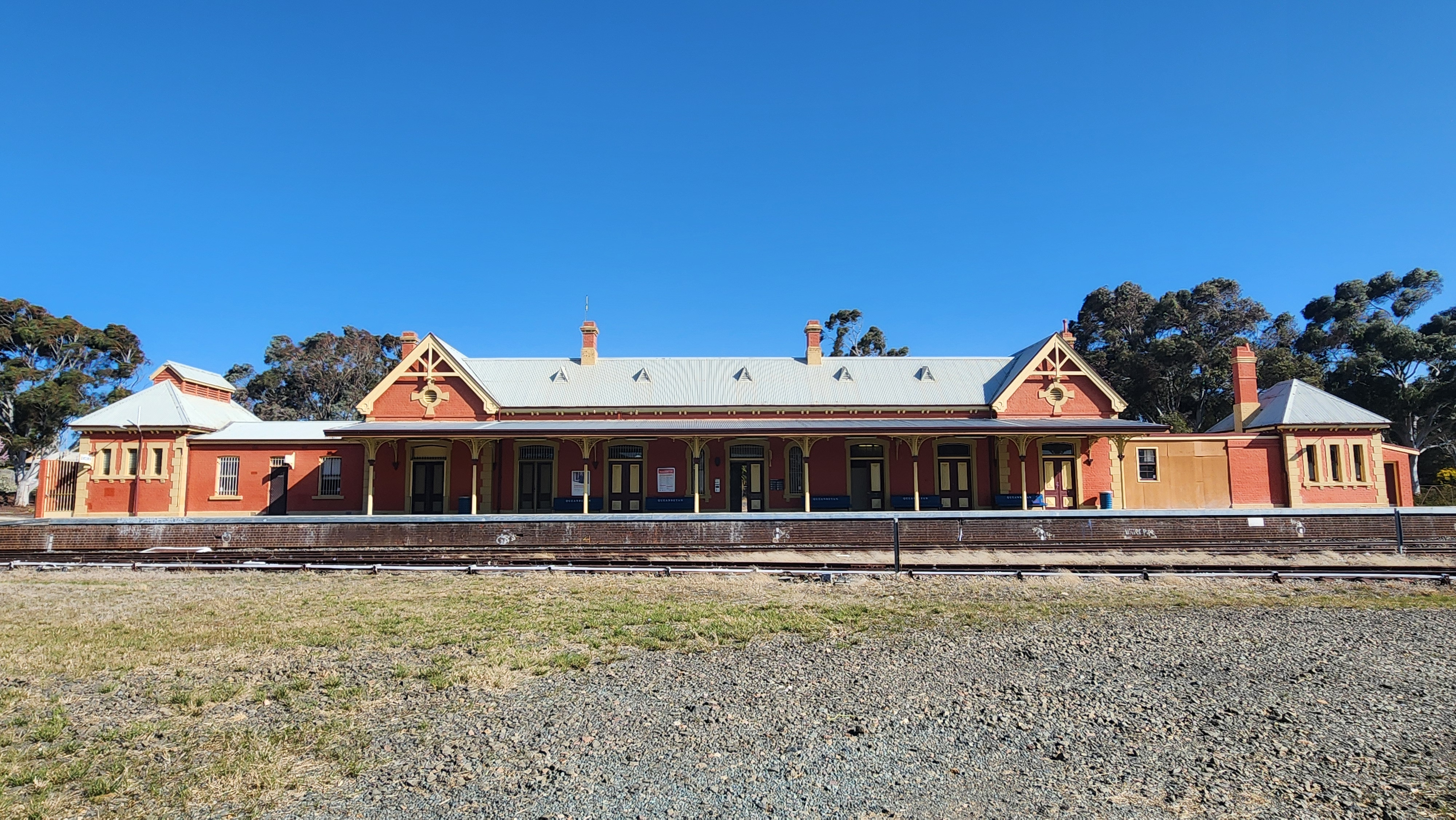
- View from Railway Street

General information
- Location: Henderson Street, Queanbeyan; Australia
- Coordinates: 35°20′34″S 149°13′37″E
- Owner: Transport Asset Manager of New South Wales
- Operator: NSW TrainLink
- Line: Bombala
- Distance: 321.46 kilometres (199.75 mi) from Central
- Platforms: 1
- Tracks: 3
- Connections: Bus

Construction
- Structure type: Ground
- Accessible: Yes

Other information
- Station code: QBN

History
- Opened: 8 September 1887

Services
Preceding station	NSW TrainLink	Following station
Canberra Terminus	NSW TrainLink Southern Line Canberra Xplorer	Bungendore towards Sydney
Location
- Location within New South Wales

Queanbeyan railway station is a heritage-listed railway station located on the Bombala line in New South Wales, Australia. It serves the town of Queanbeyan.

== History ==
Queanbeyan station opened on 8 September 1887 when the Bombala line was extended from Bungendore. It was added to the New South Wales State Heritage Register on 2 April 1999.

The construction contract for the Bungendore to Michelago section was awarded to Alex Johnston on 27 May 1884. The station location chosen was in the Oaks Paddock, two kilometres from the centre of town, which was chosen to avoid the need to demolish the hospital and cemetery. Construction of the station was completed in March 1887 and it opened in September that year (Sydney Trains, 2016, 6).

Construction of the station building, station master's residence, and gatekeeper's cottage were let to a Joseph Jordan on 12 July 1886. The station building was officially opened September 1887 and it is likely that the station master's and gatekeeper's residences were completed the same year.

In 1884 the NSW government had decreed that, in order to save costs, railway station buildings should be constructed from timber and iron. That Queanbeyan was exempt from this policy shows the status of the station within the NSW network, it was one of only 10 stations built between 1887 and 1892 to have brick station buildings. The remaining 121 stations built complied with the policy of using cheaper construction materials.

The platform was built on the Down (south) side of the railway line, with a carriage dock at the Sydney end of the platform and a crossing loop and stock loop siding on the Up (north) side. The loading bank and goods shed were on the Down side to the west of the station, with a public level crossing at Crest Road, which was abolished on 18 December 1955.

It served as the terminus until the line was extended to Michelago on 8 December 1887.

In March 1913, Queanbeyan became a junction station when construction commenced on the line to Canberra.

Major additions and other changes to the railway precinct/yard at Queanbeyan included alterations to the parcels office and refreshment room (1890), an office erected for the Sub-Inspector of Per Way (1891), small loading bank provided (1891), engine shed built (1896), gantry crane installed (1903) unloading bank built, and laying in a siding for unloading materials for the Canberra Branch railway line (1913), crossing laid in to Canberra Branch and locomotive water supply increased by 810kL (1924), ash pit built (1927), 60' turntable transferred from Nimmitabel to Queanbeyan (1926), portable workshop provided for the rail motor fitters (1950), siding laid in for stabling of 2-car diesel trains (1952), refreshment rooms closed (1956), renewing goods shed stage in steel and concrete (1963), additional shelter over goods shed stage erected (1961), and rest house closed (1974).nswshr-1226-1747

A Gatekeeper's residence at Crest Road remains where built west of the station, but is no longer in railway ownership.

Until its cessation in September 1988, the Canberra Monaro Express divided at Queanbeyan with separate portions for Canberra and Cooma.

Part of the goods yard was transferred to Council for community use c. 1999

== Services ==
Queanbeyan is served by three daily NSW TrainLink Xplorer services in each direction operating between Sydney and Canberra. NSW TrainLink also operate a road coach service from Queanbeyan to Cootamundra.

The station is frequently used by Canberra Railway Museum specials.

Platform	Line	Stopping pattern	Notes
1	Southern Region	services to Sydney Central & Canberra	

== Description ==
The heritage-listed complex includes the type 5, first class brick station building (1887), the brick platform, weatherboard signal box with skillion roof (1920s), the stationmaster's residence at 43 Henderson Road (1887), the F-frame signal cabin with flat roof and hardiplank boards, the turntable (1926), water column, water tank and small ganger's shed.

Station building (1887)

Queanbeyan is the largest and most elaborate station building on the Bombala Line. The station buildings at Queanbeyan present as a symmetrical layout and elevation, with a central waiting room with two single storey structures to either side connected by small pavilions. The plan of the station features a central waiting room flanked by a kitchen, storeroom, refreshment room and dining room to one side; and a Station Master's office, parcels room, ladies waiting room and bathrooms to the other side.

The station buildings are constructed of brick with a painted finish and quoining to building corners. The roofs are gabled and clad in corrugated iron with corbelled brick chimneys and gable vents. The main building features a transverse gable to each end. Gable ends feature decorative timber barge boards with central circular vents and a group of three arched windows below. The platform and rear verandahs have timber posts with curved iron brackets. Timber panelled French doors and timber double hung sash windows have moulded surrounds.

Platform

A recent study by Australian Museum Consulting, commissioned by Sydney Trains, found that Queanbeyan Station is one of only eleven remaining stations in the New South Wales train network that has a precast concrete platform structure. All remaining precast platforms in the network are in poor condition or are likely to require reconstruction or demolition in the future. Discussions with Sydney Trains Heritage Division indicate that Queanbeyan Station has been identified as a good location to provide interpretation of this rare and endangered platform type. Interpretation is a conservation strategy that would mitigate the loss of significant fabric and technical value of the platform at this site.

Signal box (1920s) and Signal frame

The two signalling structures are simple square structures with single pitch roofs clad in corrugated iron and timber framed walls clad in weatherboard (1920s) or hardiplank.

Station Master's Residence (1887)

The brick Station Master's residence features a standard L-shaped plan with symmetrical front facade with full width verandah, a hipped roof clad in corrugated iron, and corbelled brick chimneys.

The station group including the station building and Station Master's residence, platform, signal box, signal frame, turntable, water column and water tank have a high level of integrity. The gangers shed has a moderate level of integrity.

== Heritage listing ==
Queanbeyan Railway Precinct is of state significance as a late Victorian period railway precinct that remains relatively intact and includes several original items from the 1880s including the 1885 roadside station building and c. 1887 Station Master's residence. The station building is particularly significant, being a fine example of a Victorian first class station building. The station building is the largest and most ornate of the station buildings on the Bombala Line, signifying Queanbeyan as an important location in Southern NSW, even prior to the declaration of Canberra as the nation's capital.

Queanbeyan railway station was listed on the New South Wales State Heritage Register on 2 April 1999 having satisfied the following criteria.

The place is important in demonstrating the course, or pattern, of cultural or natural history in New South Wales.

The place has historic significance demonstrating the late 19th century development of the NSW railways. The site includes several items dating from the opening of the line at Queanbeyan in 1887 and has significance demonstrating the layout of a late 19th Century railway station. The station building as the largest and most ornate station on the line is particularly significant in demonstrating the importance of Queanbeyan as an important location in Southern NSW, even prior to the declaration of Canberra as the national capital.

The place is important in demonstrating aesthetic characteristics and/or a high degree of creative or technical achievement in New South Wales.

The site has aesthetic significance as a railway precinct that retains several original items that demonstrate railway design in the 1880s. The 1887 station building is a fine example of a Victorian first class station building with fabric and fine detailing typical of the period. The 1887 Station Master's residence is a good example of a standard Victorian railway residence.

The place has strong or special association with a particular community or cultural group in New South Wales for social, cultural or spiritual reasons.

The site is of social significance to the local community on account of its lengthy association for providing an important source of employment, trade and social interaction for the local area. The site is significant for its ability to contribute to the local community's sense of place, is a distinctive feature of the daily life of many community members, and provides a connection to the local community's past.

The place is important in demonstrating the principal characteristics of a class of cultural or natural places/environments in New South Wales.

The station building has representative significance as a fine example of a first class station building, similar in design to other station designs from this period in NSW. Other items including the Station Master's residence, signal box, signal frame, gangers shed, turntable, water column and water tank, demonstrate widespread late 19th and early 20th Century railway customs, activities and design in NSW and are representative of similar items that are found in other railway sites across the state.
