= List of NSW TrainLink railway stations =

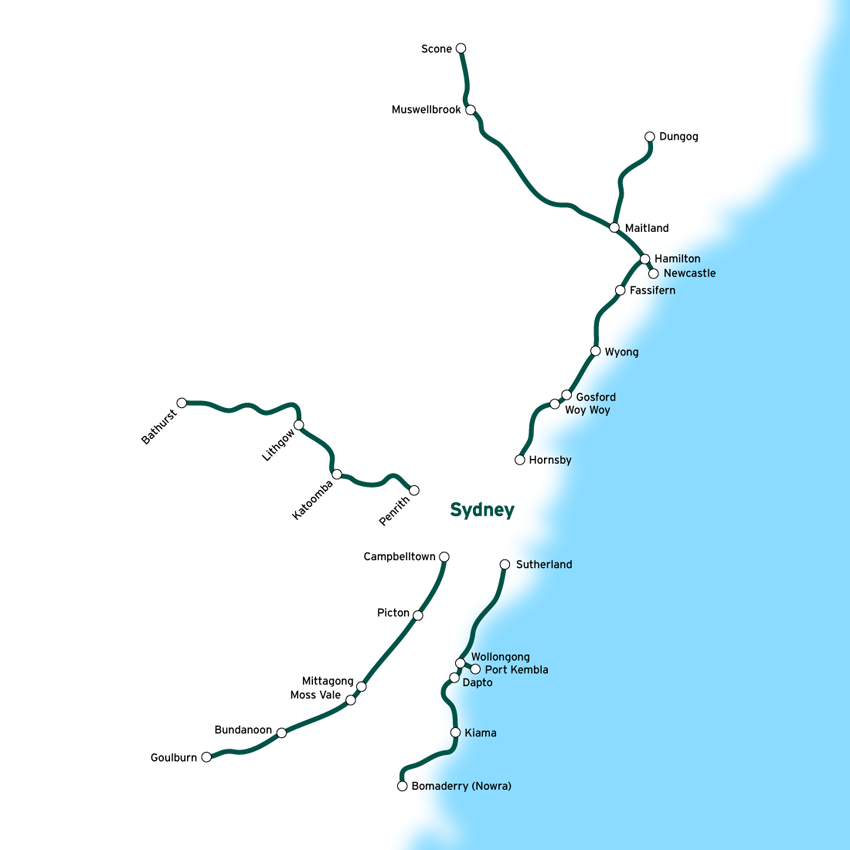
Intercity Trains Map

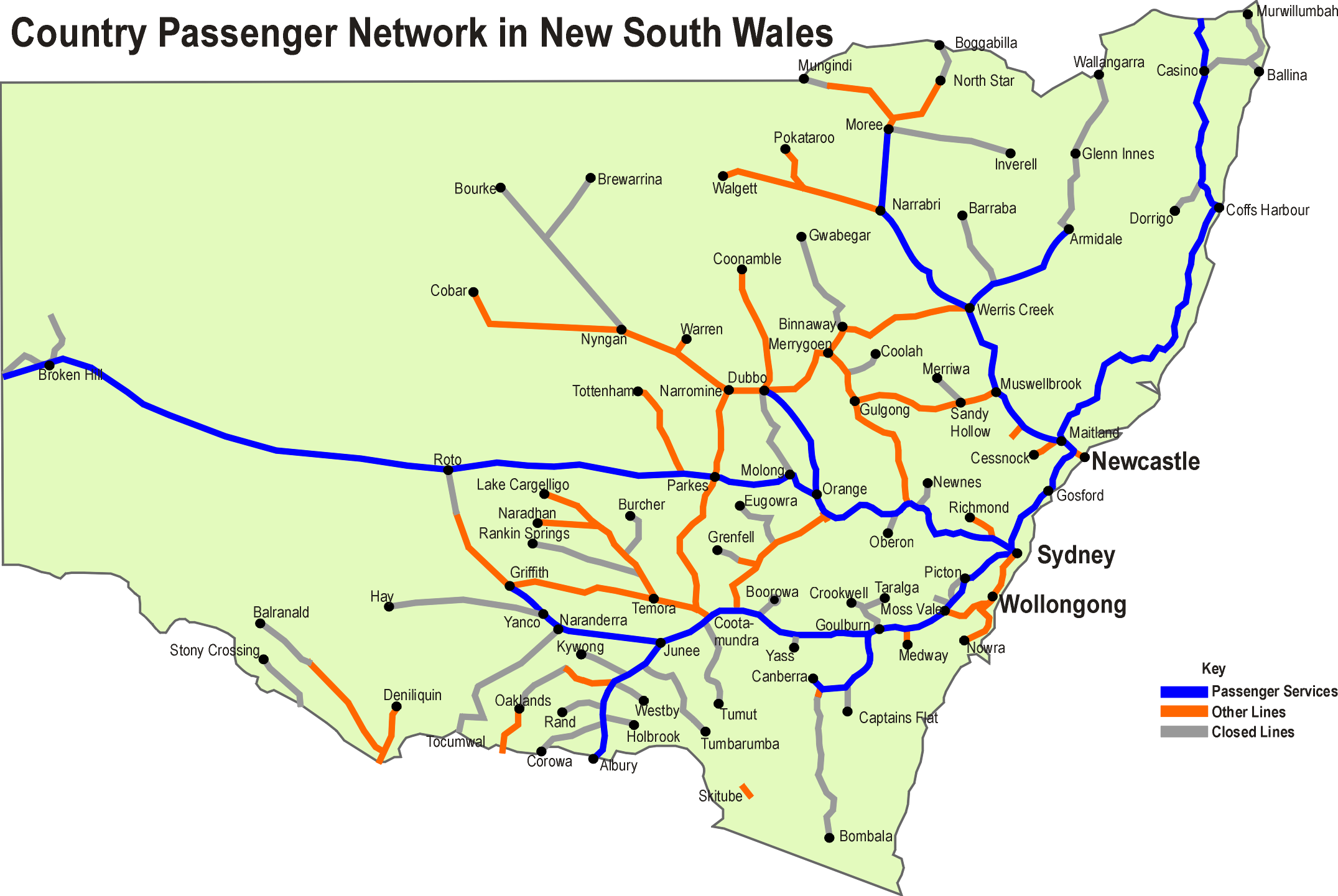
NSW TrainLink Interstate map (highlighted in blue)

NSW TrainLink is a train operator of passenger services outside the metropolitan area of Sydney in New South Wales. The network is divided into one tier – regional, long distance and interstate services. The network is served by a fleet of double-deck electric multiple units and single-deck diesel trains. Since July 2024, intercity services have been operated by Sydney Trains rolling stock.

== List of current stations ==
| Station | Code | Image | Served by | Distance from Central station (km) | Date opened | Previous name(s) |
|---|---|---|---|---|---|---|
| Aberdeen | ABD | | North Western Region | 300.730 | 20 October 1870 | |
| Adamstown | ADT | | Central Coast & Newcastle Line | 161.120 | 15 August 1887 | |
| Albion Park | ALP | Albion Park | South Coast Line | 103.340 | 9 November 1887 | Oak Flats (1887–1888) |
| Albury | ABX; ALY (Vic) | | Southern Region 1 non-NSW TrainLink service: V/Line Albury line | 642.40 | 3 February 1881 | |
| Armidale | ARM | | North Western Region | 578 | 3 February 1883 | |
| Austinmer | AUR | Austinmer | South Coast Line | 68.590 | 1 September 1887 | |
| Awaba | AWB | Awaba | Central Coast & Newcastle Line | 137.310 | 15 August 1887 | |
| Bargo | BZG | Bargo | Southern Highlands Line | 102.870 | 13 July 1919 | West Bargo (1919–1921) |
| Bathurst | BHS | Bathurst | Western Region | 239.900 | 4 April 1876 | |
| Bell | BEL | Bell | Blue Mountains Line | 137.120 | 1 May 1875 | Mount Wilson (1875–1889) |
| Bellambi | BLM | Bellambi | South Coast Line | 75.550 | 1889 | |
| Bellata | BZT | Bellata | North Western Region | 615 | 1 April 1897 | Woolabra (1897–1909) |
| Benalla | BEN | Benalla | Southern Region 1 non-NSW TrainLink service: V/Line Albury line | 742.6 | 18 August 1873 | |
| Beresfield | BLD | Beresfield | Hunter Line | 179.810 | 31 July 1925 | |
| Berry | BRY | Berry | South Coast Line | 140.840 | 2 June 1893 | |
| Blackheath | BKE | Blackheath | Blue Mountains Line | 120.670 | 1 August 1862 | |
| Blaxland | BXD | Blaxland | Blue Mountains Line | 71.480 | 11 July 1867 | Wascoes (1867–1879) |
| Blayney | BLA | Blayney | Western Region | 289.6 | 1 November 1876 | |
| Boggabri | BGB | Boggabri | North Western Region | 515 | 11 July 1882 | |
| Bomaderry | | Bomaderry | South Coast Line | 153.350 | 2 June 1893 | |
| Bombo | BMB | Bombo | South Coast Line | 117.550 | 9 November 1887 | North Kiama (1887–1889); Kiama (1889–1893); North Kiama (1893–1907) |
| Booragul | BGL | Booragul | Central Coast & Newcastle Line | 146.390 | 24 October 1926 | |
| Bowral | BWL | Bowral | Southern Region | 136.340 | 2 December 1867 | |
| Branxton | BNX | Branxton | Hunter Line | 215.600 | 24 March 1862 | |
| Brisbane (Roma Street) | - | Roma Street | North Coast Region 17 non-NSW TrainLink services: Airport line Beenleigh line Caboolture line Cleveland line Doomben line Exhibition line Ferny Grove line Gold Coast line Ipswich/Rosewood line Redcliffe Peninsula line Shorncliffe line Springfield line Sunshine Coast line Spirit of Queensland Spirit of the Outback Tilt Train Westlander | 987.9 | 14 June 1875 | |
| Broadmeadow | BMD | Broadmeadow | North Coast Region North Western Region | 162.940 | 15 August 1887 | |
| Broadmeadows | BMS | Broadmeadows | Southern Region 4 non-NSW TrainLink services: V/Line Albury line V/Line Seymour line V/Line Shepparton line Craigieburn line | 921 | 1 February 1873 | |
| Broken Hill | BHQ | Broken Hill | Western Region | 1,122.8 | 15 July 1919 (original site); 4 June 1957 (present site) | |
| Bullaburra | BUB | Bullaburra | Blue Mountains Line | 97.690 | 16 February 1925 | |
| Bulli | BUI | Bulli | South Coast Line | 72.150 | 21 June 1887 | |
| Bundanoon | BUN | Bundanoon | Southern Region | 162.260 | 6 August 1868 | Jordans Crossing (1868–1878); Jordans Siding (1878–1881) |
| Bungendore | BUX | Bungendore | Southern Region | 281.8 | 4 March 1885 | |
| Burradoo | BUO | Burradoo | Southern Highlands Line | 138.840 | 1870 | |
| Canberra | CBR | Canberra | Southern Region | 329.610 | 21 April 1924 | |
| Cardiff | CDF | Cardiff | Central Coast & Newcastle Line | 155.080 | 14 March 1889 (original site); 8 June 1902 (present site) | |
| Casino | CSI | Casino | North Coast Region | 803.9 | 22 September 1930 | |
| Coalcliff | CCF | Coalcliff | South Coast Line | 59.270 | 1 August 1920 | |
| Cockle Creek | CCK | Cockle Creek | Central Coast & Newcastle Line | 150.630 | 15 August 1887 | |
| Coffs Harbour | CFS | Coffs Harbour | North Coast Region | 607.810 | 30 August 1915 | |
| Coledale | COL | Coledale | South Coast Line | 66.230 | 1 July 1902 (original site); 5 September 1906 (second site); 27 October 1912 (present site) | |
| Condobolin | CBX | Condobolin | Western Region | 546.300 | 1896 | |
| Coniston | CNI | Coniston | South Coast Line | 84.100 | 1 April 1916 (original site); 1 November 1925 (reopen after closure on 29 April 1923); 20 May 1941 (present site) | |
| Coolamon | CLO | Coolamon | Southern Region | 509.5 | 28 August 1881 | |
| Cootamundra | CMD | Cootamundra | Southern Region | 429.650 | 1 November 1877 | |
| Corrimal | CIM | Corrimal | South Coast Line | 76.990 | 21 June 1887 | |
| Cowan | CWN | Cowan | Central Coast & Newcastle Line | 48.810 | 1890 (originally); 6 October 1901 (with platform) | |
| Cringila | CRG | Cringila | South Coast Line | 87.650 | 16 April 1926 | |
| Culcairn | CUL | Culcairn | Southern Region | 596 | 1 September 1880 | |
| Dapto | DAP | Dapto | South Coast Line | 95.050 | 9 January 1887 | |
| Darnick | DNK | Darnick | Western Region | 879.2 | 7 November 1927 | |
| Dora Creek | DRK | Dora Creek | Central Coast & Newcastle Line | 127.230 | 16 August 1889 | |
| Douglas Park | DPK | Douglas Park | Southern Highlands Line | 73.320 | 6 September 1869 (original site); 13 June 1892 (present site) | Douglass Park (1869–1891) |
| Dubbo | DBO | Dubbo | Western Region | 461.9 | 1 February 1881 | |
| Dungog | DGG | Dungog | North Coast Region | 245.200 | 14 August 1911 | |
| East Maitland | EAM | East Maitland | Hunter Line | 189.097 | 27 July 1858 (original site); 2 May 1864 (second site); 25 March 1879 (present site) | Morpeth Junction (1858–1879) |
| Euabalong West | EUB | Euabalong West | Western Region | 617.8 | 10 February 1919 | |
| Eungai | ENG | Eungai | North Coast Region | 534 | 1 July 1919 | |
| Exeter | EXT | Exeter | Southern Highlands Line | 155.880 | 1878 | Badgery's Siding (1878–1890) |
| Fairy Meadow | FNW | Fairy Meadow | South Coast Line | 79.360 | 1887 | Cramsville (1887–1888); Para-Meadow (1888–1909); Balgownie (1909–1956) |
| Fassifern | FSN | Fassifern | North Coast Region North Western Region | 142.310 | 1888 (originally); 5 May 1891 (with platform) | |
| Faulconbridge | FLB | Falconbridge | Blue Mountains Line | 82.960 | 15 March 1877 | |
| Gerringong | GOG | Gerringong | South Coast Line | 128.560 | 2 June 1893 | |
| Geurie | GUI | | Western Region | 434.50 | 1885 | Ponto (1885–1889) |
| Glenbrook | GBR | Glenbrook | Blue Mountains Line | 67.090 (present) | 11 July 1867 (original station); 11 May 1913 (present station) | Watertank (1867–1874); Wascoes Siding (1874–1878); Brookdale (1878–1879) |
| Gloucester | GCR | Gloucester | North Coast Region | 309.30 | 5 February 1913 | |
| Gosford | GOS | Gosford | North Coast Region North Western Region | 80.910 | 15 August 1887 | |
| Goulburn | GUL | Goulburn | Southern Region | 224.900 | 19 May 1869 | |
| Grafton | GFN | Grafton | North Coast Region | 695.70 | 12 October 1915 | |
| Greta | GTA | Greta | Hunter Line | 210.800 | 6 September 1869 | Farthing (1869–1878) |
| Griffith | GFF | Griffith | Southern Region | 640.38 | 3 July 1916 | |
| Gunnedah | GUH | Gunnedah | North Western Region | 475.80 | 11 September 1879 | |
| Gunning | GNI | Gunning | Southern Region | 278.60 | 9 November 1875 | |
| Hamilton | HAM | Hamilton | Central Coast & Newcastle Line Hunter Line | 164.630 | 1872 | |
| Harden | HRD | Harden | Southern Region | 385.40 | 12 March 1877 | Murrumburrah (1877–1878); North Murrumburrah (1878–1880) |
| Hawkesbury River | HKR | Hawkesbury River | Central Coast & Newcastle Line | 57.400 | 1870 | Peats Ferry (1870–1888); Brooklyn (1888–1889); Hawkesbury River (1889–1890); Hawkesbury (1890–1906) |
| Hazelbrook | HZK | Hazelbrook | Blue Mountains Line | 93.470 | 1884 | |
| Helensburgh | HSB | Helensburgh | South Coast Line | 46.380 | 1 January 1889 (original site); 30 May 1915 (present site) | |
| Henty | HTY | Henty | Southern Region | 580.29 | 1880 (original station); 1904 (present station) | Doodle Cooma (1880–1891) |
| Hexham | HXM | Hexham | Hunter Line | 175.530 | 1 August 1871 | |
| High Street | HGH | High Street | Hunter Line | 191.410 | 27 May 1856 | |
| Hilldale | | Hilldale | Hunter Line | 226.400 | 14 August 1911 | |
| Ivanhoe | IVN | Ivanhoe | Western Region | 816.40 | 19 August 1925 | |
| Junee | JUE | Junee | Southern Region | 485.67 | 6 July 1878 | Junee Junction (1881–1940) |
| Katoomba | KTO | Katoomba | Western Region | 109.940 | 2 February 1874 | Crushers (1874–1877) |
| Kembla Grange | KGG | Kembla | South Coast Line | 91.590 | 1 January 1890 | |
| Kempsey | KPS | Kempsey | North Coast Region | 503.65 | 3 December 1917 | |
| Kendall | KDL | Kendall | North Coast Region | 433.30 | 12 April 1915 | |
| Kiama | KAM | Kiama | South Coast Line | 119.160 | 2 June 1893 | |
| Koolewong | KWG | Koolewong | Central Coast & Newcastle Line | 74.820 | 29 November 1920 | |
| Kootingal | KNG | Kootingal | North Western Region | 472.10 | 9 January 1882 | Moonbi (1882–1914) |
| Kotara | KRZ | Kotara | Central Coast & Newcastle Line | 158.920 | 12 November 1924 | |
| Kyogle | KYO | | North Coast Region | 833.80 | 25 June 1910 | |
| Lapstone | LAP | Lapstone | Blue Mountains Line | 63.620 | 24 February 1964 | |
| Lawson | LWN | Lawson | Blue Mountains Line | 96.040 | 11 July 1867 | Blue Mountain (1867–1879) |
| Leeton | LEE | Leeton | Southern Region | 612.64 | 6 March 1922 | |
| Leura | LEU | Leura | Blue Mountains Line | 107.590 | 6 December 1890 | |
| Linden | LND | Linden | Blue Mountains Line | 86.810 | August 1874 (as tank stop); 26 October 1874 (with platform) | Linden Tank (1874); Henderson's Platform (1874–1879) |
| Lisarow | LRW | Lisarow | Central Coast & Newcastle Line | 87.730 | 31 October 1892 | Jenkins Siding (1892–1902); Wyoming (1902) |
| Lithgow | LTH | Lithgow | Blue Mountains Line | 155.780 | June 1877 (original site); 9 March 1855 (present site) | |
| Lochinvar | LVR | Lochinvar | Hunter Line | 202.600 | 2 July 1860 | |
| Lysaghts | | Lysaghts | South Coast Line | 86.270 | 30 May 1938 | |
| Macksville | MXV | | North Coast Region | 552.4 | 1 July 1919 | |
| Maitland | MTL | Maitland | North Coast Region North Western Region | 192.550 | 1880 | West Maitland (1880–1949) |
| Martins Creek | MCR | Martins Creek | Hunter Line | 218.500 | 14 August 1911 | |
| Marulan | MRX | Marulan | Southern Highlands Line | 192.910 | 6 August 1868 | |
| Medlow Bath | MED | Medlow Bath | Blue Mountains Line | 115.800 | 21 January 1880 | Browns Siding Pulpit Hill (1880–1883); Medlow (1883–1903) |
| Melbourne (Southern Cross) | SSS | Southern Cross | Southern Region 28 non-NSW TrainLink services: Alamein line V/Line Albury line V/Line Ararat line V/Line Ballarat line Belgrave line V/Line Bendigo line Craigieburn line Cranbourne line V/Line Echuca line Flemington Racecourse line Frankston line V/Line Geelong line V/Line Gippsland line Glen Waverley line Hurstbridge line Lilydale line V/Line Maryborough line Mernda line Pakenham line V/Line Seymour line V/Line Shepparton line Sunbury line V/Line Swan Hill line The Overland Upfield line V/Line Warrnambool line Werribee line Williamstown line | 928 | 17 January 1859 | |
| Menangle | MGE | Menangle | Southern Highlands Line | 65.330 | 1 July 1863 | |
| Menangle Park | MEK | Menangle Park | Southern Highlands Line | 62.850 | 26 September 1937 | |
| Menindee | MND | Menindee | Western Region | 1006.60 | 15 July 1919 | |
| Metford | | Metford | Hunter Line | 185.120 | 17 March 1995 | |
| Millthorpe | MIP | Millthorpe | Western Region | 302.60 | 19 April 1877 | |
| Mindaribba | MNB | Mindaribba | Hunter Line | 218.500 | 14 August 1911 | Dunmore (1911–1912) |
| Minnamurra | MUR | Minnamurra | South Coast Line | 113.370 | 23 December 1891 (original site); 10 October 1943 (present site) | |
| Mittagong | MIT | Mittagong | Southern Region | 131.570 | 1 March 1867 | |
| Moree | MRZ | Moree | North Western Region | 665.60 | 1 April 1897 (original site); 1904 (present site) | |
| Morisset | MOI | Morisset | Central Coast & Newcastle Line | 123.330 | 15 August 1888 | Morrisset (1888–1889) |
| Moss Vale | MSV | Moss Vale | Southern Region | 145.710 | 2 December 1867 | Sutton Forest (1867–1877) |
| Mount Victoria | MVR | Mount Victoria | Blue Mountains Line | 126.720 | 6 September 1869 | |
| Murrurundi | MDI | Murrurundi | North Western Region | 352.30 | 4 April 1872 | |
| Muswellbrook | MBK | Muswellbrook | North Western Region | 288.800 | 19 May 1869 | Musclebrook (1869–1890) |
| Nambucca Heads | NBH | Nambucca Heads | North Coast Region | 565.10 | 3 December 1923 | Nambucca Heads (original), Nambucca (1925–1964) |
| Narara | NRR | Narara | Central Coast & Newcastle Line | 84.600 | 15 August 1887 | |
| Narrabri | NAA | Narrabri | North Western Region | 569.20 | 1 April 1897 | |
| Narrandera | NRA | Narrandera | Southern Region | 583.48 | 28 February 1881 | |
| Newcastle Interchange | | Newcastle Interchange | Central Coast & Newcastle Line Hunter Line | 165.60 | 15 October 2017 | |
| Niagara Park | NIA | Niagara Park | Central Coast & Newcastle Line | 86.190 | October 1902 | Tundula (1902) |
| North Wollongong | NHW | North Wollongong | South Coast Line | 81.320 | 19 July 1915 | |
| Oak Flats | OAF | Oat Flat | South Coast Line | 105.130 | 1 January 1890 (originally); 9 March 1925 (with platform); 21 February 2003 (present site) | |
| Orange | OAG | Orange | Western Region | 322.6 | 19 April 1877 | |
| Otford | OTF | Otford | South Coast Line | 52.639 | 3 October 1888 | |
| Ourimbah | OUR | Ourimbah | Central Coast & Newcastle Line | 90.610 | 15 August 1887 | |
| Parkes | PKE | Parkes | Western Region | 445.5 | 18 December 1893 | |
| Paterson | PTR | Paterson | Hunter Line | 213.200 | 14 August 1911 | |
| Penrose | PRS | Penrose | Southern Highlands Line | 171.400 | 1869 (as siding); 1 June 1871 (original site); 15 March 1916 (present site) | Cables Siding (1869–1871) |
| Picton | PIC | Picton | Southern Highlands Line | 85.250 | 1 July 1863 | |
| Point Clare | PCL | Point Clare | Central Coast & Newcastle Line | 78.050 | 28 June 1891 | |
| Port Kembla | PKM | Port Kembla | South Coast Line | 90.240 | 5 January 1920 | |
| Port Kembla North | PBN | Port Kembla North | South Coast Line | 88.770 | 9 March 1936 | |
| Queanbeyan | QBN | Queanbeyan | Southern Region | 321.46 | 8 September 1887 | |
| Quirindi | UIR | Quirindi | North Western Region | 392.7 | 13 August 1877 | |
| Rydal | RDL | Rydal | Western Region | 181.4 | 1 July 1870 | |
| Sandgate | SDG | Sandgate | Hunter Line | 170.510 | 1881 | |
| Sawtell | SWT | Sawtell | North Coast Region | 600.70 | 13 July 1925 | |
| Scarborough | SCB | Scarborough | South Coast Line | 62.530 | 21 June 1887 (original site); 15 August 1915 (present site) | Clifton (1887–1888); South Clifton (1888–1903); Scarborough (1903–1915); Clifton (1915–1916) |
| Scone | NSO | Scone | North Western Region | 314.660 | 17 April 1871 | |
| Seymour | SEY | Seymour | Southern Region 3 non-NSW TrainLink services: V/Line Albury line V/Line Seymour line V/Line Shepparton line | | 20 November 1872 | |
| Shellharbour Junction | | Shellharbour Junction | South Coast Line | 110.660 | 22 November 2014 | Dunmore (Shellharbour); 800 metres away, 9 November 1887 |
| Singleton | SIX | Singleton | North Western Region | 238.900 | 7 May 1863 | |
| Springwood | SPR | Springwood | Blue Mountains Line | 79.670 | 11 July 1867 | |
| Stanwell Park | SWP | Stanwell Park | South Coast Line | 55.950 | 14 March 1890 (original site); 10 October 1920 (present site) | |
| Stuart Town | SWN | Stuart Town | Western Region | 379.60 | 1 June 1880 | |
| Tahmoor | TAH | Tahmoor | Southern Highlands Line | 94.490 | 13 July 1919 | |
| Tallong | TJG | Tallong | Southern Highlands Line | 185.380 | 1869 (originally); 16 April 1878 (with platform) | Barbers Creek Tank (1869–1905) |
| Tamworth | TMW | Tamworth | North Western Region | 455.1 | 9 January 1882 | |
| Tarago | TGO | Tarago | Southern Region | 282.51 | 3 January 1884 | |
| Tarana | TNJ | Tarana | Western Region | 198.3 | 22 April 1872 | |
| Taree | TRO | Taree | North Coast Region | 378.60 | 5 February 1913 | |
| Tarro | TRJ | Tarro | Hunter Line | 178.180 | 5 April 1857 | Hexham (1857–1871); Hexham Township (1871) |
| Tascott | TSC | Tascott | Central Coast & Newcastle Line | 76.910 | October 1905 | |
| Telarah | TLR | Telarah | Hunter Line | 194.740 | 14 August 1911 | West Maitland Marshalling Yard (1911–1922) |
| Teralba | TBR | Teralba | Central Coast & Newcastle Line | 147.570 | 15 August 1887 | |
| The Rock | TRK | The Rock | Southern Region | 550.29 | 1 September 1880 | Hanging Rock (1880–1882); Kingston (1882–1883) |
| Thirroul | TRL | Thirroul | South Coast Line | 70.240 | 21 June 1887 | Robbinsville (1887–1891) |
| Thornton | THO | Thornton | Hunter Line | 182.190 | 1 August 1871 | Woodford (1871–1877) |
| Towradgi | TOW | Towradgi | South Coast Line | 78.020 | 18 December 1948 | |
| Tuggerah | TGG | Tuggerah | Central Coast & Newcastle Line | 98.540 | 1890 | Tuggerah Lakes (1890–1891); Tuggerah (1891–?); Tuggerah Lakes (?–1911) |
| Unanderra | UDR | Unanderra | South Coast Line | 88.270 | 9 November 1887 | |
| Uralla | URL | Uralla | North Western Region | 555.10 | 2 August 1882 | |
| Urunga | URA | Urunga | North Coast Region | 580.90 | 19 March 1923 | |
| Valley Heights | VHS | Valley Heights | Blue Mountains Line | 77.410 | May 1875 | Eagers Platform (1875–1877); The Valley (1877–1880) |
| Victoria Street | VST | Victoria Street | Hunter Line | 187.920 | 5 April 1857 | East Maitland (1857–1858) (closed) (1858–1877) |
| Wagga Wagga | WGA | Wagga Wagga | Southern Region | 521.40 | 1 September 1879 | |
| Walcha Road | WLC | Walcha Road | North Western Region | 517.9 | 2 August 1882 | |
| Wallarobba | WLB | Wallarobba | Hunter Line | 231.700 | 14 August 1911 | |
| Wangaratta | WAG | Wangaratta | Southern Region 1 non-NSW TrainLink service: V/Line Albury line | | 28 October 1873 | |
| Warabrook | WBK | Warabrook | Hunter Line | 168.690 | 23 October 1995 | |
| Waratah | WTH | Waratah | Hunter Line | 165.970 | 9 March 1858 | |
| Warnervale | WNV | Warnervale | Central Coast & Newcastle Line | 105.900 | 2 September 1907 (originally); 17 October 1910 (with platform) | |
| Warrimoo | WRM | Warrimoo | Blue Mountains Line | 74.300 | 9 March 1918 | |
| Wauchope | WAU | Wauchope | North Coast Region | 455.00 | 12 April 1915 | |
| Wellington | WEL | Wellington | Western Region | 410.40 | 1 June 1880 | |
| Wentworth Falls | WFS | Wentworth Fall | Blue Mountains Line | 102.610 | 22 July 1867 | Weatherboard (1867–1879) |
| Werris Creek | WCK | Werris Creek | North Western Region | 410.7 | 1880 | |
| Wingello | WNE | Wingello | Southern Highlands Line | 177.140 | 1 June 1871 (as siding); 1882 (as station) | Unnamed (1871–1895) |
| Wingham | WGM | Wingham | North Coast Region | 367.10 | 5 February 1913 | |
| Willow Tree | WTE | Willow Tree | North Western Region | 375.70 | 13 August 1877 | Warrah (1877–1879) |
| Wirragulla | WGL | Wirragulla | Hunter Line | 238.000 | 14 August 1911 | |
| Wollongong | WOL | Wollongong | South Coast Line | 82.920 | 21 June 1887 | |
| Wombarra | WMJ | Wombarra | South Coast Line | 64.340 | 12 February 1917 | |
| Wondabyne | WDB | Wondabyne | Central Coast & Newcastle Line | 65.150 | 1 May 1889 (original site); April 1939 (present site) | Mullet Creek Junction (1889–1890); Hawkesbury Cabin (1890–1891) |
| Woodford | WFO | Woodford | Blue Mountains Line | 90.370 | 11 July 1868 | Buss's Platform (1868–1871) |
| Woonona | WOJ | Woonona | South Coast Line | 73.990 | 25 August 1919 | |
| Woy Woy | WOY | Woy Woy | Central Coast & Newcastle Line | 72.620 | 1 February 1889 (originally); 18 December 1891 (with platform) | |
| Wyee | WYE | Wyee | Central Coast & Newcastle Line | 114.860 | 1 August 1892 (originally); February 1896 (with platform) | |
| Wyong | WYG | Wyong | Central Coast & Newcastle Line | 101.080 | 15 August 1887 | |
| Yass Junction | YAS | Yass Junction | Southern Region | 318.01 | 3 July 1876 | Yass (1876–1882) |
| Yerrinbool | YEB | Yerrinbool | Southern Highlands Line | 116.310 | 13 July 1919 | |
| Zig Zag | ZIG | Zig Zag | Blue Mountains Line | 150.940 | 15 April 1878 (originally); 1959 (after closure in 1910) | |

== See also ==
- List of Sydney Trains railway stations
- Transportation in Australia
- Lists of railway stations
