= List of NSW TrainLink train routes =

NSW TrainLink is the operator of country railway passenger services in the state of New South Wales, Australia. It operated, as at July 2015, ten routes taken over from CountryLink in July 2013. Until July 2024, operations previously included intercity routes which had been taken over from CityRail in July 2013, with the services now operated by Sydney Trains rolling stock.

== Routes ==
NSW TrainLink coach services are not included.

=== North Coast ===
==== Grafton XPT ====
(1 x Daily)

- Central
- Strathfield
- Hornsby
- Gosford
- Wyong
- Fassifern
- Broadmeadow
- Maitland
- Dungog
- Gloucester
- Wingham
- Taree
- Kendall
- Wauchope
- Kempsey
- Eungai
- Macksville
- Nambucca Heads
- Urunga
- Sawtell
- Coffs Harbour
- Grafton

==== Casino XPT ====
(1 x Daily)

- Central
- Strathfield
- Hornsby
- Gosford
- Wyong
- Fassifern
- Broadmeadow
- Maitland
- Dungog
- Gloucester
- Wingham
- Taree
- Kendall
- Wauchope
- Kempsey
- Eungai (northbound only)
- Macksville
- Nambucca Heads
- Urunga
- Sawtell
- Coffs Harbour
- Grafton
- Casino

==== Brisbane XPT ====
(1 x Daily)

- Central
- Strathfield
- Hornsby
- Gosford
- Wyong
- Fassifern
- Broadmeadow
- Maitland
- Dungog
- Gloucester
- Wingham
- Taree
- Kendall
- Wauchope
- Kempsey
- Eungai (southbound only)
- Macksville
- Nambucca Heads (southbound only)
- Urunga
- Sawtell
- Coffs Harbour
- Grafton
- Casino
- Kyogle
- (Brisbane Roma Street)

=== Southern ===
==== Canberra Xplorer ====
(3 x Daily)

- Central (Sydney)
- Campbelltown
- Mittagong
- Bowral
- Moss Vale
- Bundanoon
- Goulburn
- Tarago
- Bungendore
- Queanbeyan
- Canberra

==== Melbourne XPT ====
(2 x Daily)

- Central (Sydney)
- Campbelltown
- Moss Vale
- Goulburn
- Gunning
- Yass Junction
- Harden
- Cootamundra
- Junee
- Wagga Wagga
- The Rock
- Henty
- Culcairn
- Albury
- Wangaratta
- Benalla
- Seymour
- Broadmeadows
- Southern Cross (Melbourne)

==== Griffith Xplorer ====
(2 x Weekly – from Sydney Wednesdays and Saturdays; from Griffith Thursdays and Sundays)

- Central (Sydney)
- Campbelltown
- Moss Vale
- Goulburn
- Yass Junction
- Harden
- Cootamundra
- Junee
- Coolamon
- Narrandera
- Leeton
- Griffith

=== Western ===
==== Dubbo XPT ====
(1 x Daily)

- Central (Sydney)
- Strathfield
- Parramatta
- Blacktown
- Penrith
- Katoomba
- Lithgow
- Rydal
- Tarana
- Bathurst
- Blayney
- Millthorpe
- Orange
- Stuart Town
- Wellington
- Geurie
- Dubbo

==== Broken Hill Xplorer ====
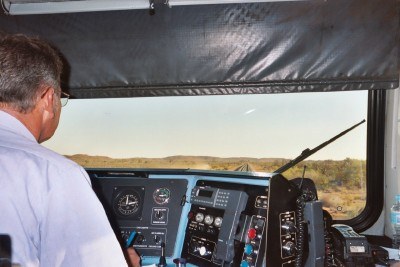
A view from inside the cab of the Outback Xplorer

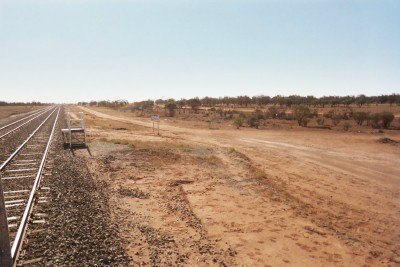
Darnick station. The station is only a small platform next to the tracks. The dirt road to the right is the region's major road.

(1 x Weekly – from Sydney Monday; from Broken Hill Tuesday)

- Central (Sydney)
- Strathfield
- Parramatta
- Penrith
- Katoomba
- Lithgow
- Bathurst
- Blayney
- Orange
- Parkes
- Condobolin
- Euabalong West
- Ivanhoe
- Darnick
- Menindee
- Broken Hill

=== North Western ===
==== Moree/Armidale Xplorer ====
(1 x Daily)

- Central (Sydney)
- Strathfield
- Hornsby
- Gosford
- Wyong
- Fassifern
- Broadmeadow
- Maitland
- Singleton
- Muswellbrook
- Scone
- Murrurundi
- Willow Tree
- Quirindi
- Werris Creek

to Armidale

- Tamworth
- Kootingal
- Walcha Road
- Uralla
- Armidale

to Moree

- Gunnedah
- Boggabri
- Narrabri
- Bellata
- Moree
