= Mid North Coast =

- Region
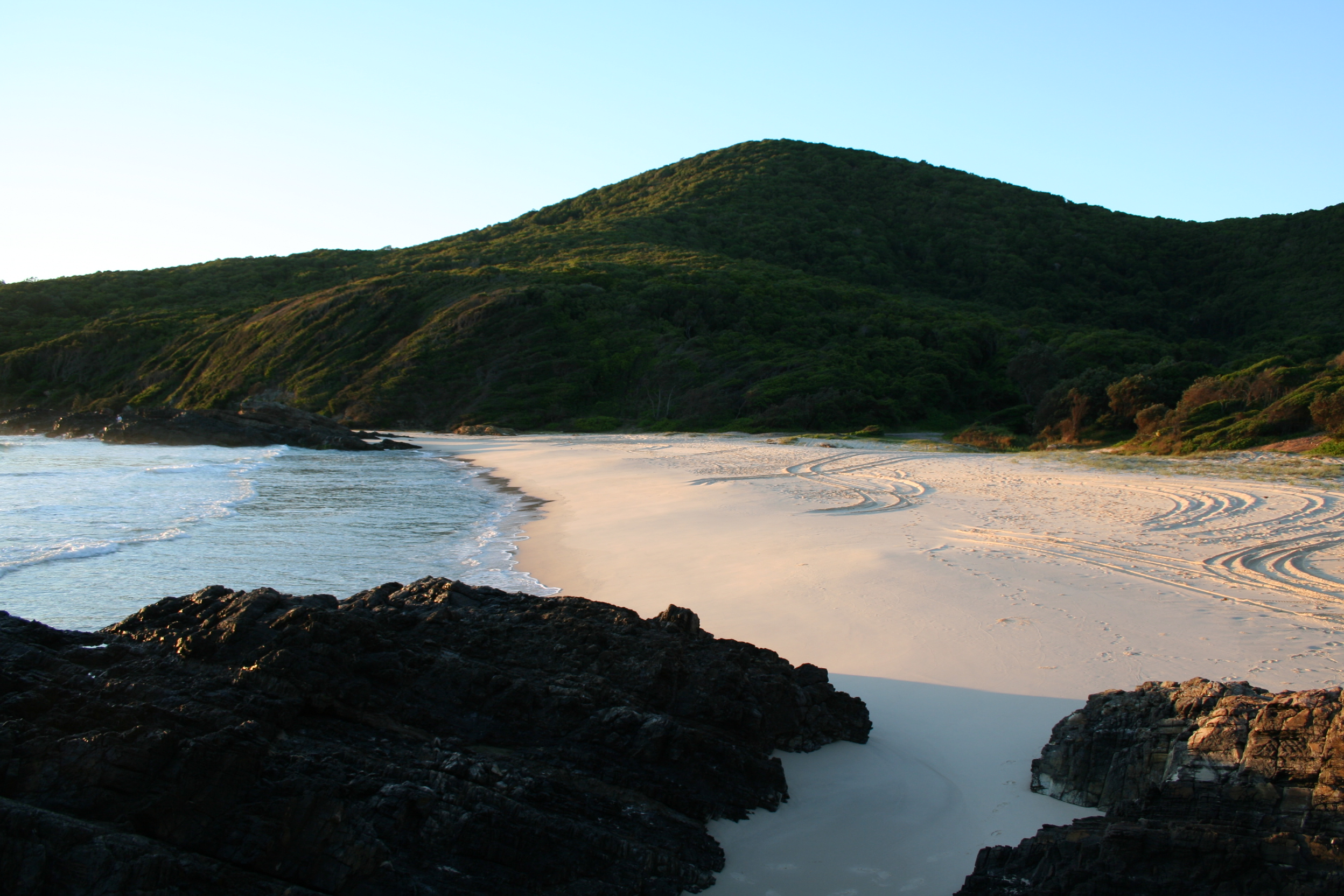
- McBrides Beach, Forster, New South Wales

- Coordinates: 31°16′S 152°54′E
- Country: Australia
- State: New South Wales
- LGA: Bellingen Shire; City of Coffs Harbour; Kempsey Shire; Mid-Coast Council; Nambucca Shire; Port Macquarie-Hastings Council

Government
  - State electorates: Myall Lakes; Port Macquarie; Oxley; Coffs Harbour
  - Federal divisions: Lyne; Cowper

Area
  - Total: 21,387 km^{2} (8,258 sq mi)

Population
  - Total: 308,372 (30 June 2016)
  - Density: 14.4187/km^{2} (37.3442/sq mi)
- Time zone: UTC+10 (AEST)
  - Summer (DST): UTC+11 (AEDT)
Regions around Mid North Coast
Northern Tablelands	Northern Rivers	Tasman Sea
New England	Mid North Coast	Tasman Sea
Upper Hunter	Hunter	Tasman Sea

The Mid North Coast is a country region in the north-east of the state of New South Wales, Australia. The region, situated 416km north of Sydney, covers the mid northern coast of the state, beginning from Port Stephens at Hawks Nest to as far north as Woolgoolga, near Coffs Harbour. The region has many beaches and subtropical national parks and forests as well as rural farmland and logging. Major coastal towns include Coffs Harbour, Forster and Port Macquarie. The Mid North Coast is a popular destination for camping or resorts and surfing, with coastal and hinterland tracks, with the unique heritage-listed mountain village of Bellbrook popular for day trips inland or 4wd campers and keen bass fishers.

Heading northwards beyond Newcastle, the Mid North Coast region's main towns include the towns of Bulahdelah, Forster, Tuncurry, Wingham, Taree, Port Macquarie, Kempsey, South West Rocks, Macksville, Nambucca Heads, Bellingen and Coffs Harbour. Of these Taree, Port Macquarie and Coffs Harbour are the major commercial centres, all with large shopping centres, public facilities and attractions. Kempsey and Forster-Tuncurry are considered semi-major commercial centres. Smaller towns that are popular tourist spots are Bellbrook, North Haven, South West Rocks, Urunga, Gloucester, Crescent Head, Hawks Nest, Woolgoolga, Old Bar, Lake Cathie and Pacific Palms.

The region has a subtropical climate and is known for its waterways, beaches and hinterland of forests and farms. Major industries are farming, logging and tourism.

== Demography and area ==
The following local government areas are contained within the region:

Population by Local Government Area
Mid North Coast rank	Local Government Area	Population 30 June 2016	10-year growth rate	Population density (people/km^{2})
1	Mid Coast Council	91,958	8.7	9.1
2	Port Macquarie-Hastings Council	79,905	14.2	21.7
3	Coffs Harbour City Council	74,641	12.0	63.6
4	Kempsey Shire Council	29,454	5.1	8.7
5	Nambucca Shire Council	19,521	6.7	13.1
6	Bellingen Shire Council	12,893	1.4	8.1
Mid North Coast		308,372	10.0	14.4

== Public transport ==
=== Bus ===
Many bus services run throughout the region. Providers include Buslines, Busways, Eggins, Ryans and Sawtell Coaches.

=== Rail ===
There are several railway stations on the Mid North Coast serviced by three trains; the Grafton, the Casino and the Brisbane XPT trains. Each run north and south once a day. Heading north from Sydney Central, the first station on the mid north coast is Gloucester followed by Wingham and Taree. Further north are Kendall, Wauchope (for Port Macquarie), Kempsey, Eungai, Macksville, Nambucca Heads, Urunga, Sawtell and Coffs Harbour. There is no station for Forster–Tuncurry.

=== Air ===
Port Macquarie Airport and Coffs Harbour Airport are the two main regional airports that provides daily direct domestic flights to Sydney, Brisbane, Melbourne, Canberra and Lord Howe Island.

== Politics ==
The Mid North Coast includes six local government areas: the City of Coffs Harbour, the Bellingen Shire, the Kempsey Shire, the Mid-Coast Council, the Nambucca Shire and the Port Macquarie-Hastings Council. It also includes four state electorates (Coffs Harbour, Myall Lakes, Oxley and Port Macquarie) and two federal electorates (Cowper and Lyne).

The region is conservative and is dominated by the Coalition in state and federal politics, particularly the National Party. Of the two federal electorates, Cowper has only been held by Labor once (for one term) and Lyne has never been held by Labor (although was held by an independent for five years). In state politics, the Coalition safely holds all Mid North Coast electorates (the Nationals hold Coffs Harbour, Myall Lakes and Oxley while the Liberal Party holds Port Macquarie).

In the Australian Marriage Law Postal Survey, a 2017 plebiscite eventually legalising same-sex marriage in Australia, both of the federal Mid North Coast electorates recorded majorities for the "yes" vote, while in the 1999 Australian republic referendum and the 2023 Australian Indigenous Voice referendum, they both recorded majorities for the "no" vote.

== Media ==
=== Radio ===
Radio stations that broadcast to the region are:

- ABC Mid North Coast covering Port Macquarie and the whole region (part of ABC Local Radio)
- ABC Coffs Coast serving Coffs Harbour (part of ABC Local Radio)
- Triple M (commercial)
- Hit Network (commercial)
- Raw FM (narrowcast)
- 2WAY FM serving Wauchope and Port Macquarie (community)
- CHY FM serving Coffs Harbour (community)

=== Television ===
The region is served by these TV stations:

- ABC TV, ABC Kids, ABC Family, ABC Entertains, ABC News (public broadcaster)
- SBS, SBS Viceland, SBS Food, NITV, SBS World Movies, SBS WorldWatch (multicultural public and commercial broadcaster)
- Nine (NBN), 9Gem, 9Go!, 9Life and Extra (affiliate of the Nine Network, owned by WIN Corporation).
- Seven (formerly Prime7), 7two, 7mate, 7Bravo, 7flix, and Racing.com (owned and operated by the Seven Network).
- 10 (formerly WIN Television Northern NSW), 10 Drama, 10 Comedy (owned and operated by Network 10)
- News24 (owned by Australian News Channel and News Corp Australia)

Of the three main commercial networks:

- WIN Television airs NBN News, a regional half hour long program including opt-outs for the Mid North Coast, every night at 5:30pm. It is broadcast from studios in Newcastle with reporters based at a local newsroom in the city.
- The Seven Network (formerly Prime7) airs a half-hour local Seven News (formerly Prime7 News) bulletin for the North Coast at 6pm each weeknight. It is broadcast from studios in Canberra with reporters based at a local newsroom in the city.
- Network 10 (formerly WIN Television Northern NSW) airs short local news updates throughout the day, broadcast from its Wollongong studios, instead of its Hobart studios.

== See also ==
- Regions of New South Wales
