= Christmas Creek =

Coordinates: 31°00′S 152°45′E

Location
- Country: Australia
- State: New South Wales
- Region: NSW North Coast (IBRA), Mid North Coast
- Local government area: Kempsey

Physical characteristics
- Source: Roses Knob, Great Dividing Range
  - location: near Collombatti
  - elevation: 121 m (397 ft)
- Mouth: confluence with the Macleay River
  - location: at Frederickton
  - elevation: −4 m (−13 ft)
- Length: 38 km (24 mi)

Basin features
- River system: Macleay River catchment

The Christmas Creek, a perennial stream that is part of the Macleay River catchment, is located in the Mid North Coast region of New South Wales, Australia.

== Course and features ==
Christmas Creek rises below Roses Knob, about 6.4 kilometres (4.0 mi) east by north of the locality of Willawarrin, near Collombatti, within the Collombatti State Forest. The river flows generally south southeast before reaching its confluence with the Macleay River at Frederickton. The river descends 125 metres (410 ft) over its 38 kilometres (24 mi) course.

== See also ==
- Rivers of New South Wales
- List of rivers of New South Wales (A-K)
- List of rivers of Australia
