= Newee Creek, New South Wales =

Australian locality

Coordinates: 30°37′59″S 152°56′01″E

Newee Creek is a locality on the North Coast of New South Wales, Australia. The North Coast railway line passes through, and a station existed at the site between 1923 and 1974.

Preceding station	Former services	Following station
Nambucca Heads towards Brisbane	North Coast Line	Macksville towards Maitland
