= Jindalee =

Jindalee may refer to:

- Jindalee, New South Wales
- Jindalee, Queensland
- Jindalee, Western Australia
- Jindalee Operational Radar Network

== See also ==
- Jindalee Lady, 1990 film
