= Eungai =

Town in New South Wales, Australia

- Town
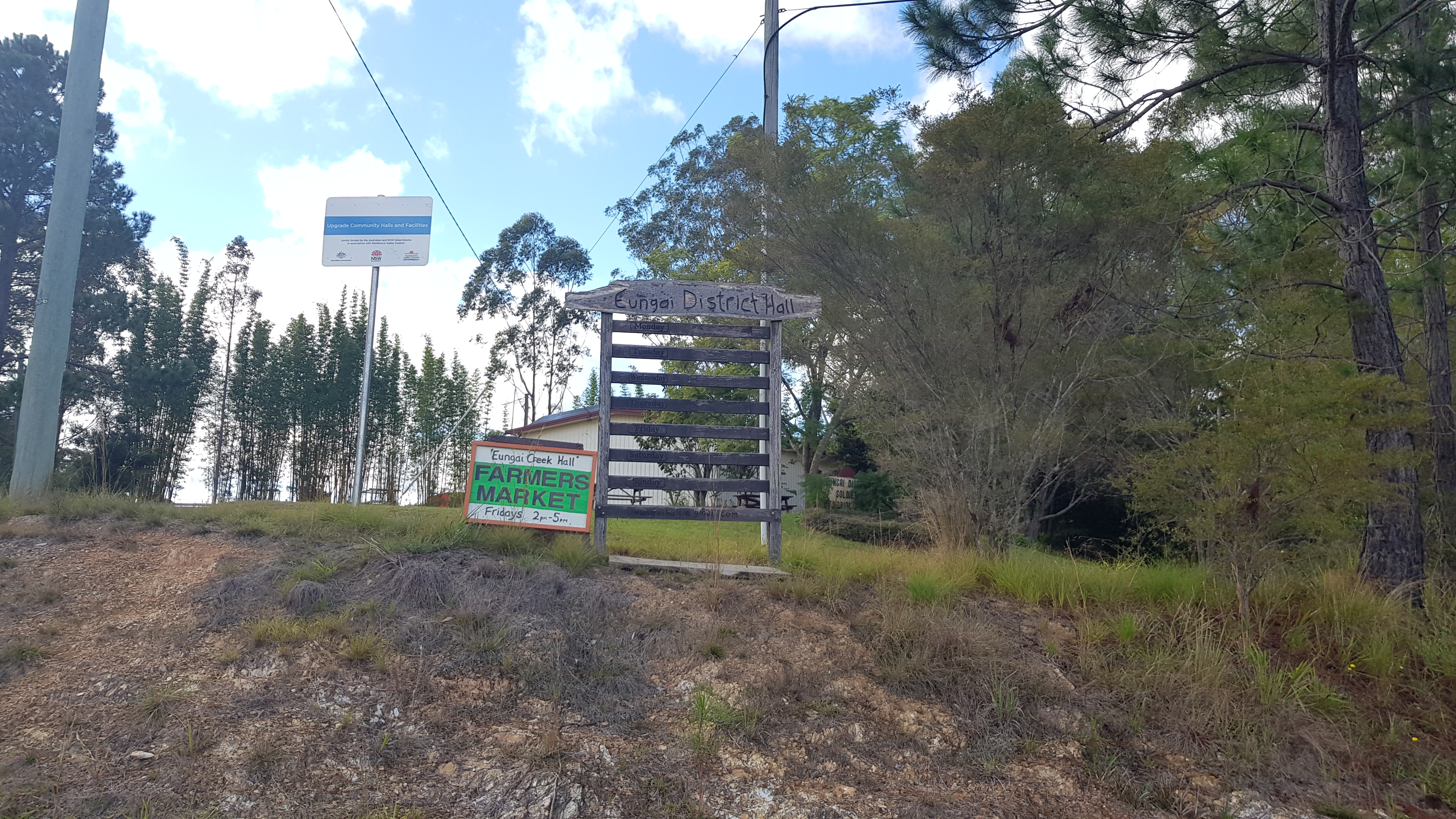
- Eungai District Hall, 2023

- Interactive map of Eungai
- Coordinates: 30.834°S 152.884°E
- Country: Australia
- State: New South Wales
- LGA: Nambucca Valley Council

Government
  - State electorate: Oxley
  - Federal division: Cowper

Population
  - Total: 605 (2021 census)
- Time zone: UTC+10 (AEST)
  - Summer (DST): UTC+11 (AEDT)
- Postcode: 2441

Eungai is a town on the mid North Coast of New South Wales, Australia. It is made up of two localities, Eungai Creek and Eungai Rail, although both have the same postcode. The Eungai district is midway between Sydney (500 km) and Brisbane, midway between Port Macquarie (90 km) and Coffs Harbour, and midway between Kempsey (20 km) and Macksville. It is in the Nambucca Valley Council area. It has a population of 605 as of the 2021 census.

== Railway Station ==
Eungai railway station is located on the North Coast railway line, and is served by the daily Sydney to Grafton XPT, Sydney to Casino XPT and the Grafton to Sydney XPT. Trains only stop at this station if there is a booking for pick up or set down.
