= Collombatti, New South Wales =

Locality in New South Wales, Australia

Coordinates: 30°56′55″S 152°45′04″E

Collombatti is a locality on the North Coast of New South Wales, Australia. The North Coast railway line passes through, and a station existed at the site between 1919 and 1974.

Preceding station	Former services	Following station
Eungai towards Brisbane	North Coast Line	Kempsey towards Maitland
