= Morrisons Hill railway station =

Former railway station in New South Wales, Australia

Morrisons Hill

General information
- Location: Morrisons Hill Road, Wallendbeen, New South Wales; Australia
- Coordinates: 34°32′02″S 148°06′37″E
- Operator: Public Transport Commission
- Line: Main Southern
- Distance: 413.097 kilometres from Central
- Platforms: 2 (2 side)
- Tracks: 2

Construction
- Structure type: Ground

Other information
- Status: Demolished

History
- Opened: 7 April 1902
- Closed: 9 March 1975
- Rebuilt: 1915

Services
Preceding station	Former services	Following station
Jindalee towards Albury	Main Southern Line	Wallendbeen towards Sydney
Location

Morrisons Hill railway station was a railway station on the Main Southern line, serving the locality of Morrisons Hill in Wallendbeen, New South Wales, Australia. The original station was opened in 1902, with a second site constructed when a new alignment was built in 1915. The station was served until its closure in 1975 and has now been demolished.
