= Urunga railway station =

Australian railway station

Urunga
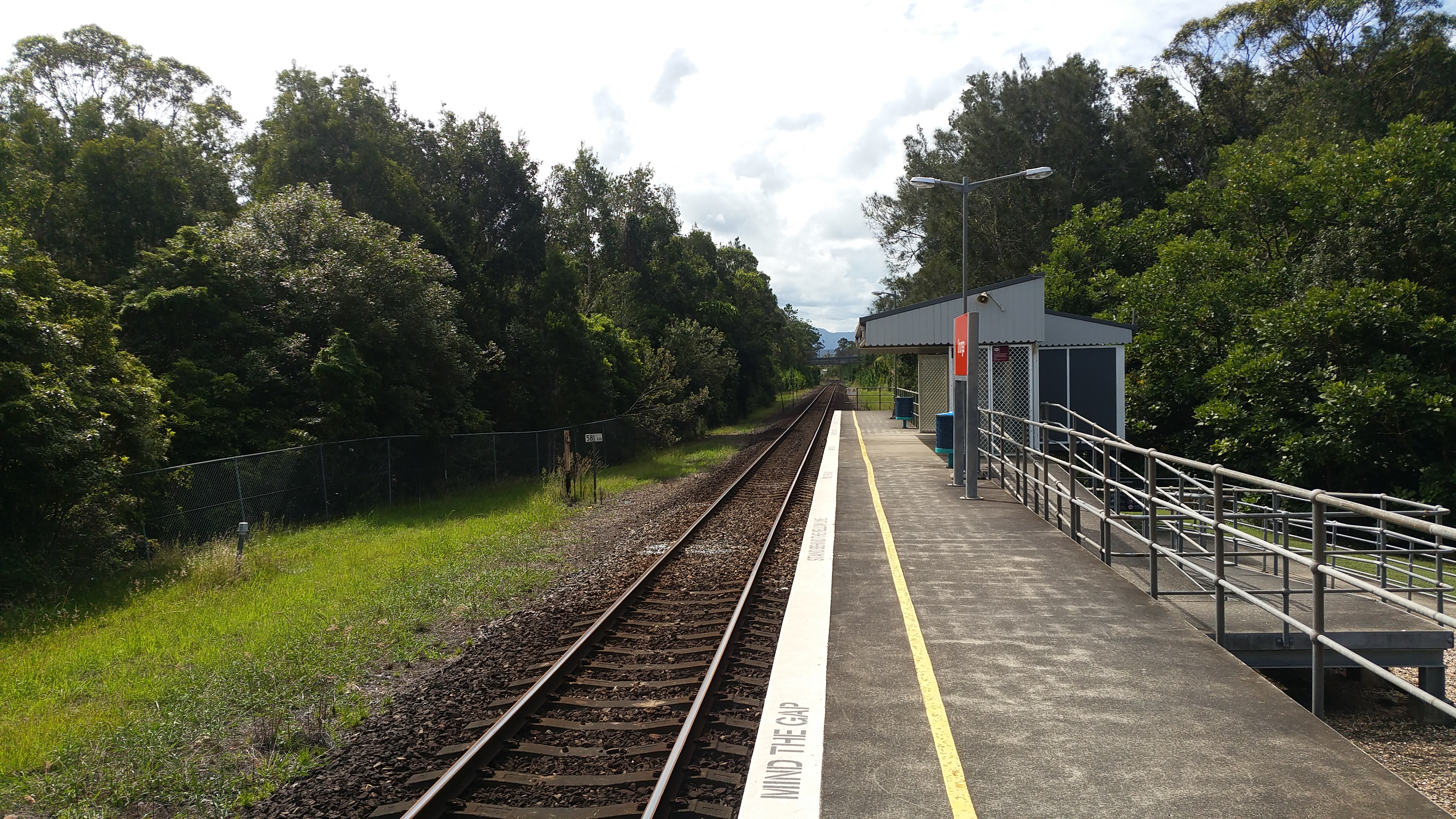
- Station platform, February 2019

General information
- Location: Orara Street, Urunga
- Coordinates: 30°29′59″S 153°01′07″E
- Elevation: 8 metres (26 ft)
- Owner: Transport Asset Manager of New South Wales
- Operator: NSW TrainLink
- Line: North Coast
- Distance: 580.90 km (360.95 mi) from Central
- Platforms: 1
- Tracks: 1

Construction
- Structure type: Ground
- Accessible: Yes

Other information
- Station code: URA

History
- Opened: 19 March 1923; 103 years ago

Services
Preceding station	NSW TrainLink	Following station
Sawtell towards Grafton, Casino or Brisbane	NSW TrainLink North Coast Line Except northbound Brisbane XPT	Nambucca Heads towards Sydney
Sawtell towards Grafton, Casino or Brisbane	NSW TrainLink North Coast Line Northbound Brisbane XPT	Macksville One-way operation
Location
- Location within New South Wales

Urunga railway station is located on the North Coast line in New South Wales, Australia. It serves the town of Urunga, opening on 19 March 1923.

== Platforms and services ==
Urunga has one platform. Each day northbound XPT services operate to Casino and Brisbane, with two southbound services operating to Sydney. This station is a request stop for the Casino and Brisbane XPTs, so these services stop here only if passengers booked to board/alight here.

Platform	Line	Stopping pattern	Notes
1	North Coast Region	services to Sydney Central, Casino & Brisbane	Casino & Brisbane XPTs request stop (booked passengers only)
