= Sawtell railway station =

Australian railway station

Sawtell
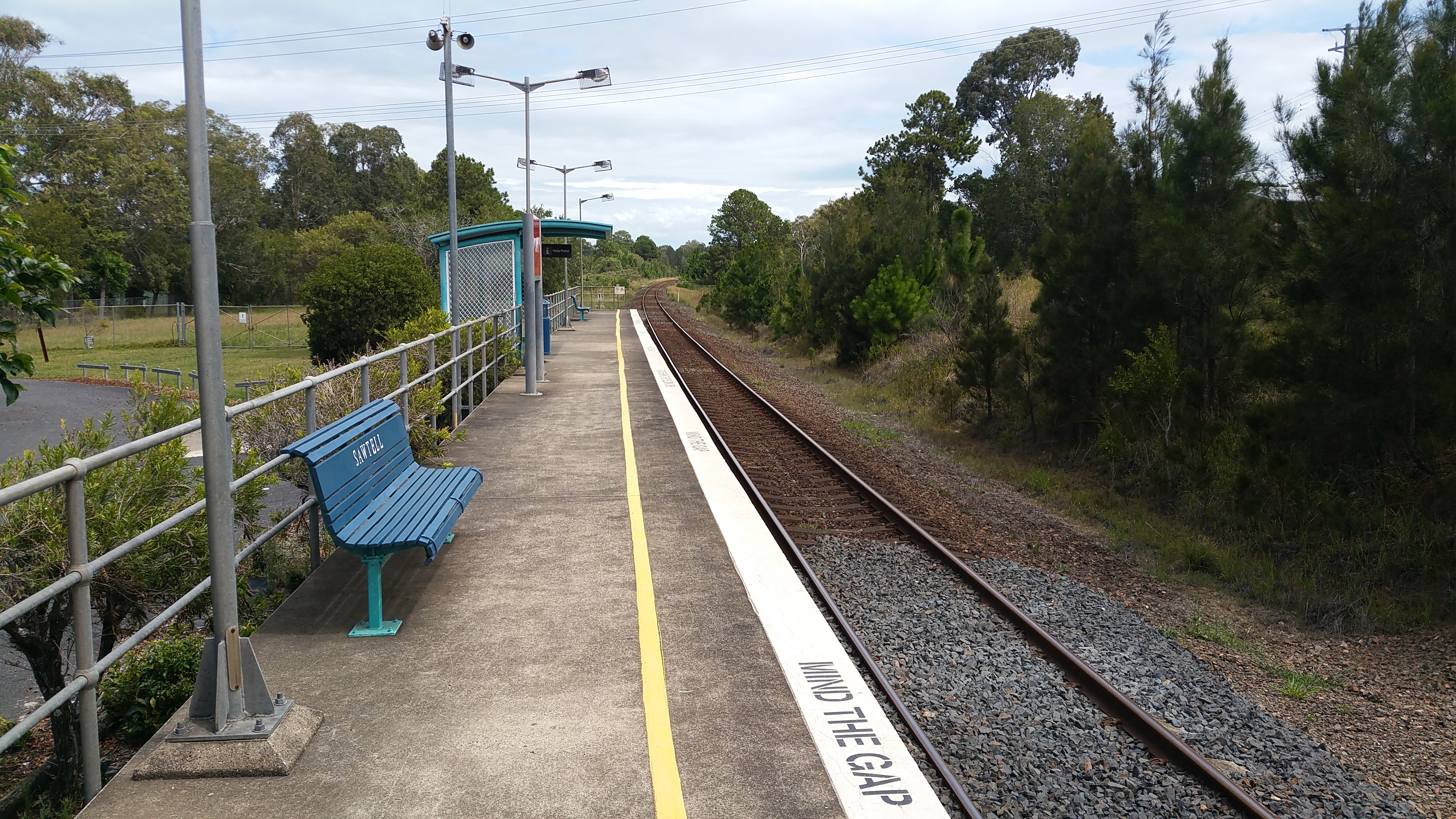
- Station platform, February 2019

General information
- Location: Seventeenth Avenue, Sawtell
- Coordinates: 30°21′28″S 153°05′55″E
- Elevation: 5 metres (16 ft)
- Owner: Transport Asset Manager of New South Wales
- Operator: NSW TrainLink
- Line: North Coast
- Distance: 600.70 km (373.26 mi) from Central
- Platforms: 1
- Tracks: 1

Construction
- Structure type: Ground
- Accessible: Yes

Other information
- Station code: SWT

History
- Opened: 13 July 1925; 101 years ago

Services
Preceding station	NSW TrainLink	Following station
Coffs Harbour towards Grafton, Casino or Brisbane	NSW TrainLink North Coast Line	Urunga towards Sydney
Location

Sawtell railway station is located on the North Coast line in New South Wales, Australia. It serves the town of Sawtell, opening on 13 July 1925.

== Platforms and services ==
Sawtell has one platform. Each day northbound XPT services operate to Casino and Brisbane, with two southbound services operating to Sydney. This station is a request stop, so the train stops only if passengers booked to board/alight here.

Platform	Line	Stopping pattern	Notes
1	North Coast Region	services to Sydney Central, Casino & Brisbane	request stop (booked passengers only)
