= Jindalee railway station =

Former railway station in New South Wales, Australia

Coordinates: 34°34′57″S 148°05′02″E

General information
- Location: Jindalee, New South Wales, Australia
- Line: Main Southern railway line

History
- Opened: 8 June 1896
- Closed: 20 May 1970

Services
Preceding station	Former services	Following station
Cootamundra towards Albury	Main Southern Line	Morrisons Hill towards Sydney
Location

Jindalee railway station was a railway station on the Main Southern line, serving the locality of Jindalee in the Riverina district of New South Wales, Australia. The station was opened between 1896 and 1970. The station and locality's name is derived from an Aboriginal word meaning 'bare hill'.

Preceding station	Former services	Following station
Cootamundra towards Albury	Main Southern Line	Morrisons Hill towards Sydney
