= Wauchope railway station =

Australian railway station

Wauchope
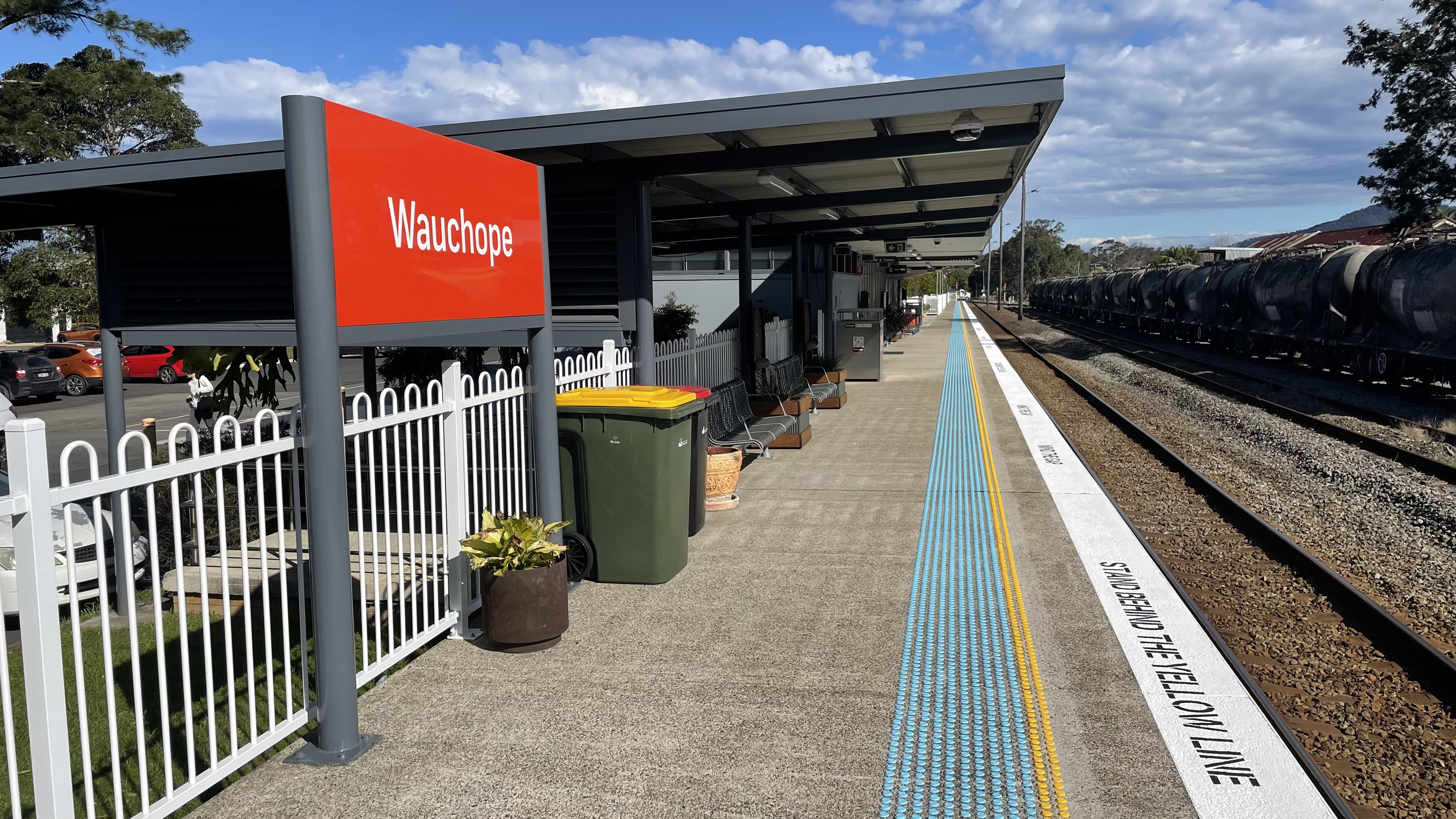
- Station platform, August 2022

General information
- Location: Randall Street, Wauchope
- Coordinates: 31°27′21″S 152°44′11″E
- System: Side platform
- Owner: Transport Asset Manager of New South Wales
- Operator: NSW TrainLink
- Line: North Coast
- Distance: 455.00 km (282.72 mi) from Central
- Platforms: 1

Construction
- Structure type: Ground
- Accessible: Yes

Other information
- Station code: WAU

History
- Opened: 12 April 1915; 111 years ago

Services
Preceding station	NSW TrainLink	Following station
Kempsey towards Grafton, Casino or Brisbane	NSW TrainLink North Coast Line	Kendall towards Sydney
Location

Wauchope railway station is located on the North Coast line, in New South Wales, Australia. It serves the town of Wauchope, opening on 12 April 1915 when the line was extended from Taree. It was the terminus of the line until it was extended to Kempsey on 3 December 1917. The present station building was erected in 1990.

== Platforms and services ==
Wauchope has one platform with a passing loop. Each day three northbound XPT services operate to Casino and Brisbane, and two southbound services operate to Sydney. It also serves the connecting bus services to Port Macquarie.

Platform	Line	Stopping pattern	Notes
1	North Coast Region	services to Sydney, Casino & Brisbane	
