= Macksville railway station =

Australian railway station

Macksville
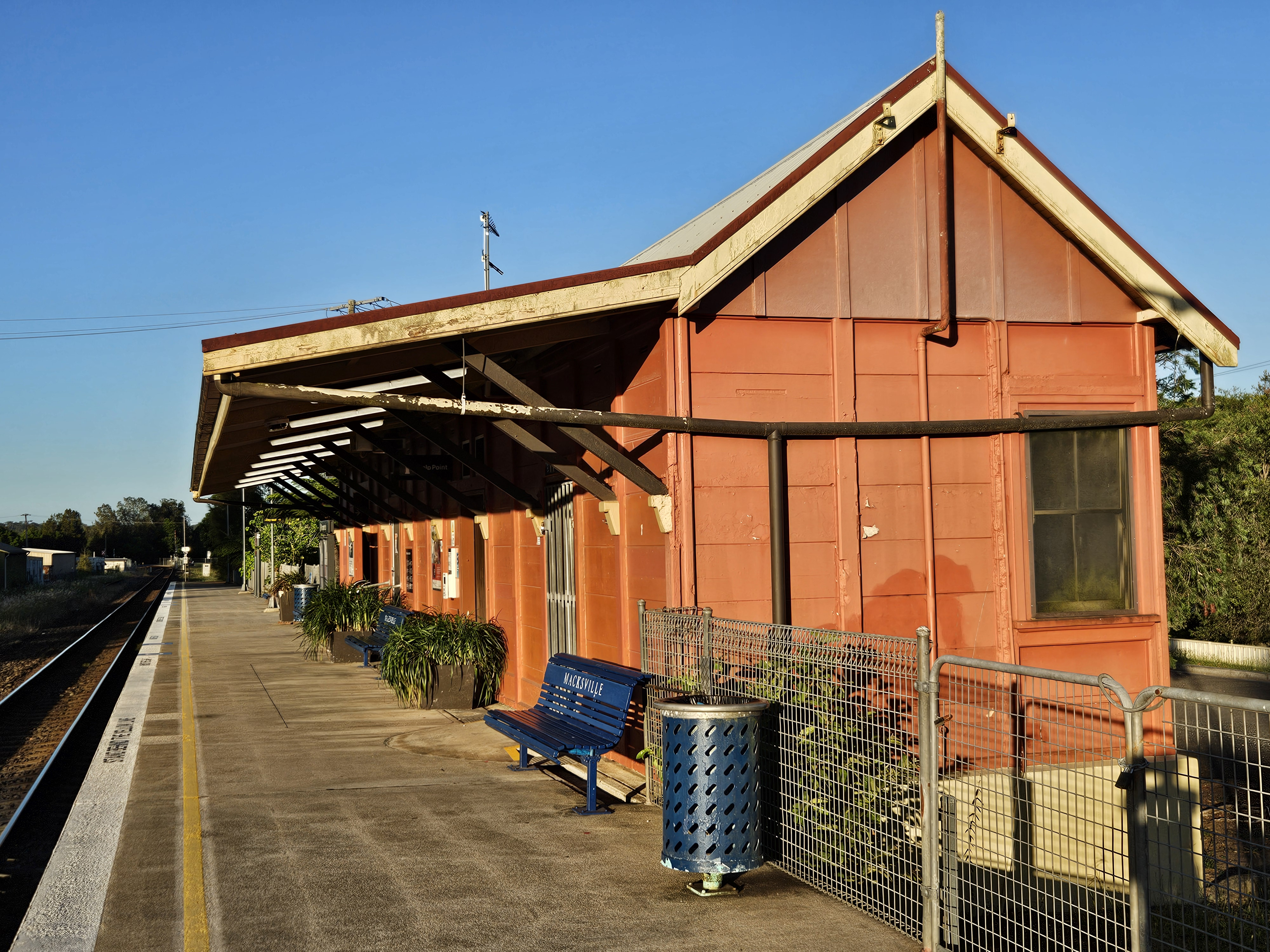
- Macksville Station building looking north

General information
- Location: Station Street, Macksville
- Coordinates: 30°42′33″S 152°54′47″E
- Elevation: 7 metres (23 ft)
- Owner: Transport Asset Manager of New South Wales
- Operator: NSW TrainLink
- Line: North Coast
- Distance: 552.4 km (343.2 mi) from Central
- Platforms: 1

Construction
- Structure type: Ground
- Accessible: Yes

Other information
- Station code: MXV

History
- Opened: 1 July 1919; 107 years ago

Services
Preceding station	NSW TrainLink	Following station
Nambucca Heads towards Grafton or Casino	NSW TrainLink North Coast Line Grafton & northbound Casino XPTs	Eungai towards Sydney
Nambucca Heads towards Grafton or Casino	NSW TrainLink North Coast Line Southbound Brisbane & Casino XPTs	Kempsey towards Sydney
Urunga towards Brisbane	NSW TrainLink North Coast Line Northbound Brisbane XPT	Kempsey One-way operation

New South Wales Heritage Register
- Official name: Macksville Railway Station group
- Type: State heritage (complex / group)
- Designated: 2 April 1999
- Reference no.: 1184
- Type: Railway Platform/Station
- Category: Transport – Rail
Location

Macksville railway station is a heritage-listed railway station located on the North Coast line in Macksville, New South Wales, Australia. The station serves the town of Macksville, and opened on 1 July 1919 when the line was extended from Kempsey. The heritage listing refers to the Macksville Railway Station group. The property was added to the New South Wales State Heritage Register on 2 April 1999.

== Platforms and services ==
Macksville has one platform. Each day northbound XPT services operate to Grafton, Casino and Brisbane, with three southbound services operating to Sydney. There is a connecting bus service to Nambucca Heads. This station is a request stop for the northbound Brisbane XPT and the southbound Casino XPT, so these services stop here only if passengers have booked to board/alight here. A goods yard and passing loop were formerly opposite the station, until disconnected in June 2012.

Platform	Line	Stopping pattern	Notes
1	North Coast Region	services to Sydney Central, Grafton, Casino & Brisbane	request stop for these services: northbound Brisbane XPT & southbound Casino XPT (booked passengers only)

== Description ==
The complex comprises a type 11 station building, completed in 1919; and concrete and steel platform faces, also completed in 1919.

== Heritage listing ==
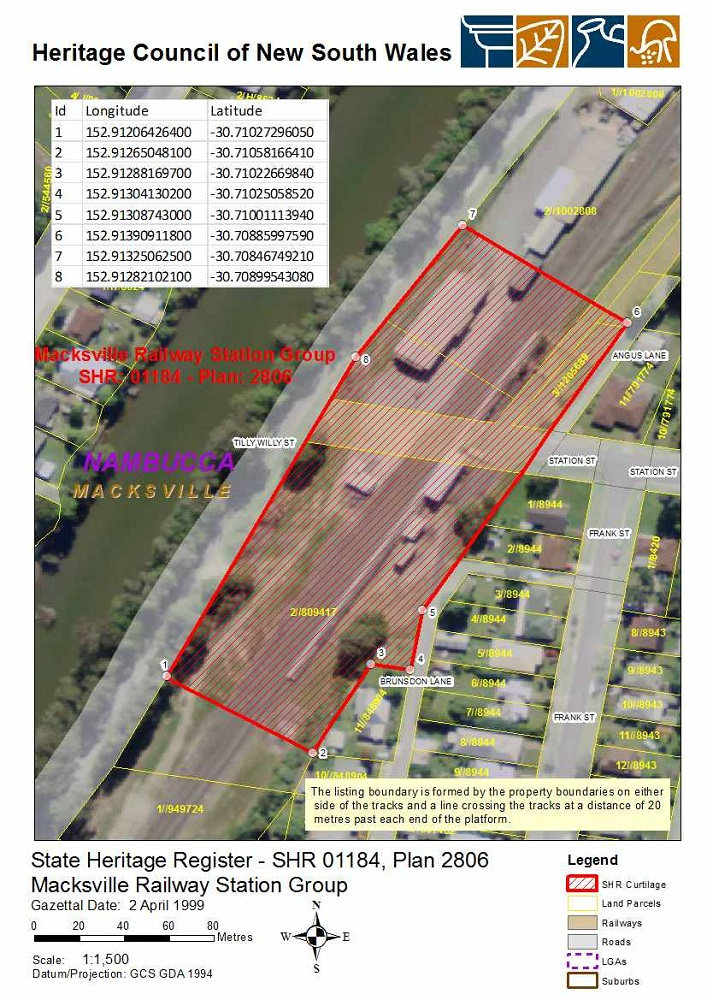
Heritage boundaries

Macksville is a modest site with a timber station building. It is typical of many small stations throughout the State and is a very good representative example of a north coast line station building and site.

Macksville railway station was listed on the New South Wales State Heritage Register on 2 April 1999 having satisfied the following criteria.

The place possesses uncommon, rare or endangered aspects of the cultural or natural history of New South Wales.

This item is assessed as historically rare. This item is assessed as architecturally rare. This item is assessed as socially rare.

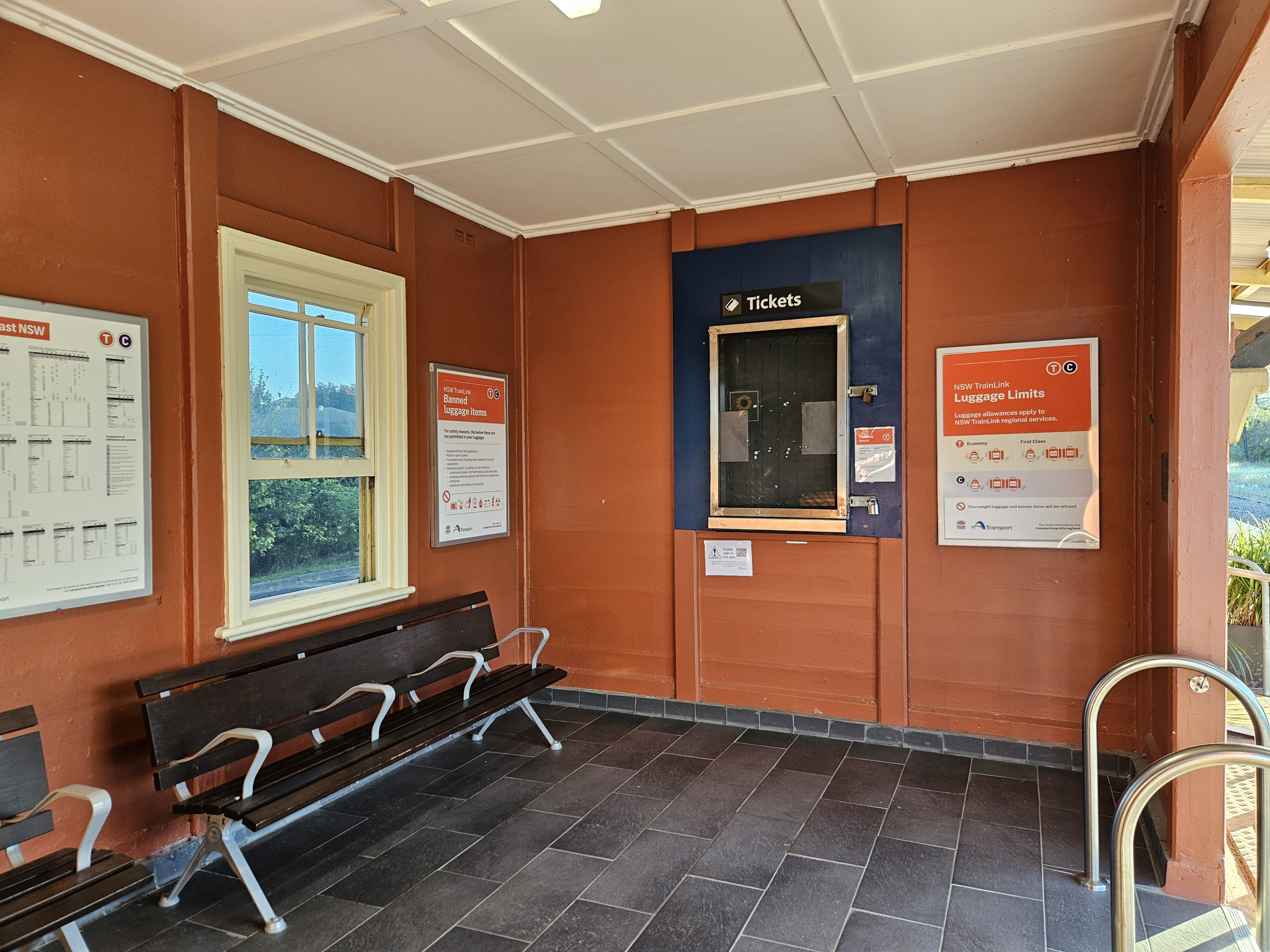
Macksville Station ticketing and waiting area
