= Nambucca Heads railway station =

Australian railway station

Nambucca Heads
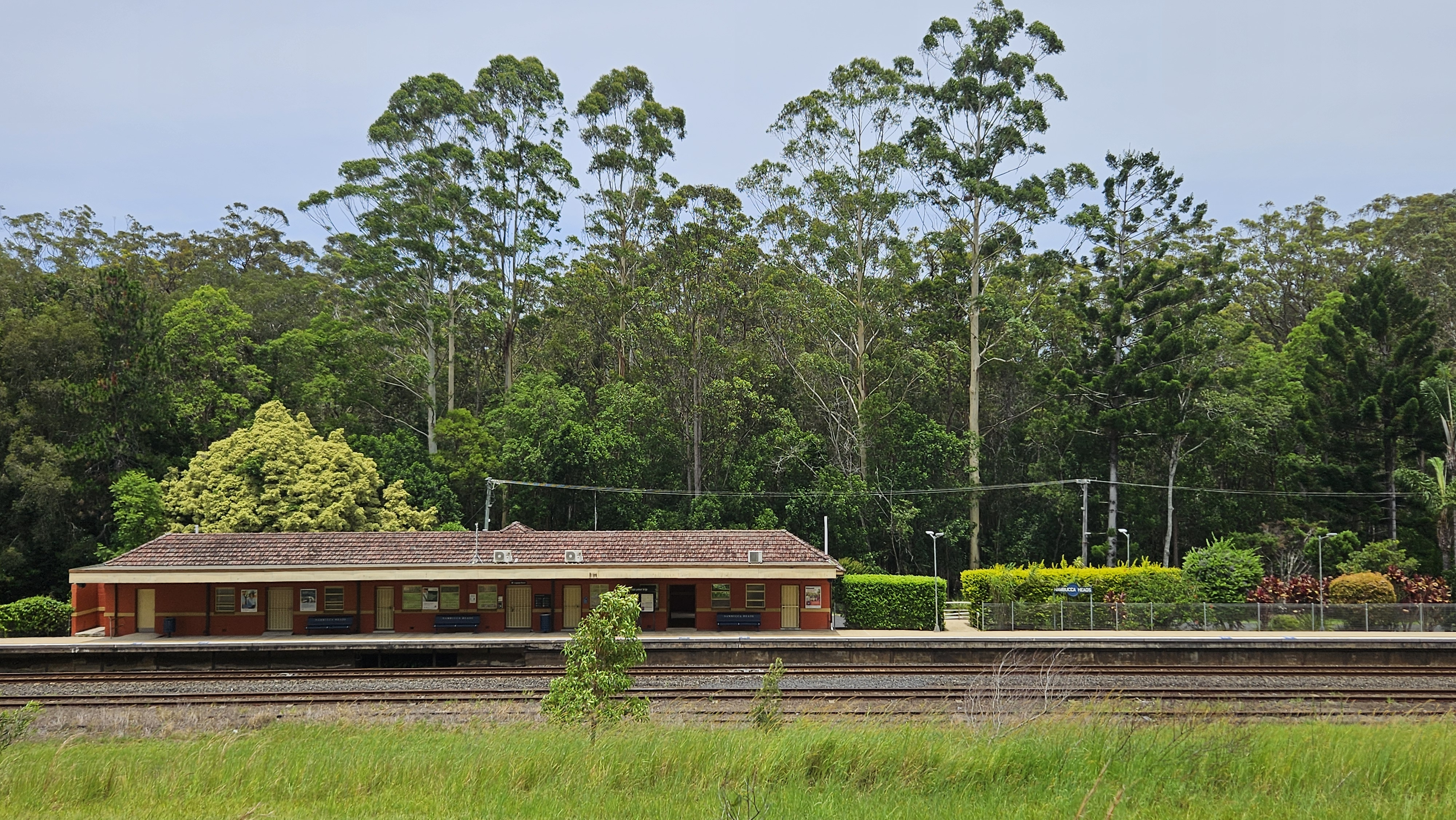
- Station platform and building, January 2024

General information
- Location: Railway Road, Nambucca Heads
- Coordinates: 30°37′45″S 152°58′39″E
- Elevation: 15 metres (49 ft)
- Owner: Transport Asset Manager of New South Wales
- Operator: NSW TrainLink
- Line: North Coast
- Distance: 565.10 km (351.14 mi) from Central
- Platforms: 1

Construction
- Structure type: Ground
- Accessible: Yes

Other information
- Status: Weekdays: Staffed: 11am to 1pm, 2pm to 4pm, 7.30pm to 9.30pm, 10pm to 12 midnight: Weekends and public holidays: Unstaffed
- Station code: NBH

History
- Opened: 3 December 1923; 102 years ago
- Former names: Nambucca (1925–1964)

Services
Preceding station	NSW TrainLink	Following station
Urunga towards Grafton or Casino	NSW TrainLink North Coast Line Except northbound Brisbane XPT	Macksville towards Sydney
Location

Nambucca Heads railway station is located on the North Coast line in New South Wales, Australia. It is about 3 kilometres (1.9 mi) from the centre of the town of Nambucca Heads. It opened on 3 December 1923 as Nambucca Heads. It was renamed Nambucca in October 1925, before resuming Nambucca Heads on 21 June 1964.

== Platforms and services ==
Nambucca Heads has one platform. Each day northbound XPT services operate to Grafton and Casino, with three southbound services operating to Sydney including the Brisbane XPT. This station is a request stop for the southbound Casino XPT, so this service stops here only if passengers booked to board/alight here. The northbound Brisbane XPT passes through this station without stopping, to allow it to pass the southbound Casino XPT, but there is a connecting taxi service to Macksville for passengers wishing to board towards Brisbane and passengers can leave at Macksville and catch the connecting taxi to get to Nambucca Heads.

Platform	Line	Stopping pattern	Notes
1	North Coast Region	services to Sydney Central, Grafton & Casino	southbound Casino XPT request stop (booked passengers only)
