= NSW TrainLink =

Operator of passenger rail services in New South Wales

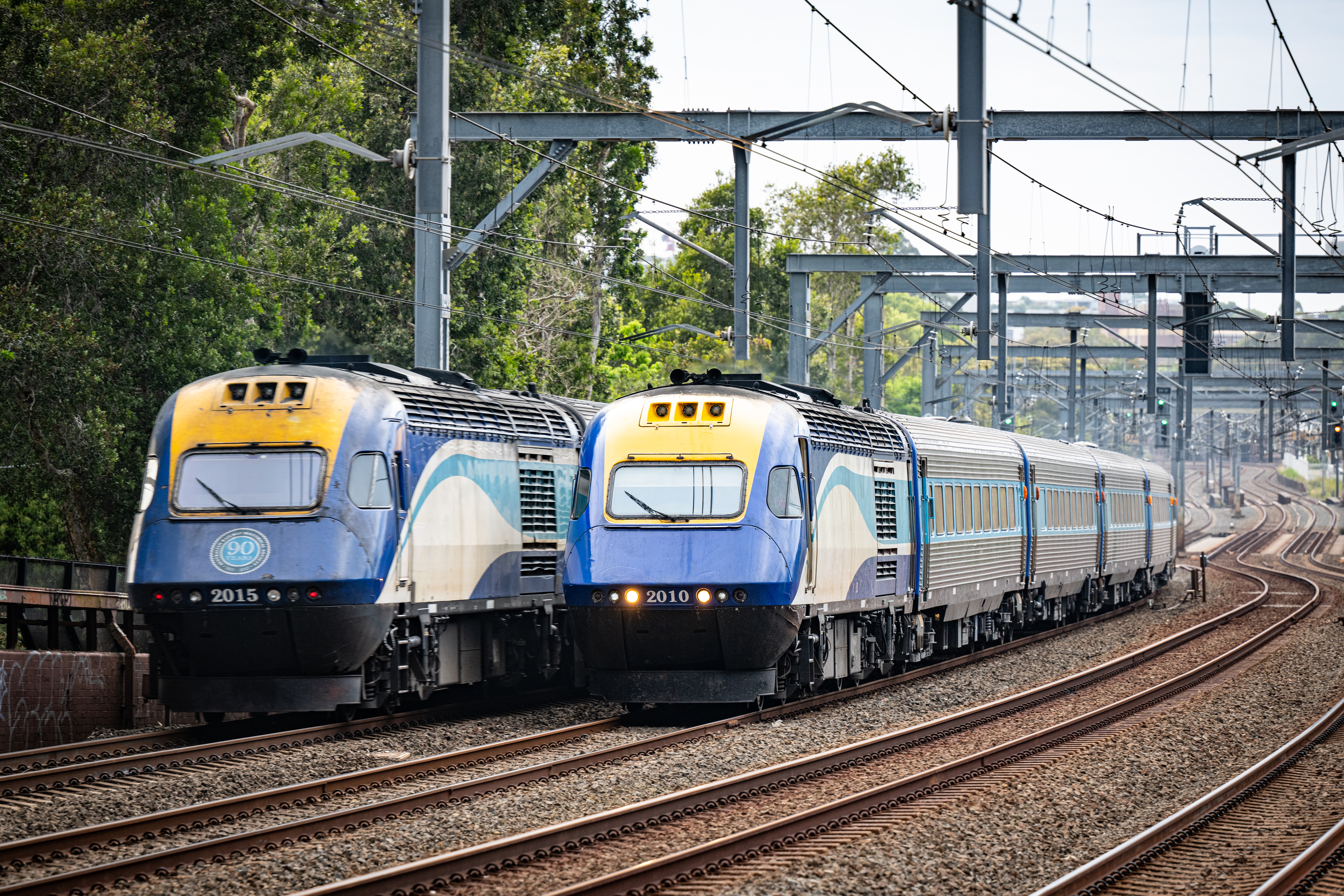
- Two XPTs in Sydney

- Roundel

Overview
- Owner: Transport for NSW
- Area served: New South Wales; Australian Capital Territory; Victoria; Queensland; South Australia
- Locale: New South Wales
- Transit type: Regional rail; Semi-high-speed rail; Coach
- Number of lines: 4
- Number of stations: 93 (Note: Not including coach stops.)
- Annual ridership: 35.3 million (2023/24)
- Chief executive: Roger Weeks
- Website: transportnsw.info/regional

Operation
- Began operation: 1 July 2013
- Operators: NSW Trains and private coach operators
- Rolling stock: Xplorer; XPT

Technical
- Track gauge: 1,435 mm (4 ft 8 1/2 in) standard gauge

NSW TrainLink is a regional train and coach operator in Australia, providing services throughout New South Wales and into the Australian Capital Territory, Victoria, Queensland and South Australia. Its primary services are spread across five major rail lines, operating out of Sydney.

NSW TrainLink was formed on 1 July 2013 when RailCorp was restructured and CountryLink was merged with the intercity services of CityRail.

Announced in May 2025, following extensive negotiations, it has been agreed that Sydney Trains and NSW TrainLink will become one entity during the life of the new three-year enterprise agreement pending membership approval.

== History ==
In May 2012, the then Minister for Transport, Gladys Berejiklian announced a restructure of RailCorp. On 1 July 2013, NSW TrainLink took over the operation of regional rail and coach services previously operated by CountryLink; non-metropolitan Sydney services previously operated by CityRail; and responsibility for the Main North railway line from Berowra to Newcastle, the Main Western railway line from Emu Plains to Bathurst, and the South Coast railway line from Waterfall to Bomaderry.

On 21 August 2023, it was announced that the majority of intercity passenger services, crew and stations would move from NSW TrainLink to Sydney Trains.

The process of transferring intercity services from NSW TrainLink to Sydney Trains began in 2023. From 1 July 2024, NSW TrainLink's Intercity services were transferred to Sydney Trains.

== Network ==
NSW TrainLink services operate in areas of lower population density, using a reserved seat ticketing system.

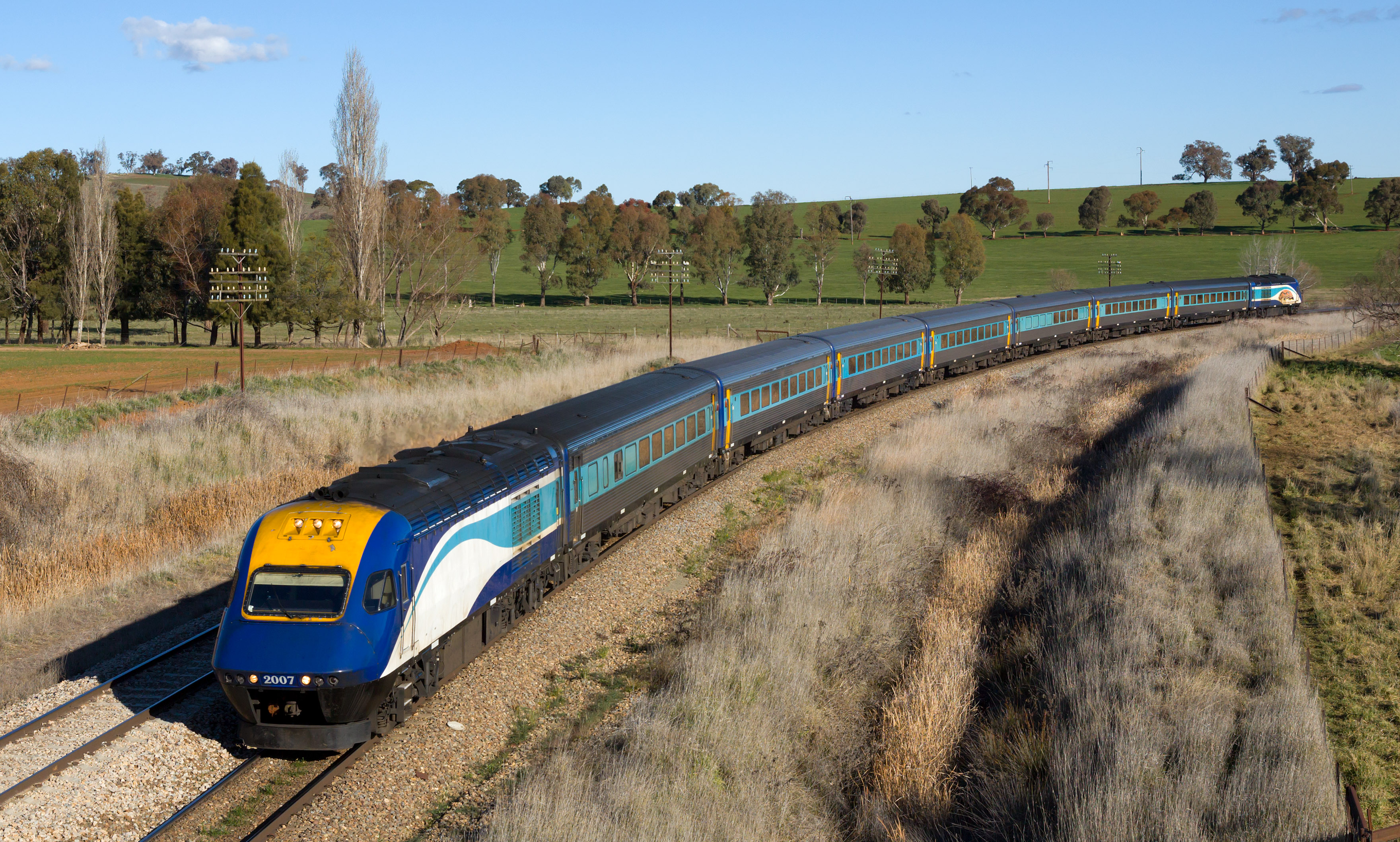
An XPT travelling from Melbourne to Sydney, pictured between Jindalee and Morrisons Hill, New South Wales

=== Train services ===
NSW TrainLink operates regional passenger services throughout New South Wales and interstate to Brisbane, Canberra and Melbourne. All rail services utilise diesel rolling stock. For more details of each train line see List of NSW TrainLink train routes.

Line colour and name	Between
North Coast Region	Central to Brisbane
North Western Region	Central to Armidale or Moree
Southern Region	Central to Canberra or Griffith or Melbourne
Western Region	Central to Broken Hill or Dubbo

==== North Coast ====
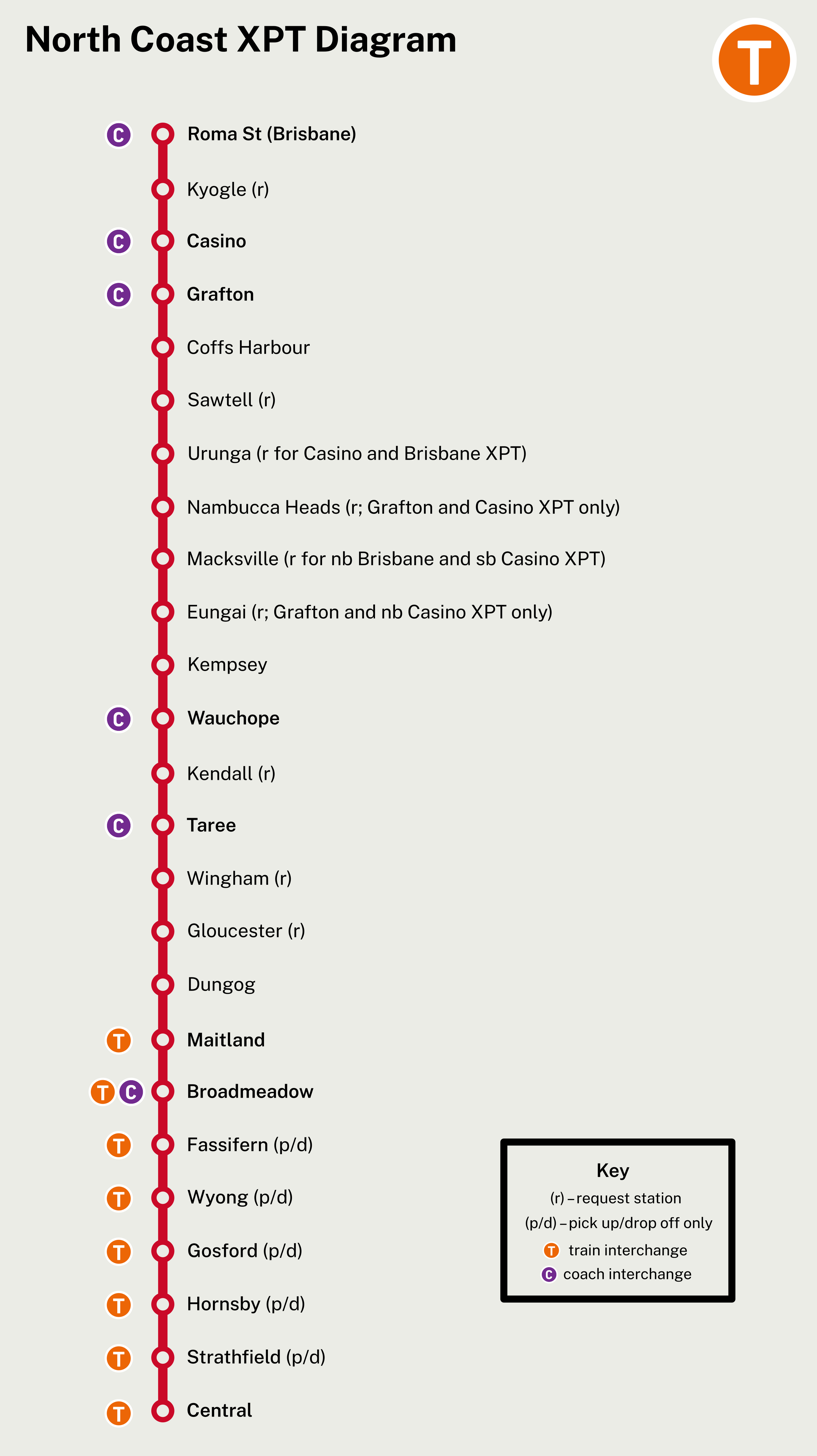
North Coast XPT diagram.

North Coast services operate through the Mid North Coast, Northern Rivers and South East Queensland regions. Services operate on the Main North and North Coast lines, travelling between Sydney Central station and Roma Street station in Brisbane.

Principal stations served by XPT trains are:

- Taree
- Kempsey
- Coffs Harbour
- Grafton
- Casino
- Brisbane

See the full list of stations served.

Cities and towns served by NSW TrainLink coaches connecting off North Coast services include: Tea Gardens, Forster, Port Macquarie, Yamba, Moree, Alstonville, Lismore, Ballina, Byron Bay, Murwillumbah, Tweed Heads and Surfers Paradise.

==== North Western ====
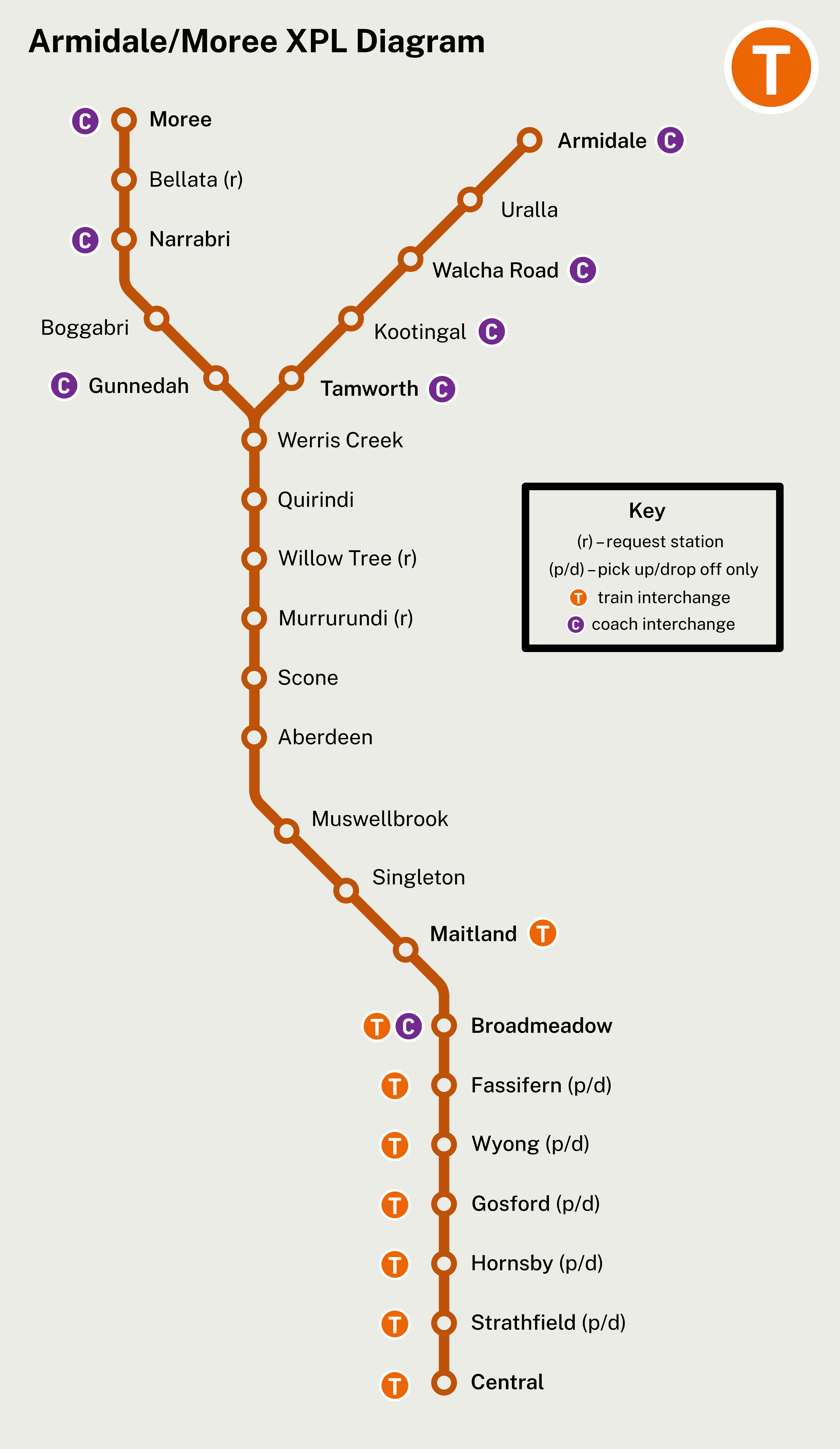
Route diagram of the Armidale and Moree XPL services.

North Western services operate through the Hunter, New England and North West Slopes & Plains regions. Services operate on the Main North line from Sydney Central station to Werris Creek. where the service divides for Armidale and Moree.

Principal stations served by Xplorer trains are:

- Singleton
- Muswellbrook
- Scone
- Tamworth
- Armidale
- Gunnedah
- Narrabri
- Moree

Cities and towns served by NSW TrainLink coaches connecting off North Western services include: Burren Junction (via Wee Waa), Inverell, Walcha, Grafton, Glen Innes and Tenterfield.

==== Western ====
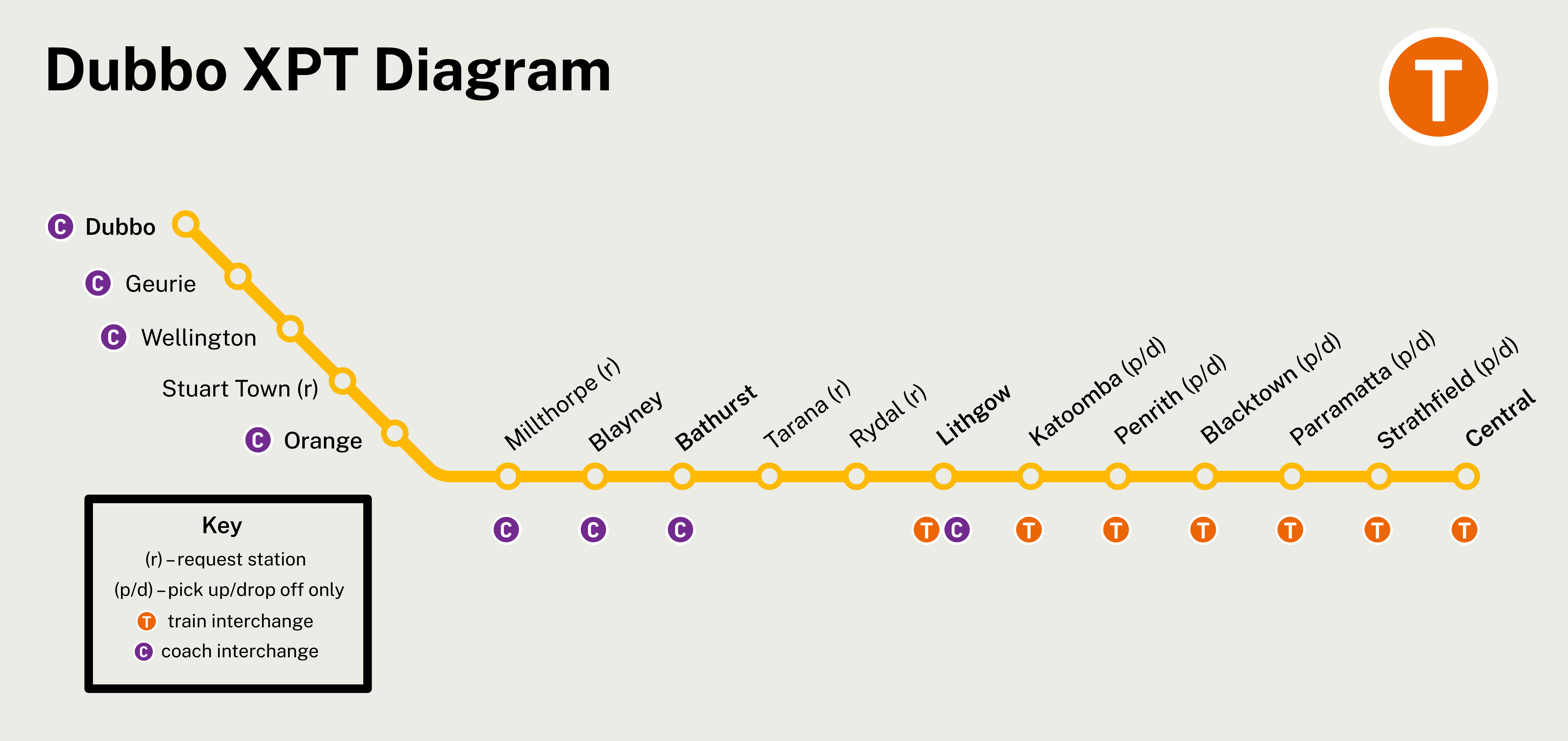
Dubbo XPT route diagram.

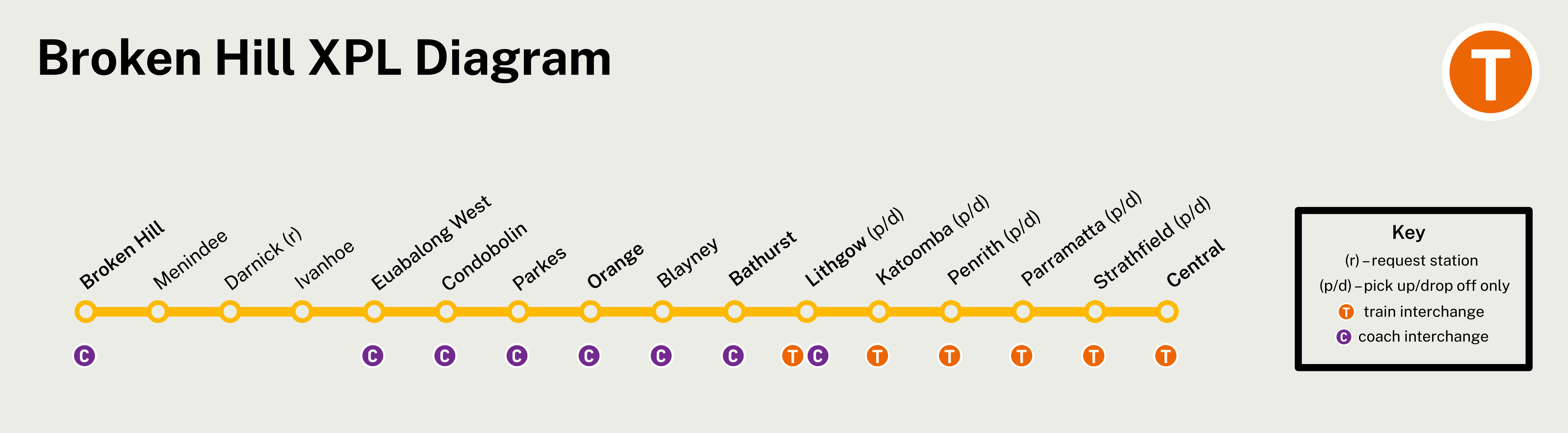
Broken Hill Xplorer route diagram.

Western region services operate through the Central Tablelands, Orana, and Far West regions. Services operate on the Main Western Line from Sydney Central station to Dubbo and the Broken Hill line to Broken Hill. Principal stations served by XPT trains are:

- Bathurst
- Orange
- Dubbo

Principal stations served by Xplorer trains are:

- Bathurst
- Orange
- Parkes
- Broken Hill

Cities and towns served by NSW TrainLink coaches connecting off Western services include Oberon, Mudgee, Baradine, Cowra, Grenfell, Forbes, Parkes, Condobolin, Lightning Ridge, Brewarrina, Bourke, Warren and Broken Hill.

==== Southern ====
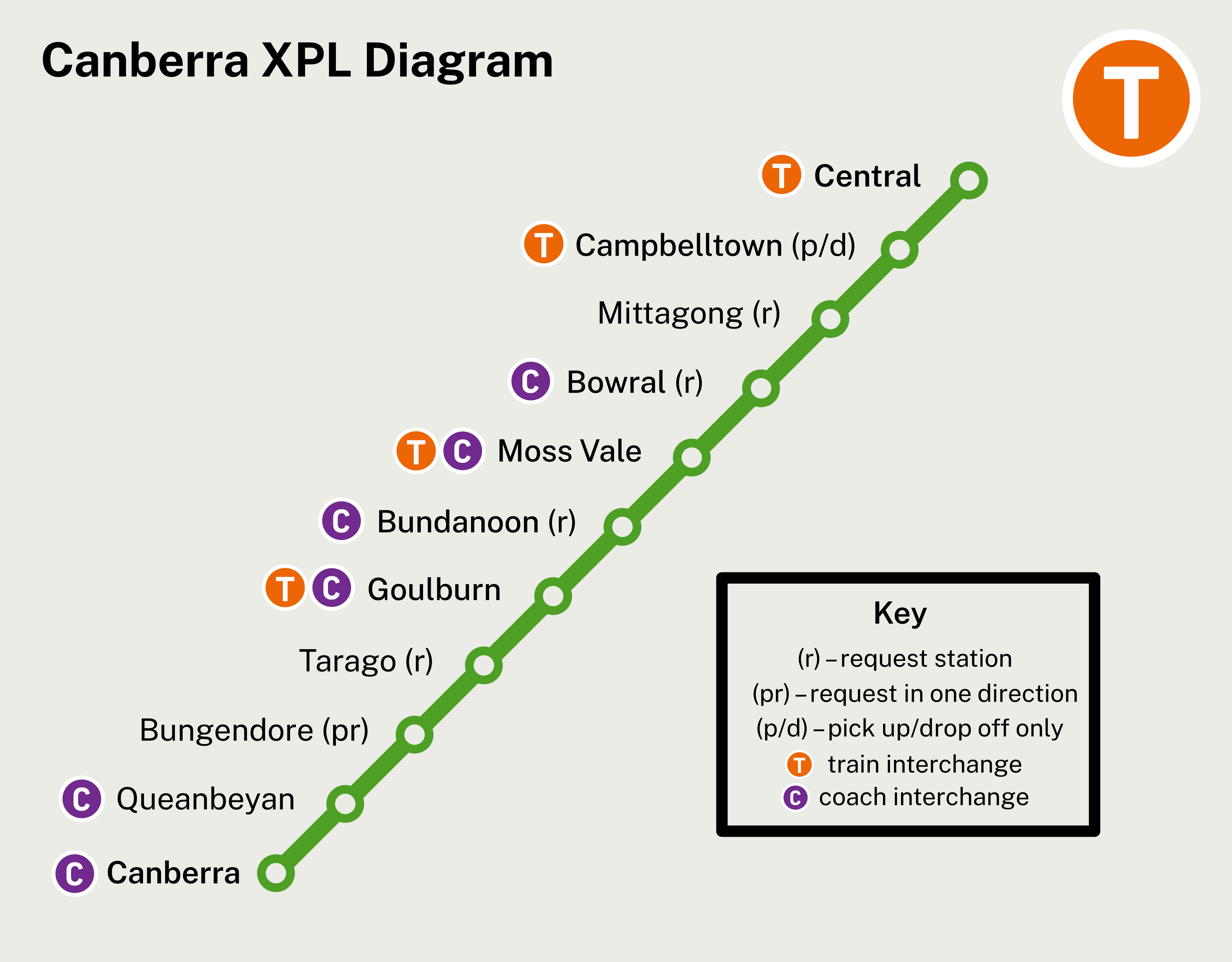
Canberra Xplorer route diagram.

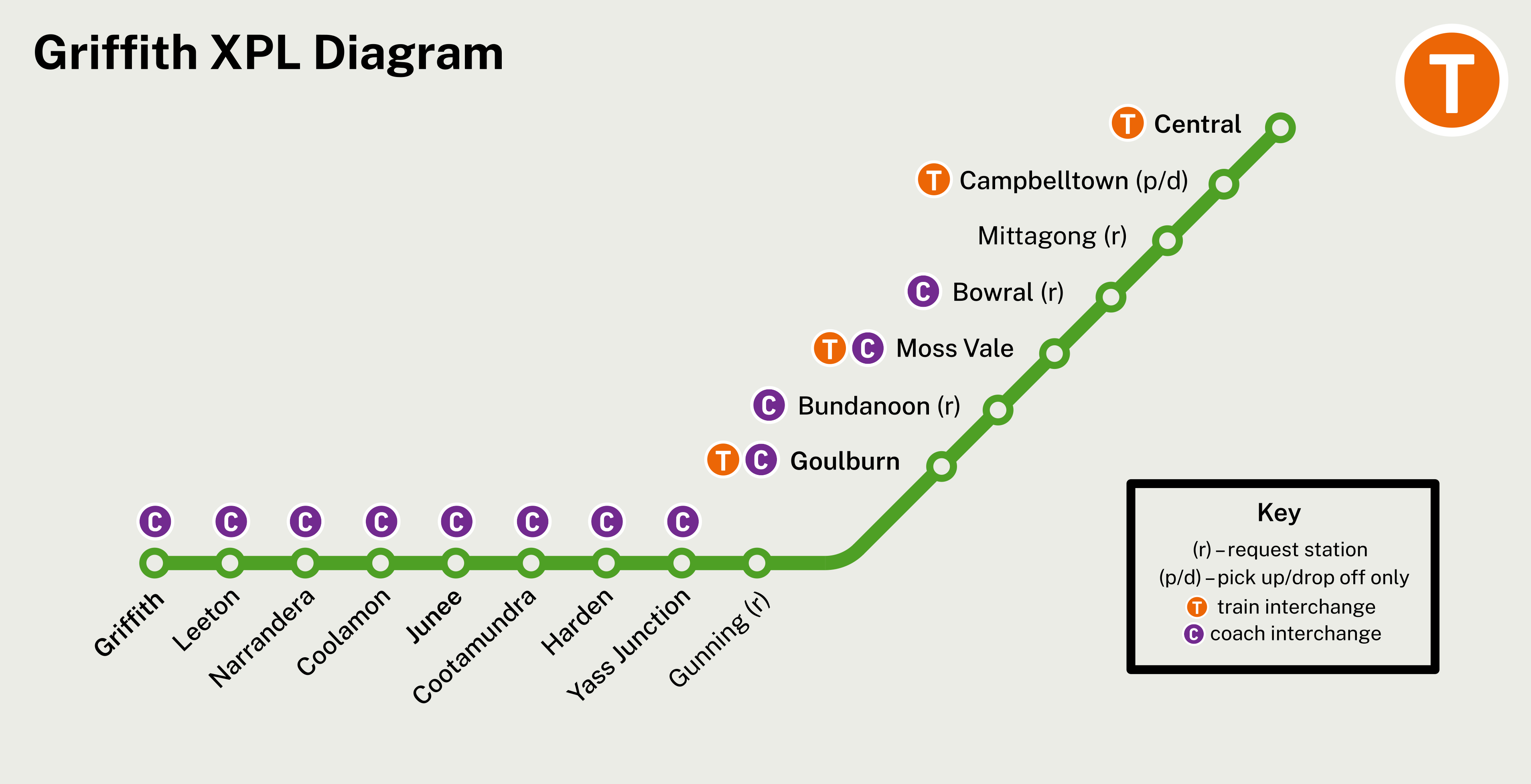
Griffith Xplorer route diagram.

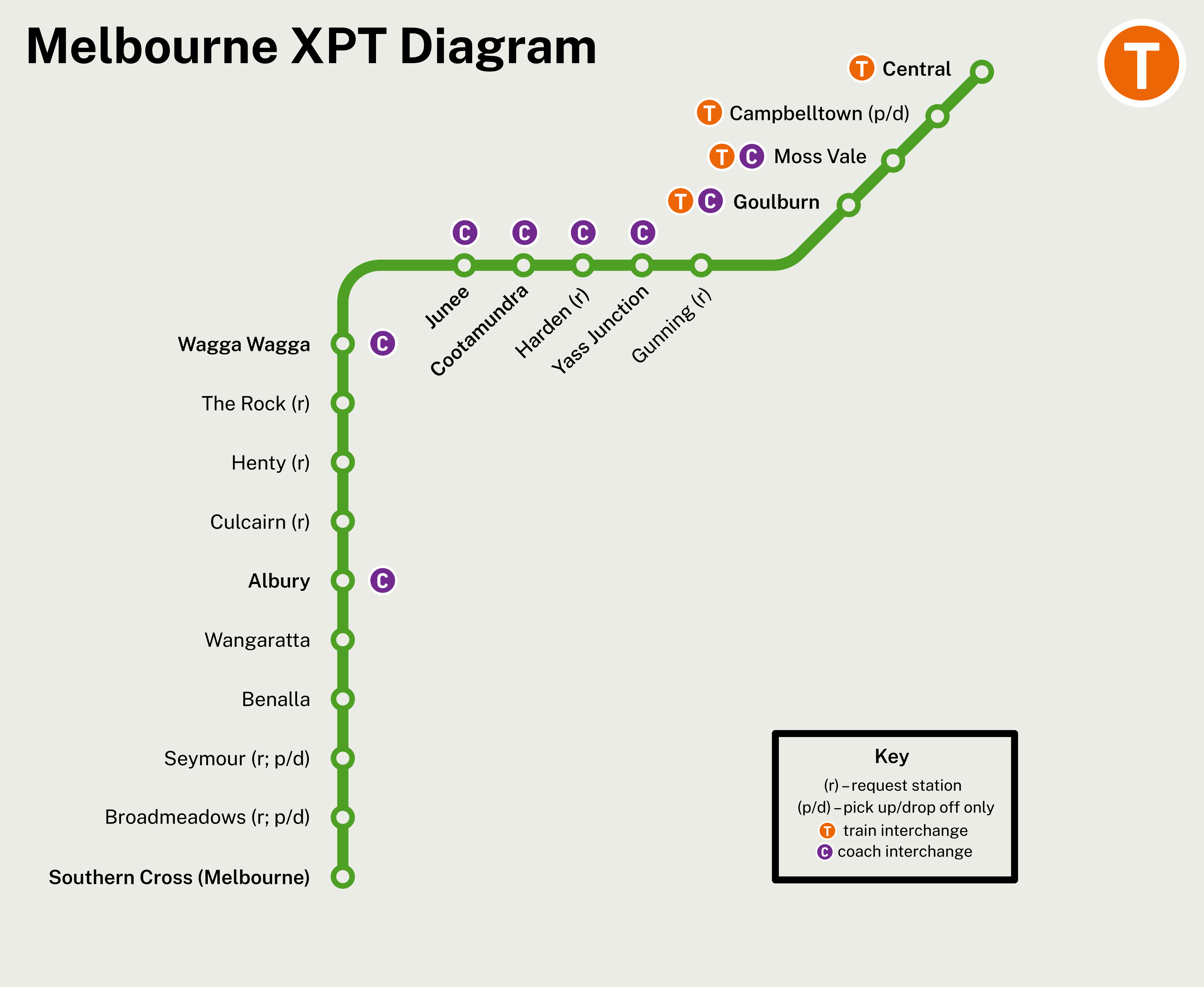
Melbourne XPT route diagram.

Southern region services operate through the Illawarra, South Coast, Monaro, South Western Slopes, Southern Tablelands, Riverina, and Sunraysia regions, plus the Australian Capital Territory and parts of Victoria.

Services operate on the:

- Main Southern Line from Sydney Central station to Albury then continue on the North East line to Southern Cross station in Melbourne
- Bombala Line from south of Goulburn to Queanbeyan where services join the Canberra line to terminate inside the Australian Capital Territory at Canberra
- Hay Line from Junee to Yanco where services join the Yanco–Griffith line to Griffith

Principal stations served by XPT trains are:

- Goulburn
- Cootamundra
- Wagga Wagga
- Albury
- Wangaratta
- Melbourne

Principal stations served by Xplorer trains are:

- Moss Vale
- Goulburn
- Queanbeyan
- Canberra
- Cootamundra
- Griffith

Cities and towns served by NSW TrainLink coaches connecting off Southern services include: Wollongong, Bombala, Eden, Tumbarumba, Bathurst, Dubbo, Condobolin, Griffith, Mildura and Echuca.

Roundel used to identify coach services

=== Coach services ===
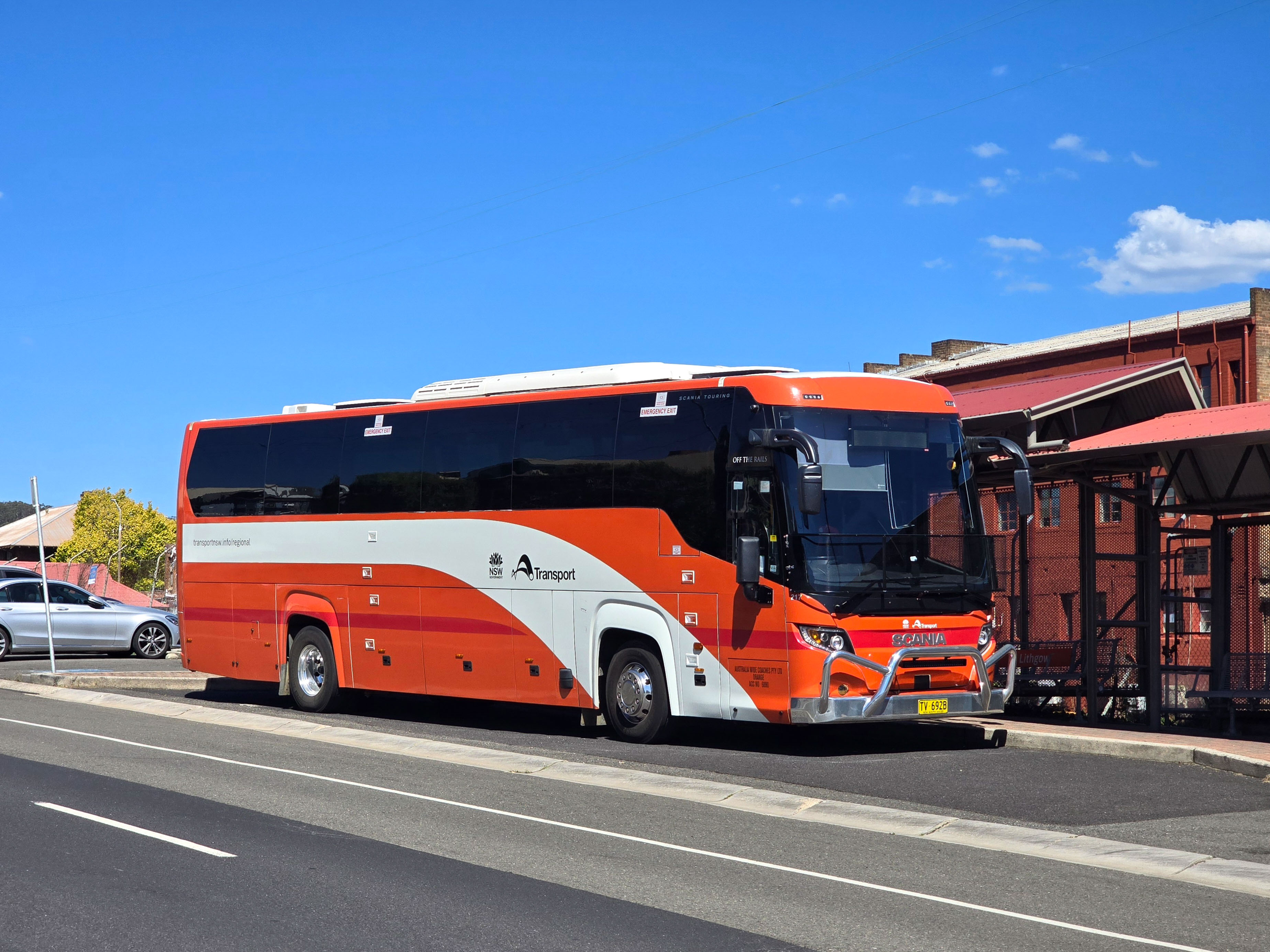
Australia Wide Coaches Scania Touring bodied K370CB at Lithgow station in January 2026

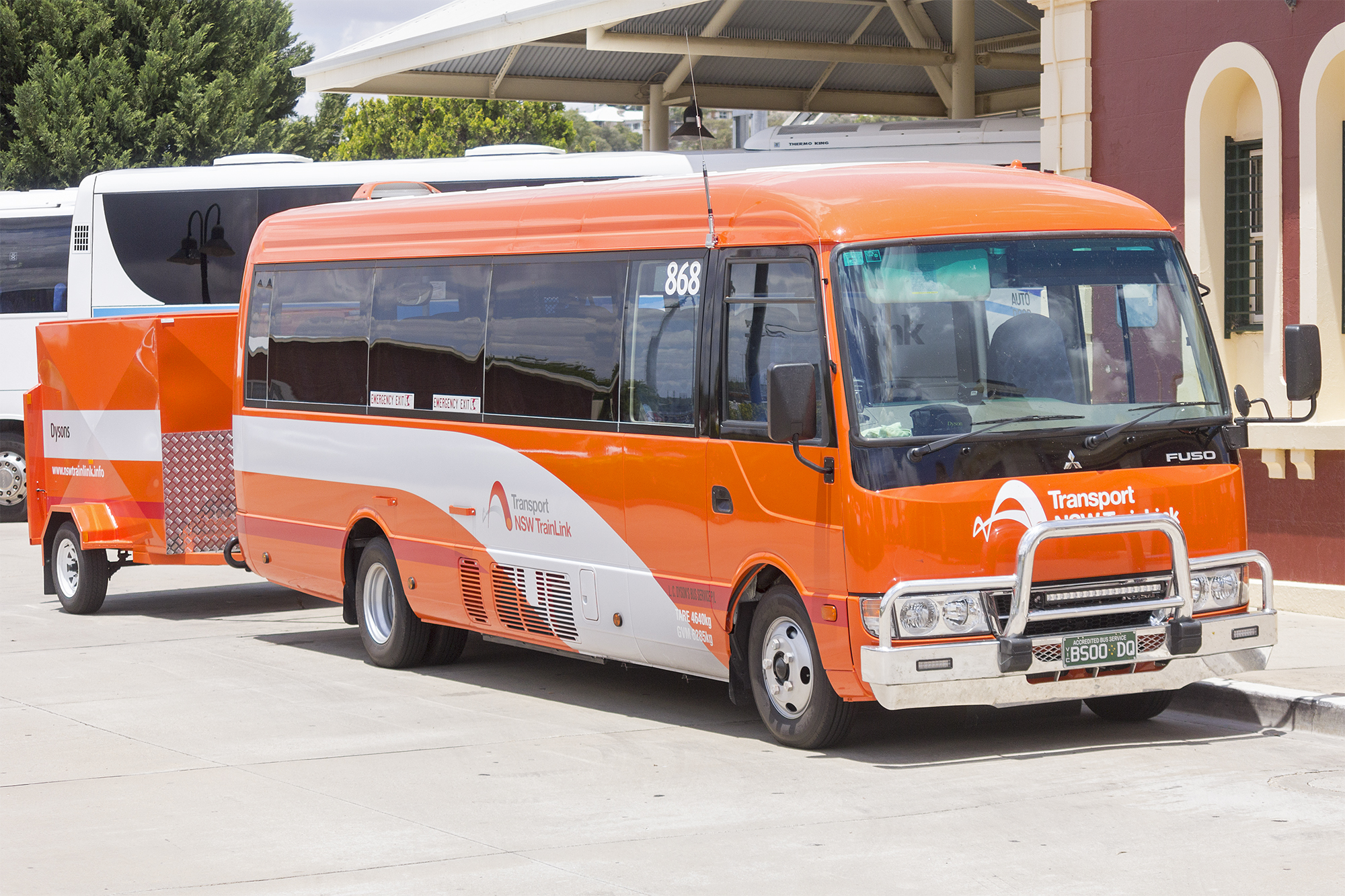
Dysons Mitsubishi Fuso Rosa at Wagga Wagga station in January 2015

NSW TrainLink continued with the existing contracts entered into by CityRail and CountryLink for the provision of coach services.

On 1 July 2014, the Lithgow to Gulgong, Coonabarabran, Baradine services passed from Greyhound Australia to Ogden's Coaches.

In July 2014, Transport for NSW commenced the re-tendering process for most of the routes with the previous 24 contracts reorganised into 18 contracts. The new contracts commenced on 1 January 2015 for a five-year period, with an option to extend for three years if performance criteria are met. The services operated by Forest Coach Lines and Sunstate Coaches commenced new five-year contracts on 1 July 2016.

The full list of coach operators providing services as at January 2015 was:

Operator	Services
Australia Wide Coaches	Lithgow to Bathurst, Orange and Parkes
BusBiz	Lithgow to Dubbo and Nyngan; Dubbo to Lightning Ridge; Dubbo to Bourke; Dubbo to Broken Hill; Coolabah to Brewarrina; Wagga Wagga to Kingston and Queanbeyan
Berrima Buslines	Picton to Bowral
CDC Canberra	Canberra to Bombala and Eden
Dysons	Wagga Wagga to Griffith; Cootamundra to Tumbarumba; Cootamundra to Bathurst or Dubbo; Parkes to Condobolin
Forest Coach Lines	Narrabri to Wee Waa & Burren Junction
Hunter Valley Buses	Fassifern to Toronto
Loader's Coaches	Lithgow to Grenfell
Oberon Bus Company	Mount Victoria to Oberon
Ogden's Coaches	Lithgow to Gulgong, Coonabarabran and Baradine
The Oxley Explorer	Armidale to Tenterfield, Port Macquarie to Tamworth, Tamworth to Port Macquarie
Port Stephens Coaches	Broadmeadow to Taree, Port Macquarie to Wauchope, Wauchope to Port Macquarie
Premier Shoalhaven	Kiama to Bomaderry and Moss Vale to Wollongong
G&J Purtill	Cootamundra to Condobolin; Cootamundra to Mildura; Wagga Wagga to Echuca; Albury to Echuca
Roadcoach	Queanbeyan to Cootamundra; Goulburn to Campbelltown
Sunstate Coaches	Grafton to Byron Bay; Casino to Tweed Heads; Casino to Surfers Paradise; Casino to Brisbane
Symes Coaches	Tamworth or Armidale to Inverell; Moree to Grafton

+ not included in January 2015 re-tendering process

From 2018, NSW TrainLink introduced several new road coach services on a trial basis:

- Brewarrina to Coolabah commenced May 2018
- Bourke to Dubbo commenced May 2018
- Tamworth to Port Macquarie
- Tamworth to Scone, had ceased by November 2018
- Tamworth to Dubbo
- Campbelltown to Goulburn commenced September 2018
- Goulburn to Canberra commenced September 2018, made permanent in June 2023
- Forster to Coffs Harbour commenced April 2019
- Wagga Wagga to Queanbeyan commenced April 2019
- Broken Hill to Adelaide commenced June 2019, made permanent in June 2023
- Broken Hill to Mildura commenced June 2019, made permanent in June 2023
- Anglers Reach to Cooma commenced December 2019
- Bigga to Goulburn commenced December 2019
- Delegate to Nimmitabel commenced December 2019
- Goodooga to Dubbo commenced December 2019
- Moree to Walgett commenced December 2019

== Rolling stock ==
The entire NSW TrainLink fleet is maintained by Sydney Trains either directly or via a Sydney Trains contract with UGL Rail.

Class	Image	Type	Service Speed		Carriage Numbers	Routes operated	Built
Class	Image	Type	km/h	mph	Carriage Numbers	Routes operated	Built
XPT		Diesel power car	160	99	19	North Coast Region Southern Region Western Region	1981–1994
XPT carriages		Passenger carriage	160	99	60	North Coast Region Southern Region Western Region	1981–1994
Xplorer		Diesel multiple unit	145	90	23	North Western Region Southern Region Western Region	1993

=== Future fleet ===
Class	Image	Type	Service Speed		Carriage Numbers	Future routes	Built
Class	Image	Type	km/h	mph	Carriage Numbers	Future routes	Built
R set		Electro-diesel multiple unit	160	99	117 (to be built)	North Coast Region North Western Region Southern Region Western Region	2026/27 (scheduled)

A fleet of bi-mode CAF Civity trains is scheduled to replace the XPT, Xplorer and Endeavour fleets as part of the NSW TrainLink Regional Train Project.

== Performance ==
Patronage surged on regional trains in 2023, reversing pandemic-era losses and increasing a further three percent, with a particular increase in ridership on Sydney–Melbourne services. 107,000 monthly journeys were made on regional trains in 2023.

Regional services are considered on-time if they operate within ten minutes of their scheduled time. The target is for 92 percent of intercity services (formerly operated by NSW TrainLink) and 78 percent of regional services to operate on-time. In 2017–18, NSW Trains met both the Intercity target and the regional target. However, it failed to meet the Intercity target during peak hours. These results partially reverse a trend of failing to meet punctuality targets. Since the organisation commenced operations in 2013–14, NSW Trains has never met the intercity peak punctuality target. Regional train services have achieved their punctuality target twice, in 2015–16 and 2017–18. The 2015–16 result was the first time NSW Trains or its predecessor RailCorp had achieved the target in 13 years.

The following table lists patronage figures for the network during the corresponding financial year. Australia's financial years start on 1 July and end on 30 June. Major events that affected the number of journeys made or how patronage is measured are included as notes.

NSW TrainLink patronage by financial year
Year	2013–14	2014–15	2015–16	2016–17	2017–18	2018–19	2019–20	2023–24
Intercity (millions)	32.9 (Note: Opal rollout completed in April 2014)	34.5 (Note: Services in central Newcastle replaced by buses in December 2014)	38.5 (Note: Increase largely due to a change in the calculation of journeys for Opal vs magnetic stripe tickets)	40.8 (Note: Non-Opal tickets discontinued in August 2016)	44.7 (Note: Newcastle Interchange extension opened in October 2017)	41.3	31.2 (Note: Patronage was lower than previous years due to people staying at home and not taking public transport to school or work during the COVID-19 pandemic)	33.4
Regional trains (millions)	1.23	1.22	1.24	1.69	< 1.7 (Note: Patronage reported as 1.7 million journeys but was down by 1.4 percent compared to the previous year)			1.9
Regional coaches (millions)	0.572	0.537	0.510	1.69	< 1.7			1.9
References								

== Depots ==
The XPT fleet is maintained at the XPT Service Centre and the Endeavour and Xplorer fleets at Eveleigh Railway Workshops. The new bi-mode fleet will be maintained at a new facility, Mindyarra Maintenance Centre, in Dubbo.
