= Kempsey railway station =

Australian railway station

Kempsey
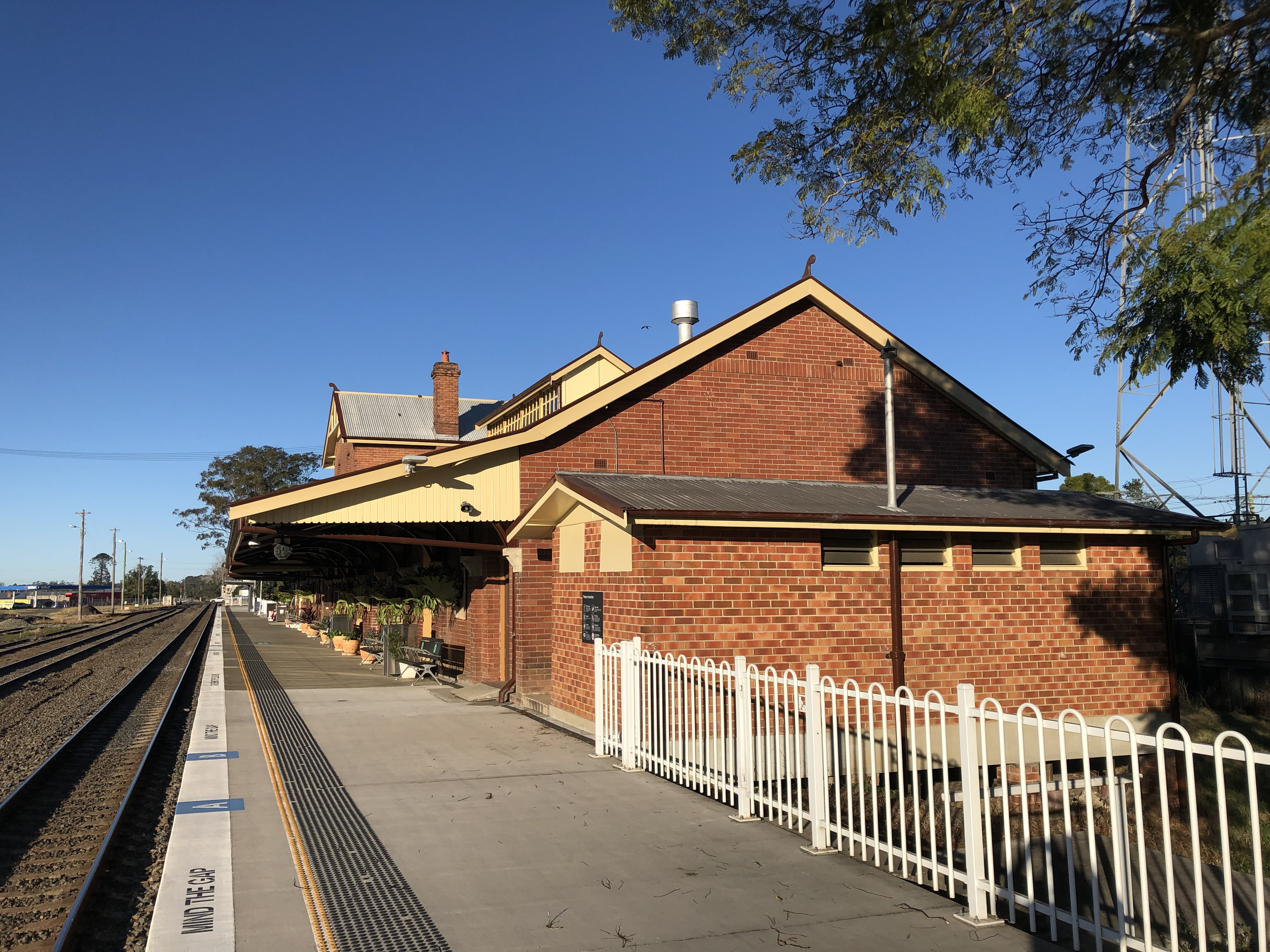
- Southbound view from station platform, July 2021

General information
- Location: Kemp Street, Kempsey
- Coordinates: 31°04′37″S 152°49′58″E
- Elevation: 3 metres (9.8 ft)
- System: Side platform
- Owner: Transport Asset Manager of New South Wales
- Operator: NSW TrainLink
- Line: North Coast
- Distance: 503.65 km (312.95 mi) from Central
- Platforms: 1

Construction
- Structure type: Ground
- Accessible: Yes

Other information
- Station code: KPS

History
- Opened: 3 December 1917; 108 years ago

Services
Preceding station	NSW TrainLink	Following station
Eungai towards Grafton or Casino	NSW TrainLink North Coast Line Grafton & northbound Casino XPTs	Wauchope towards Sydney
Macksville towards Brisbane	NSW TrainLink North Coast Line Brisbane & southbound Casino XPTs	Wauchope towards Sydney
Former services
Preceding station	Former services	Following station
Former NSW Main line services
Collombatti towards Brisbane	North Coast Line	Kundabung towards Maitland
Location

Kempsey railway station is located on the North Coast line in New South Wales, Australia. It serves the town of Kempsey, opening on 3 December 1917 when the line was extended from Wauchope. It was the terminus of the line until it was extended to Macksville on 1 July 1919.

When built, the Macleay Chronicle Newspaper noted that the station was "easily the finest this side of Newcastle and will have no rivals between here and Grafton".

The station was damaged by fire on 23 December 1939. The parcels office was completely gutted while severe damage was done to the booking office, the stationmaster's office, the ceiling of the waiting room, the signal cabin and the roof and awning of the platform.

Maintenance on locomotives and rolling stock is no longer carried out in Kempsey and the engine shed and work buildings have since been demolished.

== Platforms and services ==
Kempsey has one platform with a yard opposite. Each day northbound XPT services operate to Grafton, Casino and Brisbane, with three southbound services operating to Sydney.

Platform	Line	Stopping pattern	Notes
1	North Coast Region	services to Central, Grafton, Casino & Brisbane	
