= Eungai railway station =

Australian railway station

Eungai
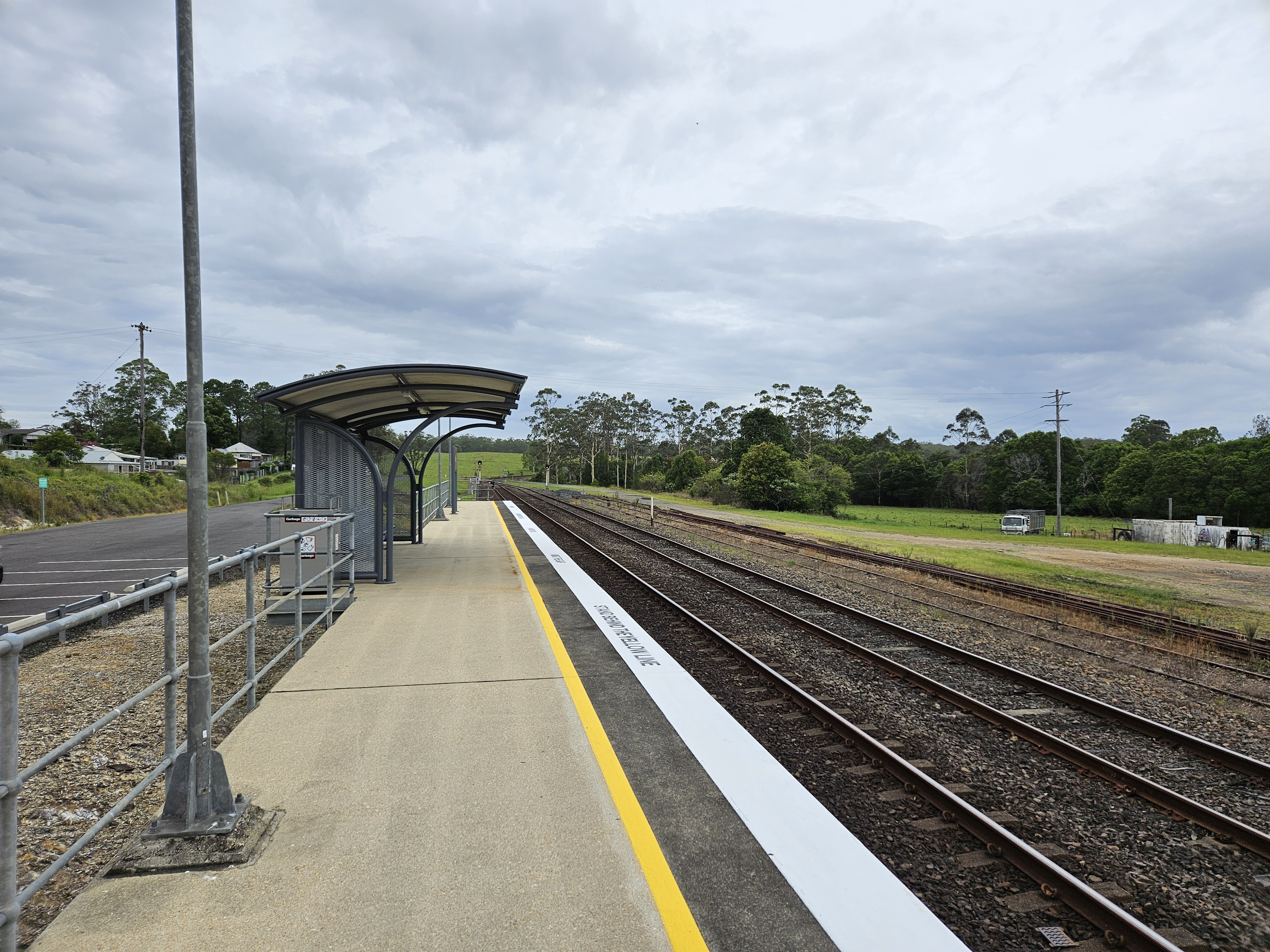
- Southbound view from station platform, December 2023

General information
- Location: Station Street, Eungai
- Coordinates: 30°50′59″S 152°54′01″E
- Owner: Transport Asset Manager of New South Wales
- Operator: NSW TrainLink
- Line: North Coast
- Distance: 534.6 km (332.2 mi) from Central
- Platforms: 1
- Tracks: 1

Construction
- Structure type: Ground
- Accessible: Yes

Other information
- Station code: ENG

History
- Opened: 1 July 1919; 107 years ago

Services
Preceding station	NSW TrainLink	Following station
Macksville towards Grafton or Casino	NSW TrainLink North Coast Line	Kempsey towards Sydney
Location
- Location within New South Wales

Eungai railway station is located on the North Coast line in New South Wales, Australia. It serves the town of Eungai, opening on 1 July 1919 when the line was extended from Kempsey to Macksville. Opposite the station lies a passing loop. It was extended to 1.5 kilometres (0.93 mi) in January 1996.

== Platforms and services ==
Eungai has one platform. Each day northbound XPT services operate to Grafton and Casino, with the southbound Brisbane and Grafton XPT services operating to Sydney. This station is a request stop, so the train stops only if passengers booked to board/alight here. The northbound Brisbane and the southbound Casino XPTs pass through this station without stopping.

Platform	Line	Stopping pattern	Notes
1	North Coast Region	services to Sydney Central, Grafton & Casino	request stop (booked passengers only)
