= New South Wales Z12 class locomotive =

Class of 4-4-0 steam locomotives operated in Australia

New South Wales Z12 class
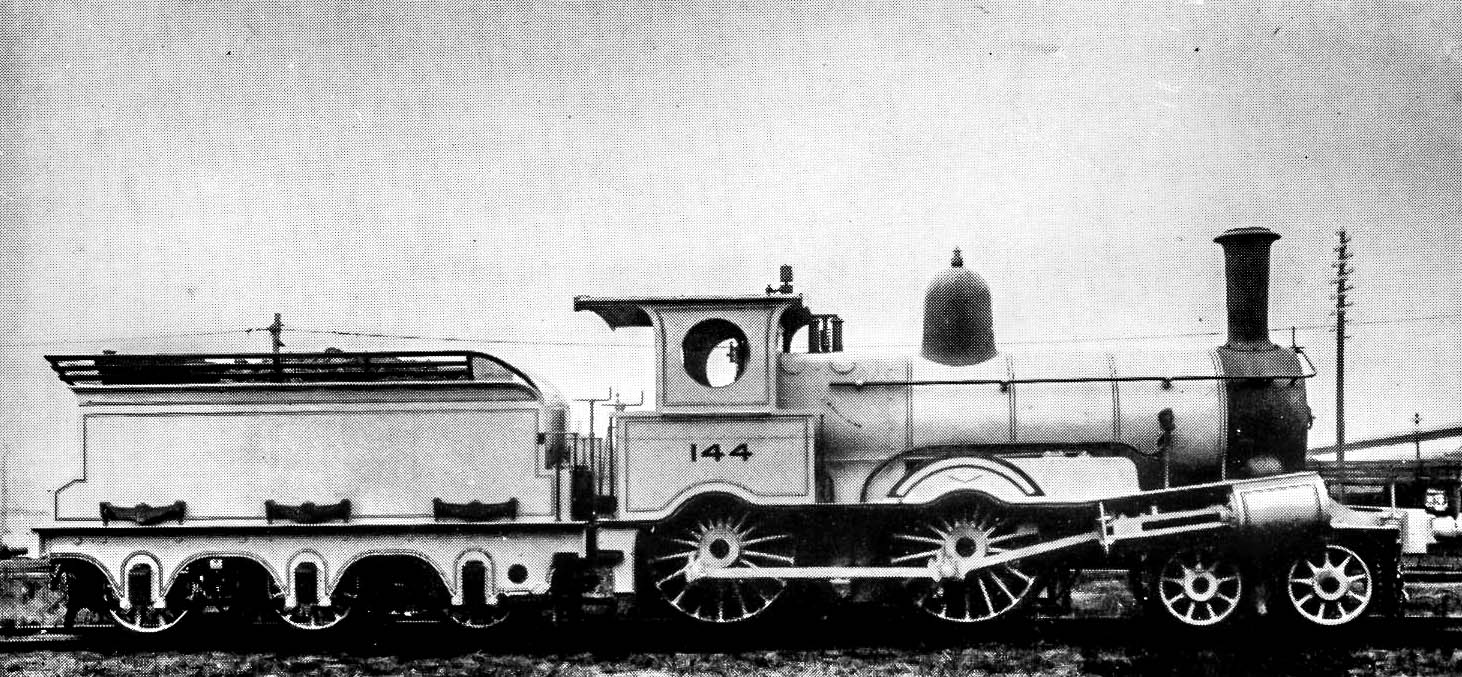
Type and origin
- Power type: Steam
- Builder: Beyer, Peacock & Company (34); Dübs & Company (26); Atlas Engineering Works (8)
- Build date: 1877–1882
- Total produced: 68
Specifications
- Configuration
  - Whyte: 4-4-0
- Gauge: 4 ft 8 1/2 in (1,435 mm) standard gauge
- Driver dia.: 5 ft 6 in (1,676 mm)
- Adhesive weight: 57,000–62,000 lb (25,900–28,100 kg)
- Loco weight: 84,000–95,000 lb (38,100–43,100 kg)
- Firebox
  - Grate area: 15 sq ft (1.4 m^{2})
- Boiler pressure: 130 psi (896 kPa) as built; 140 psi (965 kPa) later
- Heating surface: 1,070–1,120 sq ft (99–104 m^{2})
- Cylinders: 2 outside
- Cylinder size: 18 in × 24 in (457 mm × 610 mm)
- Train brakes: Air
Performance figures
- Tractive effort: 13,019–14,020 lbf (57.9–62.4 kN)
Career
- Operators: New South Wales Government Railways
- Numbers: As built: 79-92, 118-126, 143-157, 165-182, 27N-30N, 37N-39N, 47N-51N; From 1924: 1201-1248
- Preserved: 1210, 1219, 1243
- Disposition: 20 rebuilt as Z13 class, 45 scrapped, 3 preserved

The Z12 class is a class of 4-4-0 steam locomotives operated by the New South Wales Government Railways of Australia. The locomotives were built by Beyer, Peacock and Company, Dübs and Company and Atlas Engineering Works between 1877 and 1882.

== History ==
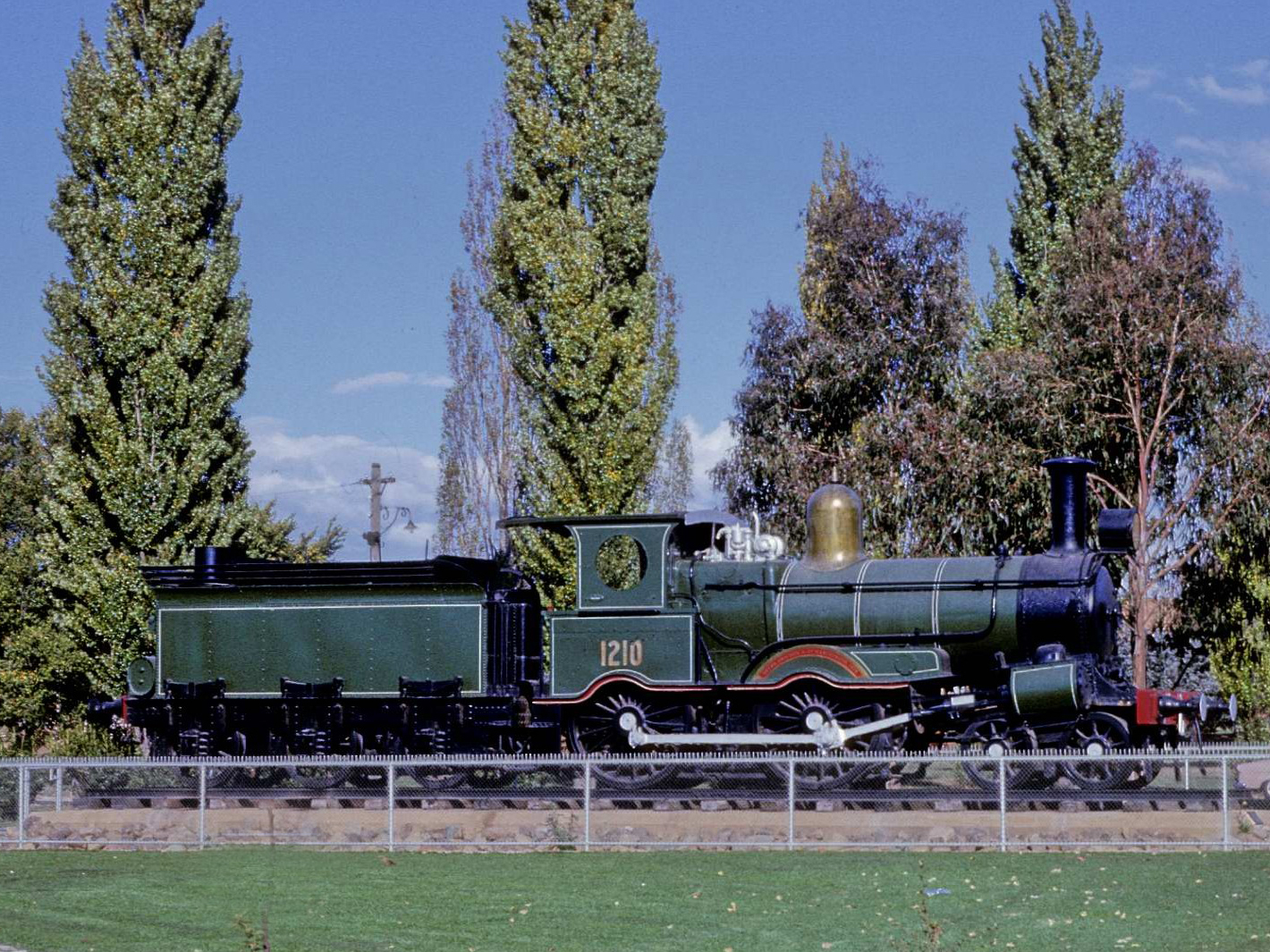
1210 when on display outside Canberra railway station

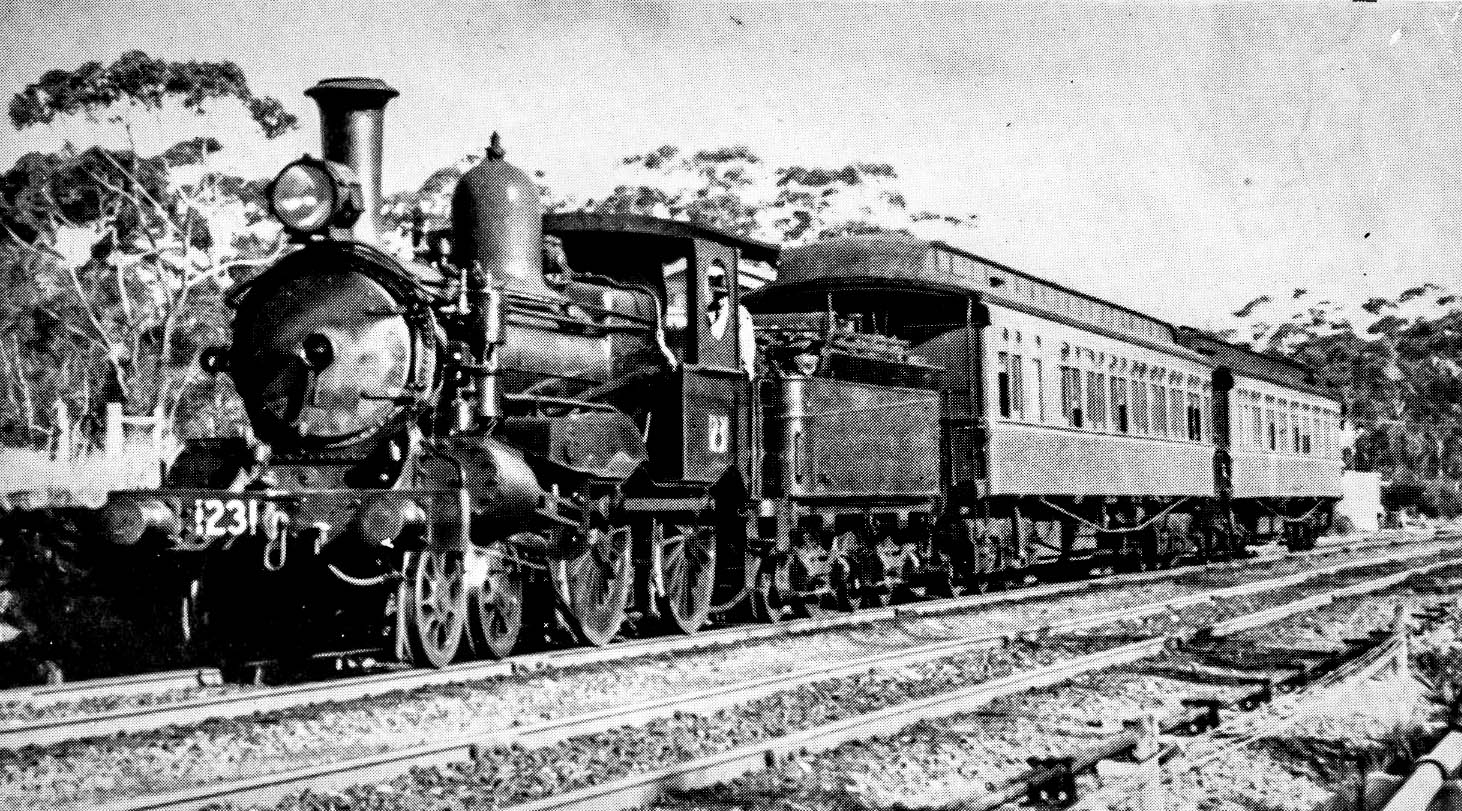
1231 at Summit Tank

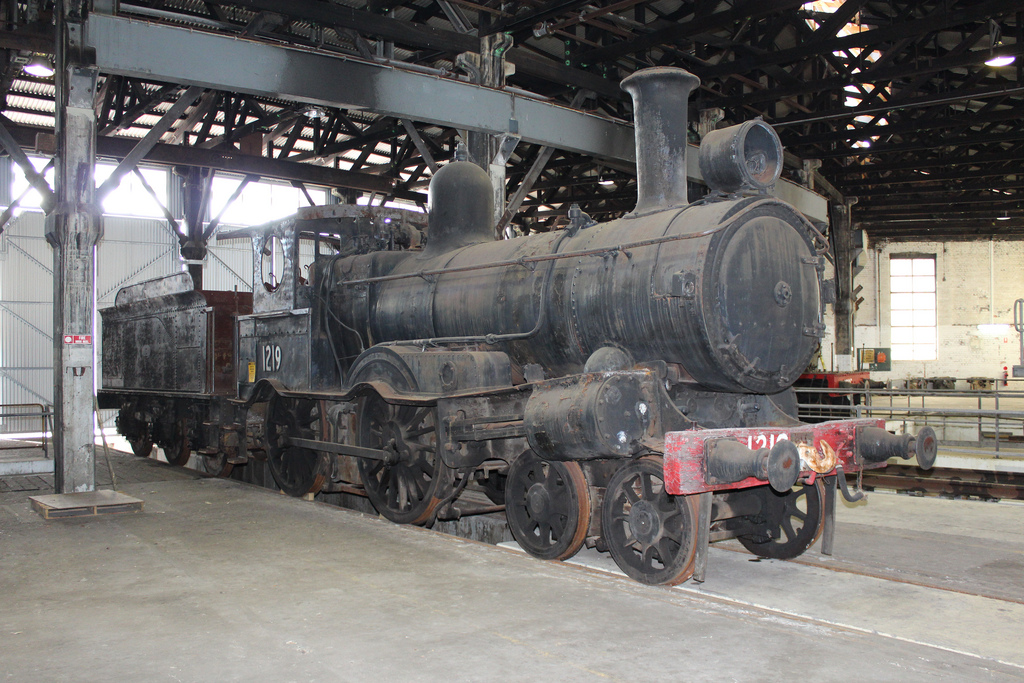
1219 stored at Broadmeadow Locomotive Depot

The Z12 class (formerly C79 and C80 class) was the first class of locomotive on the New South Wales Government Railways to be built in relatively large numbers. They hauled all express passenger and mail trains for some 20 years.

The design derives from the Metropolitan Railway A Class 4-4-0T condensing steam locomotives built for the Metropolitan Railway by Beyer, Peacock & Company in 1864. The design of these locomotives was attributed to the Metropolitan Engineer John Fowler, but the design was a development of a locomotive Beyers had built for the Spanish Tudela & Bilbao Railway, Fowler only specifying the driving wheel diameter, axle weight and the ability to navigate sharp curves.

A total of 68 were built. The first batch of 30 were built by Beyer, Peacock & Company and placed in service as the 79 class between 1877 and 1879. They were the first locomotives to be imported with Westinghouse continuous air-brakes already fitted. The second batch of 26 came from Dübs & Company. These arrived between 1880 and 1881. A further four followed from Beyer, Peacock in 1881. To assist local industry, a contract for eight was awarded to the Atlas Engineering Works, Haymarket and delivered in 1881–1882.

Their numbers were thinned from 1895 when No. 88 was converted at Eveleigh Railway Workshops to a 4-4-2T tank engine for Sydney suburban service with a further 19 following by 1902. These were reclassified the CC79 class. The remaining engines became the C80 class.

The arrival of newer locomotives such as the D255, D261, O446 and P6 classes saw them relegated to hauling secondary and later branch line services radiating out of Dubbo, Werris Creek, Narrabri and Moree, where some were equipped with cowcatchers for operation on unfenced lines. In an attempt to prevent cinders blocking the lower boiler tubes between cleanings in December 1956 an extended smokebox was fitted to 1219 with 1243 similarly modified in the 1960s.

As part of the 1924 reclassification scheme, the remaining 48 members of the class were reclassified as the Z12 class and renumbered 1201 to 1248. With the conversion of 77 C30 class suburban tank engines (made redundant by electrification) into C30T class 4-6-0s, withdrawals begin with 23 taken out of service between 1928 and 1933. Many of the others survived into the 1950s hauling branch line services.

The first two withdrawals occurred in 1957, a further four followed in 1963.

In 1955, for the centenary of rail operations in New South Wales, 1243 was restored to its original livery. It was joined by 1210 in December 1959 and together these hauled the Vintage Train across the state.

== Preservation ==
Three have been preserved:

- 1210 placed on display outside Canberra railway station in January 1962, significant to Canberra having hauled the first train into the city in May 1914. Removed in 1984 and restored to service in 1988 by the Canberra Railway Museum.
- 1219 by the NSW Rail Museum, initially at Enfield Locomotive Depot, then Thirlmere from 1975, and Broadmeadow Locomotive Depot since 2009 In February 2024 1219 was moved to the Heritage Hub at Chullora Workshops.
- 1243 by the Museum of Applied Arts & Sciences, placed in custody of the New South Wales Rail Transport Museum in operational condition, withdrawn in 1982, placed on display at the Powerhouse Museum, Ultimo in September 1987.
