= Yass railway station =

Yass railway station may refer to:

- Yass Junction railway station, a station on the Main Southern railway line on Yass's outskirts in New South Wales, Australia
- Yass Town railway station, a former railway station and railway museum on the Yass Town Tramway in New South Wales, Australia
