= Railways in Canberra =

Railways in the Australian Capital Territory

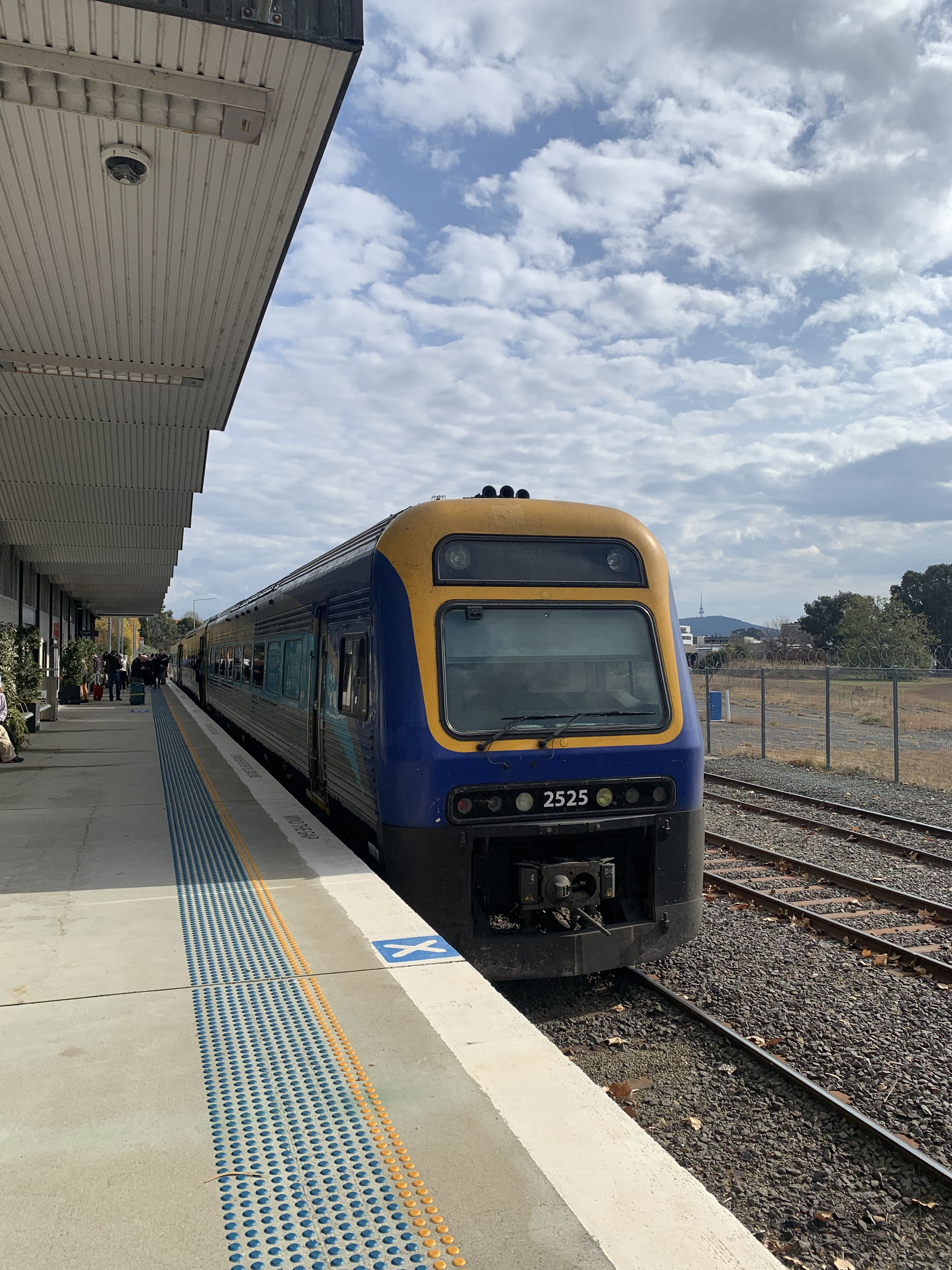
Ex-Sydney Xplorer at Canberra station

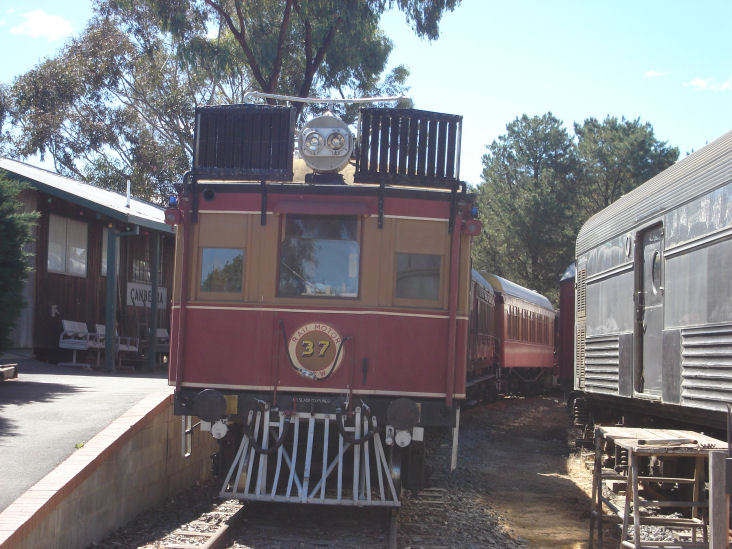
CPH railmotor at the Canberra Railway Museum

Canberra, the capital city of Australia, has been served by railways since 1914. The city is serviced by the Bombala line to New South Wales, and possesses its own light rail system. NSW TrainLink regional trains run from Canberra to Sydney.

The line to Queanbeyan, New South Wales was opened to goods traffic in 1914, with passenger services beginning in 1923. Passenger trains to Sydney were introduced in 1927. Light rail was introduced in 2019, providing Canberra with a local service.

There have been several railway proposals for or serving Canberra; the city's masterplan included suburban rail and tramways. Railways built during Canberra's construction were subsequently dismantled.

== Present ==
Canberra station is the terminus for a three-daily Xplorer service operated by NSW TrainLink from Sydney. The journey takes about four hours. NSW TrainLink road coach services operate to Cootamundra, Bombala and Eden. A V/Line coach service to Bairnsdale also operates via Canberra station.

Canberra has a railway museum near Canberra station in Kingston, and two miniature railways in Symonston and Weston Park.

=== Light rail ===
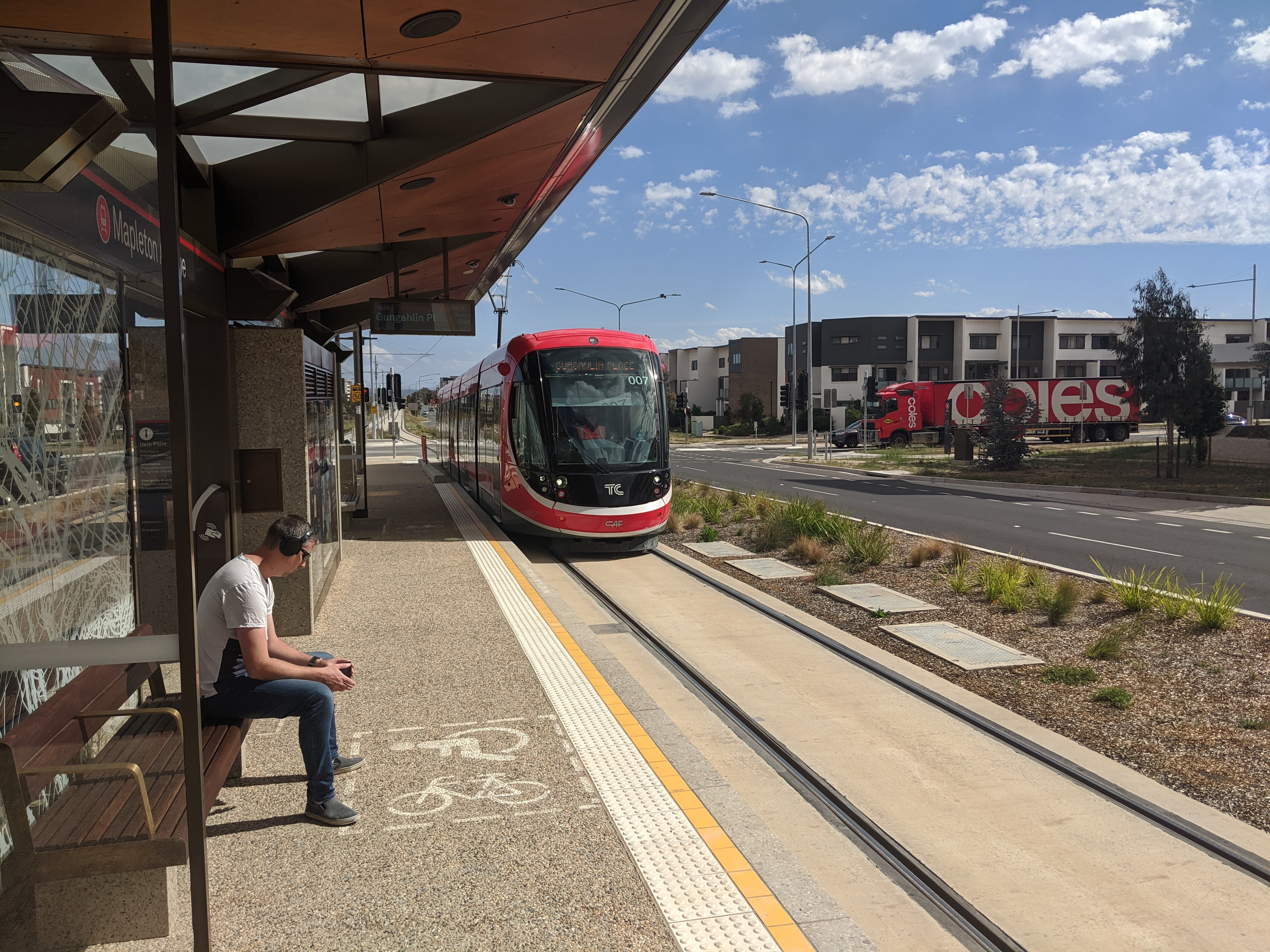
Canberra's light rail system, seen at Mapleton Avenue station

The Canberra Metro light rail system provides service within the city itself as part of Canberra's public transport network. It opened in April 2019, its development coinciding with a resurgent focus on urban train transport in Australia. The initial 12-kilometre (7.5 mi) line runs from the city centre to the northern suburbs. An extension of the line south to the Woden Town Centre is planned, to be completed in two stages.

== History ==
=== Suburban rail and tramways ===
The masterplan for Canberra devised by Marion Mahony Griffin and Walter Burley Griffin included a railway that was to run from Queanbeyan to the current Canberra railway station in Kingston then north along the causeway and over the Molonglo River to Russell, along Amaroo Street to Civic and then north out of the city along Lonsdale and Ijong Streets. But aside from the current section, the only other part constructed was the line as far as Civic, albeit to temporary standards for the purpose of carrying construction materials; it was removed in 1940. The masterplan also proposed the construction of a tram network. Canberra's modern-day light rail system follows the Griffins' tramway proposal along Northbourne Avenue.

==== Kingston to Civic Centre Station ====
Civic Centre Station opened in 1921 and was Canberra's second rail terminus, after the Commonwealth rail line was extended from Kingston. The station also served the Brickworks Railway, which crossed the river near Stotts Crossing. It was operational for little over a year on possibly Australia's shortest lived railway, though hopes of its reopening lasted over 25 years.

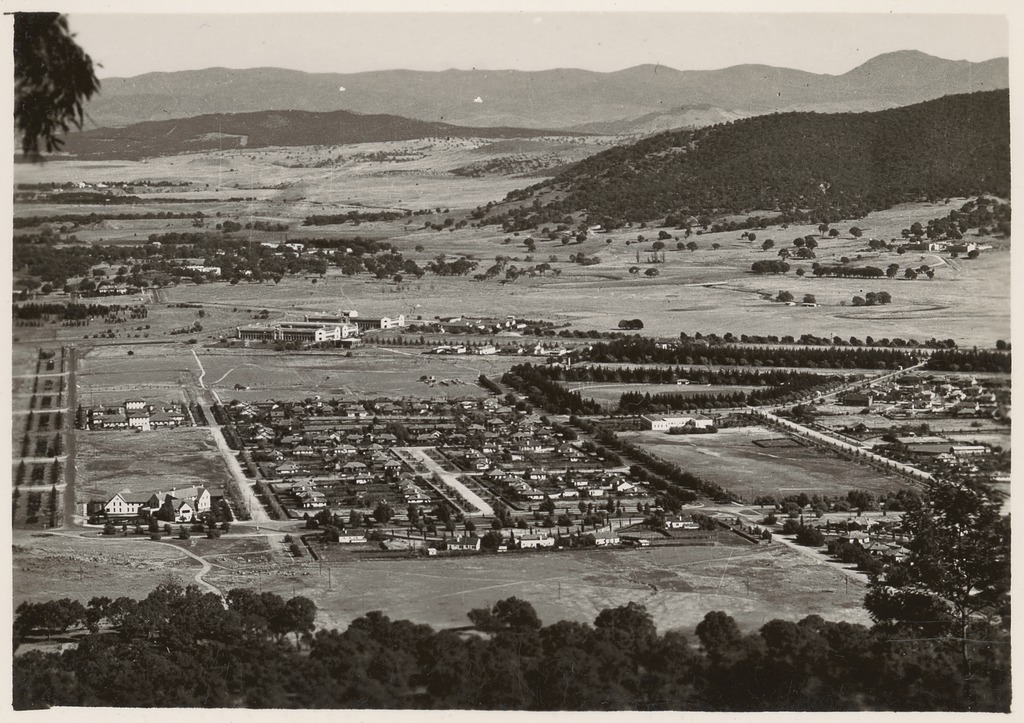
The platform of Civic Centre Station just visible in the foreground of the Sydney Building (1930s)

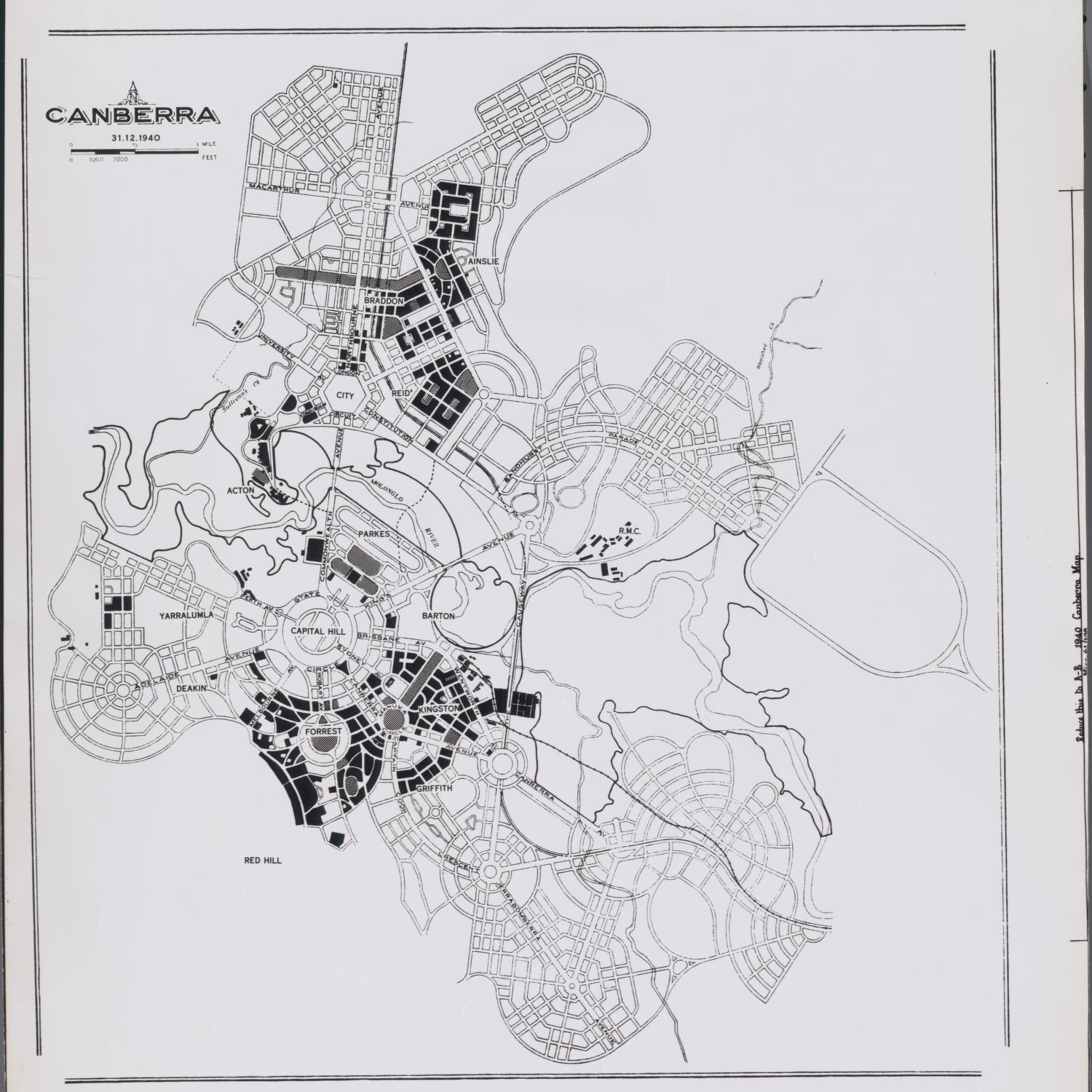
1940 map of Canberra showing the route of the Kingston to Civic Centre railway

Walter Burley Griffin's original Canberra plan included a railway to come to Canberra City, with stations on the north, east and south. In December 1916 the Federal Public Works Committee tabled its report on the city railway at Canberra in the House of Representatives. They unanimously agreed with the general direction of the permanent railway in the Griffin plan, but that there was no reason for anything other than a temporary surface railway until the development of the city warranted a permanent line. Reports suggest construction on the 3.5 mile temporary line to the city had begun by July 1918, with the bridge over the Molonglo River. The line officially opened on 15 June 1921 and ran from the Power House siding near Cunningham Street in Kingston, heading north on a causeway and across the Molonglo River. The urban area around the former railway is still known as The Causeway. A siding was provided to the north of the river at Russell for the workers camp that was there. The line curved to the north west in Reid, behind St Johns Church and the TAFE, terminating at Civic Centre Station, in what is now Garema Place. The station included loop sidings and a platform with room for eight four-wheeled vehicles.

On Wednesday 26 July 1922, a flood on the Molonglo River washed away the legs on the trestle bridge, leaving the bridge deck suspended by the rails and sagging into the water. The bridge remnants were removed entirely during the city clean up in preparation for the arrival of the Duke of York for the opening of parliament in 1927. The removal of the bridge left a locomotive and rake of railway trucks stranded on the City side of the Commonwealth railway, meaning another temporary bridge over the Molonglo river had to be constructed for their safe return to Kingston.

The tracks along the Kingston to Civic Centre line were removed in March 1940 due to wartime demands for iron, though this was not seen as permanent closure of the rail corridor. A map of Canberra published in December 1940, nine months after the rails were removed, shows the planned railway route from present day Fyshwick, deviating south to Narrabundah along Kootara Crescent, then north over the Causeway to the City via Russell. From Braddon, the line was planned to extend northwards along present-day Lonsdale Street, parallel to Northbourne Avenue. In 1946 the Braddon Progress and Welfare Association called for the North Canberra railway to be re-established, noting that people has purchased property on the north-side of Canberra on the understanding that a railway would be provided. The Association further noted that construction of a railway from Canberra to Yass was an ultimate objective of the Canberra plan.

In February 1950 the Minister for the Interior announced the National Capital Planning and Development Committee (a predecessor to the NCA) had abandoned plans for a Canberra City railway, noting there were distinct disadvantages in having a railway in the centre of a city's development 'from a modern point of view', such as the undesirability of level crossings and the cost of cuttings to avoid these. Having carefully considered the 'railway problem', the NCPDC advised there was 'no necessity to provide for a railway route within the City', and the reserved railway corridor should be developed for other purposes. The Government was quick to act on the decision and by March that year proposals to convert the Railway Reserve between Cooyong Street and Girrahween Street to minor industrial leases were criticised by residents of neighbouring Torrens Street who wanted to preserve pine trees along the corridor as open space. The Railway Reserve in Braddon was reclassified as a road and named Lonsdale Street by June. By 1953 the City end of the railway corridor was being sold off for retail and business development along the newly constructed Garema Place and Bunda Street, both of which were Gazetted in October 1952.

Such was the rush to remove the railway in favour of lucrative land sales, sections of remnant tracks were simply paved over. A decade after the Canberra City railway was abandoned by the NCPDC, workers unearthed railway tracks while constructing Ainslie Avenue near City Square (now Civic Square) in January 1961. In the early 1970s rails were unearthed during construction of the extension of the Griffin Centre, which at the time stood on the corner of Bunda and Genge Streets.

==== Brickworks tramway ====
A narrow gauge 1,067-millimetre line ran from the Yarralumla brickworks, which opened in 1913, to the Kingston Powerhouse via the site of Old Parliament House. The line passed along Adelaide Avenue and round the north of State Circle. A branch went to the Hotel Canberra. The brickworks tramway was extended to Civic by 1916. It crossed the Molonglo River on a bridge near Scotts Crossing. The older 4 ft 8 1/2 in (1,435 mm) track was reduced to the 3 1/2 feet (1.1 m) by shifting one rail. The tramway terminated at Civic Centre station. The tramway was dismantled on 9 May 1927 as a cleanup for the opening of Parliament House.

=== Regional ===
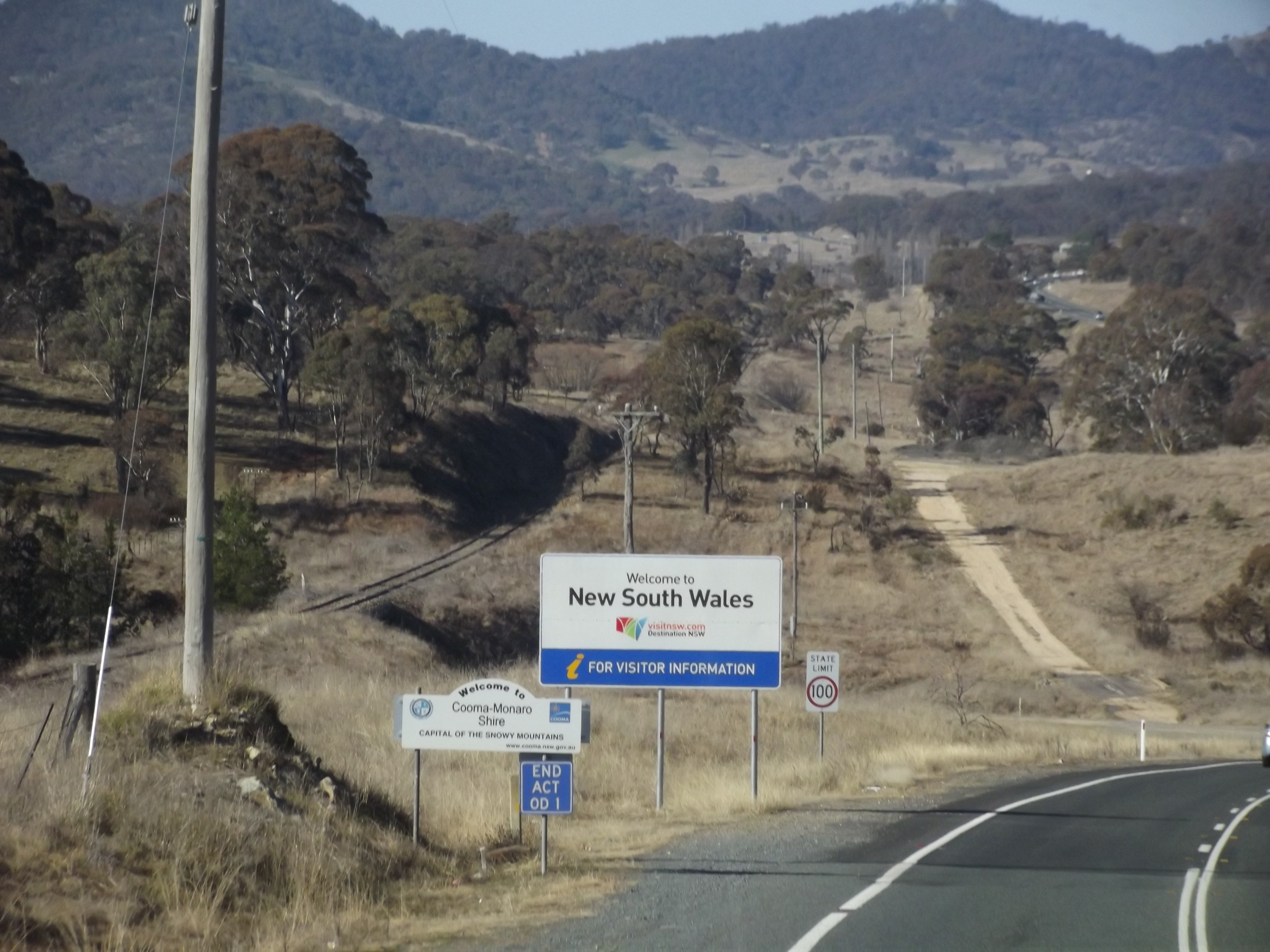
The Bombala line as it enters New South Wales

The Commonwealth branch line to Canberra from Queanbeyan opened to goods traffic on Monday 25 May 1914. Construction of the 8.5-kilometre (5.3 mi) rail link had commenced in March 1913, but was delayed due to a lack of railway sleepers. Construction recommenced in November and was completed in February 1914. By 1916, the railway had been extended across the future site of Lake Burley Griffin, to the site of the Sydney and Melbourne Buildings. The project was managed, and operated by the New South Wales Public Works Department on behalf of the Government of Australia.

In February 1916, just two years after the railway had been completed, flooding badly damaged the railway between Canberra and Queanbeyan, with rails and rail embankments washed away. The rail bridge over the Molonglo River was also destroyed.

Canberra Eastlake station opened on 21 April 1924, a decade after the goods railway. Passenger services had run between the Kingston Powerhouse and Queanbeyan for around six months prior to the station building opening. That service started on 15 October 1923, with two trains on weekdays to the Powerhouse (stopping at Molonglo siding) from Queanbeyan departing 6.45am and 3.45pm, returning 9.15am and 5.15pm and a 6.45am Saturday service, returning at 12.45pm.

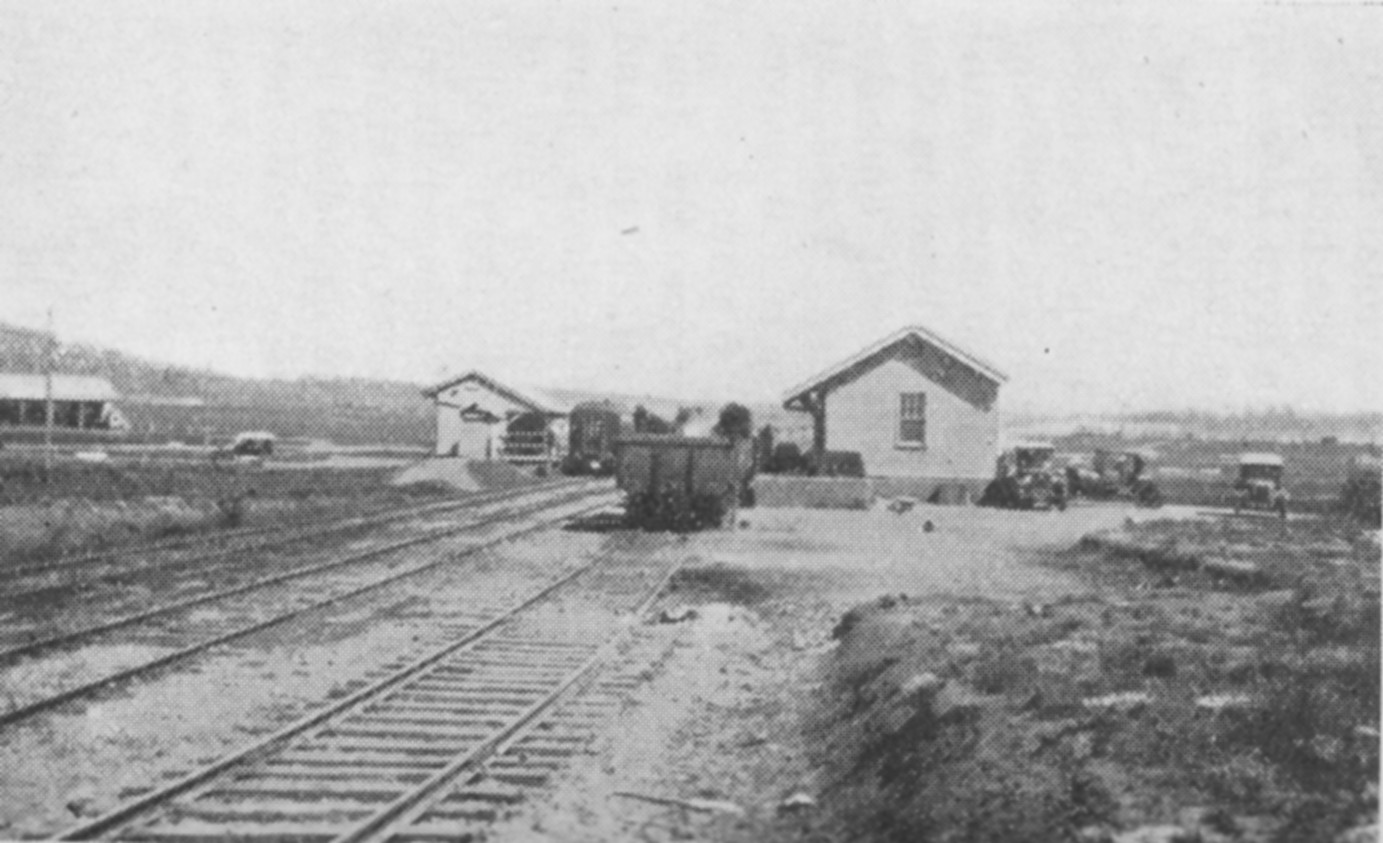
Canberra station in 1929

Railway services were re-modelled with a new timetable in March 1927, ahead of the Federal Parliament moving to Canberra. A night through train to Sydney was introduced, with carriages departing from Canberra Eastlake station being attached to the Cooma Mail at Goulburn. A daily rail motor service connected passengers from Canberra with the lunchtime train to Sydney, also at Goulburn. Morning and evening trains also connected Canberra with Queanbeyan. In September through carriages from Melbourne were introduced, with Canberra-bound sleepers detached at Goulburn and shunted to the Capital. By the end of 1927, six trains were arriving at Canberra on weekdays. The station came under the control of the Commonwealth Railways at this time.

In September 1936, a new fast weekday service commenced from Sydney to Canberra, the Federal City Express. The service cut journey times to just 5 hours 59 minutes. At that time Senator Guthrie labelled the Goulburn-Canberra railway as the slowest in the British Empire.

The Canberra-Monaro Express replaced the Federal Capital Express when it came into daily service on 9 May 1955. The diesel-hauled air conditioned four-carriage train cut an hour off the travel time between Sydney and Canberra compared to the steam-hauled Federal City Express. The four-car train would divide at Queanbeyan with two carriages going to Canberra and two to Cooma.

A new terminus was opened by the Minister for Transport & Shipping, Gordon Freeth on 26 October 1966. Built at a cost of $160,000, it was intended to be another temporary solution until a new, permanent home for railway opened closer to the airport "somewhere in the Pialligo area".

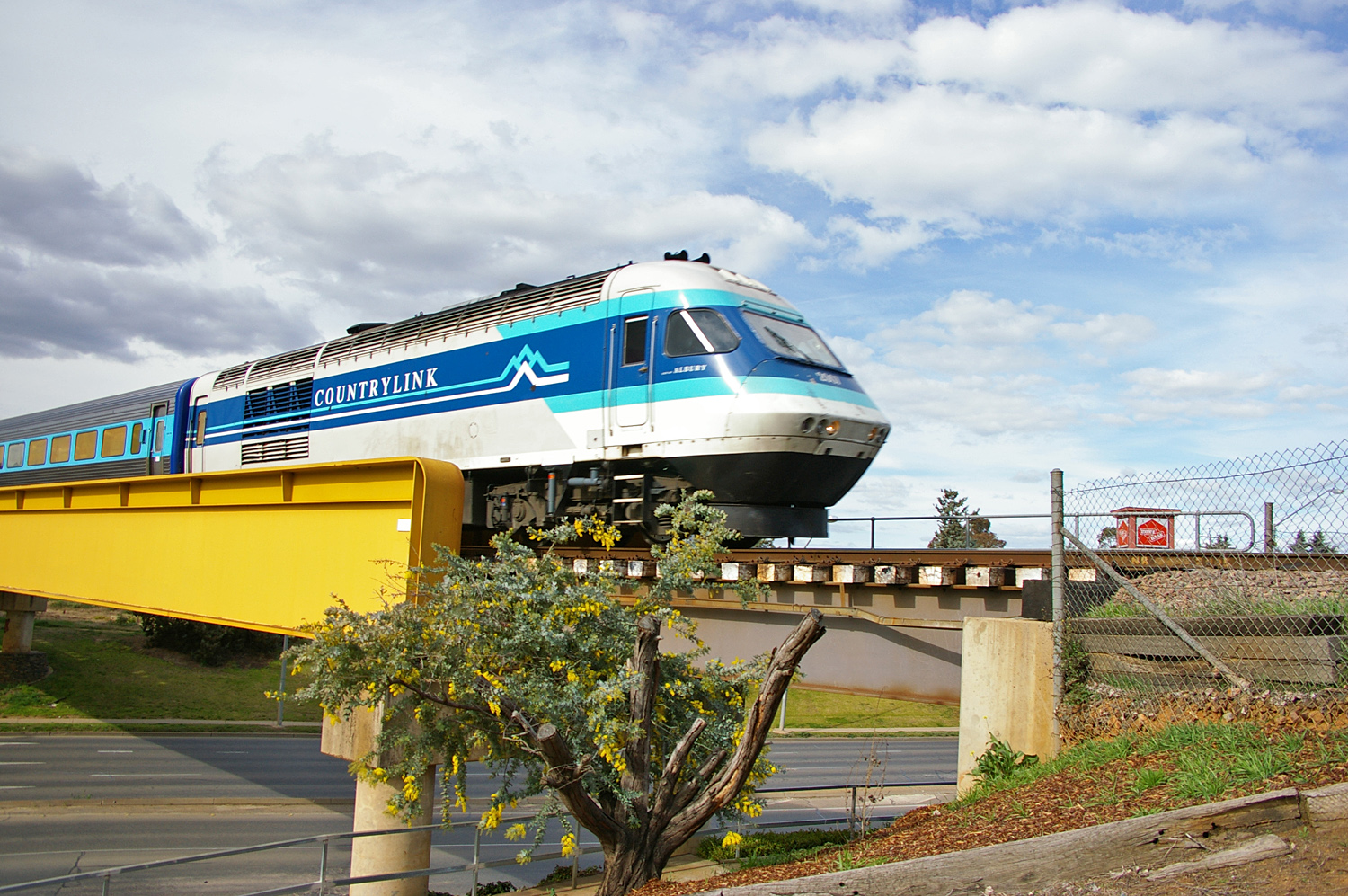
Canberra was served by XPTs for six and a half years.

Following trials in 1982, the high performance XPT train sets came into operation from Canberra station in August 1983, with a day return service to Sydney, the Canberra Express. The scheduled journey time was 4 hours 15 minutes, a reduction of 35 minutes from the previous service.

The line to Queanbeyan was owned and staffed by the Commonwealth Railways and later Australian National although services were always operated by the New South Wales Government Railways and its successors. Despite numerous attempts to transfer the loss making line to the Government of New South Wales, it remained in Federal Government hands until May 1985 when it was transferred to the State Rail Authority.

The final Canberra Monaro Express departed Canberra station for Cooma on Saturday 26 November 1988. The cancellation of the service also removed the evening service from Canberra to Sydney, and was part of state-wide rail cuts in regional areas. NSW Minister for Transport Bruce Baird noted that passengers has been putting up with 'poor travelling conditions and deteriorating carriages'. Withdrawn services were replaced with road coaches.

After just six-and-a-half years in service, the last XPT train departed Canberra station for Sydney. Around 250 people crowded the platform on Friday 9 February 1990 as the train departed amid protest from regular train users and local politicians. State Rail cited falling passenger numbers for the cancellation of the XPT, which was replaced with a daily return service using older rolling stock that was around an hour slower.

In 1993, State Rail launched its new country flagship train fleet, the Xplorers, to replace the 'tired, rundown' system, with the first service arriving at Canberra station on Thursday 16 December. The Xplorer trains promised to cut 40 minutes off the Canberra-Sydney journey, bringing it back into line with times achieved 10 years earlier. NSW Minister for Transport, Bruce Baird, said the trains would be a 'major drawcard in attracting people back to rail services'. Within nine months the new trains and improved journey time had led to a 50 per cent increase in passenger numbers. Initially the Canberra-Sydney Xplorer trains were just two carriages, but were expanded to three carriages in 1995.

From 23 April 1995, the X 2000 tilt train ran between Canberra and Sydney for a seven-week trial. Two daily services ran in addition to the three daily Xplorer services, with a journey time 45 minutes shorter. The service departed at 10.45am and 6.30pm, arriving Sydney at 2.10pm and 9.58pm respectively.

In August 2017, NSW Deputy Premier John Barilaro announced the replacement of the state's entire regional rail fleet, including the Xplorer trains serving Canberra station. The Regional Rail programme will provide longer trains to replace XPT and Endeavour fleets (which will increase from 5 to 6 carriages and 2 to 3 respectively), however the new trains replacing Xplorer sets which service the Canberra to Sydney route will remain 3 carriages long despite these services being heavily booked, carrying more than 280,000 passengers per year.

The ACT Government announced plans in March 2023 to build a new multi-modal station next to the current terminal building as part of the Eastlake urban redevelopment. The plans include co-location of the Canberra Railway Museum and integration of a future light rail line.

== Light rail proposed but never built ==
In 1988, Comeng proposed a Light Rail system for Canberra. One line was proposed in three stages - Woden-City-Belconnen (about 18km), Woden-Tuggeranong (about 11.5km), and Belconnen-Kippax Centre (about 5.8km).

== Regional lines proposed but never built ==
=== Canberra to Yass ===
The building of a railway between Canberra and Yass was specified in the Seat of Government Acceptance Act 1909, and plans were made to extend the existing Canberra line to Yass in 1924 and 1934. A survey was completed in September 1965 for such a line. A map was released by the Department of Shipping and Transport in September that year, showing new tracks running from east of the existing station at Kingston northwards along the Majura Rd corridor, crossing the Federal Hwy near the present-day Horse Park Dr. The proposal was last considered by the government in 1971 but was not considered to be economically justified.

=== Canberra to Jervis Bay ===
A plan was also drawn for a Canberra to Jervis Bay line in 1914, which would connect Canberra with what was to be its port. As part of this scheme, a route was considered to link Yass to Canberra, and ultimately to Jervis Bay, around 1917. Little was heard of this project after 1921.

=== Canberra to Arsenal Town ===
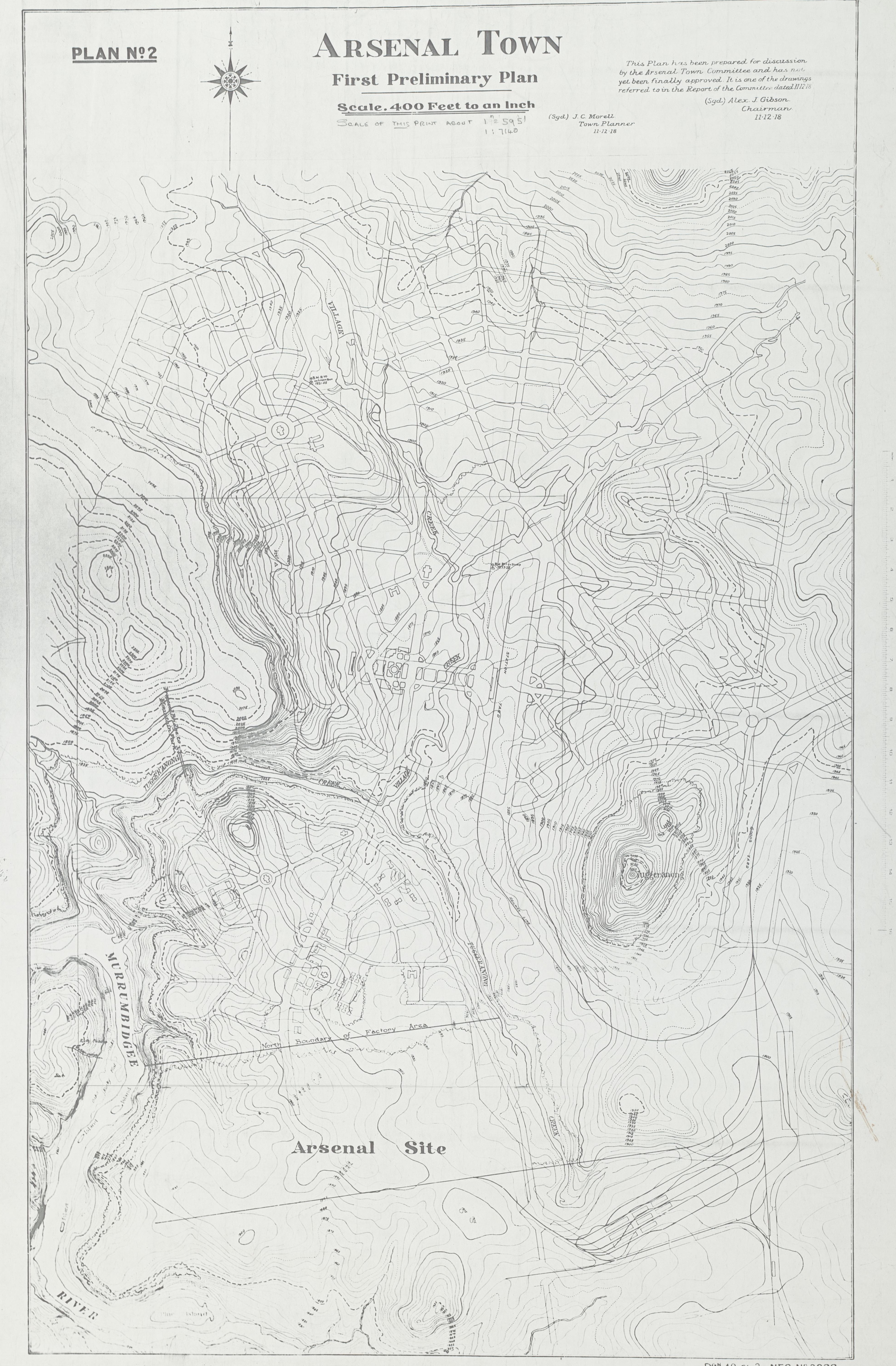
Canberra Arsenal Town 1918

On 8 November 1918, it was reported the Federal Parliament had approved a new railway to connect the new city of Canberra to a proposed garden suburb, Arsenal Town, in what is today the Tuggeranong Town Centre. The line would link Arsenal Town to the 'Goulburn to Nimmitabel' railway at point 5 miles south of Queanbeyan, in what is today known as Hume. At the time, plans were also being discussed to connect the line directly to Canberra and onwards to Yass. Arsenal Town was a planned garden suburb, designed by Walter Burley Griffin, to accommodate workers at a planned nearby munitions factory. Construction of Arsenal Town was superseded by the end of World War I on 11 November, the week after the railway was approved.

=== Canberra to Eden ===
The viability of a rail line from Canberra to Eden via Cooma was investigated after the NSW Government funded a $1 million study in 2018. The proposed route would include reinstating the majority of the disused Bombala line, extending 100 km (62 mi) to the coast at the southern end of the line and north 3.5 km (2.2 mi) from HMAS Harman to Canberra Airport. In October 2020, the viability study found the proposal would not be economically viable, given the costs associated with extending the line through challenging terrain to the coast.

=== Canberra Airport Rail Connector ===
The 2020 Canberra to Port of Eden Feasibility Study included the investigation of two railway routes that would connect Canberra International Airport to the Canberra to Sydney railway line. The Piallago Route would run from the east of Queanbeyan station, curving west to follow Piallago Avenue for approximately 7.5 km to a passenger terminal at the airport. The Beard route would curve north to the east of Fyshwick for approximately 4 km, also terminating on Piallago Avenue. Two other routes (Harman and Symonston) would connect to the Bombala line only, south of Queanbeyan.

== See also ==
- Canberra Railway Museum
- High-speed rail in Australia
- Rail transport in New South Wales
- Transport in Canberra
