= Z1243 =

Historic New South Wales rolling stock

1243
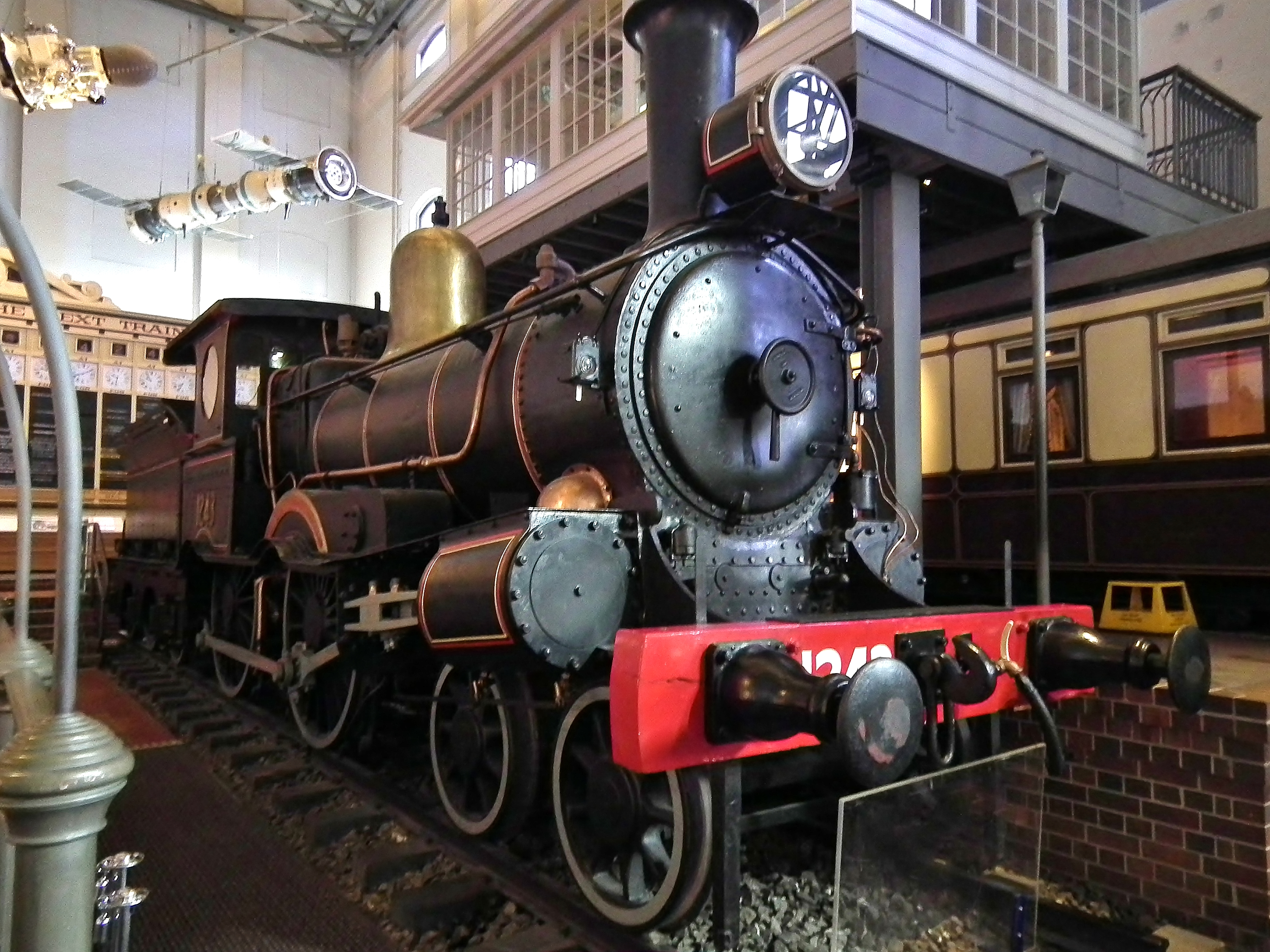
- 1243 at the Powerhouse Museum in Ultimo
Type and origin
- Power type: Steam
- Designer: Beyer, Peacock & Company
- Builder: Atlas Engineering Company
- Serial number: 2
- Build date: 1882
Specifications
- Configuration
  - Whyte: 4-4-0
- Gauge: 4 ft 8 1/2 in (1,435 mm) standard gauge
- Driver dia.: 5 ft 6 in (1,676 mm)
- Adhesive weight: 57,000–62,000 lb (26–28 t)
- Loco weight: 84,000–95,000 lb (38–43 t)
- Firebox
  - Grate area: 15 sq ft (1.4 m^{2})
- Boiler pressure: 130 psi (0.9 MPa) as built; 140 psi (1.0 MPa) later
- Heating surface: 1,070–1,120 sq ft (99–104 m^{2})
- Superheater: None
- Cylinders: 2 outside
- Cylinder size: 18 in × 24 in (460 mm × 610 mm)
Performance figures
- Tractive effort: 13,019–14,020 lbf (57.9–62.4 kN)
Career
- Operators: New South Wales Government Railways
- Disposition: On static display

1243 is a preserved former New South Wales Government Railways Z12 class steam locomotive. Built in 1882 by Atlas Engineering Company, Sydney, it is on static display at the Powerhouse Museum.

== History ==
During the 1870s, the Government of New South Wales came under pressure to provide work for colonial industry and the manufacture of railway locomotives was investigated. The Department of Public Works, Railway Branch awarded a contract for construction of engines based on a pattern engine and design drawings supplied by the Railway Branch. At that time, it was the largest single manufacturing order in Australia.

Trials of the first locomotive produced at Atlas Engineering Company commenced on 11 January 1882. Locomotive 1243 was completed the following week with the only imported components of the engine being the steel axles and wheels.

1243 entered service as an express locomotive working passenger and mail mainline services throughout the state, although it was later relegated to other services towards the end of its service life.

== Preservation ==
By 1954, only ten of the original 68 Z12 class engines remained in service.

In 1955, the locomotive was restored to its original livery for the NSW Railways centenary celebrations at Sydney Central station and for special 'Vintage Train’ excursions run by the New South Wales Government Railways throughout the state in company with 1210. In 1958, 1219 was originally set aside for the Powerhouse Museum transport collection, but later replaced with 1243.

In 1969, a repainted 1243 in its green livery was used in making the 1970 film Ned Kelly running on the closed Captains Flat railway line with buildings simulating Glenrowan railway station.

In April 1981 it was displayed at the Sydney Royal Easter Show at the Sydney Showground as part of a State Rail Authority exhibition.

Until 1982, 1243 was an operational exhibit for the New South Wales Rail Transport Museum when it was restored to original condition with short smokebox and low-side tender. In September 1987, 1243 was placed on permanent display at the Powerhouse Museum in Ultimo, Sydney.
