= New South Wales Z13 class locomotive =

Class of 4-4-2T steam locomotives operated in Australia

New South Wales Z13 class
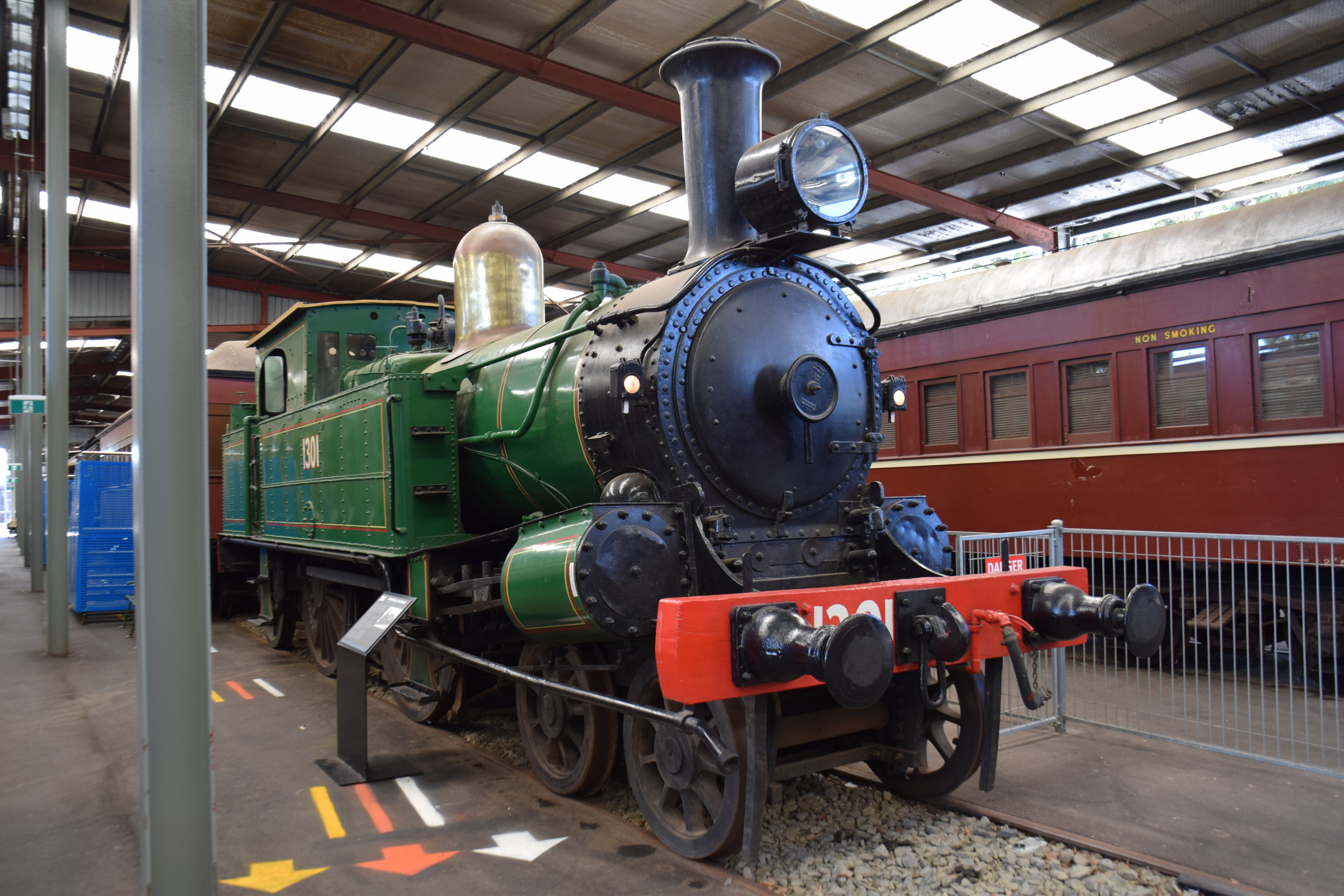
- 1301 at the New South Wales Railway Museum, Thirlmere
Type and origin
- Power type: Steam
- Rebuild date: 1896–1902
- Number rebuilt: 20
Specifications
- Configuration
  - Whyte: 4-4-2T
  - UIC: 2′B1′nt
- Gauge: 4 ft 8 1/2 in (1,435 mm) standard gauge
- Driver dia.: 5 ft 6 in (1.676 m)
- Adhesive weight: 66,000 lb (29,900 kg)
- Loco weight: 110,000 lb (49,900 kg)
- Firebox
  - Grate area: 15 sq ft (1.4 m^{2})
- Boiler pressure: 140 psi (970 kPa)
- Heating surface: 1,075 sq ft (99.9 m^{2})
- Cylinders: 2 outside
- Cylinder size: 18 in × 24 in (457 mm × 610 mm)
- Train brakes: air
Performance figures
- Tractive effort: 14,020 lbf (62.4 kN)
Career
- Operators: New South Wales Government Railways
- Numbers: As built: 79, 81, 88–92, 123, 157, 172–174, 182, 411, 415; From 1924: 1301–1316
- Preserved: 1301, 1307, 1308
- Disposition: 3 preserved, 17 scrapped

The Z13 class is a class of 4-4-2T steam locomotives operated by the New South Wales Government Railways of Australia.

== History ==
Due to a shortage of suburban engines in the Sydney area and the availability of surplus C79 class tender engines, it was decided to experimentally convert one of the tender locomotives to a tank type engine in 1896. The conversion proved successful and a further 19 had been converted at Eveleigh Railway Workshops by 1902.

Following the delivery of C30 class locomotives from 1903, they were transferred to Newcastle suburban traffic and when replaced there, were allocated minor roles such as working the Carlingford, Morpeth and Warren branches. Two were sold to East Greta Mining & Railway Company, one to Ashtonfields Colliery, Thornton and a fourth scrapped.

As part of the 1924 reclassification scheme, the remaining 16 were reclassified as the Z13 class and renumbered 1301 to 1316. In later years, their main duties were working of the Ballina branch, the Picton to Mittagong Loop line, the Yass Town branch and school trains on the North Coast line from Coffs Harbour to Kempsey and Casino to Border Loop.

== Preservation ==
Three have been preserved:

- 1301 by the NSW Rail Museum, initially at Enfield Locomotive Depot, then Thirlmere from 1975
- 1307 by the New South Wales Transport Museum, initially at Enfield Locomotive Depot, then Thirlmere from 1975, transferred to Yass Railway Heritage Centre (at Yass Town railway station) in 1999
- 1308 by the New South Wales Transport Museum, initially at Enfield Locomotive Depot, then Thirlmere from 1975, transferred to Valley Heights
