= Z1210 =

Historic New South Wales rolling stock

1210
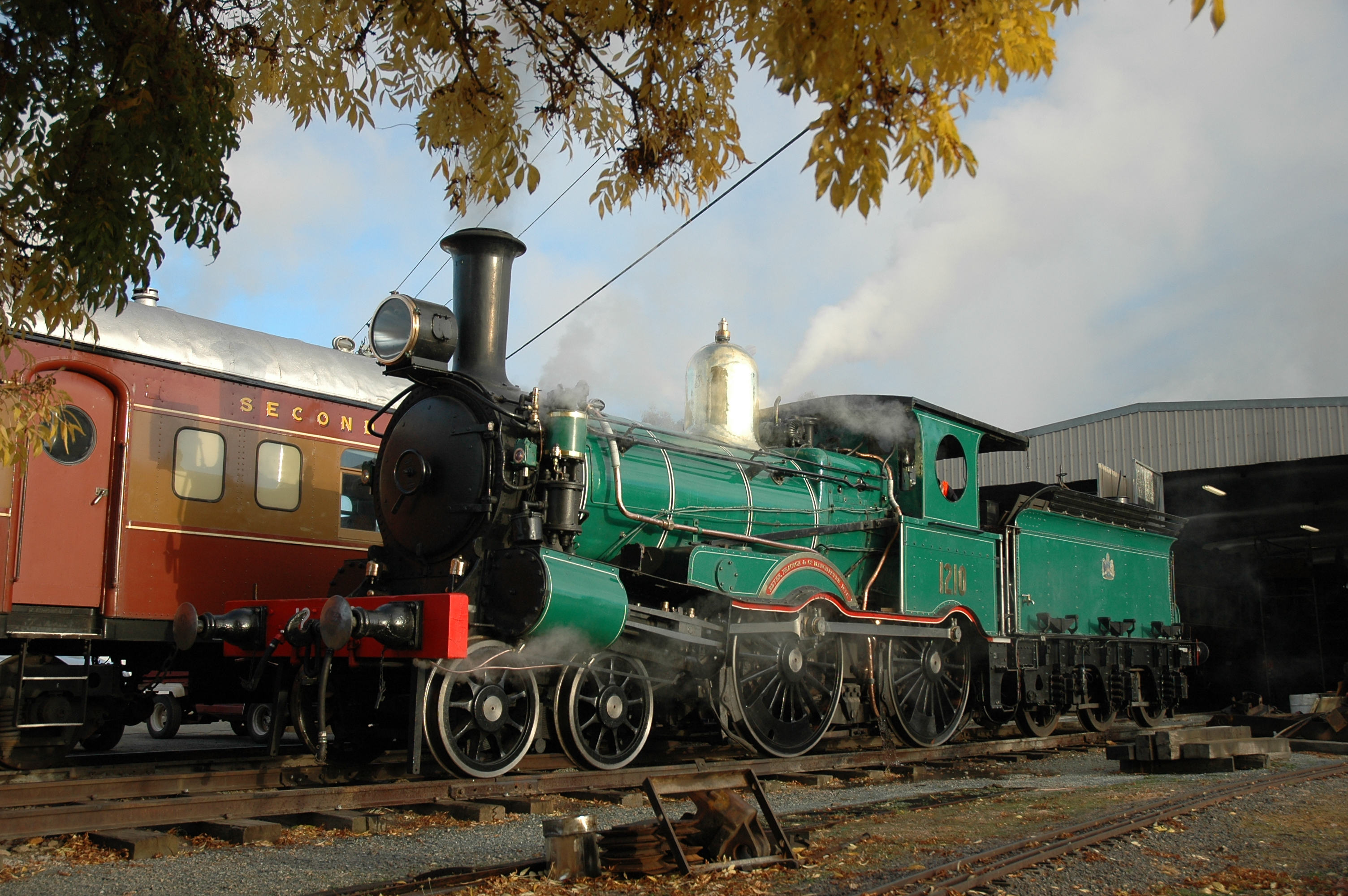
- 1210 displayed outside the Canberra Railway Museum
Type and origin
- Power type: Steam
- Builder: Beyer, Peacock & Company
- Serial number: 1767
- Build date: 1878
Specifications
- Configuration
  - Whyte: 4-4-0
- Gauge: 4 ft 8 1/2 in (1,435 mm) standard gauge
- Driver dia.: 5 ft 6 in (1,676 mm)
- Adhesive weight: 57,000–62,000 lb (26–28 t)
- Loco weight: 84,000–95,000 lb (38–43 t)
- Firebox
  - Grate area: 15 sq ft (1.4 m^{2})
- Boiler pressure: 130 psi (0.9 MPa) as built; 140 psi (1.0 MPa) later
- Heating surface: 1,070–1,120 sq ft (99–104 m^{2})
- Superheater: None
- Cylinders: 2 outside
- Cylinder size: 18 in × 24 in (460 mm × 610 mm)
Performance figures
- Tractive effort: 13,019–14,020 lbf (57.9–62.4 kN)
Career
- Operators: New South Wales Government Railways
- Disposition: Preserved

1210 is a preserved former New South Wales Government Railways Z12 class steam locomotive. Built in 1878 by Beyer, Peacock & Company, England, it is preserved at the Canberra Railway Museum.

== History ==
1210 was built in 1878 by Beyer, Peacock & Company, Manchester. It arrived in Sydney and began its working life as No. 120 on the southern and western lines.

After 15 years service the locomotive was transferred to Penrith and in 1896 it was transferred to the far north-west of NSW.

The locomotive was returned to Sydney in 1912 and in 1914 moved to Goulburn, where it hauled trains on the Bombala line to Queanbeyan. On 25 May 1914, it hauled the first revenue-earning train into Canberra. This was the coal train that served the main Canberran electricity generation station.

The re-classification of NSW engines gave the engine number 1210 post 1924 and worked in the Parkes and Mudgee districts.

== Demise and preservation ==
In 1932, 1210 was declared obsolete and withdrawn from service but not scrapped due to a shortage of engines and in 1935 assigned to Moree to haul local branch line trains. In 1943 the engine was again withdrawn from service but due to war-time pressure on the railways returned to service. In 1947 the engine was returned to Parkes for use as a relief or emergency engine. It continued in use until 1958 when it was finally withdrawn from service.

In 1955 for the centenary of rail operations in New South Wales, with sister locomotive 1243 hauled the Vintage Train across the state for railway celebrations.

On 31 October 1959 the NSW Steam Tram and Railway Preservation Society hired the locomotive to haul a train from Sydney to Canberra for the dedication of All Saints Anglican Church, Canberra. Bruce Macdonald and the society successfully appealed to the National Capital Development Commission and the Department of Railways to assist in the locomotive's preservation.

On 27 January 1962, 1210 in company with 1243 left Sydney hauling a special service to Canberra for the formal presentation ceremony. It was placed on display on a floodlight plinth outside the Canberra railway station. The Australian Railway Historical Society obtained permission to clean and polish 1210 while plinthed and subsequently relocated to the Canberra Railway Museum in 1984.

The locomotive was restored to operational condition with Australian Bicentennial Authority funds and restored to operational condition in September 1988. The following month it ran to Melbourne to participate in Aus Steam '88.

In the early 2010s, 1210 underwent mechanical and boiler works in the hope it could be back in steam for the Centenary of Rail to Canberra in May 2014. This restoration has stalled due to the ARHS ACT Division being placed into liquidation in November 2016. Following the wind up of ARHS ACT Division, the Canberra Railway Museum was established as a new entity with a smaller collection of assets, retaining the more significant items with connections to the ACT and surrounding region. This included 1210 as the centrepiece of the collection. Hopes to have it running by Easter 2018 were dashed following parts such as copper boiler tubes being stolen. The parts have never been recovered.

Volunteers at the new Canberra Railway Museum reassembled as much as possible of the locomotive for static display. In August 2023 the Museum was successful in winning an ACT Heritage Grant for development of a Conservation Management Plan for the restoration of the locomotive, which is listed on the ACT Heritage Register.
