= Canberra Railway Museum =

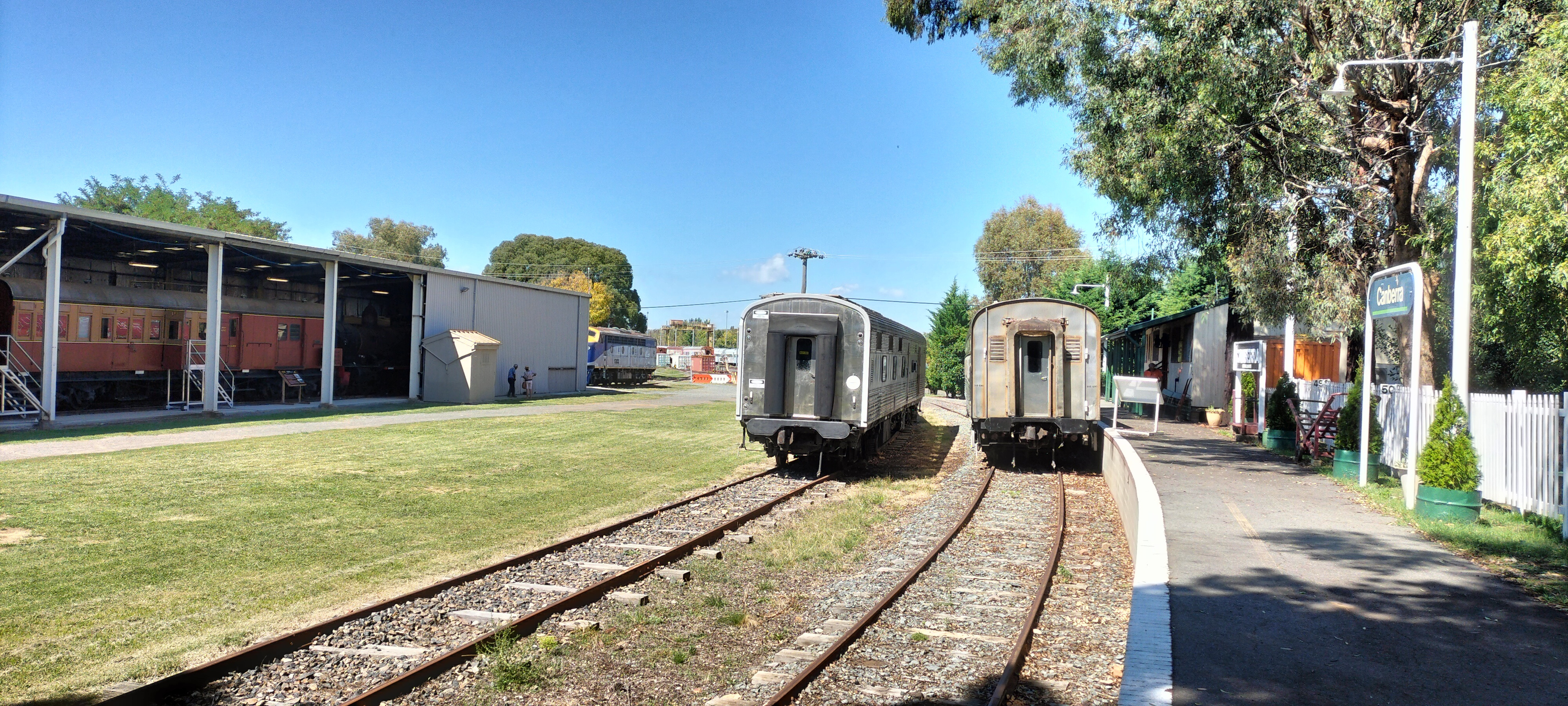
- Established: 1985; 41 years ago
- Location: Geijera Place, Kingston, Canberra
- Coordinates: 35.318°S 149.155°E
- Type: Railway museum
- Public transit access: Canberra railway station
- Parking: On site
- Website: www.canberrarail.org.au

The Canberra Railway Museum is located at Kingston in the Australian Capital Territory (ACT) next to Canberra railway station on the Bombala railway line. Since 2018, Canberra Railway Museum has been the trading name of a not-for-profit company, Capital Region Heritage Rail Limited, established to run the museum. ACT Heritage Rail Holdings Limited has been the company responsible for safeguarding the heritage assets of the museum.

Under ownership of the former ACT Division of the Australian Railway Historical Society (ARHS), the museum housed locomotives, passenger cars, freight cars, track machinery and railway memorabilia. Some locomotives and rolling stock were operated outside the ACT on tours for the paying public. Notable among the assets were no. 1210 of the New South Wales Government Railways, built in 1878: Australia's oldest operating steam locomotive and one of the world's oldest mainline steam locomotives. Australia's most powerful steam locomotive, former New South Wales Beyer, Garratt articulated steam locomotive 6029, was also held.

== History ==
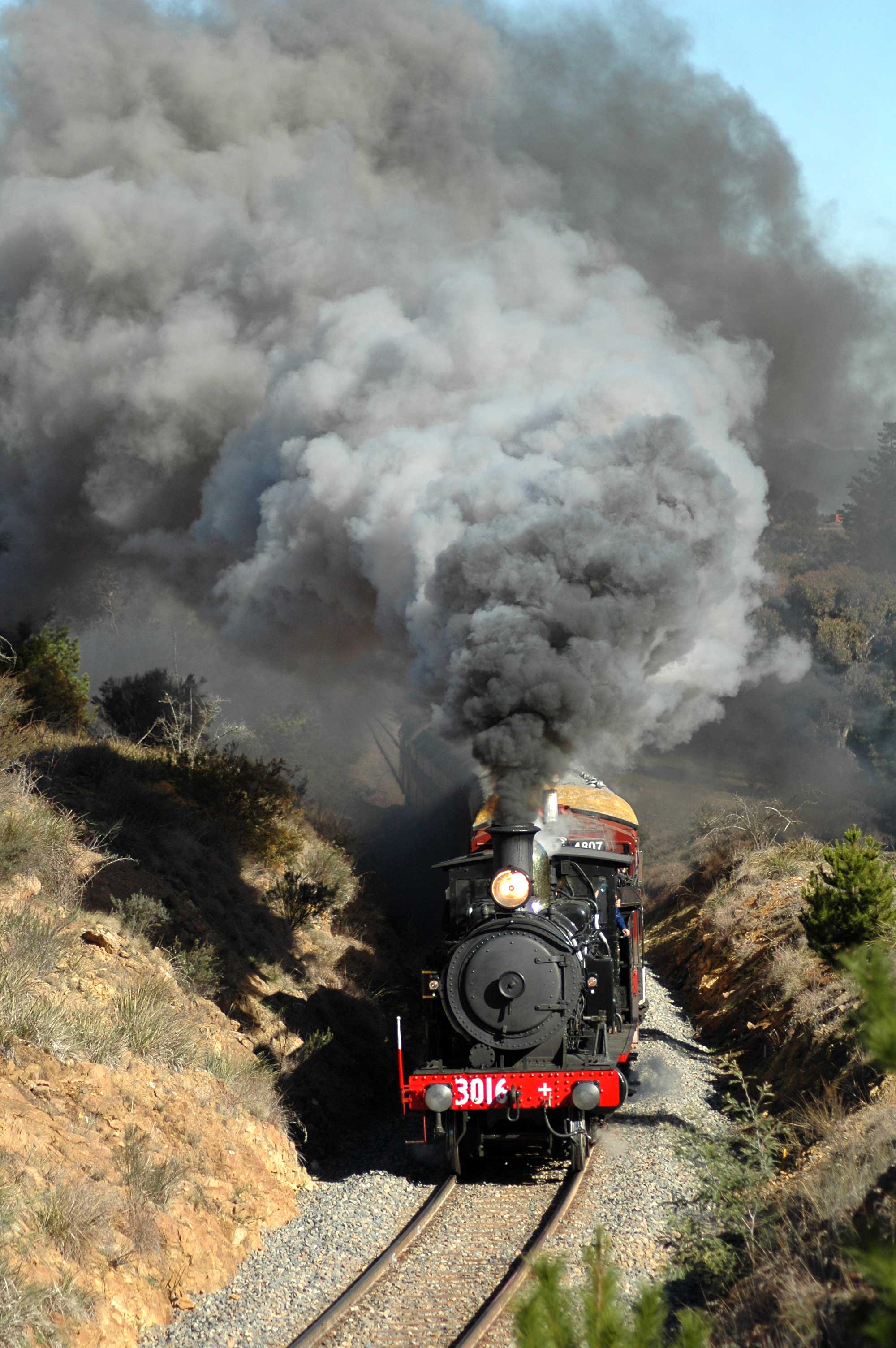
3016

Between 1967 and 2016, the museum had been owned by the ACT Division of the ARHS. In November 2016, the museum closed after the society's freight company collapsed with more than $700,000 of debt, and the ACT Division of the ARHS was placed into liquidation. About two-thirds of the museum's assets were auctioned in August 2017. In December 2017, a break-in and vandalism occurred at the closed museum. In May 2018, two new not-for-profit companies were established, one to run the museum, the other safeguarding the heritage assets.

== First incarnation ==
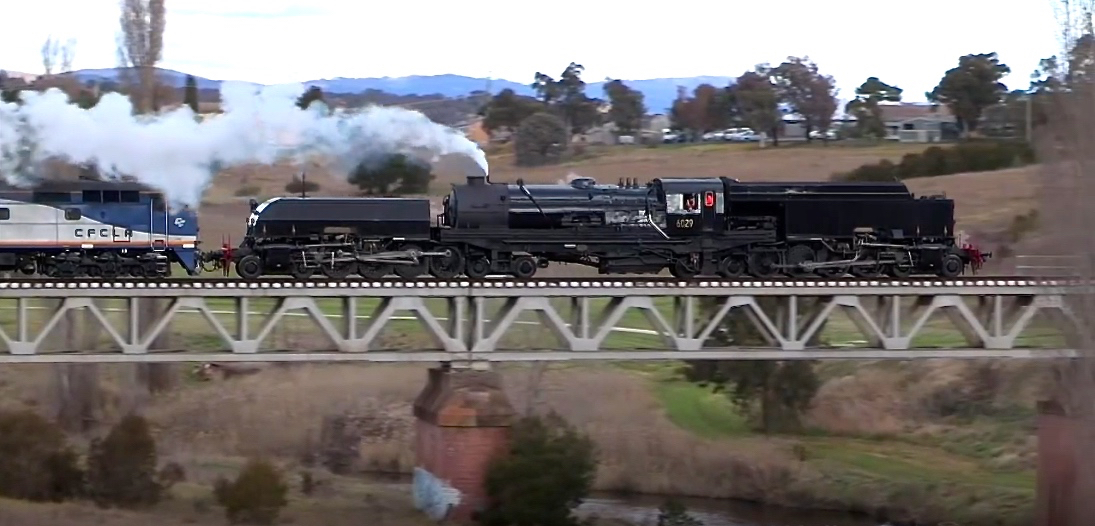
Beyer, Garratt locomotive no. 6029 hauling a load test train over the Queanbeyan River bridge in 2014

Since its establishment in 1967 and for the following 49 years, the ARHS ACT Division had the aim of preserving railway history, particularly that of Canberra and the southern districts of New South Wales, for the enjoyment and enlightenment of present and future generations. Progressive development of the museum since its inception in 1985 – when the ACT's population was only 250,000 – involved a mainly volunteer workforce collecting and restoring locomotives, rolling stock and railway memorabilia; preserving and recording railway history; and operating trains with restored rolling stock. Establishing the museum in the former Commonwealth Railways marshalling yard at Kingston fulfilled the essential need to be in a rail environment with access to the commercial rail network. At times some financial assistance was provided, initially by the Australian Government and subsequently the ACT Government, in recognition of the museum activities' value to the community.

In 2007, the Australian Capital Territory Legislative Assembly formally recognised the importance of rail heritage to the ACT and the significant contribution made by the Canberra Railway Museum.

In the 2010s, Espee, a commercial arm was formed operating services for Access Recycling with CFCLA locomotives. It also operated infrastructure trains for the Australian Rail Track Corporation.

In November 2016, the museum was suddenly closed after Espee, which had been started up to subsidise popular but expensive heritage train trips, collapsed with more than $700,000 of debt. The ACT Division of the ARHS was placed into liquidation.

The significant heritage value to the people of Canberra of the museum being sited on the original Commonwealth Railways land was recognised by the ACT Heritage Council when on 1 June 2017 it decided to register the City Railway Remnants in Kingston on the ACT Heritage Register.

In July 2017, in the face of protests from heritage conservationists and Canberra citizens, it was announced that the museum's historic collection would go to auction on 2 August. Subsequently, some assets, including steam locomotive 3016, diesel locomotives, railmotors CPH27 and CPH37, and rolling stock, were stored or lent to Transport Heritage NSW, Thirlmere. Others were sold to private owners, including locomotive no. 6029, which returned to hauling heritage tours on various lines in New South Wales.

In December 2017, a major break-in and vandalism occurred at the closed museum site. Many heritage items suffered significant damage and theft, including most notably many valuable parts of ACT listed heritage asset, steam locomotive no. 1210.

== Re-establishment ==
Following the vandalism and theft, some Canberra residents and railway enthusiasts decided "to do something to try and salvage some future for heritage rail in the ACT". In May 2018, two new not-for-profit companies were incorporated:

- Capital Region Heritage Rail Limited to focus on running the Canberra Railway Museum
- ACT Heritage Rail Holdings Limited to be responsible for safeguarding the heritage assets.

Members of the Canberra Railway Museum become members of both organisations and elect different directors to each company.

Capital Region Heritage Rail Limited was registered with the Australian Charities and Not-for-profits Commission (ACNC) to operate in both the Australian Capital Territory and New South Wales under sub-type 2014, Advancing Culture.

The vision of Capital Region Heritage Rail Limited is "To protect the valuable Heritage Rail Assets in our care whilst refocusing the Canberra Railway Museum activities towards its core purpose for the benefit of the Canberra / Capital region and its people."

The directors of the company stated in their first annual report of June 2018 that they "have maintained a clear focus on the protection of the assets and our people, as well as maintaining strong financial discipline. Work, Health and Safety has been a key part of this focus, with both the broad policy and more detailed site procedures now in place". They also stated that "While the final transfer of some assets is dependent on the liquidator obtaining court approval as part of the finalisation of his work, recent developments have seen the company gain effective control of both the museum site and the valuable heritage assets. While the long term occupancy of the Kingston site remains to be formalised the message coming from Government is encouraging."

== Museum exhibits ==
A complete list of exhibits as of November 2020 can be found in this PDF file. Another list is also on their website. Some of the exhibits before 2016 were as follows.

Steam locomotives
No.	Description	Manufacturer	Year	Location	Status	Ref
1210	4-4-0 passenger	Beyer, Peacock & Company	1878	Canberra	Static display (was in repairs before the ARHS ACT Division was liquidated)
3013	4-6-4T passenger	Beyer, Peacock & Company	1903	Canberra	Stored, Privately Owned	3013 Blog Page
3016	4-6-0 mixed traffic	Beyer, Peacock & Company	1903	Canberra	Under restoration	3016 Blog Page
3102	4-6-0 mixed traffic	Beyer, Peacock & Company	1912	Canberra	Stored, Privately Owned	3102 Blog Page

=== Diesel locomotives and railmotors ===
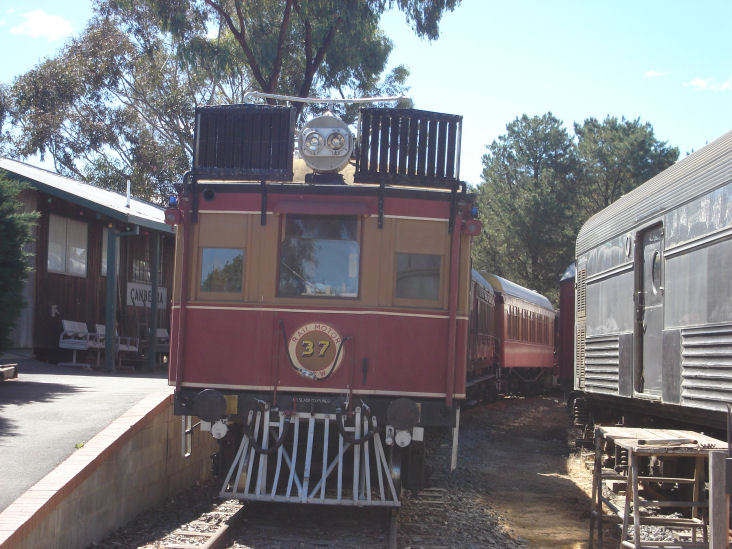
CPH railmotor no. 37 at the museum platform next to a modern stainless steel car used on the ARHS ACT Division's long-haul tours

Former NSWGR diesel-electric locomotive 4403, which had been restored to operational condition at Junee, hauled tour trains, including lengthy trips, until the ARHS ACT Division went into liquidation. It then became part of the Transport Heritage NSW collection in the custody of the NSW Rail Museum at Thirlmere.

Diesel-electric locomotive 4807 – rated at 1050 hp with a Co-Co wheel arrangement – also became part of the Transport Heritage NSW collection in the custody of the NSW Rail Museum at Thirlmere.

Diesel-electric locomotive D25 (400 hp Bo-Bo), formerly owned by Australian Iron & Steel, was the yard shunter at the Canberra Railway Museum. It is now privately owned.

Diesel-mechanical locomotive X203 (260 hp Bo) rail tractor. It is now held by the Yass Railway Museum.

Three diesel-hydraulic railmotors (CPH 13, CPH 27 and CPH 37), and one other (CPH 2), are on loan to another organisation. CPH 13 was to have been transferred to the Oberon Tarana Heritage Railway after restoration at Goulburn Roundhouse.

=== Carriages ===
The extensive collection of carriages, including end-platform cars, sleeping cars and special purpose passenger cars, was widely dispersed after the ARHS ACT Division was liquidated.

== See also ==
- Railways in Canberra
