= Yass Town railway station =

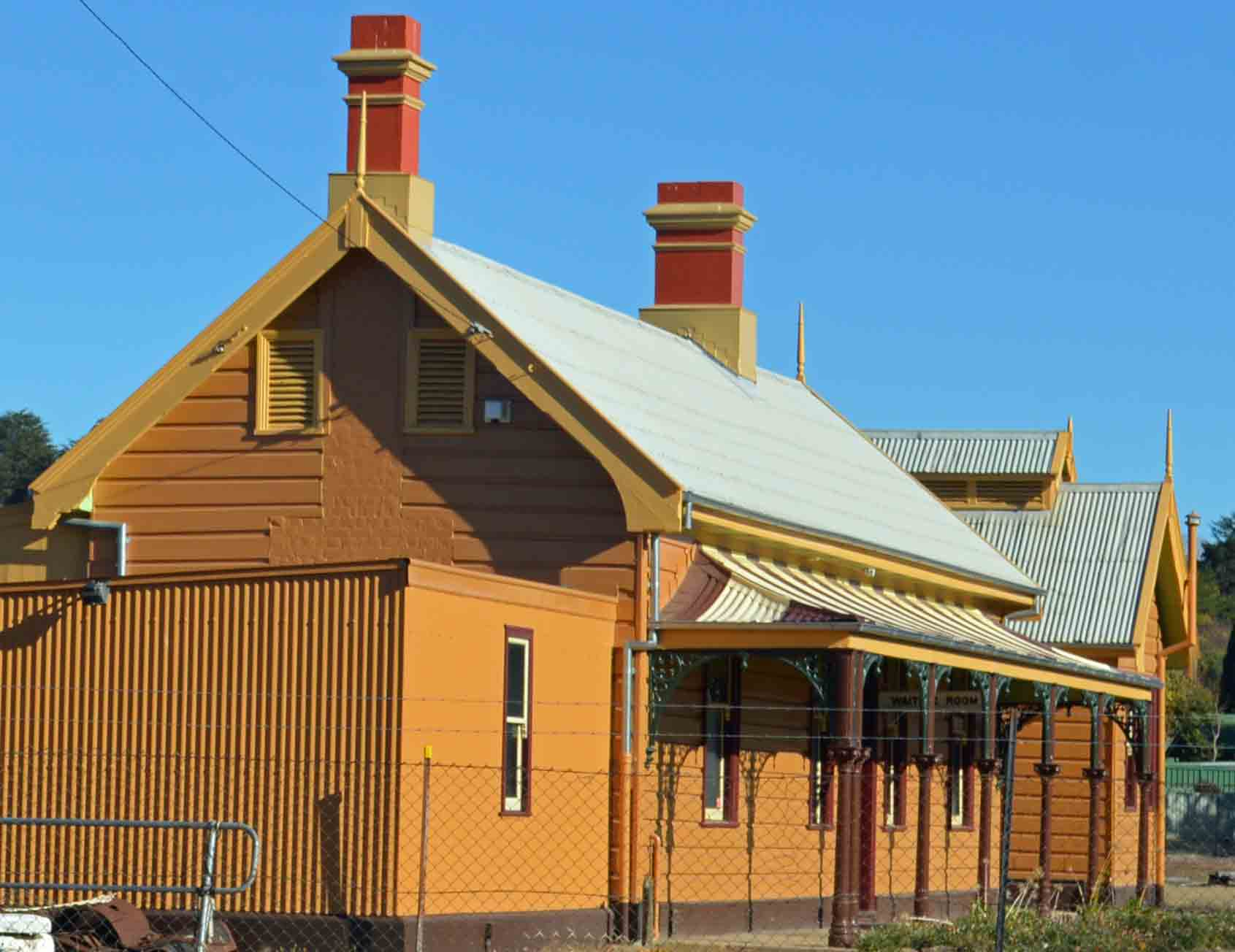

- Location within New South Wales Location within Australia
- 34.8445°S 148.9111°E
- Location: Yass Town Tramway, Yass, Yass Valley Shire, New South Wales, Australia

Site notes
- Owner: Transport Asset Manager of New South Wales

New South Wales Heritage Register
- Official name: Yass Town Railway Station and yard group
- Type: state heritage (complex / group)
- Designated: 2 April 1999
- Reference no.: 1293
- Type: Railway Platform/Station
- Category: Transport – Rail

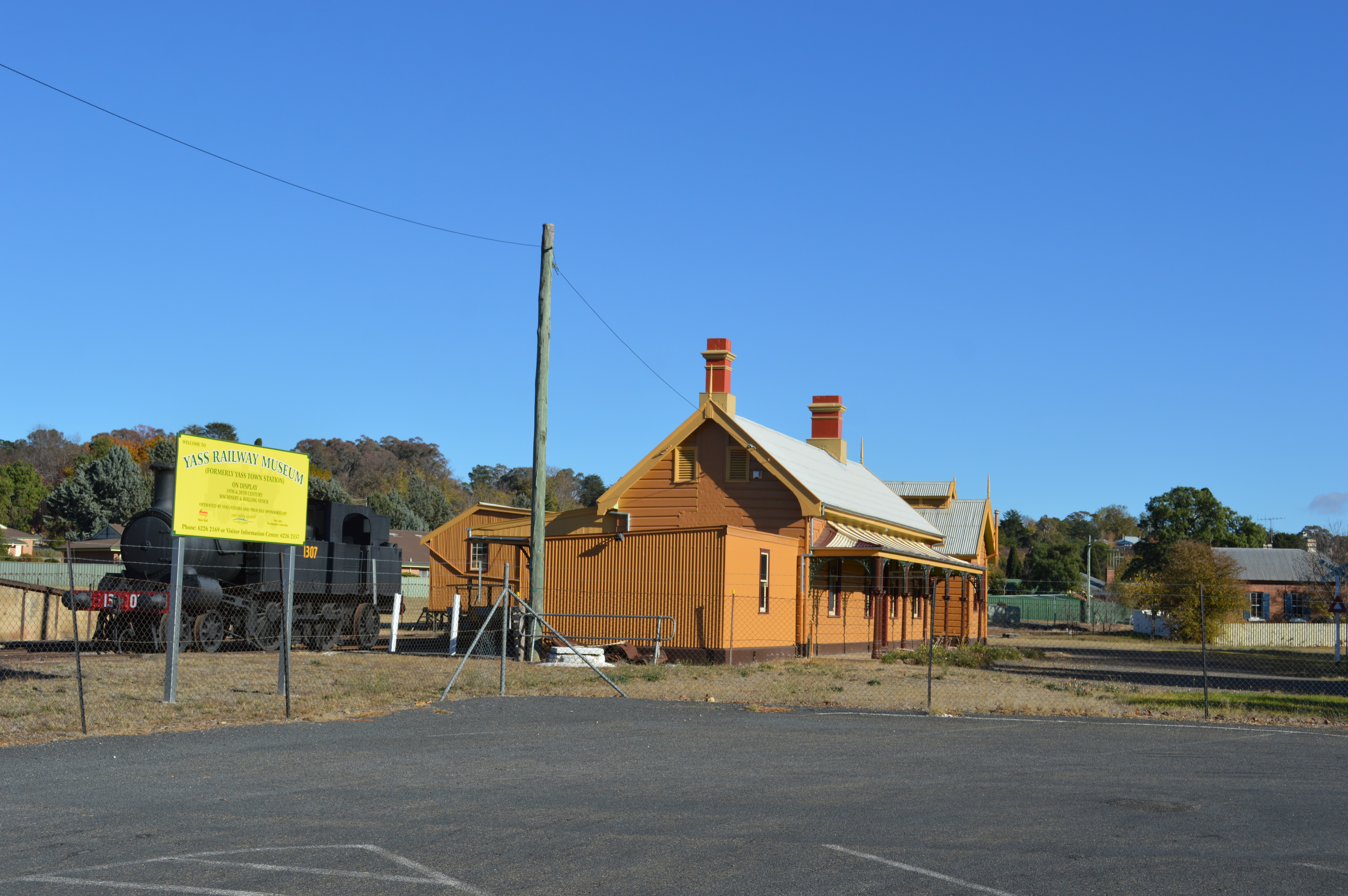
Preserved Z13 class engine at the station

Yass Town railway station is a heritage-listed former railway station and museum in the Southern Tablelands town of Yass, New South Wales, in Australia. Formerly the terminus of the Yass Tramway, it now home to the Yass Railway Museum. The property was added to the New South Wales State Heritage Register on 2 April 1999.

== History ==
The Yass Town branch tramway opened on 20 April 1892, with the pre-existing Yass station renamed Yass Junction on the same day. The line was formally closed in 1988. The Australian Railway Historical Society (ACT Division) negotiated with the State Rail Authority and the then-Yass Shire regarding the future of the tramway and yard, resulting in the council assuming control and leasing the station to the ARHS. The Yass Railway Museum opened in the former station building on the centenary of the tramway's opening, 20 April 1992.

The museum subsequently returned to control of the council, and continues to operate out of the former station.

== Description ==
The station precinct consists of a group of buildings constructed in 1891–1892. The station building is a type 4 timber roadside station. The site also contains a timber shed, a corrugated iron lamp room, and a goods shed consisting of a side shed without awning.

The platform is timber and at ground level due to having been used for a tramway. A T42 5 ton jib crane and an Avery 4cwt weighing machine are located at the station.

The track formation and track along Dutton Street also forms part of the heritage listing.

== Heritage listing ==
Yass Town group of buildings is a site of high significance and of unusual layout and design. It is the only surviving tramway (or light railway) station complex. This is shown by having all the buildings at ground level without a significant platform. The buildings date from 1892, with unusual non-standard buildings. Apart from the removal of the loco shed it is an intact group. The station building is perhaps the best surviving example of a timber roadside standard station building.

Yass Town railway station was listed on the New South Wales State Heritage Register on 2 April 1999 having satisfied the following criteria.

The place possesses uncommon, rare or endangered aspects of the cultural or natural history of New South Wales.

This item is assessed as historically rare. This item is assessed as scientifically rare. This item is assessed as arch. rare. This item is assessed as socially rare.

== See also ==
- Yass Junction railway station
