= Royal Commission into Violence, Abuse, Neglect and Exploitation of People with Disability =

Royal commission in Australia

- Inquiries: Royal Commission into Violence, Abuse, Neglect and Exploitation of People with Disability
- Commissioners: The Hon. Ronald Sackville AO, KC (Chair); The Hon. Roslyn Atkinson AO; Barbara Bennett PSM; Rhonda Galbally AC; Andrea Mason OAM; Alastair McEwin AM; The Hon. John Ryan AM
- Inquiry period: 4 April 2019 – 29 September 2023
- Constituting instrument: Royal Commissions Act 1902 (Cth)
- Website: disability.royalcommission.gov.au

The Royal Commission into Violence, Abuse, Neglect and Exploitation of People with Disability was an Australian royal commission established on 4 April 2019 by the Australian government pursuant to the Royal Commissions Act 1902. The Honourable Ronald Sackville AO, KC, who serves as Chair of the Royal Commission, The Honourable Roslyn Atkinson AO, Ms Barbara Bennett PSM, Dr Rhonda Galbally AC, Ms Andrea Mason OAM, Mr Alastair McEwin AM, and The Honourable John Ryan AM served as Royal Commissioners.

The Commissioners were required to provide an interim report by 30 October 2020, and a final report by 29 April 2022. The final report was presented to Parliament and the public 29 September 2023.

At the time of its establishment, information about the Royal Commission was issued in AUSLAN and in easy read formats.

== Terms of reference ==
On 4 April 2019, the Governor-General of the Commonwealth of Australia, General The Hon. Sir Peter Cosgrove AK, MC (Ret'd) issued Commonwealth letters patent appointing The Hon. Ronald Sackville, Ms Barbara Bennett, Dr Rhonda Galbally, Ms Andrea Mason, Mr Alastair McEwin and The Hon. John Ryan as Commissioners and detailing the commission's terms of reference.

The Commissioners were appointed to be a Commission of inquiry, and required and authorised to inquire into the following matters:

(a) what governments, institutions and the community should do to prevent, and better protect, people with disability from experiencing violence, abuse, neglect and exploitation, having regard to the extent of violence, abuse, neglect and exploitation experienced by people with disability in all settings and contexts;
(b) what governments, institutions and the community should do to achieve best practice to encourage reporting of, and effective investigations of andresponses to, violence against, and abuse, neglect and exploitation of, people with disability, including addressing failures in, and impediments to, reporting, investigating and responding to such conduct;
(c) what should be done to promote a more inclusive society that supports the independence of people with disability and their right to live free from violence, abuse, neglect and exploitation;
(d) any matter reasonably incidental to a matter referred to in paragraphs (a) to (c) or that you believe is reasonably relevant to your inquiry.

The Commissioners were directed to make any recommendations arising out of their inquiry that they consider appropriate, including recommendations about any policy, legislative, administrative or structural reforms.

The Commissioners, without limiting the scope of their inquiry or the scope of any recommendations arising out of their inquiry that they may consider appropriate, were also directed to, for the purposes of their inquiry and recommendations, to have regard to the following matters:

(e) all forms of violence against, and abuse, neglect and exploitation of, people with disability, whatever the setting or context;
(f) all aspects of quality and safety of services, including informal supports, provided by governments, institutions and the community to people with disability, including the National Disability Insurance Scheme (NDIS) and the NDIS Quality and Safeguarding Framework agreed by all Australian Governments in 2017;
(g) the specific experiences of violence against, and abuse, neglect and exploitation of, people with disability are multilayered and influenced by experiences associated with their age, sex, gender, gender identity, sexual orientation, intersex status, ethnic origin or race, including the particular situation of Aboriginal and Torres Strait Islander people and culturally and linguistically diverse people with disability;
(h) the critical role families, carers, advocates, the workforce and others play in providing care and support to people with disability;
(i) examples of best practice and innovative models of preventing, reporting, investigating or responding to violence against, and abuse, neglect or exploitation of, people with disability;
(j) the findings and recommendations of previous relevant reports and inquiries.

Where appropriate, the Commissioners were directed to not inquire into matters that lie within the scope of the Royal Commission into Aged Care Quality and Safety.

== Commissioners and executive ==
On 4 April 2019 the government appointed The Hon. Ronald Sackville, Ms Barbara Bennett, Dr Rhonda Galbally, Ms Andrea Mason, Mr Alastair McEwin and The Hon. John Ryan as commissioners to the royal commission. On 13 September 2019 the government appointed The Hon. Roslyn Atkinson as a seventh Commissioner.

== Powers ==
The powers of Royal Commissions in Australia are set out in the enabling legislation, the Royal Commissions Act 1902 (Cth).

The Royal Commissions Amendment Act 2013 (Cth) was approved by Parliament to give the Child Abuse Royal Commission additional powers to fulfil its Terms of Reference. Notable changes were:

1. Enabling the chair to authorise one or more members to hold a public or private hearing
2. Authorise members of the Royal Commission to hold private sessions

Royal Commissions, appointed pursuant to the Royal Commissions Act or otherwise, have powers to issue a summons to a person to appear before the Commission at a hearing to give evidence or to produce documents specified in the summons; require witnesses to take an oath or give an affirmation; and require a person to deliver documents to the Commission at a specified place and time. A person served with a summons or a notice to produce documents must comply with that requirement, or face prosecution for an offence. The penalty for conviction upon such an offence is a fine of A$1,000 or six months imprisonment. A Royal Commission may authorise the Australian Federal Police to execute search warrants.

== Reports ==
The federal government requested that the Commissioners provide an interim report by 30 October 2020, and a final report by 29 April 2022. Seven Progress Reports were published during the life of the Royal Commission at intervals of approximately six months. The Final Report was tabled by government in the Australian Parliament on 29 September 2023. The Royal Commission also published numerous reports covering public hearings, research and policy themes.

== See also ==
- Disability in Australia
- List of Australian royal commissions
