= Kendall railway station =

Australian railway station

Kendall
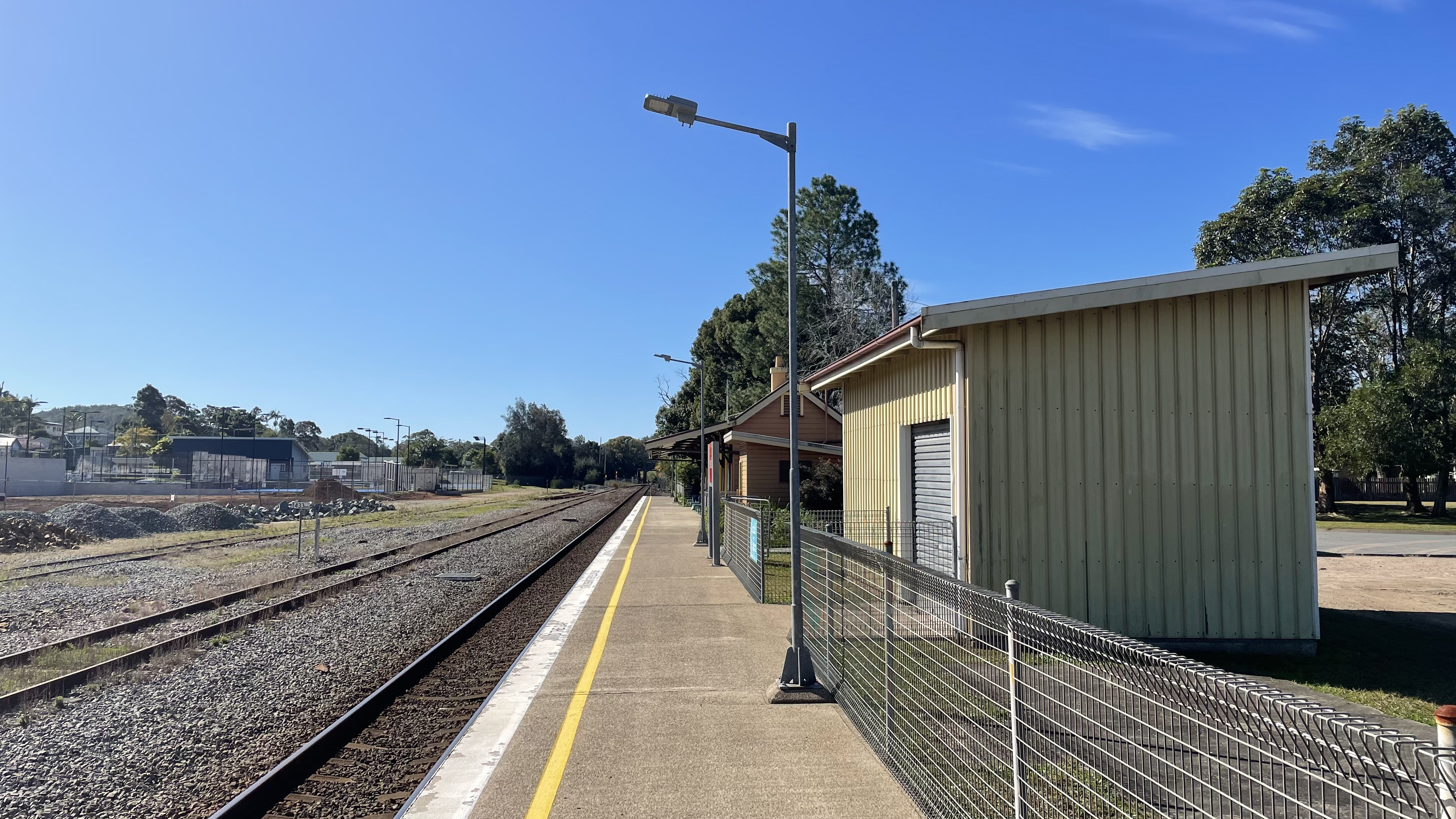
- Northbound view from station platform, August 2022

General information
- Location: Railway Street, Kendall
- Coordinates: 31°38′07″S 152°42′23″E
- Owner: Transport Asset Manager of New South Wales
- Operator: NSW TrainLink
- Line: North Coast
- Distance: 433.00 km (269.05 mi) from Central
- Platforms: 1

Construction
- Structure type: Ground
- Accessible: Yes

Other information
- Station code: KDL

History
- Opened: 12 April 1915; 111 years ago

Services
| Preceding station | NSW TrainLink | Following station |
|---|---|---|
| Wauchope towards Grafton, Casino or Brisbane | NSW TrainLink North Coast Line | Taree towards Sydney |
Location

Kendall railway station is located on the North Coast line in New South Wales, Australia. It serves the town of Kendall, opening on 12 April 1915 when the line was extended from Taree to Wauchope. In 1917, a locomotive depot was established.

== Platforms and services ==
Kendall has one platform. Each day northbound XPT services operate to Casino and Brisbane, with two southbound services operating to Sydney. This station is a request stop for the Casino and Brisbane XPTs, so these services stop here only if passengers have booked to board/alight here.

| Platform | Line | Stopping pattern | Notes |
| 1 | North Coast Region | services to Central, Casino & Brisbane | Casino & Brisbane XPTs request stop (booked passengers only) |
