= Murder of Daniel Morcombe =

Australian murder case

- Daniel Morcombe
- Location: 26°40′1.5″S 152°58′38.5″E; Abducted from Nambour Connection Road, Woombye, Queensland; Remains discovered near 510 Kings Road; Glass House Mountains, Queensland
- Date: 7 December 2003
- Attack type: Child murder by strangulation, child abduction, child rape
- Victims: Daniel James Morcombe, aged 13
- Perpetrator: Brett Peter Cowan
- Motive: Unclear
- Verdict: Guilty on all counts
- Convictions: Murder; Indecent treatment of a child under 16; Interfering with a corpse
- Sentence: Life imprisonment with the possibility of parole after 20 years
- Publication bans: Lifted after parents' request

Daniel James Morcombe (19 December 1989 – 7 December 2003) was an Australian boy who was abducted from the Sunshine Coast, Queensland, on 7 December 2003 when he was 13 years old. Eight years later, Brett Peter Cowan (born 18 September 1969), a former Sunshine Coast resident, was charged with Morcombe's murder. In the same month, DNA tests confirmed bones in the Glass House Mountains were Morcombe's. On 13 March 2014, Cowan was found guilty of the murder, and was sentenced to life imprisonment for the murder, indecently dealing with a child, and interference with a corpse.

== Disappearance ==
Morcombe was abducted from an unofficial bus stop under the Kiel Mountain Road overpass in the Woombye district of the Sunshine Coast approximately 2 kilometres (1.2 mi) north of the Big Pineapple on Sunday, 7 December 2003. Witnesses reported seeing Morcombe at approximately 2:10 PM under the overpass. Morcombe planned to catch the 1:35 PM bus to the Sunshine Plaza Shopping Centre for a haircut and to buy Christmas presents, but the bus had broken down. When a replacement bus eventually arrived, it did not stop, because it was behind schedule and the stop was unofficial. The driver radioed the depot for another bus to go and pick up Morcombe. The driver and other witnesses later reported seeing two men near Morcombe. When the second bus arrived three minutes later, Morcombe and the men were gone.

== Investigation ==
Morcombe's disappearance was one of the most extensively investigated crimes in Queensland's history. By 12 December 2008, rewards of A$250,000 from the Government and A$750,000 donated privately had been offered.

The private reward expired at midnight on 31 May 2009. That day, the Seven Network reported that a known paedophile, Douglas Jackway, could be of interest to the police. Jackway had been released from prison one month before Morcombe's disappearance. The Queensland Government came under criticism over Jackway's release; independent Queensland MP Peter Wellington claimed the Supreme Court had presented clear evidence of Jackway's risk of reoffending. This publicity prompted civil liberties groups to call for laws banning media outlets from naming people linked to criminal cases.

Earlier in the month, a full-size clay model of the man believed to be involved in Morcombe's abduction was placed at the spot where he disappeared. Within a few days more than 300 tips were received.

In July 2009, Morcombe's parents called for a coronial inquest into his disappearance. Of particular interest to the family were several criminals who had told police they knew who killed Morcombe. A coronial inquest was held between October 2010 and April 2011. The inquest called as witnesses the bus driver who had failed to stop for Morcombe at the overpass, a woman who had seen a man loitering near Morcombe, and several persons of interest.

On 13 August 2011, after an extensive Mr. Big police operation, police took Brett Peter Cowan into custody and charged him with Morcombe's murder, child stealing, deprivation of liberty, indecent treatment of a child under 16, interfering with a corpse, and other offences after having led undercover detectives to Morcombe's remains. In 2006, Cowan had been interviewed over the Morcombe case and had admitted to police that he travelled along Kiel Mountain Road on his way to purchase marijuana from a drug dealer on the day of the disappearance. Cowan confessed to having seen and approached Morcombe to offer him a lift to the shopping centre, having parked his car in a nearby car-park of the church he attended.

Around this time, a white Mitsubishi Pajero was seized from a property on Russell Island. The vehicle was believed to have been involved in Morcombe's abduction after a witness at the coronial inquest reported seeing a vehicle of similar description parked 100 metres (330 ft) north of the site where Morcombe was last seen.

=== Remains found ===
On 21 August 2011, two shoes and three human bones were found at a search site at Glass House Mountains. The shoes were similar to the ones that Morcombe was wearing when he disappeared. Underpants and a belt were also found. However, Morcombe also owned a distinctive fob style pocket watch with "Dan" engraved on it, which has not been found. By the end of the investigation, seventeen bones had been found, including a rib, hip, leg, arm, and vertebrae. They were all confirmed as belonging to Morcombe using DNA from his toothbrush to make the match. As a result of the find, Morcombe's funeral was held at Siena Catholic College on 7 December 2012. More than 2,000 people attended it.

== Trial ==
On 7 February 2014, Cowan was ordered to stand trial. He was charged with murder, indecently dealing with a child under the age of 16, and improperly dealing with a corpse. The trial, at the Supreme Court of Queensland, began on 10 February 2014 under Justice Roslyn Atkinson. The prosecution closed its case on 7 March. 116 witnesses gave evidence, and over 200 exhibits were tendered in evidence. Cowan pleaded not guilty and declined to give evidence.

On 13 March 2014, Cowan was found guilty of all charges. Cowan had two previous convictions for child sex offences. On 14 March 2014, he was sentenced to life in prison with the possibility of parole after 20 years. He was also sentenced to three-and-a-half years' imprisonment for indecently dealing with Morcombe, and two years for interfering with his corpse, those sentences to be served concurrently. Judge Roslyn Atkinson said "I don't think you should be released in 20 years' time". Cowan appealed his sentence to the Queensland Court of Appeal, under Justice Margaret McMurdo, seeking to have his conviction overturned. His legal team argued "... that the confession elicited through an undercover sting by police was inadmissible as evidence at trial". On 21 May 2015, Cowan's appeal was dismissed. The former Queensland Attorney-General Jarrod Bleijie had appealed to have Cowan's 20-year minimum sentence increased. This was also dismissed.

== Impact ==
=== The Daniel Morcombe Foundation ===
The Morcombe family started the "Daniel Morcombe Foundation", and put its resources into keeping Morcombe's disappearance in the public eye and trying to find out what happened to their son. The foundation is committed to educating children about personal safety, and to raising awareness throughout Australia of the dangers of predatory criminals. These efforts are supported by the Australian media, especially on each anniversary of Morcombe's disappearance when a "Day for Daniel" is held to promote awareness of the vulnerability of children. An accompanying event is the "Ride for Daniel", which covers 50 km of the Sunshine Coast, held each year since 2005.

In 2015, Bruce Morcombe spoke to the family of another missing child, William Tyrrell, and warned them that psychics would descend on them with "bizarre and offbeat ... distracting information". He called it distressing and said that although they received hundreds of leads telling them that there was a "shed or a water tank", none were of any help, but still couldn't be ignored in case they included a "disguised confession". Capturing data from CCTV and ATM cameras was more helpful, as once the police have a person of interest it may help disprove an alibi. Morcombe's advice was to "remain positive, that's all you can do, the police will be working hard, they want to solve it as well".

=== Media ===
Morcombe's murder was the focus of the Crime Investigation Australia season 1 episode "Tears for Daniel" aired in 2005. A film based on Morcombe's murder, titled Where is Daniel?, was planned. Directed by Peter Cousens and cinematography by Dean Cundey. On 2 July 2017, the case was covered by Casefile True Crime Podcast.

Morcombe's father, Bruce Morcombe, appears in a series six episode of the ABC's You Can't Ask That focused on "Families of Missing Persons". In this episode, Morcombe describes the family's perspective on the events, as well as the aftermath.

The Stranger, a film that fictionalises the undercover police operation to catch the murderer, was released in October 2022. In July 2022, Morcombe's parents "demanded" that the filmmakers stop using his name to market the film and were upset that they continued to do so.

=== Daniel's Law ===
On 31 December 2025, Queensland legislation established the state's first public child sex offender register, Daniel's Law, named in honour of Morcombe. The register was first introduced to Queensland Parliament in August 2025.

== See also ==
- List of kidnappings
- List of solved missing person cases (2000s)
