= Brett Peter Cowan =

Australian child murderer and serial child rapist (born 1969)

- Born: 18 September 1969 (age 57); Bunbury, Western Australia
- Status: Incarcerated
- Convictions: 2014: Murder; Indecent treatment of children under 16; Interfering with a corpse; 1994: Gross indecency; Grievous bodily harm; Deprivation of liberty; 1989: Indecent treatment of children under 16
- Penalty: Life imprisonment with the possibility of parole after 20 years (August 2031)

Details
- Killed: Daniel James Morcombe
- Injured: 3

Brett Peter Cowan (born 18 September 1969) is an Australian child murderer and serial child rapist. He was convicted of the murder of Daniel Morcombe, a 13-year-old boy who disappeared from the Sunshine Coast on 7 December 2003. His abduction led to an eight-year investigation involving various suspects. As a result of these investigations, Cowan led undercover police to a potential burial site. He was charged with the murder that same month, and Morcombe's remains were discovered days later on 17 August. Cowan was sentenced to life imprisonment, (being eligible for parole in 2031) on 13 March 2014 in a trial that attracted worldwide attention. Cowan had two previous convictions for sexually abusing children, the earliest dating back to 1987.

The investigation into Morcombe's disappearance became the highest profile crime case in Queensland's history.

== Early life and background ==
"We were standing there in the kitchen and his mum was chopping up the ham. I specifically remember him [Cowan] grabbing a piece of ham and his brother slapped his hand away. There was a big argument and the boys went out and had a bit of a scuffle."

— Cowan's ex-girlfriend on the family dynamics of the Cowan brothers

Cowan was born on 18 September 1969 in Bunbury, Western Australia, to Marlene, a homemaker and RSL worker, and Peter Cowan, an Australian Army Major and Vietnam veteran. He was the third of four boys. The Cowans headed a strict household and gave their children a Catholic upbringing, and were, by many accounts, a "good family". Cowan's father was often absent due to his Army responsibilities, and suffered from PTSD. In the early 1970s, the family relocated to Brisbane, eventually settling in the suburb of Everton Park.

Cowan and his three brothers attended Marcellin College, now known as Mt Maria College, an independent Catholic high school in Mitchelton in northside Brisbane. Cowan's year nine English teacher claimed that Cowan was something of a bully who taunted other students, who would proudly parade around with erections and was "despised by his peers". Conversely, other students at his school remembered him as being an "ordinary guy" with few hobbies or social interests who "seemed alright".

Cowan dropped out of school in year ten and began working odd jobs throughout his late teens, never holding down employment in one position for longer than a few months. Cowan also struggled to come to terms with his bisexuality. He proved difficult for his mother, who said he was a "handful" as a child, becoming a difficult teenager, occasionally stealing from her. His problems escalated as he became involved in petty crime; his first criminal conviction came at the age of 17. By that time, he regularly used LSD, cocaine, and methamphetamines. He later stated of his drug use: "They do fuck your inhibitions up … you know, your boundaries." He was in the Boys Brigade.

== Criminal history ==
=== Prior convictions ===
Cowan's theft and drug offences with the law had resulted in him performing community service duties at a public park in Brisbane. On 5 December 1987, during one of these community service sessions, when Cowan was 18 years old, he took a 7-year-old child from the park into a toilet cubicle and raped him. Cowan's demeanour subsequent to the attack was casual, as he proceeded to watch television inside the childcare centre where he was performing maintenance duties. Cowan was sentenced to two years' jail in 1989, but only served half of that sentence.

In September 1993, while living at a Darwin caravan park with his 18-year-old girlfriend Tracey Haneveld, Cowan lured a 6-year-old boy into an abandoned car yard and raped him. The boy was left in an abandoned car in the bush with a punctured lung due to the force of the act and several cuts. The boy stumbled into a petrol station, dazed and distraught, and the police were called immediately. They initially assumed the boy had been hit by a car because of the extent of his injuries. Cowan initially denied his involvement, going to considerable length to portray his innocence by stating to the police, "I hope you catch the bastard". However, the officers quickly discovered that Cowan was the only man in the caravan park not to offer up a DNA sample after semen was found on the boy's discarded underwear. A background check conducted by the officers also revealed his former molestation conviction in 1987. Police contacted him once again with the evidence, and he quickly confessed to the rape.

Cowan was sentenced in 1994 in the Northern Territory Supreme Court to serve seven years in jail for various charges: grievous harm, deprivation of liberty, and gross indecency; however, more severe charges, such as attempted murder, were dropped prior to the trial. He was then only required to serve 3.5 years. Psychological assessments followed, and Cowan was deemed as a pathological liar who lived a "parasitic existence", relying mostly on his parents to support him. The psychologist also discovered a gross lack of awareness on behalf of Cowan, who believed that his victim "would not report the case" because he "probably enjoyed" the experience.

Haneveld confronted Cowan in prison and asked if he was involved. He did not respond, and as his guilt became clear to her, she left the prison distraught. This was her last contact with Cowan. In March 2014, prior to his sentencing in the Morcombe case, Haneveld spoke to 60 Minutes about her relationship with him, which she claimed was full of infidelity on his part. During the trial, Cowan stated to the sentencing judge that his "years of heavy poly drug use" was an explanation for his assault history.

"Cowan's behaviour began to deteriorate at home [with his uncle and aunt], particularly after he had his own vehicle. While still on parole, he was staying out late and going out at unusual times of night, using the excuse of catching up with mates or going fishing.

"'After addressing him over some personal issues that were of great concern to us, including lying, our relationship began to become strained and eventually he moved out to his own flat and the rest is history.'"

–Cowan's uncle, who provided him rehabilitation and a home for a period of time in 1998

Following his release from jail in 1997, Cowan professed his desire for rehabilitation and said that he recognised that his sexual deviancy was a problem. He was ordered to attend a sexual offenders treatment program, and moved in with his pastor aunt and uncle, Jenny and Keith Philbrook, on the Sunshine Coast, becoming a reformed Christian. In 1998, 29-year-old Cowan moved into the suburb of Beerwah with Tracey Lee Moncrieff, another churchgoer. The two were married the following year and had two children. Cowan regularly attended church services, and no criminal convictions were reported from this time up until 2003. During that year, Cowan also stopped attending church and the couple divorced in 2004.

Cowan had signed up to a number of gay dating websites, including Gaydar and Manhunt. He was using one of these profiles from Perth just before his arrest under fake names. The Sunday Mail discovered the profile, under a variation of the name "Shaddo N’unyah Hunter". Cowan sought out a long list of extreme sex acts and said he was open to meeting anyone up to the age of around mid-50s.

=== Disappearance of Daniel Morcombe ===
On 7 December 2003, 13-year-old schoolboy Daniel Morcombe left his home and planned to catch the 1:35 pm bus to the Sunshine Plaza Shopping Centre for a haircut and to buy Christmas presents for his family, but he failed to return. A bus had broken down on the side of the road and a replacement bus was later sent to pick up the passengers. The replacement bus drove past Daniel, and shortly after, in just a three-minute time span, Cowan is believed to have abducted him. Cowan was living in the town of Beerwah around the time of Morcombe's disappearance. He was approached by police because of his criminal history and his proximity to the area in which Morcombe was last seen. Just days after the disappearance, however, he denied his involvement. A former police officer believed Cowan to be suspect from just one encounter; he stated that "Look, if he's not good for that, he's good for something. I left with the distinct impression of guilt." A police interview with Cowan was conducted in July 2005 in the Gold Coast. Detective Tracey Barnes, who handled the interview, asked Cowan if he would admit being involved and he responded with "probably not".

Over the following years, the case shifted its attention from Cowan to convicted sex offender Douglas Jackway. Witnesses reported seeing a blue vehicle near the location of Morcombe's disappearance and Jackway had a vehicle that very closely matched witness descriptions. However, Cowan was brought before the Daniel Morcombe coroner's inquest six years later, where he was referred to as P7. Cowan stated he had driven along the road where Morcombe was last seen, but he was only travelling along there to pick up a mulcher. He also provided this as an alibi for the missing time, and said he had visited his cannabis dealer during the time Daniel was supposedly taken. Further police investigation revealed that Cowan's dealers were not home during the time Morcombe disappeared, meaning that Cowan could not have been with them. However, despite an unreliable alibi, police had no real forensic evidence to charge Cowan with the abduction and murder of the teenager. During this time, Cowan changed his name to Shaddo N-unyah Hunter, possibly to evade police. He later remarked that 'Shaddo' was his dog's name and 'N-unyah' a euphemism which translates to the idiom "none of your business". Moncrieff, Cowan's wife at the time, later admitted in court that she lied about her husband's whereabouts on the day of Morcombe's disappearance because she was "blinded by love". After their divorce, she revealed in court that he was gone for up to five hours that day.

=== Police sting ===
A covert police operation that had been used in Canada drew the attention of an investigator involved in Morcombe's case. The procedure, known as Mr. Big, consists of police officers who pose as members of a corrupt criminal gang to gain the confidence of the suspect, enlisting the suspect's participation in an escalating series of often elaborate fictional crimes, particularly theft, prostitution and the drug trade. Once the suspect's trust has been gained, the police persuade the suspect to confess to the earlier, real crime. In this case, an undercover police officer, posing as a crime boss known as "Paul Fitzsimmons" or "Fitzy", befriended Cowan on a flight to Perth in April 2011. Fitzsimmons gained the trust of Cowan and the two became friends. Due to the absence of any physical evidence, a confession by Cowan was needed. Over the following months, Cowan's gang of friends initiated him through an array of fake criminal scenarios. Cowan was issued a subpoena for his alibi in Morcombe's case; however, he denied any involvement. In August 2011, at an interview at the Perth Hyatt Hotel, an undercover officer gained Cowan's trust, saying he "only wanted to help Cowan", and that Cowan could trust him with anything. Cowan subsequently disclosed his involvement in Morcombe's abduction and the confession was captured on video.

Over the next few days, Cowan led the undercover police officers to the site of Morcombe's remains. At the site, several undercover police officers arrested Cowan. On 13 August 2011, Cowan was taken into custody and charged with Morcombe's murder and other offences, including child stealing, deprivation of liberty, indecent treatment of a child under 16, and interfering with a corpse. In 2006, Cowan had admitted to police that he travelled on the road from which Morcombe disappeared on the same day, on his way to purchase marijuana from a drug dealer. Around this time, a white Mitsubishi Pajero was seized from a property on Russell Island. The vehicle was believed to have been involved in Morcombe's abduction after a witness at the coroner's inquest in April 2011, reported seeing a vehicle of similar description parked 100 metres (330 ft) north of the site where Morcombe was last seen.

== Trial, sentencing and incarceration ==
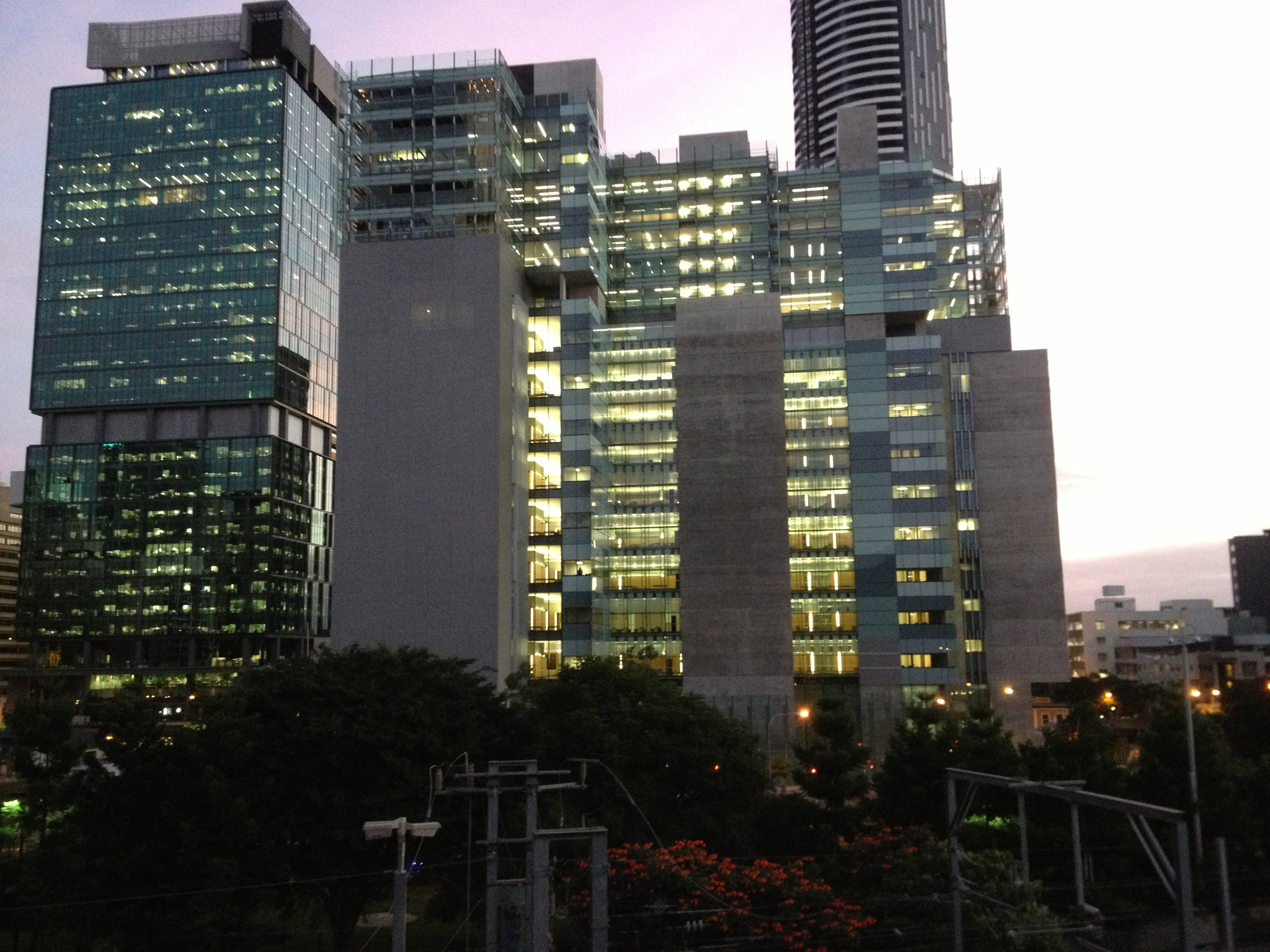
Cowan's trial was heard at Brisbane's Supreme and District Court of Queensland in 2014.

On 7 February 2014, Cowan was ordered to stand trial. He was charged with murder, indecently dealing with a child under the age of 16 and improperly dealing with a corpse. The trial, at the Supreme Court of Queensland in the state's capital Brisbane, began on 10 February 2014 under Justice Roslyn Atkinson. Cowan stated he only confessed because of the lucrative money deal that was offered to him. The undercover policeman posing as 'Arnold' agreed that the fake crime gang had "dangled a carrot in the form of big money in front of Cowan".

The prosecution closed its case on 7 March. 116 witnesses gave evidence and over 200 exhibits were tendered in evidence. Cowan pleaded not guilty and declined to give evidence. Bruce and Denise Morcombe, as well as Daniel's brothers, gave lengthy victim impact statements. Cowan stated he had no remorse. On 13 March 2014, Cowan was found guilty of all charges. On 14 March 2014, Cowan was sentenced to life in prison with the possibility of parole after 20 years. He was also sentenced to three-and-a-half years' imprisonment for indecently dealing with Morcombe and two years for interfering with his corpse, those sentences to be served concurrently. Judge Roslyn Atkinson said "I don't think you should be released in 20 years time" which could affect Cowan's prison term.

In August 2016, while incarcerated at Wolston Correctional Centre, Cowan was assaulted by another inmate, Adam Paul Davidson. Davidson was found guilty of pouring boiling water from a mop bucket over Cowan and then striking him. Davidson was sentenced to 3 years in prison for the attack.

== Pathology ==
Cowan has undergone multiple psychiatric examinations since his first offences in the late 1980s and early 1990s. The psychologist who had assessed him after his second molestation conviction in 1993 claimed he was a pathological liar with low level psychopathic features or mild psychopathy indicating a severe lack of empathy. Despite this, a concrete psychiatric diagnosis on him has been elusive and inconclusive. Acquaintances of Cowan, particularly his ex-girlfriends, had described him as initially being "charming", seeming "confident" and as being "handsome", which made it easy for him to gain the trust of his victims. The judge of the trial remarked to Cowan that he "did not look like a monster or a pedophile, he looked like an ordinary person". Furthermore, she remarked that he was a "convincing and adaptable liar". In a psychologist's report compiled in 2007, Cowan stated: "I always worry, if things got bad, I could offend again. I could never do this against my own flesh and blood." He has also expressed his belief that years of habitual drug use motivated or contributed to his attacks. Cowan's reputation as a charismatic, "every day" individual was of particular focus in the media during the investigations and arrest.

== See also ==
- List of Australian criminals
