= Murder of Michelle Bright =

Unsolved 1999 crime in Australia

Michelle Bright
- Born: Michelle Loraine Bright; 2 July 1981; New South Wales, Australia
- Died: 2 February 1999 (aged 17); Gulgong, New South Wales
- Cause of death: Undetermined. Homicide
- Body discovered: 5 February 1999
- Resting place: Gulgong General Cemetery, New South Wales, Australia; 32.37554°S 149.53111°E (approximate)
- Occupation: Student

Michelle Bright was a 17-year-old girl who was found raped and murdered in New South Wales, Australia.

== Last known sighting ==
Michelle Bright was last seen at 12:45 am on 2 February 1999 by a friend who dropped her off in Mayne Street, Gulgong following a friend's 15th birthday party that day. The Minister for Police, Michael Daley, announced that the NSW Government was offering a reward of $500,000 to solve the murder of Bright, which at the time was the highest reward offered in NSW (the current highest being the reward offered for the recovery of William Tyrrell). The police regarded Bright's death as a horrific crime.

== Arrest of suspect ==
On 10 August 2020, the reward was raised to $1,000,000. The following day, 53-year-old Craig Henry Rumsby, a former neighbour of Bright's, was arrested for her murder, as well as an additional charge of assault with intent to rape; committed in 1998 against an 18-year old.

== Trial by jury ==
On 30 June 2023, Rumsby was found guilty of Bright's murder and the assault on the 18-year-old.

On 7 August 2023, Justice Robert Allan Hulme sentenced Rumsby to 32 years imprisonment with a non-parole period of 24 years: Rumsby will be eligible for parole in 2044, at the age of 77.
