= Kendall School of Arts =

- Location within New South Wales Location within Australia
- 31.6323°S 152.7031°E
- Location: Comboyne Street, Kendall, Port Macquarie-Hastings Council, New South Wales, Australia

History
- Built: 1908–

Site notes
- Owner: Kendall Community Centre

New South Wales Heritage Register
- Official name: Kendall School of Arts; now the Kendall Community Centre; known locally as Kendall Hall
- Type: state heritage (built)
- Designated: 2 April 1999
- Reference no.: 479
- Type: School of Arts
- Category: Community Facilities

Kendall School of Arts is a heritage-listed school of arts at Comboyne Street, Kendall, Port Macquarie-Hastings Council, New South Wales, Australia. It was built from 1908. It is also known as the Kendall Community Centre and known locally as Kendall Hall. The property is owned by Kendall Community Centre. It was added to the New South Wales State Heritage Register on 2 April 1999.

== History ==
The site was proposed to be set apart as a site for a School of Arts in 1892. The land was excised from Camping Reserve No. 132, which had been notified on 1 August 1881. The Camping Reserve was used to rest horses and bullock teams after logs were brought from the forests to the Kendall timber mills.

In 1908 the existing timber building was erected. It was officially opened in 1910. The name Kendall School of Arts remained in official use until 1984.

The traditional role of Schools of Arts, also known as mechanics' institutes, was to provide venues for lectures, classes and libraries for the useful knowledge and mental and moral improvement of the working class. In the early 20th century Schools of Arts had become important social and political meeting places as well as places of entertainment: social evenings, debutante balls and later the showing of moving pictures.

Kendall School of Arts is one of at least seven surviving Schools of Arts within an 80 kilometre radius that were built between Federation and World War I.

Following the loss of the supper room roof during a storm in 1983, the residents of Kendall met to determine the future of the building. Five options were given ranging from sale, total demolition for a part, demolition and replacement with a new building and essential repairs only to complete restoration. The vote was in favour of restoration.

In 1984 the name School of Arts was changed to Community Centre. However, it is generally called Kendall Hall. Both the Commonwealth Office and the Heritage Office provided funding for the restoration. The building continues to fulfill all the traditional functions of a School of Arts. The Camden Haven Learning Exchange was established there in 1982, to move in 1991 to Laurieton as Camden Haven Adult and Community Education. Kendall Community Pre-School was established in 1988 and operated in the Hall for several years.

Currently the side rooms are occupied by the Community Technology Centre which was established in 2003. Kendall School of Arts is in full time use. Many different community activities and meetings are held there and its superb acoustics are widely admired. It is the home of several major events and festivals and remains the social and cultural hub of the district.

== Description ==
The symmetrical Kendall School of Arts is built of timber and has a corrugated galvanised iron roof. It occupies a commanding site at the top of the village shopping centre. It is well sited on a sloping triangular piece of land which addresses the Y intersection of Comboyne and Albert Streets. The apex of the triangle is truncated by an unofficial road on the eastern side.

The adjacent 1919 Kendall War memorial and surrounding open space complements the hall site, even though it intersects the view from the shopping centre. the hall is dug into the ground on the northern (Comboyne Road) side and is high off the ground on the southern (Albert Street) side. A supper room is attached on the southern elevation. The rear of the building has lesser additions of stage and dressing rooms.

In 1973 the former one-roomed Batar Creek State School was moved to the rear of the site, for the use of youth of the district. It occupies the site of a former nineteenth century cottage.

The vista from the front of the Hall encompasses the mix of residential, commercial and industrial buildings that is the centre of the village of Kendall. Similarly, the hall dominates the view from the shopping centre. The dwellings on Comboyne and Albert Streets opposite the Hall are predominately turn of the century timber cottages, some with Victorian detailing.

A mature, double trunked Camphor laurel dominates the Comboyne Street boundary and is flanked by two small silky oak trees, which were planted in 1988 to commemorate the celebrated bicentenary of Australia.

Only one other listed building, an outstanding Federation house, is adjacent to the School of Arts. It is situated approximately a hundred metres away just over the nearby Comboyne Street hill but neither building is visible from the other.

== Heritage listing ==
The Kendall School of Arts is significant as, along with the Kendall Railway Station, it is an important indicator of Kendall's major period of commercial and social activity, which began in 1900. It has been in continuous use as a community venue for almost 100 years, a continuing tradition. It is well built of local timber and therefore indicative of the timber industry, which was the major local industry for approximately 100 years. It has outstanding and widely recognised acoustic properties.

Kendall School of Arts was listed on the New South Wales State Heritage Register on 2 April 1999 having satisfied the following criteria.

The place has strong or special association with a particular community or cultural group in New South Wales for social, cultural or spiritual reasons.

The existing Kendall Hall has been maintained as a community facility since its construction. It is a significant focal point for the community. Its function, for which it was built, has remained constant.

The place is important in demonstrating the principal characteristics of a class of cultural or natural places/environments in New South Wales.

Representative of Schools of Arts - the purpose of which was to provide facilities for the education, and the mental and moral improvement of the working class.
