= Andrea Mason (political candidate) =

Australian politician

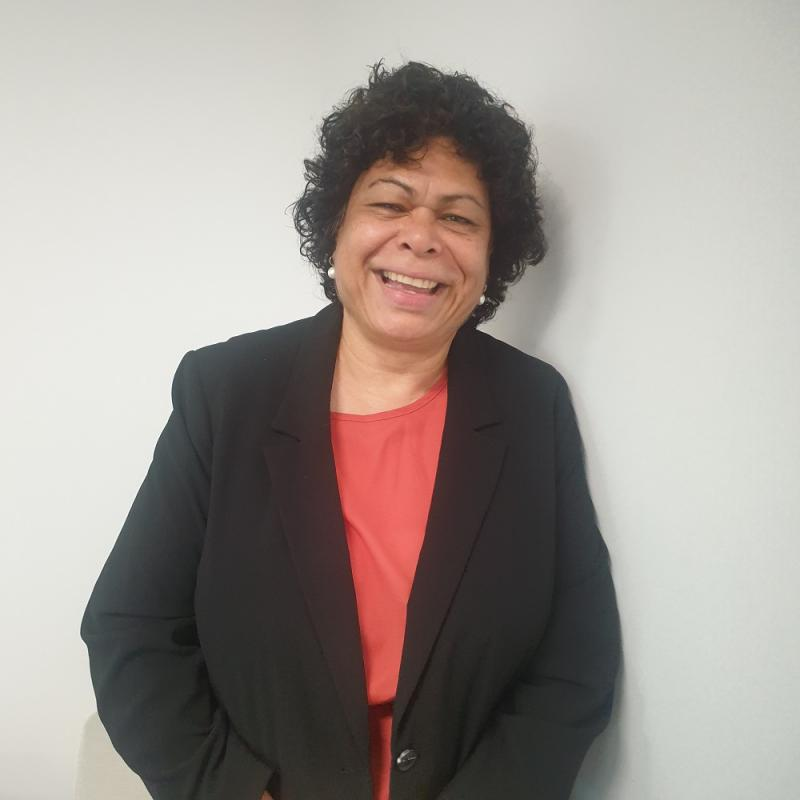

Leader of the Family First Party
- In office 2004–2005
- Preceded by: Position established
- Succeeded by: Steve Fielding

Personal details
- Born: 1968 (age 57–58)
- Party: Family First Party

Andrea Mason OAM (born 1968) is an Australian former political candidate. At the 2004 federal election, she led the Family First Party, standing unsuccessfully as its lead Senate candidate in South Australia. She gained notability as the first Aboriginal woman to lead an Australian political party to a federal election. Mason was the coordinator, now known as the chief executive officer, of the Ngaanyatjarra, Pitjantjatjara and Yankunytjatjara Women's Council (NPYWC) from March 2015 to April 2019.

== Background and career ==
Mason is the daughter of Ben Mason, an Aboriginal Christian pastor involved in the founding of the Aboriginal Evangelical Fellowship, she was born in Subiaco, Western Australia. She grew up in Western Australia before her family moved to Adelaide, South Australia in 1979. After completing her secondary education she was awarded a Netball Scholarship at the Australian Institute of Sport and moved to Canberra for two years. On her return to Adelaide, Mason studied for a Bachelor of Aboriginal Affairs and public administration at the South Australian Institute of Technology (now the University of South Australia). She graduated in 1988, and from 1989 onwards she worked on housing and employment programs with the South Australian Public Service. In 1999, Mason commenced a Bachelor of Laws Degree at the University of Adelaide. Graduating in 2002, she began working for Andrew Evans, a member of the South Australian Legislative Council and leader of the South Australian branch of the Family First Party, as a personal assistant.

On 8 August 2004, Mason became the first-ever Indigenous Australian woman to lead an Australian political party, when the Family First Party chose her as its national leader. She unsuccessfully contested the 2004 Australian federal election as the party's South Australian lead Australian Senate candidate.

In 2019, Mason was appointed to serve as a commissioner to the Royal Commission into Violence, Abuse, Neglect and Exploitation of People with Disability.

== Awards ==
- 2016 Telstra Australian Businesswoman of the Year

Preceded by Party Founded	Leader of the Family First Party; 2004–2005	Succeeded by Steve Fielding
