= Disappearance of William Tyrrell =

Unsolved 2014 missing-person case

William Tyrrell
- Tyrrell in a Spider-Man costume taken a few minutes before he disappeared
- Born: 26 June 2011; Australia
- Disappeared: 12 September 2014 (aged 3); Kendall, New South Wales, Australia
- Status: Missing for 12 years, 2 months and 8 days Presumed dead by authorities

Locations
1 Benaroon Drive, Kendall

William Tyrrell (born 26 June 2011) is an Australian boy who disappeared at the age of three from Kendall, New South Wales, on 12 September 2014. He had been playing at his foster grandmother's house with his sister, and was wearing a Spider-Man suit at the time of his disappearance. For the first seven years of the investigation, Tyrrell was believed to have been abducted. On 12 September 2016, a reward of A$1 million was offered for the recovery of Tyrrell and did not require the arrest, charging or conviction of any person or persons.

On 15 November 2021, after receiving new evidence, the New South Wales Police Force renewed the search for Tyrrell in three areas surrounding Kendall, assuming that they were searching for human remains. On 17 November, major media reported that Tyrrell's foster mother and now-deceased foster grandmother were being treated as persons of interest in his disappearance. The police began investigating the possibility of a fall from a balcony on the property.

On 27 June 2023, police recommended charges against Tyrrell's foster mother for perverting the course of justice and interfering with a corpse.

== Disappearance ==
On 11 September 2014, three-year-old William Tyrrell, his foster parents and his five-year-old sister travelled four hours from Sydney to visit his foster grandmother in Kendall. His grandmother's house on Benaroon Drive is directly across a bush road from the Kendall State Forest, about 35 kilometres (22 mi) south of Port Macquarie.

Between 10:00 and 10:25 am on 12 September, Tyrrell and his sister were playing hide-and-seek in the front and back yard, while his foster mother and foster grandmother were sitting outside watching them. Tyrell's foster mother went inside to make a cup of tea; she became worried after she had not heard him for five minutes and began searching the yard and house. Shortly after, Tyrrell's foster father returned after going to Lakewood on business and began searching the street, knocking on neighbours' doors.

At 10:57, Tyrrell's foster mother phoned 000 emergency services to report him missing. The New South Wales Police Force arrived at 11:06. His foster mother's last memory was that Tyrrell was imitating a tiger's roar while running towards the side of the home, and then there was silence and he had disappeared. She had looked for him but without success.

== Investigation ==
=== Initial search efforts ===
Hundreds of police, members of the State Emergency Service and the Rural Fire Service, and members of the community searched day and night for Tyrrell. Specialist police, including the sex crimes squad from Strike Force, became involved. Motorcycles and helicopters were brought in to search. Two hundred volunteers searched overnight, hundreds of people combed rugged terrain around the home and police divers searched waterways and dams. Police searched every house in the estate that surrounds Benaroon Drive several times. Detection dogs were brought in and managed to detect Tyrrell's scent, but only within the boundaries of the backyard.

"Strike Force Rosann" was established with specially trained investigators from the State Crime Command who were experienced in the unexplained disappearance of young children. They supported the police, other emergency services workers and members of the public involved in the search. After five days, police said they were unable to come up with any leads.

=== Sighted vehicles ===
An artist's impression of two cars seen near the Tyrrell home on the morning Tyrrell disappeared

Police later began investigations into finding the drivers of two cars that were seen parked on the dead-end road on the morning Tyrrell disappeared. The cars, described as a white station wagon and an older-style grey sedan, were parked between two driveways of the acre lot of land. They were seen with their driver's side windows down and were unknown in a neighbourhood where locals were considered friends. These cars were noticed by Tyrrell's foster mother and have not been seen again since the time he disappeared. The police regard these particular vehicles with suspicion, as there seemed to be no logical reason why they would be parked on the street before Tyrrell's disappearance.

Reportedly, at 9:00 am, a green or grey sedan car drove past the Benaroon Drive residence while Tyrrell and his sister were riding bikes in the driveway. The car drove into the no through road, did a U-turn in the neighbour's driveway and drove out of the street. Secondly, another 4WD was sighted driving out of Benaroon Drive at about 10:30 am, about the time Tyrrell disappeared. The same vehicle was later seen speeding down another Kendall street. The police said that they have known about these cars since the investigation started. However, as part of investigative strategy, the information about these vehicles was not released to the public until twelve months after Tyrrell disappeared.

=== Suspected paedophile ring ===
The police cleared Tyrrell's family of any involvement in the disappearance and initially believed the boy was abducted by an opportunistic stranger who may have a connection with a paedophile ring. The police also believed initially that the boy could be alive in the hands of a group of people suspected of paedophile activity, but it is no longer believed the kidnapper is a member of a paedophile ring. Investigators have interviewed dozens of people, including a number of paedophiles. A Current Affair reported that about twenty registered sex offenders were living in the surrounding area of Kendall where Tyrrell went missing.

Two persons of interest in the case, both convicted child sex offenders, may have met up on the day Tyrrell vanished. The family of one paedophile, who had ninety convictions against his name including aggravated indecent assault of a minor, said he was going to visit another child sex offender on that day and returned home drunk that afternoon, but told police he spent that day in the bush collecting scrap metal. It was reported that both men lived in the Kendall area and had been driving vehicles that matched the description of the grey sedan and white station wagon that had been seen near the Benaroon Drive residence around the time Tyrrell disappeared. They also had been members of an organisation called GAPA (Grandparents As Parents Again) and were friends. The pair were both questioned by the police and categorically denied being friends, or having any involvement in the disappearance.

Another man who repaired a washing machine at the Benaroon Drive residence faced unrelated historical child sex charges in Victoria and was due to appear in court on 4 July 2016. The police had charged the man with multiple child sexual offences, including various counts of indecent assault and sexual intercourse with children between 1983 and 1985 in Victoria. The man posted an online video in September 2015 denying any involvement in the Tyrrell disappearance and was not present on Benaroon Drive on the day the boy vanished. It was eventually confirmed that the man had been elsewhere on the morning of the disappearance, and all of the charges relating to historical offences were dropped or dismissed. The man sued the New South Wales Police Force for damages in relation to misfeasance in public office, abuse of process and malicious prosecution. In December 2022, the Supreme Court of New South Wales awarded him $1.48 million damages plus interest finding that lead detective Gary Jubelin's pursuit of him was 'malicious' and that fabricated historical sex crimes had been brought with the sole purpose of pressuring the suspect into confessing to the Tyrrell disappearance.

In 2021, an inquest revealed a testimony from a woman pseudonymed "Tanya", who told about how two brothers she had babysat revealed to her that they had been threatened by a local man who they had seen burying a suitcase, which the man claimed contained the body of Tyrrell.

=== Reported sightings ===
More than 1,000 suspected sightings were reported to the investigation team in the two years after Tyrrell disappeared. They include a photo taken of a man and a young boy from Queensland, the latter of whom looked strikingly similar to Tyrrell. However, twenty-four hours later, police received another call to confirm that the boy was not him. In early 2015, two passengers and a member of a New Zealand-bound flight crew thought they saw Tyrrell on their aeroplane. The police met the aircraft at the airport and soon discovered it was not him. Another photo showed a young boy and a woman in a McDonald's restaurant in central Queensland. The boy looked similar to Tyrrell, and the woman who was with the boy looked like his grandmother; police later confirmed that the mother and boy were not them.

=== Later developments ===
==== Strike Force Rosann ====
On 16 September 2014, Strike Force Rosann was established to investigate Tyrrell's disappearance. It consisted of fourteen detectives and analysts working full-time to solve the case. The team also sifted through hundreds of pieces of information pouring in from the public. The ramped-up investigation came after a personal plea from Tyrrell's parents to members of State Parliament, Deputy Premier and Minister for Justice, at a private event in late 2015. The family spokesperson said that "They just want to reinforce that police believe he could still be alive and they're just asking members of the public not to give up on him." The investigation became the state's largest, involving dozens of analysts, investigators and two strike forces: Rosann, run by the Homicide Squad, and Rosann Two, which provided assistance from the Armed Holdup, Sex Crimes and Fraud Squads.

==== One million dollar reward ====
On 12 September 2016, the second anniversary of Tyrrell's disappearance, the NSW government announced a $1 million reward for information on his whereabouts. The police say that the reward will usually be paid out as conditional on the arrest and conviction of the offender, but the recovery of Tyrrell had been added as a condition on this reward. It is the largest ever reward offered to find a missing person in NSW's history and double the amount of the state's previously highest standing reward of $500,000, attached to the 1999 case of murdered teenager Michelle Bright.

==== Case data ====
The case has led to a record number of over 2,800 calls to NSW Crime Stoppers alone since Tyrrell disappeared. The police have interviewed more than 1,000 people in connection with the case. There have been 11,000 documents created by the police. The search has gone global as far as Europe and the US. Crime Stoppers websites in up to 26 countries have been asked by the Australian Federal Police to post an appeal for information about the case. The police have identified 690 persons of interest to their inquiry and have called in other specialist squads within the State Crime Command to investigate many such persons as low-priority targets so that the rest are being questioned by "Strike Force Rosann". The Australian reported that it is possible detectives have already interviewed the person or persons involved.

==== 2018 search ====
On 12 June 2018, police announced that they were planning to undertake a "large-scale forensic search" in bushland around Kendall, which would last for three to four weeks and be run by search experts from the Public Order and Riot Squad.

==== 2021 search for remains ====
On 15 November 2021, NSW police announced that they had received new evidence and were renewing the search for Tyrrell in three regions surrounding the town of Kendall, this time with the assumption that they would be finding his remains.

== Parents, legal matters and criticism ==
Tyrrell was in foster care at the time of his disappearance which prevented his biological parents from being named for legal reasons. The legal reasons bound by the legislation prevented them being identified publicly or holding any press conferences for the purpose of appealing publicly about their missing son. On 24 August 2017, the New South Wales Supreme Court of Appeal ruled that Tyrrell's status as a foster child and the fact he disappeared while in state care with foster parents was "one of legitimate public interest". His parents were previously allowed to speak during a 60 Minutes interview on the condition that they did not show their faces.

The father of murdered teenager Daniel Morcombe had criticised the NSW government's refusal to allow Tyrrell's parents to speak publicly about their son's disappearance as it was vital in helping to generate information that was then followed up by the police. They also feared the decision may have hindered the police investigation during the crucial weeks following Tyrrell's disappearance. But the NSW government released a statement saying its "key priority is to always act in the interests of the safety and wellbeing of children and not in any way to jeopardise ongoing police investigations".

== Current status ==
Despite various search efforts and forensic testing, as of June 2023 police are not certain what happened to Tyrrell. In June 2015, Detective Inspector Gary Jubelin commented that the investigation into the disappearance of Tyrrell remained a priority for the NSW Police Force and said that the investigators would treat the case as though he was alive, until they had evidence proving otherwise. On 20 February 2016, a police spokesperson said that the ongoing investigation was one of the biggest investigations being run by homicide and that they have not given up hope of finding Tyrrell alive. On 15 November 2021, Detective Chief Superintendent Darren Bennett stated that "It's highly likely that if we found something it would be a body. We are looking for the remains of William Tyrrell, no doubt about that".

In April 2022, Tyrrell's foster mother was charged with giving false or misleading information about the boy's disappearance to a NSW Crime Commission hearing. She was found not guilty in November 2022.

On 27 June 2023, police recommended charges against Tyrrell's foster mother for perverting the course of justice and interfering with a corpse. They allege that she concealed his accidental death and then disposed of his body.

== See also ==
- Murder of Tiahleigh Palmer
- Disappearance of Cleo Smith
- Murder of Daniel Morcombe
- List of people who disappeared mysteriously: post-1970
