= John Ryan (New South Wales politician) =

Australian politician

The Honourable John Ryan AM
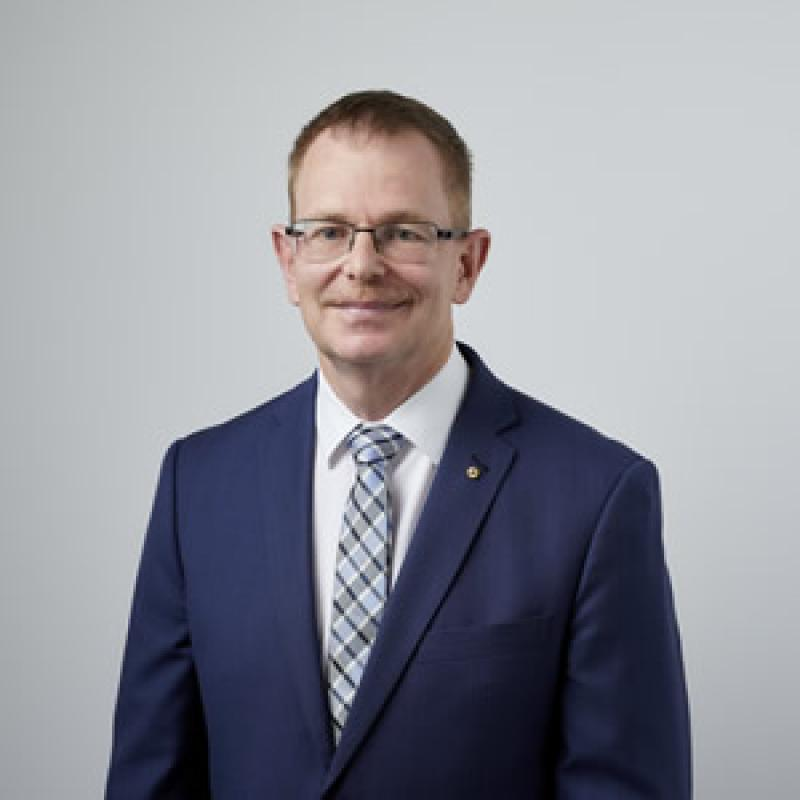

Member of Legislative Council of New South Wales
- In office 25 May 1991 – 23 March 2007

Personal details
- Born: John Francis Ryan; 20 September 1956 (age 70) Canada
- Party: Liberal Party
- Spouse: Alexandra
- Children: 1 son, 1 daughter
- Occupation: Teacher, research officer, public servant
- Website: NSW Parliamentary Library

John Francis Ryan AM (born 20 September 1956) is a former Australian politician. He was a Liberal Party member of the New South Wales Legislative Council from 1991 to 2007. He was the Liberal Deputy Leader in the Legislative Council from 2003 to 2007.

== Background ==
John Ryan was born in Canada, and migrated to Australia in 1961, attended Canterbury Boys High School. He came from a disadvantaged background. As a teenager he lived in an Anglican boys' home, during the 1970s. He studied teaching at the University of Sydney, worked as a high school teacher in English and History and as a senior research officer for former Liberal minister Ted Pickering prior to his election to parliament.

== Political career ==
Ryan joined the Liberal Party in 1983 while teaching in Sydney's traditionally Labor-voting western suburbs. He twice ran for the Legislative Assembly in the 1980s, contesting Earlwood in 1984 and Camden in 1988, but lost both times, the latter by only 31 votes. He also served on the party's state executive from 1988 to 1992. Ryan was elected to parliament on his third attempt in 1991, entering the Legislative Council after winning preselection for the safe fourth Liberal position on the coalition's ticket. He had gained the position as part of a moderate faction slate backed by his employer at the time, party powerbroker Pickering.

=== Social views ===
Though a committed evangelical Christian, Ryan was a prominent moderate within the party on social issues. He was a strong supporter of the leadership of Peter Collins and John Brogden, and clashed with the conservative wing of his party on a number of occasions. He supported initiatives such as a 1999 trial of medically supervised injecting rooms for heroin addicts, a 2001 bill to codify how parents might smack children and a 2003 bill to lower the age of consent for homosexual sex. However, early in his career he was opposed to further liberalisation of abortion laws, and opposed a 1993 bill that would have outlawed anti-gay hate speech.

Ryan took a strong interest of social justice, particularly concerning disability, child protection and protecting consumers from unscrupulous operators. He chaired an all-party Select Committee into the increase in the state's prison population in 2000 that unanimously recommended the abolition of jail sentences shorter than six months, following the lead of Western Australia, and proposed introducing Canadian house-style prisons for female inmates. The committee also found that up to 75% of female inmates suffered from an episode of mental illness prior to entering the criminal justice system. Ryan also instigated of a Joint Select Committee into the Quality of Building that resulted in a comprehensive rewriting of New South Wales consumer protection laws for the residential home building industry.

=== Offices held ===
Ryan was promoted to Shadow Parliamentary Secretary to the Leader of the Opposition in 2003, and rose rapidly after the 2003 state election, becoming Deputy Leader of the Liberal Party in the Legislative Council, Shadow Minister for Community Services and Shadow Minister for Disability.

As the Shadow Minister for Disability he advocated to have young people with disabilities removed from aged care nursing homes. The campaign bore fruit in 2006 when the Council of Australian Governments (COAG) agreed to a $244 million five-year program to move hundreds of people aged under 50 out of nursing homes across Australia. He successfully campaigned against savage budget cuts to day training programs for school leavers with disability that were introduced by the NSW Government in July 2004.

He advocated for the establishment of an Upper House Parliamentary inquiry into Post School Training programs that successfully recommended the restoration of funding to the programs and several other beneficial reforms. In a speech to the ACROD conference in February 2006 he outlined some new policies for disability services including direct funding of services to disability clients to enable them to have more choice and control over the services they received.

He was Deputy Leader of the Liberal Party in the Legislative Council between 2003 and 2007. At the time of his retirement he was Parliamentary Secretary for Disability Services and Ageing, having previously held a range of shadow portfolios including Community Services, Disability Services, Youth, Ageing, Commerce and Western Sydney.

Ryan's second term in office expired in 2007 amidst serious factional infighting within the Liberal Party. The rival conservative faction had gained increasing control of the party, and had defeated moderate MLC Patricia Forsythe and MLA Steven Pringle for preselection. Ryan emerged as a third target, and was challenged by former MLA Marie Ficarra. He was moderately supported by then-leader Peter Debnam, but was defeated. His term expired at the conclusion of the Parliament in March 2007.

=== Liberal Party membership suspension ===
Following the NSW Liberal party's loss in the 2007 state election Ryan attacked right wing Upper House Liberals David Clarke and Charlie Lynn for "diverting the party's intellectual firepower" from winning the State Election by concentrating on internal factional disputes. His comments were described by Liberal Leader Barry O'Farrell and NSW Liberal Party President Geoff Selig as a "dummy spit" but they recommended against punishing Ryan in order to prevent him from receiving "undeserved martyr status."

In June 2007 the NSW Liberal State Executive suspended Ryan's membership of the Liberal Party for two years for breaching the Party's media policy. While suspended, Ryan called on the Party Executive to adopt a similar approach following comments that Lynn had made about another former MP. Lynn was quoted as saying:

"John had a political career but he was rejected by the Liberal Party in south-west Sydney because of his support for ... progressive social issues."

In May 2008 Ryan supported efforts by Barry O'Farrell to quell factional infighting. Ryan commented:

"... genuine breakthrough does appear to be that the various warring groups within the Liberal party are at last beginning to talk to each other."

== Post-political career ==
In 2007 Ryan became a public servant working for the NSW Department of Ageing, Disability and Home Care. In 2013 he coordinated a program aimed at closing large residential institutions for people with disability such as the Westmead and Rydalmere Centres in Sydney, the Riverside Centre in Orange and the Stockton Centre in Newcastle.

In 2018 Ryan was appointed a Member of the Order of Australia "for significant service in the Parliament of NSW and to public administration, particularly the development of accommodation policy for people with disabilities".

In 2019 Ryan was appointed to serve as a commissioner to the Royal Commission into Violence, Abuse, Neglect and Exploitation of People with Disability.

== Royal Commission controversy ==
In April 2019, disability advocates and representative organisations across Australia joined together to demand that the two public servants appointed to the Royal Commission, John Ryan and Barbara Bennett, stood down from their duties.

In July 2019, Greens Senator Jordon Steele-John successfully sponsored a non-binding motion in the Australian Senate calling on the paper government to replace Mr Ryan and another former public servant Barbara Bennett. The Morrison government refused to back down on its appointments, arguing there no was conflict of interest jeopardising the commission's integrity.
