= Daniel's Law =

Queensland law establishing a public child sex offender register

Parliament of Queensland
- Long title: Community Protection and Public Child Sex Offender Register (Daniel's Law) Act 2025
- Citation: No. 25 of 2025
- Assented to: 6 November 2025
- Effective: 31 December 2025

Legislative history
- Introduced: 17 August 2025
- Third reading: 30 October 2025

Amends
- Child Protection (Offender Reporting and Offender Prohibition Order) Act 2004

Daniel's Law, formally the Community Protection and Public Child Sex Offender Register (Daniel's Law) Act 2025, is legislation enacted in the Australian state of Queensland that established the state's first public child sex offender register. The law was passed by the Queensland Parliament in August 2025 and came into effect on 31 December 2025. It is named in honour of Daniel Morcombe, a 13-year-old boy abducted and murdered on the Sunshine Coast in 2003 by a convicted child sex offender.

== Background ==
Daniel's Law followed long-standing advocacy for stronger child protection measures in Queensland, particularly by Daniel Morcombe's parents, Denise and Bruce Morcombe. The legislation was introduced to Parliament in August 2025 as part of a Queensland Government commitment to improve community access to information about child sex offenders. The bill received Royal Assent on 6 November 2025.

The aim of Daniel's Law is to enhance child safety by providing controlled public access to information about certain convicted child sex offenders who are subject to reporting obligations. The register is intended to assist parents, guardians and community members to make informed decisions and implement protective strategies for children.

== Eligibility and definitions ==
A reportable offender under Daniel's Law refers to persons listed on the Queensland Child Protection Register who have been convicted of certain child sex offences and are subject to reporting obligations under the Child Protection (Offender Reporting and Offender Prohibition Order) Act 2004. These obligations typically require offenders to report their personal details and whereabouts to police for designated periods.

To prevent misuse of the register for harassment or vigilante conduct, the legislation introduces new criminal offences with significant penalties. Misusing information from the register to intimidate, harass, or incite violence against an offender can attract penalties of up to 10 years' imprisonment, while unauthorised sharing of disclosure information carries up to three years' imprisonment.

== Structure of the register ==
Daniel's Law establishes a three-part public disclosure scheme administered by the Queensland Police Service.

1. Missing reportable offenders: This publicly visible page on the Daniel's Law website lists photographs, names, and years of birth of reportable offenders who have failed to comply with reporting obligations and whose current whereabouts are unknown to police
2. Locality searches: Queensland residents can apply to view photographs of reportable offenders residing in their local area. Applicants must provide proof of Queensland residency and meet identity verification requirements.
3. Parent and guardian applications: Parents and legal guardians of children can apply to determine whether an individual with unsupervised contact with their child is a current reportable offender.

== Reception ==
The Queensland Government allocated dedicated funding to implement the public register and emphasised measures to support its rollout. At launch, authorities reported that the system was active and operational for Queenslanders to use. Public and legal responses have been mixed. Proponents, including government officials and families affected by child sexual abuse, argue the register adds an important tool for community safety. Critics, including civil liberties groups and legal commentators, have raised concerns about effectiveness in reducing offending and the potential for misuse or unintended consequences.

== See also ==
- Sex offender registry
