= Ronald Sackville =

Australian judge

The Honourable Ronald Sackville AO FAAL KC
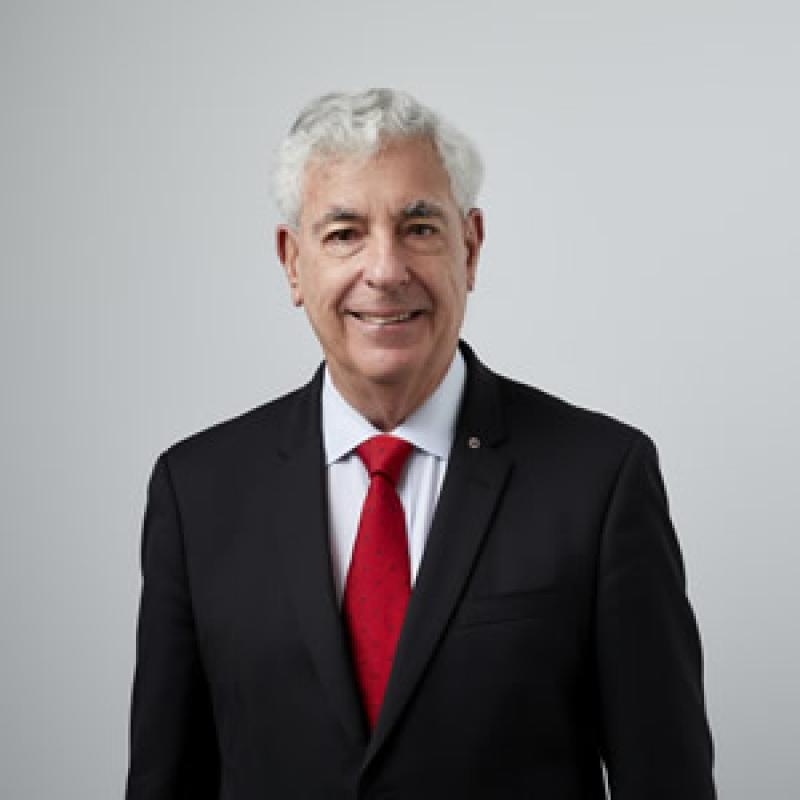

Chair of the Royal Commission into Violence, Abuse, Neglect and Exploitation of People with Disability
- In office 4 April 2019 – 23 September 2023

Judge of the New South Wales Court of Appeal
- In office 2008–2019

Judge of the Federal Court of Australia
- In office 19 September 1994 – 25 August 2008

Personal details
- Born: Ronald Sackville Melbourne, Victoria

Ronald Sackville AO FAAL KC is a former acting judge of the Court of Appeal of the Supreme Court of New South Wales, a former judge of the Federal Court of Australia, and the former Chair of the Royal Commission into Violence, Abuse, Neglect and Exploitation of People with Disability.

== Education ==
Sackville is a graduate of the University of Melbourne (where he was editor of the Melbourne University Law Review) and Yale University.

== Career ==
Sackville was professor of law (1972–1985) and dean of the faculty of law (1979–1981) at the University of New South Wales. He was also associate in law at the University of California, Berkeley (1966–1967), and senior lecturer in Law at the University of Melbourne (1967–1972).

He served as Commissioner for Law and Poverty on the Australian Government Commission of Inquiry into Poverty (1973–1975); chairman of the South Australian Royal Commission into the Non-Medical Use of Drugs (1977–1979); chairman of the New South Wales Law Reform Commission (1981–1984); part-time member of the Commonwealth Schools Commission (1984–1985); part-time chairman of the Victorian Accident Compensation Commission (1985–1989); and chair of the Commonwealth Access to Justice Advisory Committee (1993–1994). He was also an assistant commissioner of the Independent Commission Against Corruption (New South Wales) (1992); and chair of the Judicial Conference of Australia, a body representing judicial officers throughout Australia (2004–2006).

Sackville practised as a barrister in Sydney from 1985 until 1994. He was appointed Queen’s Counsel in 1991. He served as a judge of the Federal Court of Australia from 1994-2008, and as an acting judge of the Court of Appeal of the Supreme Court of NSW from 2008-2019. He has also been a judge on the Supreme Court of Fiji (2006–2009), and a member of the Civil and Commercial Court of Qatar (2006–2012).

Sackville has held many academic posts, including visiting appointments at York University (Toronto), University of Oxford, McGill University (Montreal), Cardozo Law School, Yeshiva University (New York), Cornell University (New York), New York University, and the University of NSW (Sydney). He was also an adjunct professor of law at the University of Technology Sydney (2008) and the University of Sydney (2008–2009).

On 27 July 2007 Justice Sackville delivered his judgment in Seven Network Limited v News Limited [2007] FCA 1062, one of the most expensive pieces of litigation in Australian history. That case involved a complaint by Australia's Channel Seven television network that it was forced to shut down its pay television sports channels business due to anti-competitive conduct by a range of other Australian media companies including News, PBL and Telstra between 1999 and 2001. Sackville found that no such anti-competitive conduct existed. This case has become an example for the University of New South Wales.

From 4 April 2019 until 29 September 2023, Justice Sackville was the Chair of the Royal Commission into Violence, Abuse, Neglect and Exploitation of People with Disability.

== Honours ==
In the Australia Day Honours of 2009, he was named an Officer of the Order of Australia for "service to the administration of the Australian judicial system, to the reform of federal and state law, and to legal education." He was appointed Queen's Counsel in 1991, and was awarded a Doctor of Laws (LLD) (Honoris Causa) by the University of NSW in 2002.
