= Kendall, New South Wales =

Kendall
- Town
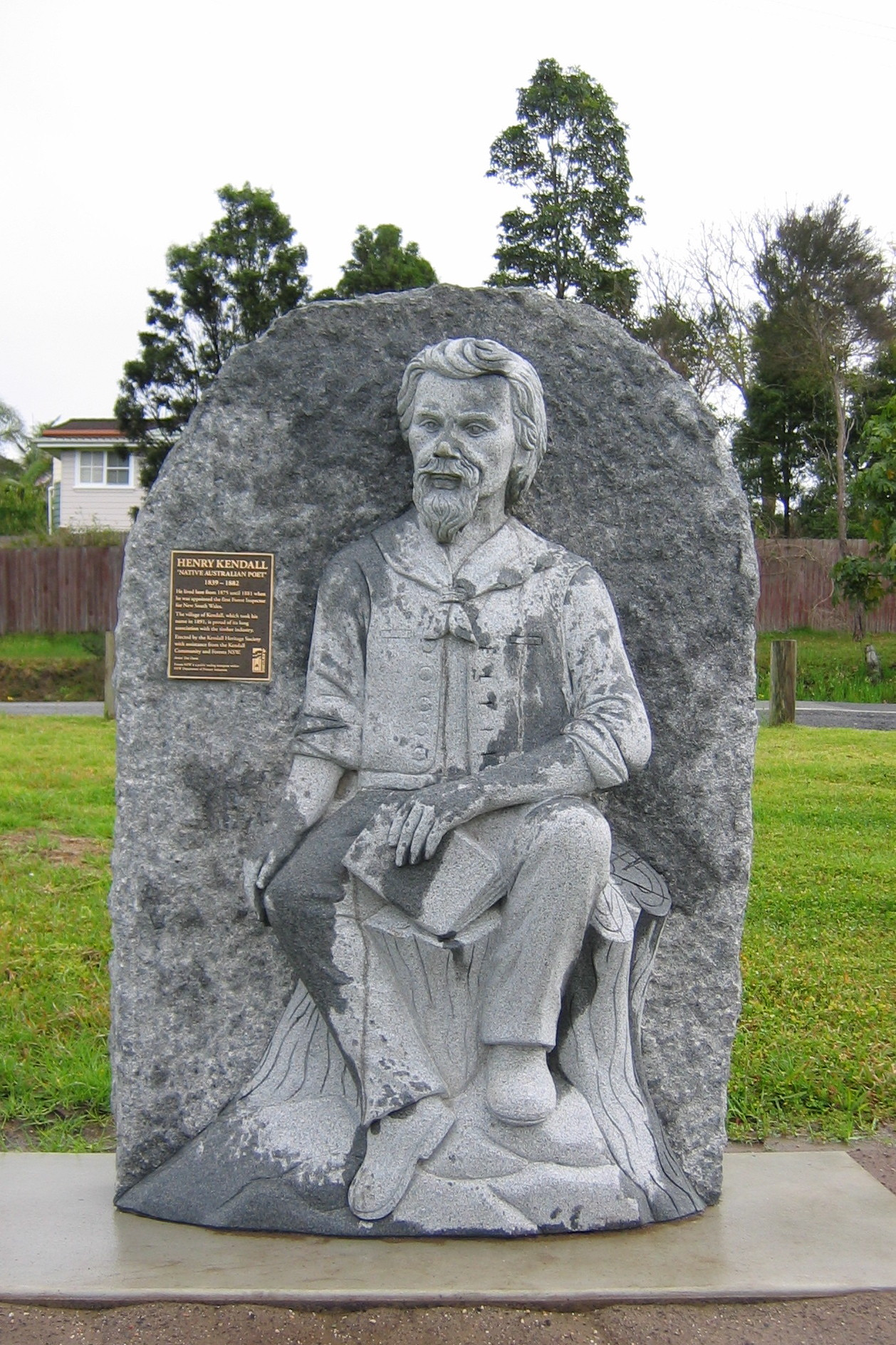
- Henry Kendall statue in a town park

- Coordinates: 31°38′S 152°42′E
- Country: Australia
- State: New South Wales
- City: Camden Haven
- LGA: Port Macquarie-Hastings Council
- Location: 36 km (22 mi) from Port Macquarie

Government
  - State electorate: Port Macquarie
  - Federal division: Lyne

Population
  - Total: 890 (2021 census)
- Postcode: 2439

Kendall is a town on the Mid North Coast of New South Wales, Australia.

Kendall is located 3 kilometres west from Kew and 36 kilometres southwest of Port Macquarie via the Pacific Highway. It is one of the seven villages that make up the Camden Haven region of the Port Macquarie/Hastings Local Government Area. At the 2021 census, it had a population of 890 people.

Kendall has a Post Office, general store selling gourmet food and catering, additionally occasionally opening a pop-up restaurant across the road, bottle shop, take away food shop, Community Op-Shop, Cafe down near the river, Services & Citizens Club, Community Centre (in the School of Arts building), Services Australia Access Point, used book shop, Coastline Bank, modern tennis courts, aquatic centre with a 25m swimming pool, a restored historic wharf, and Kendall Craft Co-Op.

- Middle Brother National Park, located on the slopes of Middle Brother Mountain which was named by Captain James Cook
- Poet's Walk
- Kendall Showground has camping facilities (when events are not on).

== History ==
The Birpai (also known as Birrbay) people have lived in this area for more than 40,000 years.

Kendall was originally named Camden Heads, as it is located on the Camden Haven River. It was renamed Kendall, in 1891, after the Australian poet Henry Kendall, and not, as some tourists suspect, after the similarly spelled ancient town of Kendal in the County of Cumbria in England. Henry Kendall lived in the area from 1875 to 1881 when he was the first Forest Inspector for New South Wales.

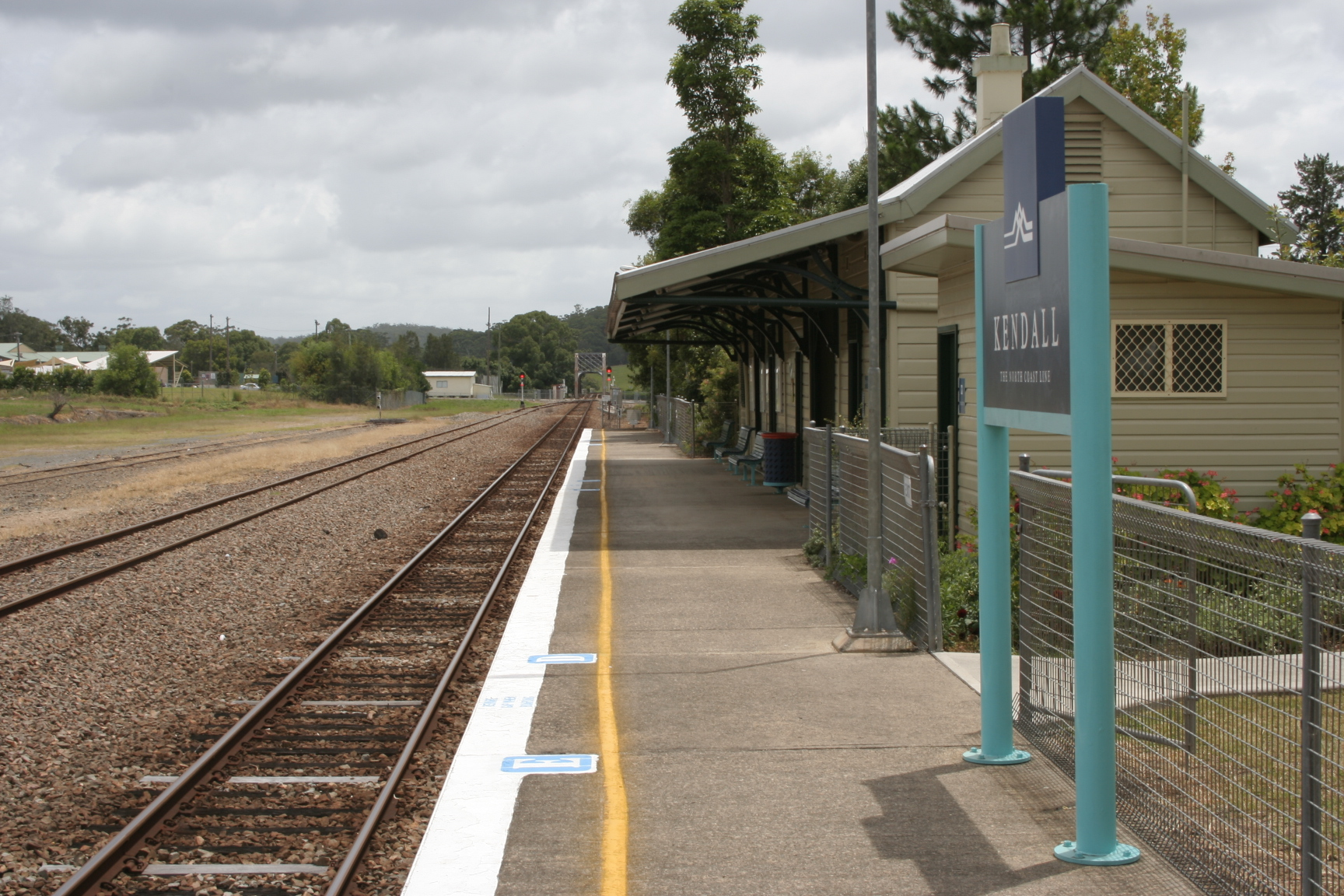
Kendall railway station

== Heritage listings ==
Kendall has a number of heritage-listed sites, including:

- Comboyne Street: Kendall School of Arts

== Population ==
Historical population
Year	Pop.	±%
1966	533	—
1971	506	−5.1%
1976	513	+1.4%
1981	522	+1.8%
1986	658	+26.1%
1991	713	+8.4%
1996	715	+0.3%
2001	736	+2.9%
2006	756	+2.7%
2011	833	+10.2%
2016	863	+3.6%
2021	890	+3.1%
Source: Australian Bureau of Statistics data.

In the 2021 Census, there were 890 people in Kendall. 90.1% of people were born in Australia and 96.1% of people spoke only English at home. The most common responses for religion were No Religion 47.8%, Anglican 24.2% and Catholic 12.0%.

== Sport ==
The most popular sport in Kendall is rugby league. The local team, known as the Kendall Blues, play in the Hastings District Rugby League.

== Transport ==
Kendall railway station is served by three XPT services daily from Sydney on the North Coast railway line.

== Notable people ==
- William Tyrell – Missing child that sparked a nationwide manhunt.

== See also ==
- Disappearance of William Tyrrell
