= Roslyn Atkinson =

Australian judge

The Honourable Justice Roslyn Atkinson AO
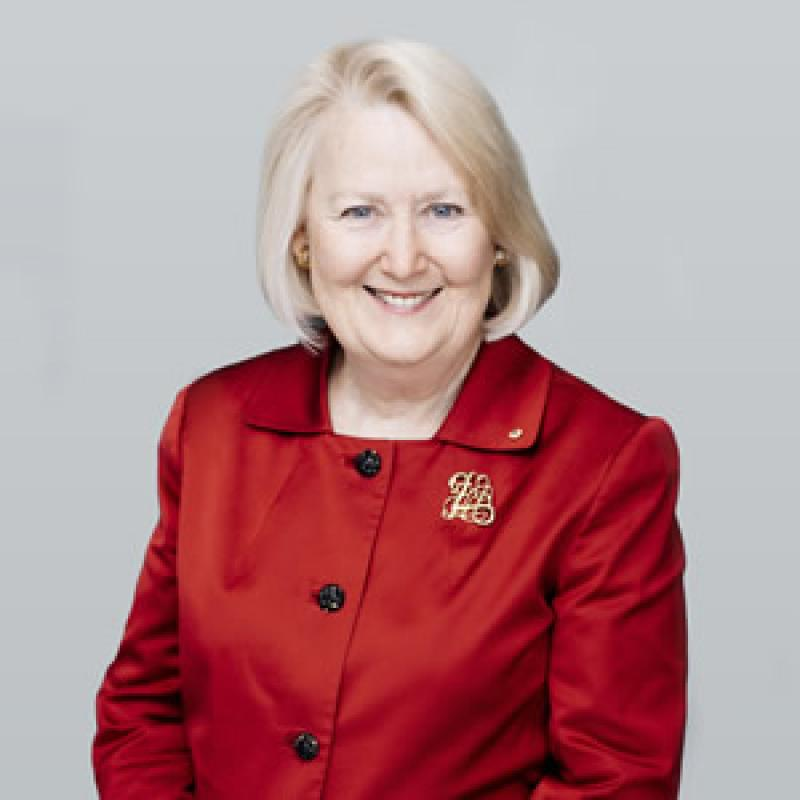

Justice of the Supreme Court of Queensland
- In office 3 September 1998 – 29 November 2018
- Appointed by: Major General Peter Arnison

Personal details
- Born: Roslyn Gay Atkinson; 30 November 1948 (age 77) Brisbane, Queensland, Australia

Roslyn Gay Atkinson AO (born 30 November 1948 in Brisbane, Queensland) is a former Justice of the Supreme Court of Queensland, who served for 20 years from 1998 until her retirement in 2018. In 2002 she also became the Chairperson of the Queensland Law Reform Commission, and served in that role until her retirement in 2013. As well as being responsible for the Yankee Doodles precedent, Justice Atkinson has also made two notable decisions in her capacity as member of the Queensland Legal Practice Tribunal.

== Pre-judicial career ==
Justice Atkinson began her career as a teacher, from 1970 to 1974. She then became an actor and theatre administrator from 1974 to 1978, before becoming a lecturer of literature, Drama, Film and Australian Studies at the Queensland Institute of Technology. In 1985 she entered the legal profession by becoming an articled clerk at Feez Ruthning (which later merged with what is now Allens). The following year she was an Associate to the Honourable Justice Brennan, then a Justice of the High Court of Australia. She was admitted to the bar in 1987 and practised there until her appointment to the Supreme Court.

== Judicial career ==
=== Yankee Doodles ===
Justice Atkinson is perhaps most famous for her judgment in the case of Yankee Doodles v Blemvale Pty Ltd, an oft-quoted and highly influential case in Queensland which shaped the law relating to when courts will exercise their discretion whether to set aside default judgments against defendants.

The plaintiff had obtained judgment for recovery of possession of land, mesne profits and costs, and the defendant had made application to have the judgment set aside.

After rejecting the defendant's argument that judgment had been irregularly entered, her Honour discussed the circumstances in which the court will set aside a regularly obtained default judgment, reiterating that the defendant providing a satisfactory explanation for the failure to appear and the length of delay for making the application are both factors that the court will consider. However, citing the Australian Capital Territory case of Sue Oclee Pty Ltd v Bak, her Honour went on to emphasise the requirement for the defendant to have a prima facie defence on the merits:

The decision whether or not to set aside a default judgment is discretionary. An affidavit in support of an application to set aside judgment entered into in default of appearance to a writ of summons must set out all the defences on which the defendant intends to rely and briefly set out the facts by which the defendant seeks to establish such defences. A mere statement by the defendant that he or she has a good defence is not sufficient to justify a review of the exercise of judicial discretion. The defendant must demonstrate "a very compelling reason" for the failure to appear and that it has a plausible defence either in law or in fact. Before allowing a defendant to come in and defend, the court should have before it material which enables it to say how it came about that the defendant found itself bound by a judgment regularly entered; that the defendant genuinely desires to be allowed to come in and present its case; and that issues are raised in such a form as to require serious consideration of the defence put forward.

Observing that the defendant did not exhibit or tender any proposed defence to the action, Justice Atkinson concluded that it did "not appear to have a plausible defence such as would cause the court to exercise its discretion to set aside the default judgment". As a result, her Honour dismissed the defendant's application to set aside the default judgment.

=== Legal Practice Tribunal v Tampoe ===
The case of Legal Practice Tribunal v Tampoe [2009] QLPT 14 was before the Queensland Legal Practice Tribunal, then the main disciplinary body for legal practitioners in Queensland. Justice Atkinson was a member of that tribunal, and was the judge which heard the matter.

Tampoe, the respondent, a solicitor and principal of a law firm, had acted for convicted drug smuggler Schapelle Corby. It was in acting for her that Tampoe was accused of breaching client confidentiality, after he disclosed Corby's criminal history in a television interview published on 26 June 2005 on the Channel 9 program Sunday. He was also charged with bringing the legal profession into disrepute, after he also referred to Corby and her family in disparaging terms in a documentary to be shown on Australian television, and claimed that he had invented a defence for Corby alleging that baggage-handlers had planted the drugs, when this is not part of a defence lawyer's role. Tampoe accepted all of the allegations as particularised.

Justice Atkinson wrote that "the person who has behaved in the way particularised is not suitable to be a legal practitioner", before making an order recommending that Tampoe's name be removed from the roll of legal practitioners.

As a result, Tampoe was removed from the roll, meaning that he is no longer eligible to practice as a solicitor or a barrister.

=== Legal Services Commissioner v Dempsey ===
The case of Legal Services Commissioner v Dempsey [2009] QLPT 20 was a Discipline Application brought before the Tribunal against Townsville solicitor Paul Dempsey, who was charged with six counts of misconduct arising from his dealings with two different clients.

Dempsey acted for the first client in a matrimonial matter, and was accused of having failed to maintain proper standards of competence and diligence, misleading the client, drawing his client's funds from the trust account into his general account when he was not entitled to do so and misleading the Queensland Law Society. Dempsey acted for the second client in a personal injuries matter and was accused of over-charging, as well as preferring his own interests to that of his client.

Dempsey contested all six changes, however, the Tribunal accepted the evidence of the clients over Dempsey's, and in so doing found Dempsey guilty of four counts of professional misconduct and two counts of unsatisfactory professional conduct. The judgment was scathing of Dempsey. Discussing Dempsey's claim that he had a meeting with the matrimonial client, which was at odds with a letter he sent her and a diary note, Justice Atkinson remarked that:

Mr Dempsey’s letter of 2 October 2006 is entirely inconsistent with the meeting’s having taken place. He said he believed he dictated that letter on the afternoon of 28 September. Not only does it not refer to a meeting which on Mr Dempsey’s version had occurred only hours earlier on the day it was dictated, it concludes with the words, “If you have got any questions please do not hesitate to contact me or come in and see me. I have been trying to get you in to discuss this with you, but we have been missing each other.” Given the difficulty this placed him in, he then posited that perhaps he drafted the letter before he saw her and signed a letter which said they had not seen each other without really reading it. This was an adventitious explanation. This contemporaneous document under Mr Dempsey’s hand reveals the truth. There was no such meeting and Mr Dempsey’s protestations in evidence that he clearly remembers such a meeting were false. His evidence reveals why he said there was a meeting when there was not… He could not possibly justify taking the $30,000 unless he had told her about it and she had agreed to it.

Two months later, the Tribunal reconvened and made the finding that Dempsey had been dishonest and misleading when giving evidence to the Tribunal. The Tribunal then effectively terminated Dempsey's legal career when Justice Atkinson concluded that:

The courts, fellow practitioners and clients cannot have confidence in a legal practitioner who has been untruthful on oath. A person who has been found guilty of the counts of professional misconduct and unsatisfactory professional conduct alleged in this matter and displayed such dishonesty on the disciplinary hearing is not a fit and proper person to be entrusted with the duties and responsibilities of a legal practitioner and the Tribunal recommends that his name be removed from the roll under s 456(2) of the 2007 Act.

As a result, Dempsey was removed from the roll, resulting in the end of his legal career.

The following year, Dempsey appealed the Tribunal's decision, but the Court of Appeal dismissed the appeal. In 2011, Dempsey applied for special leave to appeal in the High Court of Australia. On 9 June 2011, Justices Gummow and Kiefel refused special leave, noting that "The application to this Court does not seek to advance any ground that would justify a grant of special leave to appeal and the applicant enjoys no prospect of success in this Court."

=== Murder of Daniel Morcombe ===
In 2014, Atkinson presided over the trial of Brett Peter Cowan, who was found guilty of the murder of Daniel Morcombe. Atkinson sentended Cowan to life imprisonment with a non-parole period of 20 years.

== Honours ==
At the 2015 Australia Day Honours, Justice Atkinson was appointed an Officer of the Order of Australia for distinguished service to the judiciary and to law reform in Queensland, through contributions to the legal profession and to promoting awareness of issues of injustice and inequality in Australia and internationally.
