= Manufacturing in Australia =

Adults employed in the manufacturing industry as a percentage of the adult population in Australia divided geographically by statistical local area, as of the 2011 census

Income from sales of goods and services by manufacturers ($ millions) since 1985

Manufacturing in Australia peaked in the 1960s at 25% of the country's gross domestic product, and has since dropped below 10%. At one stage manufacturing employed almost a third of Australia's workforce. Automotive manufacturing in Australia began in the 1920s and came to an end in 2017.

Australia's greatest manufacturing achievement was the manufacture of the Beaufort, a twin-engined torpedo bomber, during World War II. Australia's manufacturing sector is diverse with the largest sub-industries being food, beverage and tobacco, machinery and equipment, petroleum, coal and chemicals and metal products.

== History ==
Quarterly gross operating profits ($millions) in the manufacturing industry since 1994

Australia's export price index for manufactured goods since 1990

Australia's import price index for manufactured goods since 1981

The manufacture of small steam engines began in the 1830s. The majority of Australia's manufacturing was undertaken in the capital cities and Newcastle because of their proximity to shipping and rail hubs. Working conditions were poor with little regard to health and safety. Child labour was endemic. The clothing and footwear industries were particularly bad. In 1901, Australia's first blast furnace began producing steel near Lithgow in New South Wales. The furnace remains are now heritage listed as the Lithgow Blast Furnace. Another steel mill was opened in 1915 in Newcastle by BHP. Soon more steelworks opened in Whyalla and Port Kembla.

Due to a lack of imports during World War I, Australia saw a boost to manufacturing. The steel industry saw an increase in production as did the manufacture of aspirin and chlorine. The 1920s saw the introduction of car manufacturing in Australia with both Ford and General Motors opening factories. The first Australian-made bottle of Coca-Cola was made in 1938. The Government Aircraft Factories was established in 1939 to manufacture aircraft in Australia.

Manufacturing in Australia experienced an exceptional boom during World War II and the two decades that followed. Local manufacturers were assisted by protectionist tariffs. The Jackson Committee was established in 1974 by the Whitlam government of Australia to advise on policies for Australia's manufacturing industry. The tariffs were cut in the 1980s and early 1990s. Workers in iron, steel, auto, white goods, textiles, clothing and footwear industries were particularly hard hit. It wasn't long before new markets in Asian countries such as China and Japan opened up with much cheaper imports now possible.

The contribution of manufacturing to Australia's gross domestic product peaked in the 1960s at 25%, and had dropped to 13% by 2001–2 and 10.5% by 2005–6. In 2004–05, the manufacturing industry exported products worth $67,400 million, and employed 1.1 million people.

Australia's economic complexity -- a measure of a country's ability to manufacture and export complex goods -- was ranked 102nd in the world in 2024. The Economic Complexity Index rankings are compiled by the Harvard Kennedy School's Growth Lab. Tim Cheston, Senior Research Manager at the Growth Lab, commented on Australia's sustained fall in the rankings: “You have fallen just behind Bangladesh and Senegal in what you’re able to produce within your goods exports today… Also Australia has fallen from its ranking of 63rd in the year 2000".

In 2000–2001, $3.3 billion was spent on assistance to the manufacturing industry, with 40% going to the textile, clothing and footwear industry and the passenger motor vehicle industry. At that time, manufacturing accounted for 48% of exports, and 45% of Australian research and development. From 2000, the resource boom saw the Australian dollar soar on exchanges, making exports expensive on the global stage and imports exceptionally cheap.

In 2007, the breakdown of manufacturing by state, and the fraction of gross state product (GSP) which it contributed, were as follows:

State	Percentage of national manufacturing	Percentage of GSP
New South Wales	32	10
Victoria	28	12
Queensland	17	9
South Australia	8	13
Western Australia	10	8
Tasmania	3	13
Northern Territory	1	7
Australian Capital Territory	0.5	2

Between 2001 and 2007, the approximate breakdown by industry changed as follows:

Industry	Percent in 2001	Percent in 2007
Food, beverages and tobacco	19	19
Textile, clothing and footwear	5	3
Wood and paper products	7	6
Printing, publishing and recorded media	10	10
Petroleum, coal and chemical products	15	14
Non-metal mineral products	4	5
Metal products	18	19
Machinery and equipment	17	19
Other manufacturing	4	4

By 2021 the number of people employed in manufacturing dropped to 6.2% of the workforce. In 2025, Incat Tasmania manufactured the world's largest battery-electric ship.

== Food processing ==
Quarterly sales by Australian manufacturing businesses of food products ($A millions) since 1985

The food and beverage manufacturing industry is the largest in Australia. The sectors include the following:

Sector	Turnover (2005–$06, million)
Meat and meat products	17,836
Beverage and malt manufacturing	13,289
Dairy products	9,991
Sugar and confectionery manufacturing	6,456
Fruit and vegetable processing	4,672
Bakery products	4,005
Flour mill and cereal food manufacturing	3,692
Oil and fat manufacturing	1,547
Seafood processing	1,330 *
Other food manufacturing	8,554
Total	71,372

* Before the 2010 closure of the Port Lincoln Tuna cannery

== Textile industry ==
Until trade liberalisation in the mid-1980s, Australia had a large textile industry. This decline continued through the first decade of the 21st century. Since the 1980s, tariffs have steadily been reduced; in early 2010, the tariffs were reduced from 17.5 percent to 10 percent on clothing, and 7.5–10% to 5% for footwear and other textiles. As of 2010, most textile manufacturing, even by Australian companies, is performed in Asia.

Total employment in Australian textile, clothing and footwear manufacturing (thousands of people) since 1984

== Motor vehicles ==
As of 2008, four companies mass-produced cars in Australia. Mitsubishi ceased production in March 2008, followed by Ford in 2016, and Holden and Toyota in 2017.

Holden bodyworks were manufactured at Elizabeth, South Australia and engines were produced at the Fishermans Bend plant in Port Melbourne. In 2006, Holden's export revenue was just under A$1.3 billion. In March 2012, Holden was given a $270 million lifeline by the Australian government. In return, Holden planned to inject over $1 billion into car manufacturing in Australia. They estimated the new investment package would return around $4 billion to the Australian economy and see GM Holden continue making cars in Australia until at least 2022. However, Holden announced on 11 December 2013 that Holden cars would no longer be manufactured in Australia from the end of 2017.

Ford had two main factories, both in Victoria: located in the Geelong suburb of Norlane and the northern Melbourne suburb of Broadmeadows. Both plants were closed down in October 2016.

Until 2006, Toyota had factories in Port Melbourne and Altona, after which all manufacturing was performed at Altona. In 2008, Toyota exported 101,668 vehicles worth $1,900 million. In 2011 the figures were "59,949 units worth $1,004 million". On 10 February 2014 it was announced that by the end of 2017 Toyota would cease manufacturing vehicles and engines in Australia.

In March 2012, a new Australian auto maker, Tomcar, announced they are to build a new factory in Melbourne.

Company	Location	Assembly	Opened	Closed
Ford Australia	Geelong VIC	Cars	Example	2016 TBC
Ford Australia	Broadmeadows VIC	Example	Example	Example
Holden	Port Melbourne VIC	Engines	Example	2016 TBC
Holden	Elizabeth SA	Cars	Example	2017 TBC

== Chemical industry ==
Quarterly sales by Australian manufacturing businesses of basic chemicals and chemical products ($A millions) since 1985

Total employment in basic chemicals and chemical product manufacturing in Australia (thousands of people) since 1984

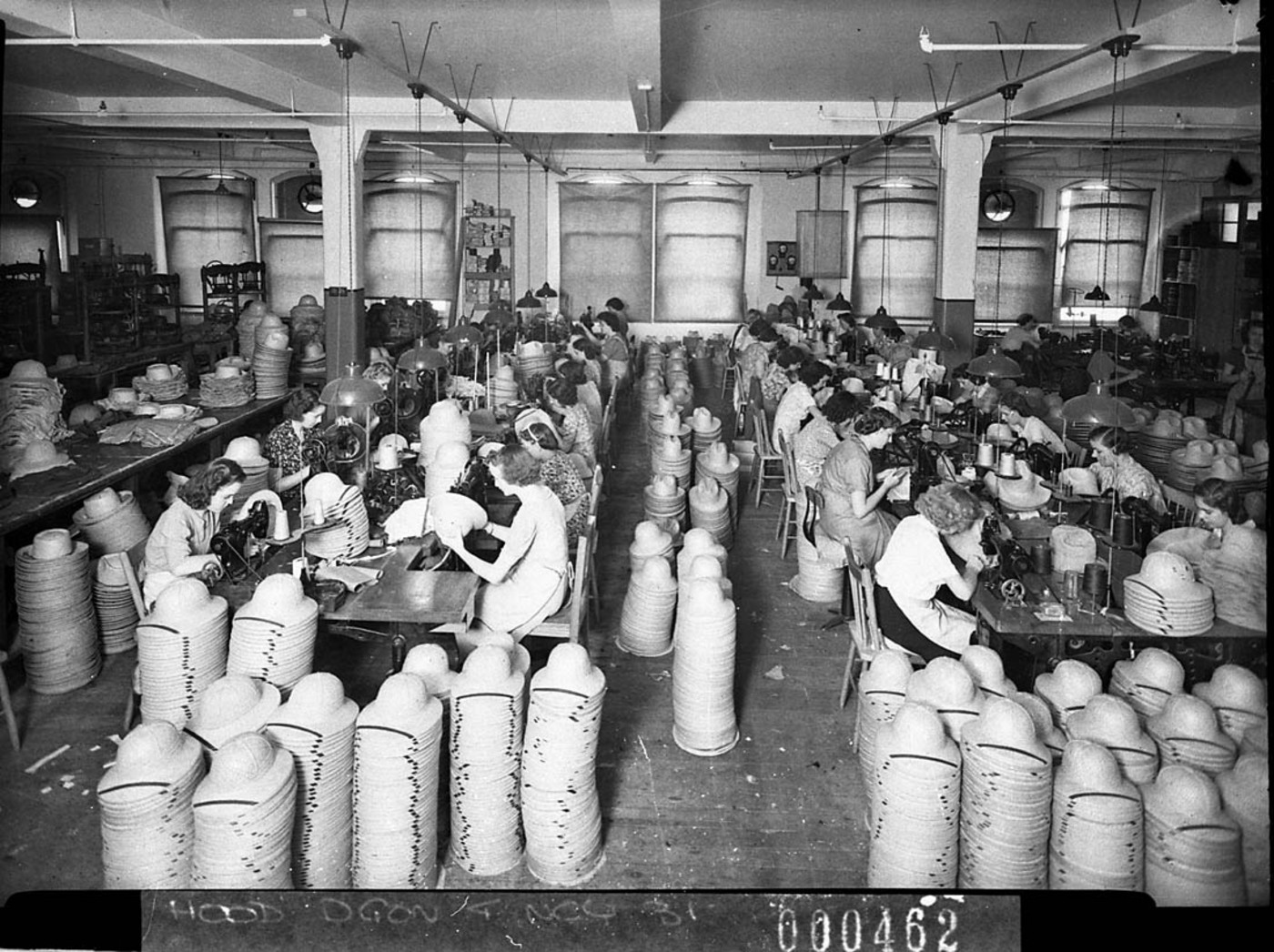
Making hats on the factory floor, 1941

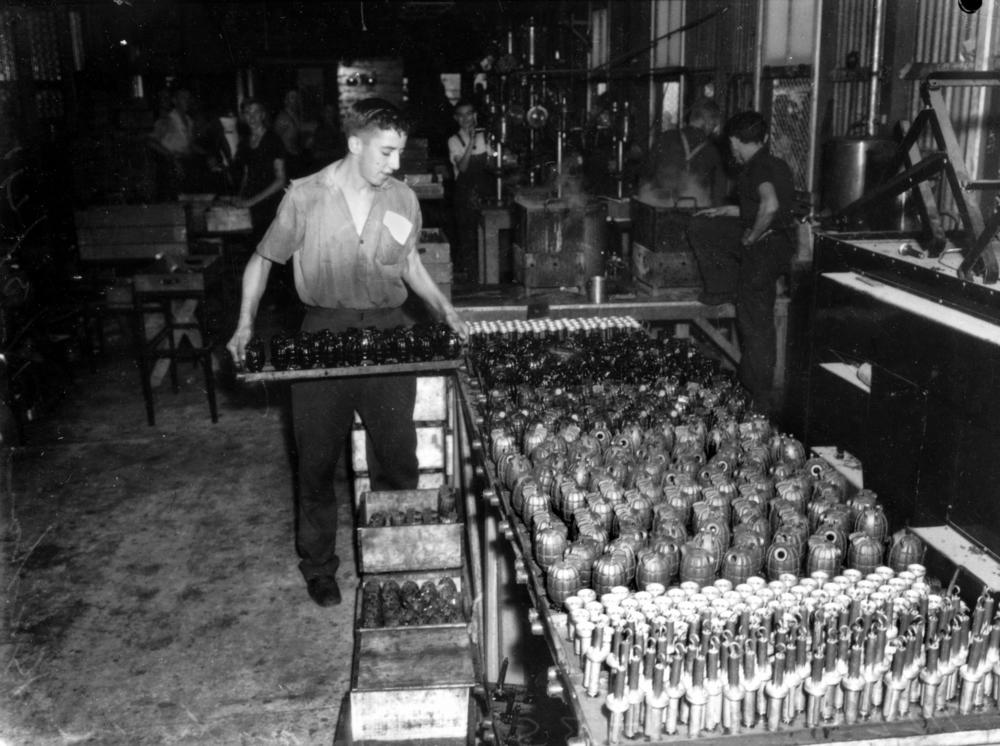
Hand grenade manufacturing, 1942

Australia has a chemical industry, including the manufacture of many petrochemicals.

Many mining companies, such as BHP and Comalco, perform initial processing of raw materials. Similarly, Australia's agriculture feeds into the chemical industry. Tasmania produces 40% of the world's raw narcotic materials; some of this is locally converted into codeine and other pharmaceuticals in Tasmania by Tasmanian Alkaloids, owned by Johnson and Johnson, while GlaxoSmithKline processes some of the resulting poppy straw in Victoria.

== Trains ==
Trains are manufactured in Ballarat by Alstom. At Torbanlea the Queensland Train Manufacturing Program constructs trains including 65 new passenger trains due to enter service from 2027. In Bellevue trains are constructed for the Perth rail network.

Locomotives are made in Broadmeadow by UGL.

== Companies with manufacturing facilities in Australia ==
A partial list of companies operating manufacturing facilities in Australia, with their most important products.

=== Australian-owned ===
==== Consumer ====
- ADINA Watches
- Akubra
- Bellroy
- Cole Clark
- Cue
- Driza-Bone
- Malvern Star
- Jarrahdale Wood Heaters
- Maton
- Mrs Mac's Pies
- Nippy's
- Paspaley
- Pental
- RM Williams
- Riviera Australia
- Røde Microphones
- Rosella
- Saxbys Soft Drinks
- Tharwa Valley Forge
- Vegemite
- Visy

==== Industrial ====
- Amcor
- Arrium
- BHP
- BlueScope
- Boral
- Bradken
- CSR
- Downer Group
- Forgacs Marine & Defence
- Incat
- Orica
- Rio Tinto
- Richardson Devine Marine
- Sutton Tools
- UGL Rail

=== International ===
- Apex Tool Group
- Australian Paper (Nippon Paper)
- Cadbury Chocolate
- Cement Australia (Holcim)
- Electrolux (ovens)
- Ingredion
- Iveco
- Kenworth
- Nyrstar
- Owens Illinois
- Rheem
- Volvo Trucks
- WD-40 Company

== Companies that no longer manufacture in Australia ==
Companies that closed down, or moved manufacturing offshore.

Australian Owned:

- Hanes Australasia Clothing
- South Pacific Tyres (Ansell/Goodyear) Tyres
- Downs & Son

International:

- Ford Australia
- Holden (General Motors)
- Sidchrome
- Bridgestone
- Mitsubishi Motors Australia
- Nissan Motor Australia
- Toyota Australia

== See also ==
- Australian Made
- Ausbuy
- Balance of payments of Australia
