= Australian Made logo =

National production certification mark

Australian Made, Australian Grown logo
- Trade name: Australian Made Campaign Limited (AMCL)
- Headquarters: Melbourne, Victoria, Australia
- Website: www.australianmade.com.au

The Australian Made, Australian Grown logo (also known as the Australian Made logo or AMAG logo) is a registered certification trade mark logo and country of origin label that certifies that a product has been manufactured or grown in Australia. The triangular green-and-gold logo, featuring a kangaroo, was introduced in 1986. The Australian Made, Australian Grown logo is administered by Australian Made Campaign Limited (AMCL).

== History ==
In the 1930s a group of businesses gathered up and created a media campaign to publicise Australian made products.

Logo (1961-1986)

In 1961, a national "Buy Australian" campaign was introduced by the Associated Chambers of Manufacturers of Australia. The campaign was launched by Prime Minister Robert Menzies in May 1961. The campaign was colloquially known at the time as Operation Boomerang. A red boomerang on a blue circular background depicting the Southern Cross.

In 1986, a new green-and-gold coloured "Australian Made" logo featuring a stylised kangaroo in a triangle was launched as part of the "Australian Made" campaign launched by Prime Minister Bob Hawke on 31 August 1986. The logo was designed by Ken Cato.

In 2002, the Australian Government transferred ownership and management of the Australian Made logo to Australian Made Campaign Limited (AMCL) through a Deed of Assignment and Management with the Australian Government. AMCL is a not-for-profit organisation that administers the logo through third party verification processes and regular audits to ensure that only products that are genuinely manufactured (substantially transformed) or grown in Australia are licensed to carry the logo.

In 2016, the Australian Government changed food labelling laws to add a bar showing the percentage of Australian ingredients for any product made in Australia. Australian food products sold domestically are no longer able to use the AMAG certification trade mark as a standalone country of origin symbol. However, the new labelling requirements are not mandated for exported food products. Businesses wishing to use the AMAG logo on exported food have the option of using the new labels or using the logo under a licence with Australia Made. The Australian Government is funding the ACCC to manage compliance of the new country of origin labels for food products.

South Africa, New Zealand, and Canada have consulted with Australian Made on developing their own branding campaigns.

== Definitions ==
The AMCL Code of Practice outlines the requirements that a product must have to be licensed to use the Australian Made logo.

In Part 1, the Code of Practice states:

The Australian Made Logo certification trade mark was created by the Australian Government in 1986 to promote Australian made products in local and export markets. The logo provides information to consumers in Australia and overseas that goods using the logo have met particular requirements under Australian law to be able to be described as of Australian origin.

In order to qualify for a license to use the Australian Made logo, a product must be “substantially transformed” in Australia. The Code of Practice states that “a good has been substantially transformed in a particular country if the good:

a. was grown in a particular country (where each ingredient or significant component of the good was grown in that country; and all, or virtually all, processes involved in the production or manufacture of the good happened in that country); or

1. is the produce or product of a particular country (where the country was the country of origin of each significant ingredient or significant component of the good; and all, or virtually all, processes involved in the production or manufacture of the good happened in that country); or

2. as a result of one or more processes undertaken in that country, is fundamentally different in identity, nature or essential character from all of its ingredients or components that were imported into that country

The cost of using the Australian Made logo is between AUD$300 +GST and AUD$25,000 +GST, depending on sales revenue.

== Campaigns ==
The Australian Made logo is used as a marketing tool for Australian businesses, because it is seen as a symbol of authenticity and certifies a product as genuinely made or grown in Australia. Roy Morgan research has shown that 99% of Australians recognise the Australian Made logo, 93% of Australians are confident that products that carry the logo are genuinely Australian, 97% associate local jobs with the logo, and 94% associate the logo with safety and high quality.

In 2021 Australian Made Campaign Ltd launched the first Australian Made Week – an annual multi-channel media campaign that encourages Australian shoppers to buy local products and look out for the iconic green and gold kangaroo logo when they shop, and also promote licensed Australian Made products and businesses. It has been held in May every year so far except for 2022.

Since 2021 the media campaign has run each year with the following ambassadors:

- 2021: Australian Made Week Ambassador, Elyse Knowles (Australian model and TV personality)
- 2022: Australian Made Week Ambassador, Adam Liaw (Australian cook, television presenter and author)
- 2023: Australian Made Week Ambassador, Ash Barty (Tennis champion, author, former Young Australian of the Year)
- 2024: Australian Made Week Ambassador, Jessica Mauboy (singer-songwriter and actress)
- 2025:Australian Made Week Ambassador, Ariarne Titmus (swimming champion)

== See also ==
- Products manufactured in Australia
- Australia Made Preference League (1920s)
- Buy Australian Logo (since 2012)
- Ausbuy (1991-2016)
