= Pental (company) =

Australian manufacturer of cleaning products

Pental Limited
- Formerly: Symex Holdings Limited (until 2013)
- Type: Public
- Traded as: ASX: PTL (formerly ASX: SYM as Symex)
- Industry: Consumer goods, household chemicals
- Founded: 1954; 72 years ago (Pental soap business, Shepparton); 29 August 2000 (Symex Holdings, ASX listing)
- Fate: Consumer products business divested to DuluxGroup in November 2023; remaining entity renamed Prestal Holdings Limited
- Successor: Selleys (consumer brands and Shepparton facility); Prestal Holdings Limited (remaining entity)
- Headquarters: Altona North, Victoria, Australia
- Area served: Australia, New Zealand, Asia
- Products: Soap, bleach, firelighters, laundry detergent, dishwashing liquid, toothpaste, fabric softener
- Website: pental.com.au

Pental Limited was an Australian manufacturer of household chemicals and cleaning products, and a publicly listed company on the Australian Stock Exchange.

Previously known as Symex, it manufactured, imported, distributed and exported many brands including:

- AIM Toothpaste
- Country Life Soap
- Hillmark
- Huggie Fabric Softener
- Janola
- Jiffy Firelighters
- Little Lucifer Firelighters
- Lux Pure Soap Flakes
- Martha Gardener Country Homestead Wool Mix
- Softly laundry care
- Sunlight bar soap and dishwashing liquid
- Velvet soap bar soap and dishwashing liquid
- White King household bleach
- Procell ANZ
- Bondi Beach Soap
- Duracell

Pental acquired the Bondi Beach soap brand in 2021.

On September 13, 2023, Pental's core brands, except for Duracell and Bondi Beach soap, were bought by the Dulux-Selleys Group.

In January 2025, it was announced that Pental had been acquired by the Dulux-Selleys Group. The remaining entity is now known as Prestal Holdings.

== See also ==
- Manufacturing in Australia
