= Balance of payments of Australia =

Australia's current account (in $Millions) since 1959.

The contribution of goods and services to Australia's current account (in $Millions) since 1959.

In trade terms, the Australian economy has had persistently large current account deficits for more than 50 years. One single factor that undermines balance of payments is Australia's narrow export base.

Dependent upon commodities, the Australian government has endeavoured to redevelop the Australian manufacturing sector. This initiative, also known as microeconomic reform, has helped Australian manufacturing to grow from 10.1% in 1983–1984 to 17.8% in 2003–2004.

There are other factors that have contributed to the extremely high current account deficit that Australia has today. Lack of international competitiveness and heavy reliance on capital goods from overseas might increase Australia's current account deficit in the future.

Low levels of national savings also contribute to high current account deficits. This is because excessive expenditure will force a lot of businesses to seek funds overseas. At the same time, when governments run constant budget deficits, they meet their monetary requirements by borrowing from the domestic sector. Economists refer to the 'crowding out effect' to explain this economic situation. When governments borrow from the domestic sector, they force the private sector to 'crowd out'.

Since there aren't enough funds available within the domestic economy, the private sector is forced to borrow funds from overseas. The borrowing of funds is simply typed into the borrowers account at interest to the lender and the fractional reserve banking system kicks in via computerised lendings. Borrowing from overseas causes Australia's current account deficit to increase, leading to a major increase in credit debt expansion. On the other hand, there is nothing wrong with the debt growing if gross domestic product grows at the same time. That is, current account deficit has to stay within a range of 4–5% in order to meet regular interest repayments on foreign debt whilst maintaining perpetual servitude of the borrower and interest repayments to the lender.

However, excessive current account deficit, combined with low investor confidence and the possibility of a currency crisis, may force the central bank to implement contractionary macroeconomic policies to restrict economic growth. When economic growth or activity is being restricted, low investment and low levels of expenditure will generally restrain the current account from growing. Nevertheless, Australia's current account deficit needs a long-term solution in order to secure the Australian economy's viability.

Many economists, notably John Pitchford, argued that choices whether to borrow or lend are dealt with between private or 'consenting adults' and in consequence no governmental intervention is necessary. There are also other experts who argue that Australia's high current account deficit will undermine the Australian dollar and that it might experience a similar crisis experienced by the Thai currency that foreshadowed major economic crisis.

== Effects on wider economy ==
There are multiple complications that result if countries have a high sustained current account deficit and high foreign debt. While sustainable foreign debt is not a major problem, an unsustainable current account deficit can have serious repercussions for the Australian economy. In December 2007, Australia's deficit hit $23.3 billion which was an 18 per cent increase from three months earlier.

== See also ==
- Ausbuy
- Balance of payments
- Economy of Australia
- Fractional Reserve Banking
- Products manufactured in Australia
