= Polish heroin =

Type of narcotic

"Polish" heroin (also kompot and compote in drug culture slang) is a crude preparation of heroin made from poppy straw. It is an opioid, used recreationally as a psychoactive drug. Poppy straw, like opium, is harvested from the opium poppy (Papaver somniferum). Polish heroin was used mainly in Central and Eastern Europe prior to the dissolution of the Soviet Union and the end of communist control of the countries of the Warsaw Pact or Eastern Bloc.

While related to opium, Polish heroin more nearly resembles poppy tea in its impurity, but can be very potent. This drug was also considered by Eastern Bloc addicts to be one of last resort when refined heroin, morphine, or other similar drugs were unavailable, as was often the case during the 1950s through the end of the Soviet era. Illicit drug trafficking and clandestine drug manufacture within the communist-governed nations of Poland, Hungary, Romania, Bulgaria, Russia itself, and others was on a much smaller scale and the supply far more erratic and unreliable compared to that of Western nations. Opium poppies, by contrast, were widely available and relatively inexpensive. The drug has been known as early as the 1940s. The drug in its finished state is a bitter brown fluid looking like tea or cola in color.

Polish heroin contains diacetylmorphine (heroin), 6-monoacetylmorphine (active metabolite of heroin), 3-monoacetylmorphine (less-active metabolite of heroin), morphine and small amounts of codeine. The amount of opiates can be high provided that the end product is not overly diluted during production, but the amount of diacetylmorphine and 6-monoacetylmorphine created depends on the skills of people making it and the time and conditions of acetylation.

The use of the term kompot or compote refers euphemistically to kompot, a traditional, non-alcoholic drink popular in Central and Eastern European countries made by boiling fruit and spices. The so-called kompot method of making a crude opiate "cocktail" intended for injection involves stewing the pods of the opium poppy in nearly boiling water and an acid, and using the strained liquid (essentially like kompot is produced from the raw ingredients). However, in 1976 two Polish students from Gdańsk discovered a simple way of making it by extracting opiate alkaloids from poppy straw by using ion-exchange resin, acetone, ammonia water and a few other chemicals used in the last step of production. In this method, opium poppy pods and stems are boiled in water for a few hours without adding acid, and then filtered. Strongly acidic ion-exchange resin is then added. The resin is filtered and the opiates are recovered with the addition of ammonia water. The resulting liquid is evaporated using a chemical condenser, then when dry (it is then called glazura - glaze) it is acetylated using acetic anhydride in an anhydrous environment of a non-polar solvent, for example toluene, diethyl ether, chloroform, or most commonly acetone.

After acetylation, the solvent is evaporated to remove the acetic anhydride, and finally water is added. The amount of water added depends on the amount of plant material used in the beginning of the process, most often 30 milliliters per kilogram of dry plant material. Although the drug is primarily intended for intravenous injection, kompot extraction as described here produces an end product containing residual plant matter, waste chemicals, impure water, and other contaminants, making this a dangerous substance to inject since such impurities can lead to abscesses or anaphylactic shock.

Use of Polish heroin has been in decline since the break-up of the Soviet Union and its Central and Eastern European satellite states (Hungary, Poland, Czechoslovakia, Romania, et al.) as after 1991 the availability of heroin and other drugs smuggled into those countries from abroad increased enormously. Since then, in Poland "kompot"/"Polish heroin" has all but disappeared, except in a few rural areas where cheaper, purer, more potent drugs have not overwhelmed the illicit marketplace.

In Belarus, compote is the most popular psychoactive substance among people on the list of narcological supervision in health care facilities. In 1998 they constituted 75.8% of registered persons, and in 2012 - 53%, and their number increased 2.5 times in the years 1998–2012.
