= Poppy juice =

Poppy juice may refer to:

- Opium, latex of the opium poppy
- Poppy tea, a water extraction of dried opium poppy seeds, fruits, or straw
