= Bellroy =

Accessories brand from Australia

- Type: Private
- Industry: retail
- Founded: 2009; 17 years ago Melbourne, Victoria, Australia
- Founder: Andrew Fallshaw; Lina Calabria; Matthew Fallshaw; Hadrien Monloup
- Headquarters: Melbourne, Victoria, Australia
- Key people: Andrew Fallshaw, co-founder; Lina Calabria, co-founder (CEO); Matthew Fallshaw, co-founder
- Products: Bags, wallets, phone cases, pouches, folios, key covers
- Website: bellroy.com

Bellroy is an Australian accessories brand making carry goods, including bags, folios, wallets, pouches, mobile phone cases, and key covers. It is a certified B Corporation.

Bellroy is an official supplier to Apple Inc.

== History ==
Bellroy was founded in 2009 by designers Andrew Fallshaw and Hadrien Monloup, and engineers Lina Calabria and Matthew Fallshaw. Its first products to market were slim wallets. The name Bellroy is derived from the towns of Bells Beach and Fitzroy, where the company has offices. The brand launched its first wallets in August 2010.

In April 2019, Bellroy announced a partnership with Silas Capital, a New York-based growth equity firm that invests in consumer brands. Later that year, the company was valued at $83 million. In 2021, Bellroy was voted Australia's best small business workplace. As of 2023, Bellroy has over 100 employees.

== See also ==
- Fashion accessory
- Personal accessory retailer
