= Ausbuy =

Australian non-profit organization

- Type: Non-profit
- Industry: Local purchase alliance
- Founder: Harry Wallace
- Headquarters: Australia
- Parent: Australian Made Campaign Limited

The Australian Companies Institute (Ausbuy) was, until 2016, a non-profit, non-political organisation that encouraged Australians to support Australian-owned and Australian-made products and services. Their goal was to keep the jobs and profits in Australia and for the decisions to be made by Australians.

Due to a downturn in membership renewals and increased costs, the company went into voluntary administration and was wound-up in 2016. The ownership of the Ausbuy logos, business name and trademarks were transferred to the Australian Made Campaign Ltd.

== Background ==
After World War II Australia faced the problem of having an underdeveloped manufacturing base, which left it dependent on overseas supplies. There was a realisation that this situation, combined with Australia's geographic isolation, made it vulnerable. This led to the decision being made to build up manufacturing capability. The aftermath of war provided opportunities to recruit skilled workers from Europe and Australia was able to establish capacity behind the protection of a tariff wall. It became obvious that this wall had to be reduced but the rate of reduction ran well ahead of Australia's increasing ability to compete in a global market.

=== Effects of economic reform and tariff reduction ===
Australia adopted policies of economic liberalisation and micro-economic reform in the early 1980s, including the privatisation of government corporations, deregulation of factor markets, floating of the Australian dollar, and the reduction of trade protection. Justifications for reducing trade tariffs included the portrayal of Australia as a good global citizen and, at the same time, reducing inflationary pressures. The costs have been high: Australia's foreign debt has risen extremely quickly, factories have closed and well-paid skilled jobs in factories have been replaced by unskilled jobs in the service industries.

Australia has effectively exported jobs overseas and its foreign debt exceeds A$600 billion and is growing. Australia simply does not produce more than it uses. The country has been living on borrowed time, and Australians have stopped talking about productivity and value adding. For example, Australia exports raw materials and its unique fine wool, but then imports them back at a higher value. Free trade agreements have been signed by Australia, which further expose what manufacturers it has left, and then Australian governments bolster strategic industries to save jobs.

Australia is recognised as an innovative and productive country, and it needs local governments and consumers to appreciate and support what is unique to this country. The international trend of globalisation has been matched domestically with the rise of the megastore concept of retailing. Large supermarkets as well as warehouses have their selling policies based on anytime, everywhere, everything the same, which means their procurement policies are centrally driven; they demand bulk orders from specific price competitive producers and farmers.

=== Buy Australian campaigns ===
In its magazine Choice of January 1987 the Australian Consumers' Association advised consumers to Buy Australian when the quality was equal and the price comparable to imported products. Nevertheless, it is notable given that Choice is well regarded as an impartial source of information for Australian consumers, but the Australian Consumers' Association refused to make a commitment to favour an Australian product over a better product from overseas.

This could be classified as a typical means of moral suasion, which can be seen as benevolent compulsion, or making others conform without enforcing rules directly. It is also termed simply suasion (in Japan it is known as window guidance) which has been used to persuade consumers and institutions to keep to official guidelines. The moral aspect stems from pressing on the targets of the suasion their moral responsibility to operate in a way that is consistent with furthering the national good. In the United States it is known as jawboning – it means exercising the persuasive power of talk rather than legislation.

In countries experiencing economic decline, especially those with a high unemployment level and trade deficit, consumers are urged to buy locally made products to help create jobs, assist in defeating unemployment and to avoid import penetration. Sometimes it is a so-called war against unemployment where policy makers like to raise an appeal to patriotic behaviour, shifting the responsibility of employment and the level of high import penetration towards consumers. Ultimately a successful moral suasion campaign which reduces import penetration significantly can be seen as a tax on imports with the potential to increase unemployment in the import sector as a result of decreasing demand for imports.

The lower supply of the Australian dollar may cause it to be of higher value in the foreign exchange markets, which obviously leads to a tax on exports, or consequently employment of Australians by Australian manufacturers producing goods for overseas markets will reduce. Furthermore, given that consumers are shifting their demand for consumer goods to domestic products, it still remains a dilemma whether the retailers and manufacturers of domestic products invest in Australian business operations. Or in other words, which authority controls that the profits remain in Australia?

== History of Ausbuy ==
Ausbuy was founded in 1991 by Harry Wallace as a result of his family business of 120 years being lost to foreign imports deposited in Australia to gain market share. His company was only one example of this, as an increasing number of companies in Australia had been forced to sell out to foreign interests, and foreign governments subsidised their producers to sell cheaply into the Australian market in competition with Australian-owned companies who do not enjoy that level of government support.

By 2007, Ausbuy had approximately 100 members, producing more than 3000 products across 150 categories. During the 2009 Truth in Labelling Senate Inquiry, Ausbuy was the only large representative organisation that asked for Country of Origin to be required on labelling used by food producers, manufacturers and distributors.

Ausbuy presented a petition of over 55,000 signatures to the Federal Government in November 2012 asking for a moratorium on the sale of Australian land and wealth-creating assets until the establishment a national interest test.

On 26 May 2016, the board of directors decided to undertake voluntary winding up of the company. As a result of a number of factors including changes to country of origin labelling, downturn in membership renewals, increased one off costs associated with company structure, compliance and technology, Ausbuy was no longer able to continue as a going concern. Despite a wide range of activities and strategies designed to retain and grow membership over the previous 18 months, the organisation had continued its decline to a point where a voluntary winding up of the company was the only prudent option.

== See also ==
- Products manufactured in Australia
- Australian made (1986–present)
- Australia Made Preference League (1920s)
