= Calcium morphenate =

Chemical structure of a component of the calcium morphenate mixture

Calcium morphenate is a calcium salt of morphine which is produced by using calcium bases to raise the pH of an aqueous solution of opium alkaloids to around 9.0. This was a method used in pharmaceutical manufacturing to separate morphine from other alkaloids and inert materials from the opium solution. Variations on this route are still used in Afghanistan. When poppy straw concentrate or opium latex is dissolved in hot water and the calcium base is added, calcium morphenate is formed. Treatment with a weak acid such as ammonium chloride then causes morphine freebase to precipitate, leaving codeine and other alkaloids of the plant in solution.

Manufacture of heroin from morphine
