= Selleys =

Australian DIY product company

Selleys is an Australian company which produces household do it yourself and cleaning products, as well as a wide range of adhesives and sealants for both the DIY and trade market.

== History ==
Martin Selley established the Selleys Chemical Company after he left Germany for Australia in 1939, and sold wood putty.

Selleys is now a subsidiary of Dulux.

== Products ==
Products produced by Selleys include:

- Alu-Mesh
- Ezy-Glide
- Flash-Wax
- No More Gaps
  - Brown
- Spakfilla
- Sugar Soap

== See also ==
- List of companies named after people
- Manufacturing in Australia
