= Riviera Australia =

Luxury yacht company

- Type: Private
- Industry: Boat Builders / Manufacturing
- Founders: Bill Barry-Cotter
- Headquarters: Gold Coast, Queensland
- Area served: Worldwide
- Owner: Rodney Longhurst
- Number of employees: 950

Riviera Australia is an Australian luxury motor yacht builder based on the Gold Coast in the state of Queensland.

== History ==
Riviera was established in Terrey Hills in 1980 by Bill Barry-Cotter. In 1981, the company relocated to the Gold Coast, Queensland, where the business established its long-term base. Riviera began exporting boats in 1983, with the first shipment made to the US that year. In October 2002, Barry-Cotter sold Riviera to Singapore's GIC Special Investments and Gresham Private Equity.

Riviera was placed into voluntary receivership in May 2009, after the 2008 financial crisis, and the company was restructured.

In 2012, Riviera was purchased by Gold Coast businessman Rodney Longhurst and his private company Longhurst Marine Holdings Pty Ltd. The Longhurst family previously had extensive boatbuilding interests in Sydney. Riviera then underwent a corporate restructure and recapitalisation of the business.

Exports currently account for approximately 60 per cent of Riviera's total production output. The US and New Zealand remain Riviera's largest international markets.

The company embarked on the first stage of a $10 million capital works program in 2020.
