= Nippy's =

Australian drink manufacturer

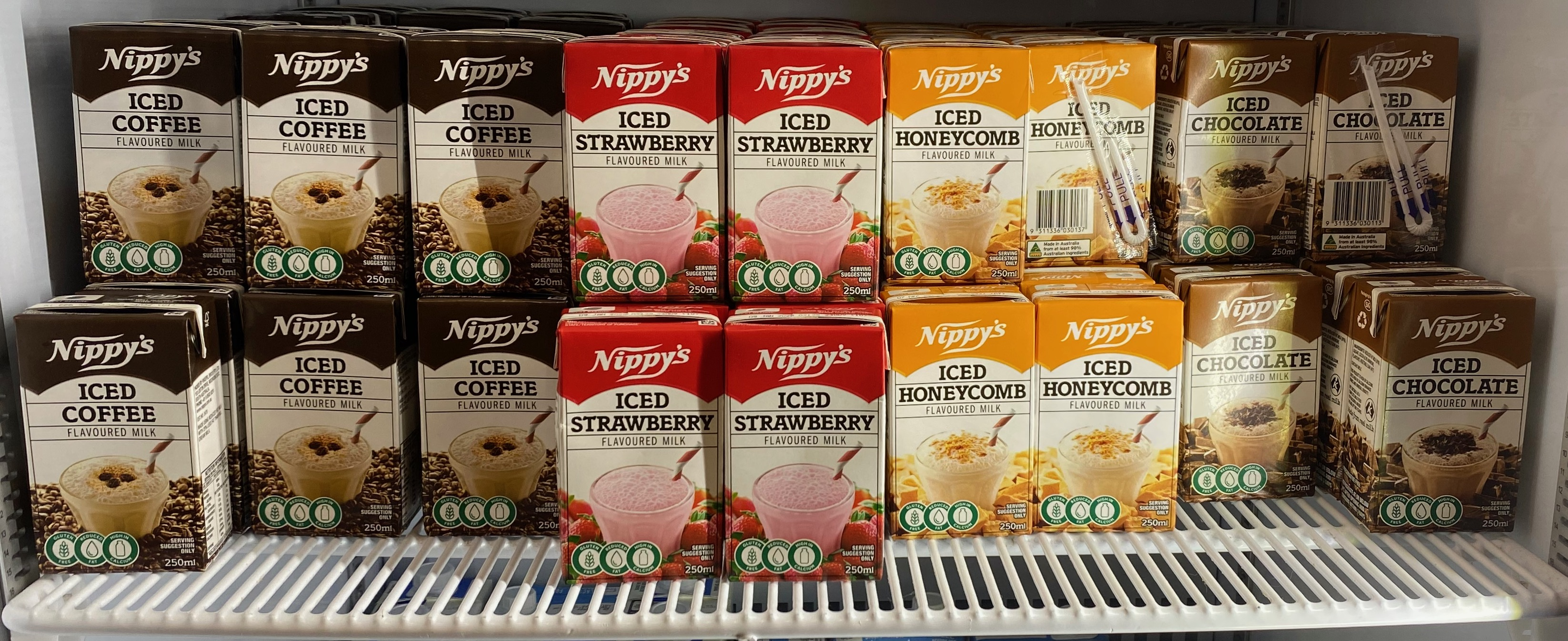
- A range of Nippy's flavoured milks
- Industry: Beverages
- Founded: c. 1965
- Headquarters: Regency Park, South Australia, Australia
- Website: nippys.com.au

Nippy's is a drink manufacturer in South Australia. The company is 100% owned by a South Australian family with all of its products being made in Australia. The company produces Fruit Juices, Flavoured Milks and UHT Milk.

Following a salmonella outbreak in 1999, the company was awarded A$3 million in damages after they were supplied with infected oranges.

In 2011, the company commenced only using Australian grown oranges in its products for the first time since 2006.

In 2016, the company announced it intended to expand its operations in the Riverland region. The A$$967,000 expansion was made possible with a A$400,000 grant from the Federal government.

The company completed an A$10 million plant in 2017 to produce 500 ml (18 imp fl oz; 17 US fl oz) flavoured milk bottles in addition to the existing range of 375 ml (13.2 imp fl oz; 12.7 US fl oz) flavoured milk boxes.

In 2021, the company announced they intended to remove voluntary health rating logos from their products after the fruit juice range rating changed from 5 stars to two stars following a review by the Australian and New Zealand Ministerial Forum on Food Regulation.

== See also ==
- List of South Australian manufacturing businesses
- South Australian food and drink
