= Poppy straw =

Portion of opium poppy

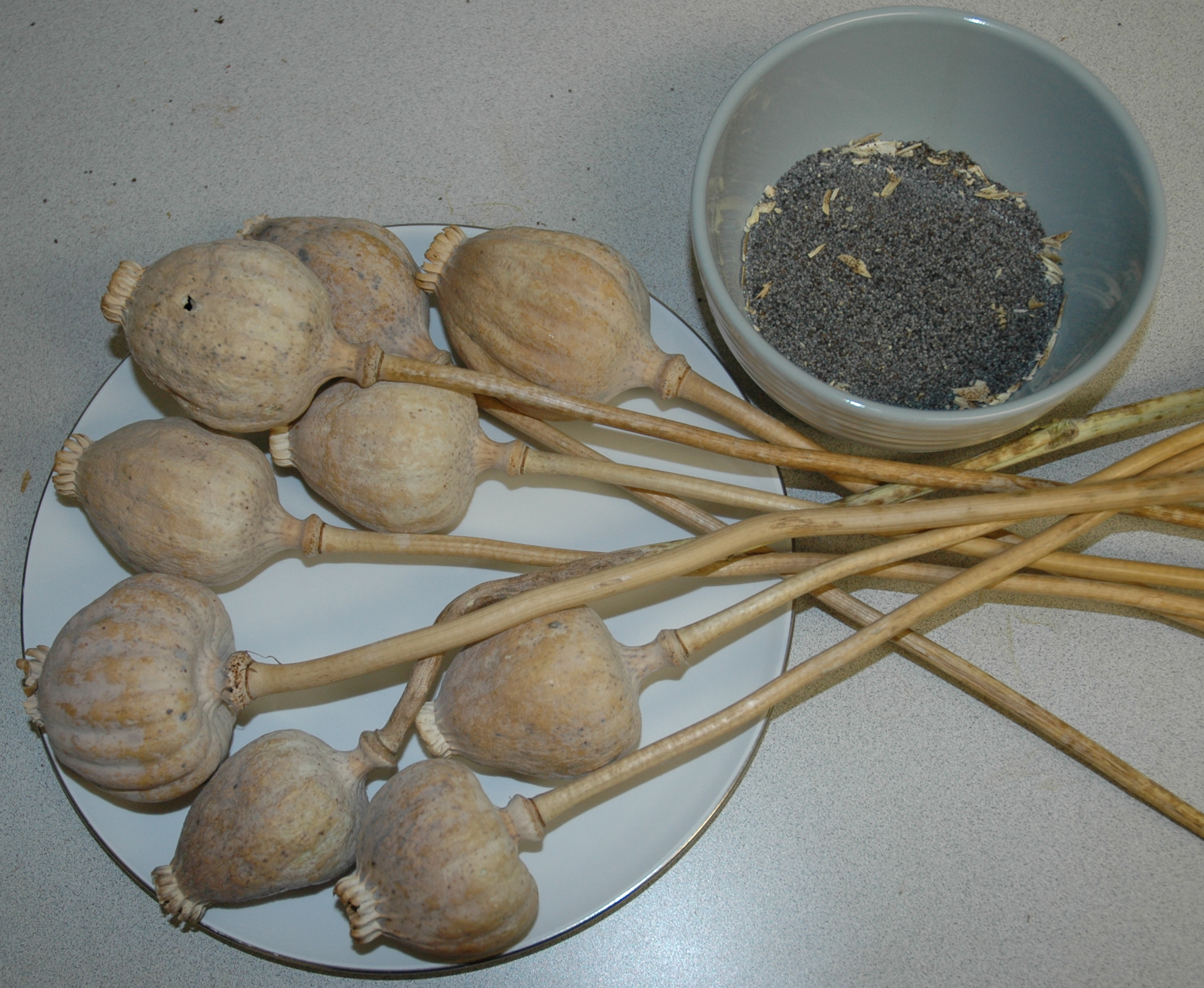
Poppy straw (left) and seeds (right)

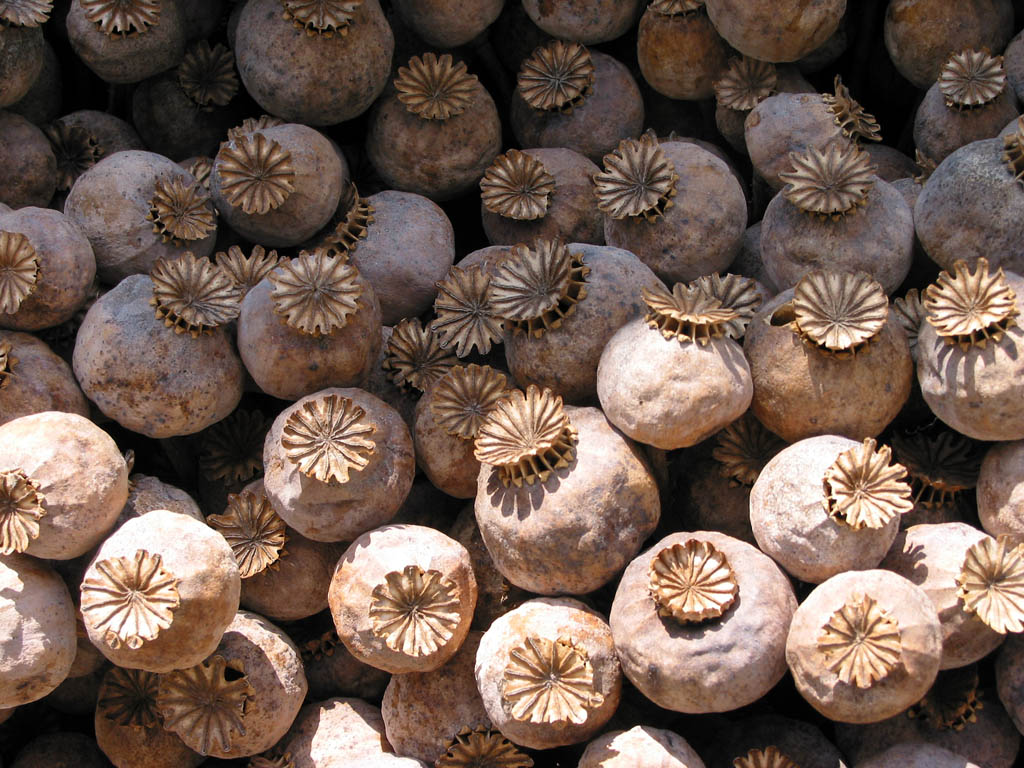
Poppy seed heads, pods or capsules

Poppy straw (also known as opium straw, mowed opium straw, crushed poppy capsule, poppy chaff, or poppy husk) is derived from opium poppies (Papaver somniferum) that are harvested when fully mature and dried by mechanical means. Opium poppy straw is what remains after the seed pods have been harvested — that is, the dried stalks, stem and leaves of poppies grown for their seeds. The field-dried leaves, stalk, and seed pod are then used in commercial manufacture of morphine or other poppy-alkaloid derived drugs, by first processing the material, separating the seeds, and then making concentrate of poppy straw where no extraction using the traditional methods of latex extraction has been made. The straw was originally considered an agricultural by-product of the mechanised poppy seed harvest, which was primarily grown for its edible and oil-producing seed. This changed in 1927 when János Kabay developed a chemical process to extract morphine from the crushed capsule. Concentrated poppy straw, consisting mainly of the crushed capsule without the seeds, soon became a valuable source of morphine. Today, concentrate of poppy straw is a major source of many opiates and other alkaloids. It is the source of 90% of the world supply of legal morphine (for medical and scientific use) and in some countries it also is a source of illegal morphine, which could be processed into illegal heroin.

The 1961 Single Convention on Narcotic Drugs defines poppy straw as "all parts (except the seeds) of the opium poppy, after mowing".

Decorative dried flower producer/growers and wholesalers hand-pick the decorative mature seeded pods/heads with or without the stalks for use in floral decorative arrangements. These are then mechanically dried at high temperatures in large kilns to render insects dead and the seeds unviable, so that the harvest consists almost entirely of the dried flowered seeded pods/heads (for ease of transport, artificial stems are added afterwards, e.g. bird seed wreath making, floral arrangements and wedding boutonnières or arts/craft projects). The seeds used for this market are chosen for the size and shape of the mature poppy seed pod/head and not alkaloid content.

Many varieties, strains, and cultivars of Papaver somniferum are in existence, and the alkaloid content can vary significantly.

== Harvesting ==
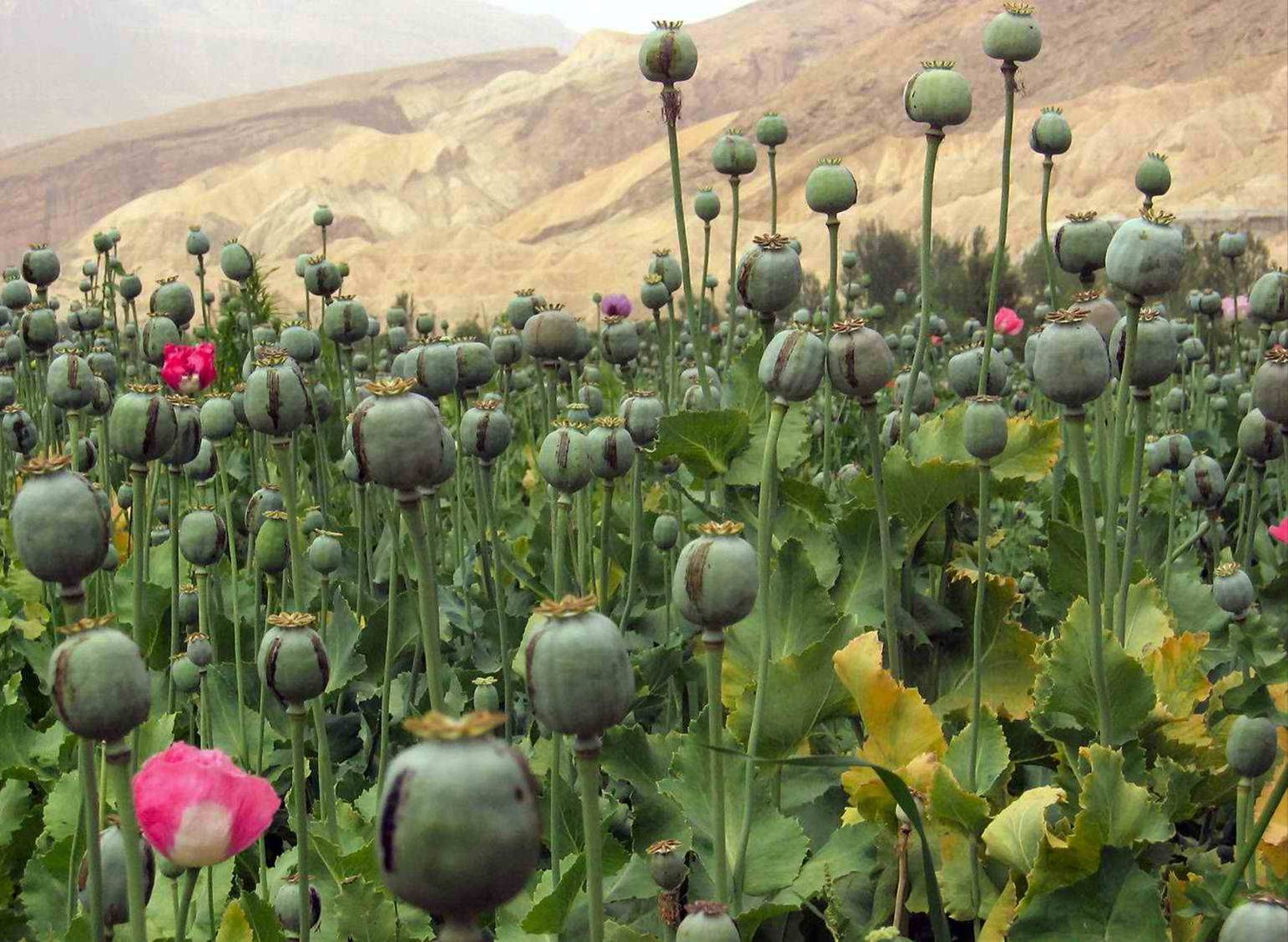
Traditional method: fruits are scored

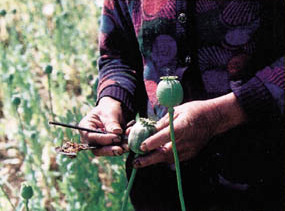
Traditional method of harvesting opium by hand, still in use today

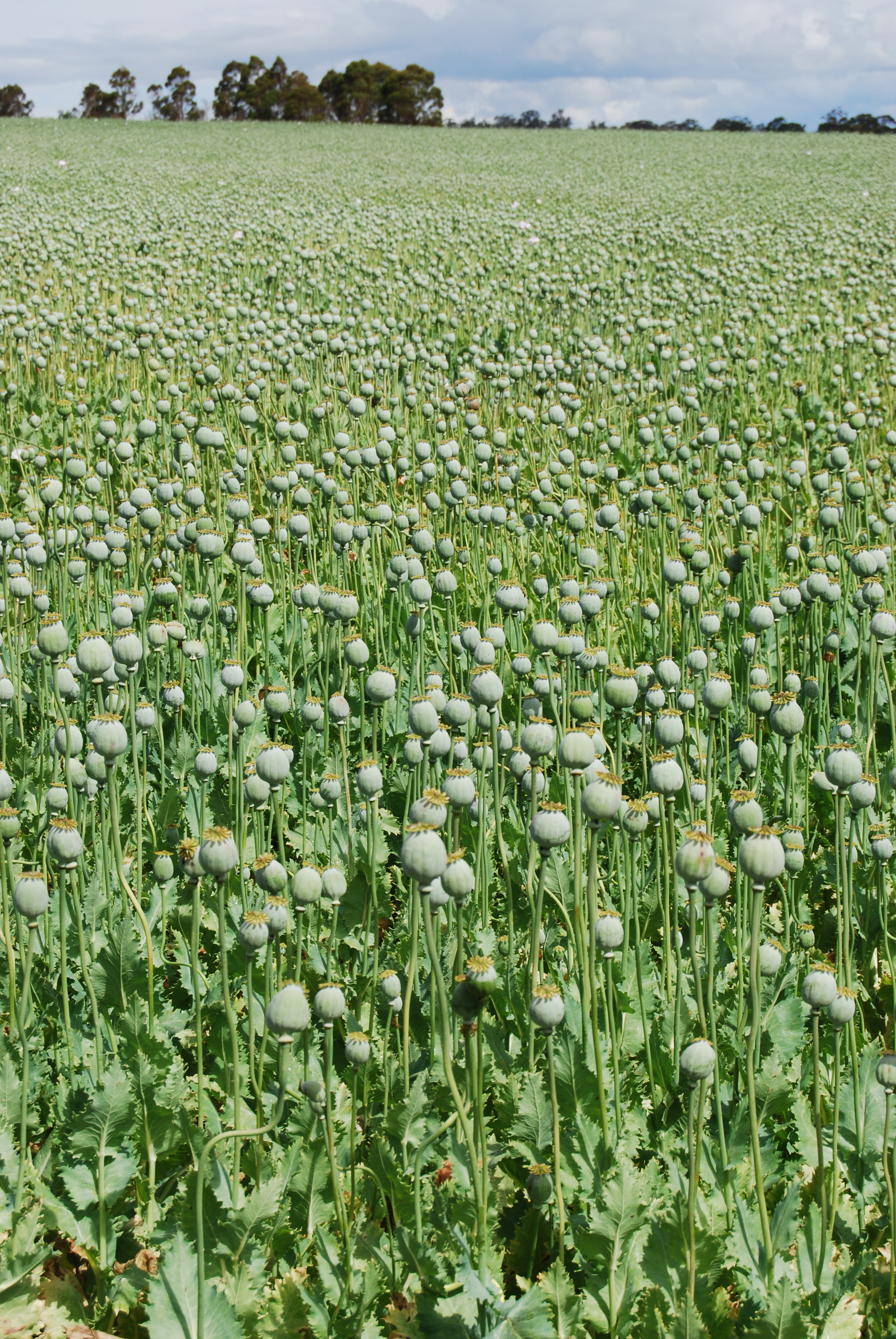
Modern method; fruits are not scored

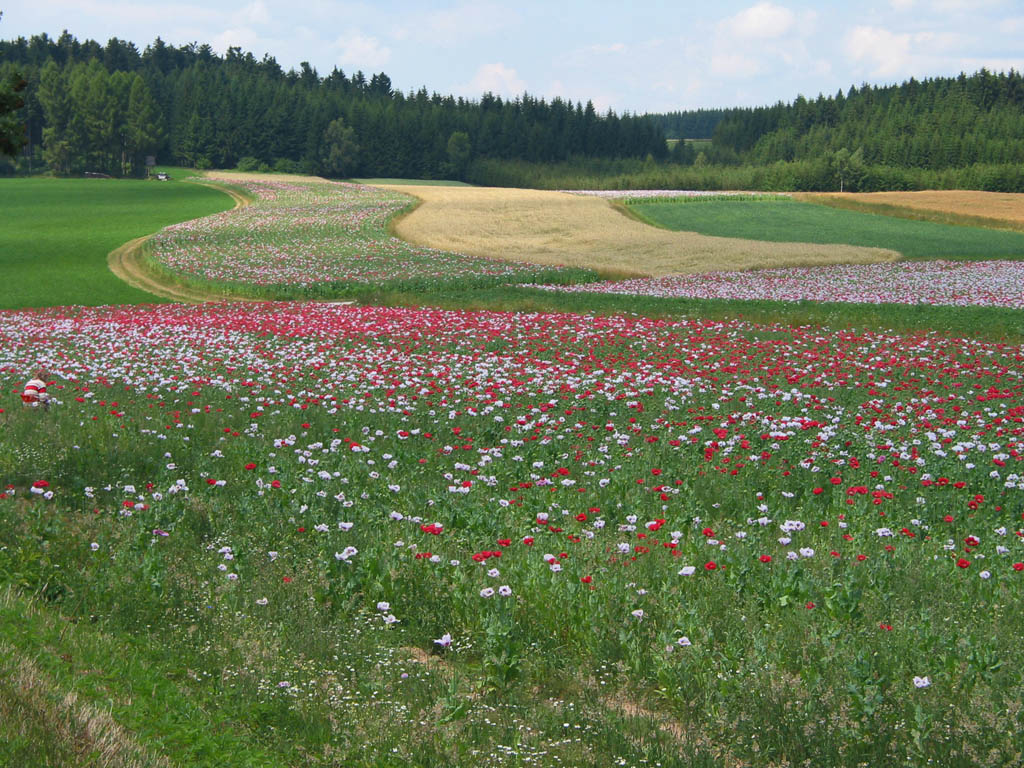
Modern method: harvesting of poppy straw

Traditional harvesting of opium poppies to produce opiates involved the labor-intensive work of making shallow cuts in the immature fruits (seed pods) so that the latex would leak out and dry, then returning the following day to scrape off the dry latex, known as raw opium.

Harvesting of poppy straw is an alternative, largely mechanized, method. The plants are allowed to mature fully, then a machine is used to harvest the entire field. The ripe poppy seeds are separated out by threshing and winnowing, and the remainder is poppy straw. Poppy straw usually consists of only the above ground parts of the plant, but the roots may be harvested as well. Some producers mow the plants high, so that the harvest consists almost entirely of the fruits (seed pods), omitting the stalks, leaves, and roots. Poppy straw is then processed in a manner similar to opium to extract opiates and other alkaloids.

Avoiding the labor-intensive harvesting of opium by hand was the topic of research for almost 100 years. This research was of notable interest in those countries where opium poppy was an important oilseed crop but where high labor costs made the harvesting of opium uneconomic. What was needed was a process that enabled commercial extraction of opiates from opium poppies directly rather than from (comparatively pure) opium.

By the 1940s, commercial production of morphine from poppy straw had spread from Hungary to Poland and finally to most countries where poppies are grown on a large scale primarily for their seeds. By 1950, about 10% of the poppy seed harvest of those countries was also yielding morphine. Based on average yields and the reported production of poppy seed in nine European countries, the potential production of morphine from those crops was estimated to be 148,800 kilograms (328,000 lb). However, in 1950 the actual production of morphine from poppy straw was reported to be 11,663 kilograms (25,713 lb).

As of 1950, the average annual yield per hectare was estimated to be 675 kilograms (1,488 lb) poppy seed and 450 kilograms (990 lb) poppy straw (dry capsule chaff), which in turn was estimated to yield about 1.5 kilograms (3.3 lb) of morphine (in good years).

== Processing ==
The first commercial process by which opiates are extracted from poppy straw was invented in Hungary by János Kabay. This process, known as the "poppy straw method", remains in use today. Kabay applied his new process initially to fields of opium poppies between the stages of flowering and maturity, while the fruits were green. This had several disadvantages: the immature poppy seeds could not be winnowed, so not only was the seed crop lost but their poppyseed oil interfered with the process; the abundant chlorophyll in the green plants also interfered; and an entire year's crop had to be processed in two months, as it reached the fruit stage. Kabay soon found that the process could be applied to poppy straw residue from the poppy seed harvest, thereby eliminating all these disadvantages.

Poppy straw is first pulverized, then washed as many as six to ten or more times in water which may have an acid added to increase solubility, to produce poppy straw concentrate (PSC, also known as concentrate of poppy straw, CPS). Dried, the concentrate is a beige to brown powder. It contains salts of various alkaloids, and can range from nine to 30 times the morphine concentration of poppy straw. Opium concentrates using solvents other than acidifed or plain water are often but not necessarily called PSC.

Poppies of the Norman and Przemko strains contain much higher amounts of thebaine (also known as paramorphine) and oripavine and have morphine concentrations from as low as below 1% up to 26% that of high-morphine strains. At least one manufacturer, Tasmanian Alkaloids, produces both high-morphine and high-thebaine/oripavine types of poppy straw concentrate; the latter is used by pharmaceutical manufacturers to make semi-synthetic and synthetic opioids such as hydrocodone, hydromorphone, oxycodone, oxymorphone, nalbuphine, naloxone, naltrexone, buprenorphine, butorphanol and etorphine.

PSC is an alternative to bricks of opium as an alkaloid source in most but not all of the production methods that isolate alkaloids from the opium poppy. A notable exception is thebaine, which is present in far larger fractions in opium than in poppy straw. Morphine, being a large fraction of the alkaloids found in mature poppy capsules, is produced commercially from either opium or concentrated poppy straw. To extract morphine, PSC is dissolved in water and treated with other chemicals to obtain the next intermediate, calcium morphenate (or less frequently sodium morphenate), which is then further treated to purify the drug and convert it to the desired morphine salt or base. Processes for extracting other alkaloids, such as codeine and noscapine, use other pharmaceutical processes.

== Poppy straw crops ==
Annual world production of opium and poppy straw, both legal and illegal, is tabulated by the United Nations Office on Drugs and Crime, and reported in its annual World Drug Report. The quantity of poppy straw produced is typically given as "opium equivalents". The 2002 World Drug Report estimate of the total world opium production, including opium equivalents of poppy straw, was 42,600 metric tons (41,900 long tons) in 1906/07 and 12,600 metric tons (12,400 long tons) in 2007. The 2007 production consisted of 8,870 metric tons (8,730 long tons) of illegal opium, 3,420 metric tons (3,370 long tons) of opium equivalent from legal poppy straw, and 300 metric tons (300 long tons) of legal opium. Thus, over 90% of the world production of legal opiates, including medical morphine, is now produced from poppy straw.

With the establishment of poppy straw as the source of the majority of natural morphine and other opiates, much of the world production of opium is destined for illicit uses. In 1981 dried capsules being sold for decoration in Sweden were found to have been lanced 2 – 5 times with a tool having 3 to 4 blades and the opium scraped off. The morphine content of these capsules was 0.15 – 0.34%, comparable to domestic Swedish capsules not lanced. In India, poppy straw from lanced capsules had a morphine content of at least 0.2%. These levels of morphine obtained from "exhausted" plants suggests that for producers of licit opium, poppy straw may be a profitable second crop.

As of 2005, India was the only country producing licit opium (opium gum) for both domestic use and export. Licit opium was produced also in Democratic People's Republic of Korea for domestic use, and in Japan for maintenance of the pertinent technology (small quantities). Opium poppies were grown principally for extraction of alkaloids (from poppy straw) in nine other countries: Australia, China, France, Hungary, Slovakia, Spain, the Republic of Macedonia, Turkey, and the United Kingdom. China ceased producing licit opium after 2001. Opium poppies grown principally for the seed crop, with licit poppy straw as a by-product, were produced in the Czech Republic, Serbia and Montenegro. Another six countries cultivated opium poppies solely for the poppy seed or horticultural purposes, without extraction of alkaloids from poppy straw: Austria, Estonia, Germany, Netherlands, Poland, and Ukraine. Illicit production of Polish heroin and other products derived from poppy straw is an ongoing problem in Poland, although it isn't as serious as in the 1980s, after poppies containing high levels of opioid alkaloids were banned in 1990s.

The production of licit opium in India was in accord with terms of the 1961 Single Convention on Narcotic Drugs. After the opium was harvested, the plants were allowed to mature and harvested for poppy seeds. The sale of poppy seeds delivered a significant proportion of the income from the licit opium crop. Unknown fractions of both the opium harvest and the poppy straw residue from the poppy seed harvest were diverted to illicit uses.

The production of illegal opium from poppy straw is limited. It is reported primarily in clandestine laboratories in Moldova, the Russian Federation, and Ukraine, using domestic poppy straw.

== Derived products ==
A common method of producing laudanum involves dissolving the PSC or latex-derived opium in alcohol and either allowing the solution to sit for up to a week, being periodically agitated; using fresh alcohol to do multiple washes; or refluxing. The original patents for laudanum in various countries refer to soaking poppy straw with varying levels of pulverisation in plain water for a week then evaporating the water to obtain the gummy or powdery brown concentrate.

== Recreational use ==
Poppy tea and its variants can be said to be an incomplete and/or relatively crude form of PSC aqueous solution.

Home-made poppy straw extracts including Kompot are widely used among IV drug users in eastern Europe, including Ukraine and Poland.

== Tracing of illicit drugs ==
Illegal heroin may be produced using poppy straw as a raw material. The alkaloid profiles of poppy straw and opium are similar, but preliminary research suggests they can be distinguished by relative quantities of alkaloids. Based on the presence of the alkaloid oripavine in some opium poppies, it has been suggested that illegal heroin seized in Australia was produced from a legal poppy straw crop stolen in Tasmania a few years earlier.
