= Sutton Tools =

Australian company

- Industry: automotive engineering
- Headquarters: Maryborough, Victoria, Australia

Sutton Tools, often styled Sutton, is an Australian company known for manufacturing hand tools for the automotive and engineering trades.
