= Personal accessory retailer =

Type of retail business

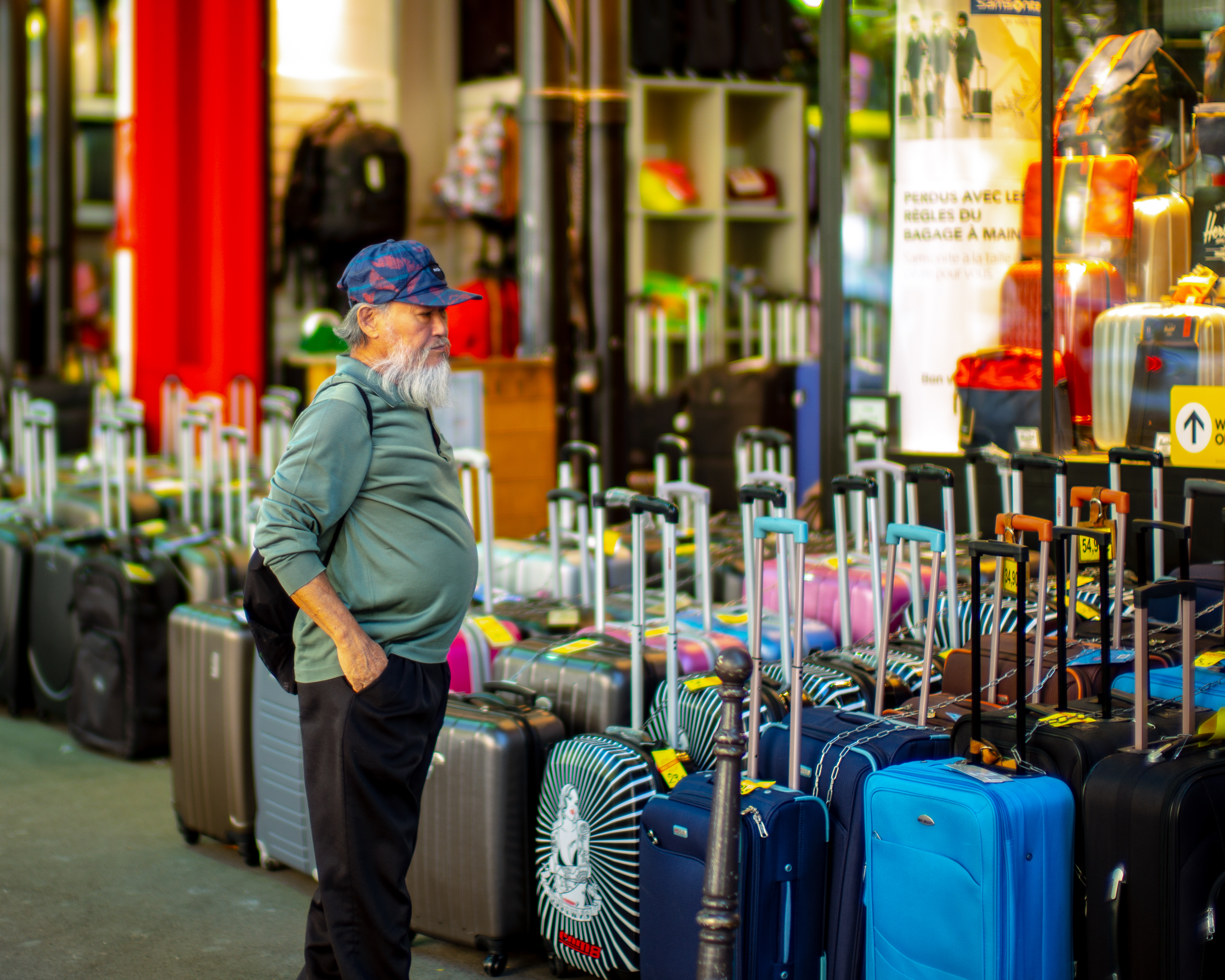
Luggage retailer

A personal accessory retailer is a retail businesses that predominantly sells personal accessories. A luggage retailer or bag store may sell handbags, wallets, briefcases, sports bags, travel baggage, and travel-related products. Other retailers may specialise in wigs, umbrellas, sunglasses, jewellery, and leather goods.

The increase in the demand for baggage is directly proportional to the rapid growth of tourism, particularly by the growing international middle class and baby boomer population. China, the United States, South Korea, Brazil, the Netherlands, Spain, Germany, and the United Kingdom all have large markets of outbound tourists. While the North American region has the largest luggage sector, the Asia-Pacific region has the fastest-growing sector and some Asian countries, like India, have particularly competitive luggage markets.

The increase in demand for handbags has been the result of a rising women workforce, particularly in developing countries, and increased brand awareness, particularly in developed countries. Europe makes up about 35% of the global market, but China, India, South Korea and Indonesia are key growth markets.

== History ==
The COVID-19 pandemic led to a sharp decline in sales of luggage and personal accessories, due to travel restrictions, social distancing rules and reduced disposable income. The value of the global luggage market dropped from $22 billion in 2019 to $16 billion in 2020.

The sector only recorded modest growth in many countries in 2021.

However, the sector is expected to recover. The global luggage market is expected to average 8.6% annual growth between 2021 and 2025. The global handbag market is expected to average 6.7% annual growth, from US$49.63 billion in 2021 to US$78.46 billion in 2028.

== See also ==
- Clothing retailer
- Eyewear retailer
