= Australia Made Preference League =

Organisation promoting Australian-made products

Australia Made Preference League was the organisation behind the Great White Train that travelled through New South Wales in Australia, in the 1920s.

The league was formed in 1924 to promote Australian made goods over imported goods. Wallace Nelson was a co-founder

The Queensland branch of the league was started in 1924 in response to the success of the New South Wales organisation

The materials published and produced by the League have become collectors pieces.
