= Poppy tea =

Herbal tea made out of poppy straw or poppy seeds

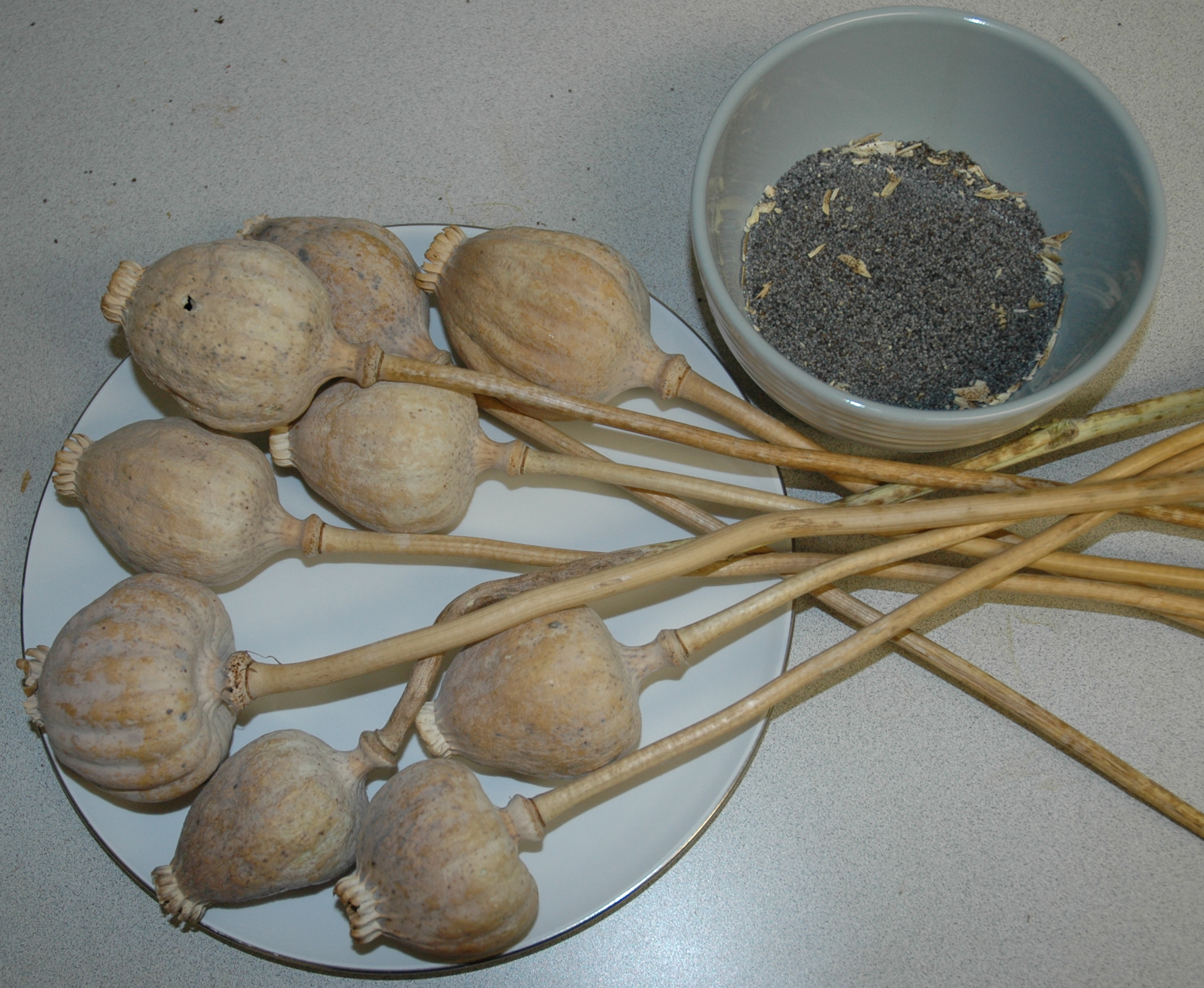
Dried poppy seed pods and stems (plate), and seeds (bowl). It belongs to the plant family Papaveraceae (common name poppy) the genus Papaver has two species containing morphine, codeine, thebaine, noscapine (also called narcotine), and papaverine.

Poppy tea is a herbal tea infusion brewed from poppy straw or seeds of several species of poppy. The species most commonly used for this purpose is Papaver somniferum, which produces opium as a natural defense against predators. In the live flower, opium is released when the surface of the bulb, called the seed pod, is pierced or scraped. For the purpose of the tea, dried pods are more commonly used than the pods of the live flower. The walls of the dried pods contain opiate alkaloids, primarily consisting of morphine and codeine.

The tea is consumed for its narcotic effect, and in small amounts for analgesic, anti-diarrheal, and sedative effects. It has also been known to be used as a method of relieving withdrawal symptoms. Use of such preparations originated in parts of Central and Eastern Europe, the Levant and Near East, and Central and South Central Asia millennia ago.

The flowers of the poppy plant have long been used as a painkiller for soothing mild aches and pains (e.g. toothache, earache and sore throat), a mild sedative/relaxant, an expectorant for treating catarrh and coughs, as a digestive, and even for reducing the appearance of wrinkles and in lipsticks.

This tea is depicted both in Asian literature, Western literature, and is depicted as being available in opium dens.

== Legality ==
=== Netherlands ===
In the Netherlands, all parts of Papaver somniferum after harvesting (except for the seeds) are illegal by law, as they are Listed as drugs in the Opium Law. Because of use for decorative purposes, the trade in, and possession of dried Papaver somniferum is not actively prosecuted. Trade in, or possession of dried Papaver somniferum with the intention of drug use can be prosecuted. The dried seed pod of Papaver somniferum is easily obtainable as it is commonly available for decorative use. Many varieties, strains, and cultivars of Papaver somniferum are in existence, and the alkaloid content can vary significantly.

=== United States ===
In the United States it is legal to purchase poppy seeds, but all other parts of the plant are considered Schedule II controlled substances under the federal Controlled Substances Act of 1970. Unwashed poppy seeds can potentially contain lethal concentrations of morphine but only in excessively large quantities (e.g. multiple pounds of seeds). The Opium Poppy Exclusion Act of 1942 bans growing the poppy in many cases but is generally not a problem for gardeners as the plant is widely grown for the flowers, and for seeds for replanting and cooking. For much of US history poppies were a significant cash crop, and the government encouraged farmers to grow more poppies for medicinal use during wars up to World War I. It is, however, manufacture of a schedule II substance to create a drink for the opium content, and the possession of it is illegal as well.

=== Canada ===
The import and sale of opium poppy seeds is legal in Canada, but possession of other parts of the plant may be prosecuted. Canadian authorities have noted the presence of dode or doda in the South Asian community, a traditional form of poppy tea. Crackdowns on this traditional preparation in the late 2000s led to a number of arrests in Canada.

== Chemical composition ==
Poppy tea contains two groups of alkaloids: phenanthrenes (including morphine and codeine) and benzylisoquinolines (including papaverine). Of these, morphine is the most prevalent comprising 8%–14% of the total. Its effects derive from the fact that it binds to and activates mu opioid receptors in the brain, spinal cord, stomach and intestine.

Dried Papaver somniferum capsules and stems will, if harvested and dried by the usual protocol, contain significantly lower quantities of thebaine than opium made from latex as well as somewhat more codeine. When ingested, thebaine causes nausea, vomiting, and myoclonus. Thebaine is an important precursor for manufacture of pharmaceuticals, and is more concentrated in the roots of Papaver somniferum than elsewhere. Other species of poppies, numbering in the hundreds, do not contain morphine or codeine in useful amounts, but may contain non-narcotic alkaloids like protopine, sanguinarine or berberine.

== Side effects and tolerance ==
Side effects increase with dosage, and include drowsiness, mild stomach ache, lethargy, urinary retention, bradypnea, constipation, nausea, respiratory depression, and death. Nausea can be attributed to the presence of noscapine. At high doses, the side effects are dangerous and can cause death through hypoventilation or pulmonary aspiration of vomit.

Symptoms of withdrawal include diarrhea, vomiting, sweating, anxiety, rhinorrhea, agitation, seizures.

== Deaths ==
In the United States, in 2003, a 17-year-old who, according to his parents, was self-treating his anxiety with home-brewed poppy seed tea, died of pulmonary edema caused by acute morphine and codeine intoxication. A Drug Alert posted by the DOJ in 2010 pointed to five deaths possibly resulting from drinking of poppy tea. Since 2010, not less than 10 deaths presumably related to poppy tea consumption were reported by the FDA's Center for Food Safety and Applied Nutrition Adverse Event Reporting System (CAERS).

In Canada, on 19 May 2012, a 19-year-old from Nova Scotia died after drinking the tea from a poppy seed pod he purchased on the Internet.

In November 2012, a Tasmanian youth died after drinking tea brewed from seed heads, and a 50-year-old Tasmanian man died in similar circumstances in February 2011.

Some instances of death or injury associated with the consumption of poppy seed tea have involved users who combined the beverage with other nervous system depressants (i.e. alcohol, tranquillizers, benzodiazepines).
