= Solitary Islands Way =

Road in New South Wales

Solitary Islands Way New South Wales
- Coordinates: 30.2461°S 153.1414°E (South end); 29.9835°S 153.1414°E (North end)

General information
- Type: Road
- Length: 36 km (22 mi)
- Gazetted: 1 May 2014; Korora to Arrawarra; 22 December 2017; Arrawarra to Dirty Creek
- Maintained by: Coffs Harbour City Council
- Former route number: (A1) (mid 2013–December 2013) (National Route 1) (until mid 2013); Korora to Arrawarra (A1) (2013–2017) (National Route 1) (until 2013); Arrawarra to Dirty Creek

Major junctions
- South end: Pacific Highway; Korora, New South Wales
- North end: Pacific Highway; Dirty Creek, New South Wales

Location(s)
- Region: Mid North Coast
- LGA(s): Coffs Harbour
- Major suburbs: Moonee Beach, Woolgoolga, Corindi Beach

Highway system
- Highways in Australia; National Highway • Freeways in Australia; Highways in New South Wales

Solitary Islands Way is a road in the Mid North Coast region of New South Wales, located north of the city of Coffs Harbour. It links the towns of Woolgoolga and Corindi Beach to the Pacific Highway. It consists of a mix of newly constructed roads, pre-existing Council-owned roads and former sections of the highway that were bypassed by new alignments in 2013 and 2017.

== Route description ==
Solitary Islands Way is a 36.4-kilometre (22.6 mi) road stretching from Korora just north of Coffs Harbour to Dirty Creek near Halfway Creek. It passes through the towns of Moonee Beach, Woolgoolga and Corindi Beach. The section between Korora and Woolgoolga runs largely parallel and adjacent to the Pacific Highway.

The following sections of the road were previously part of the Pacific Highway and were bypassed by new alignments:

- between the southern end near Coachmans Close and Split Solitary Road at Korora
- between Woopi Drive and Arrawarra interchange via Woolgoolga
- between Tasman Street and Range Road interchange via Corindi Beach

Additionally, three sections of the road that were not previously Pacific Highway had other previous names:

- Hoys Road: between Moonee Beach Road and south of Bucca Road at Moonee Beach
- Graham Drive: between Emerald Heights Drive and Hearnes Lake Road at Sandy Beach
- Eggins Drive: between Arrawarra Beach Road and Gateway Lifestyle Lorikeet Holiday Park access at Arrawarra

== History ==
As part of the Pacific Highway Upgrade, the section between Coffs Harbour and Halfway Creek was progressively upgraded in the 2010s. The environmental assessment for the Sapphire to Woolgoolga upgrade of the highway in 2008 proposed a local access strategy, which involved the construction of new roads adjacent to the highway, using and upgrading existing Council-owned roads, or using the existing highway alignment as local access roads.

In February 2013, the Coffs Harbour City Council voted to name the new local access road as Solitary Islands Way. The Woolgoolga bypass of the highway opened to traffic on 16 December 2013, and the rest of the Sapphire to Woolgoolga upgrade was completed in July 2014. Solitary Islands Way was gazetted on 1 May 2014 as a 26.7 km (16.6 mi) local access road based on the local access strategy proposed in 2008, and consisted of:

- new roads parallel to the Pacific Highway, with some sections along former alignments of the highway
- Hoys Road at Moonee Beach, upgraded and renamed to Solitary Islands Way
- Graham Drive at Sandy Beach, renamed to Solitary Islands Way
- bypassed section of the highway within Woolgoolga, including a section of Clarence Street
- former alignment of the highway south of Split Solitary Road at Sapphire Beach

In October 2017, the Pacific Highway was bypassed between Arrawarra and Dirty Creek (Range Road) via Corindi Beach, as part of the Woolgoolga to Halfway Creek upgrade. The bypassed section of the highway and the existing Eggins Drive at Arrawarra were renamed Solitary Islands Way on 22 December 2017, extending the road northwards from Arrawarra to Dirty Creek.

In October 2020, Coffs Harbour City Council approved Woolgoolga's first set of traffic lights at the intersection of Solitary Islands Way and Centenary Drive, near Woolgoolga High School and the planned West Woolgoolga Sports Complex. The cost of the signalised intersection is estimated to be A$5.26 million. Construction is expected to begin in the second half of 2021.

== Major junction list ==
LGA	Location	km	mi	Destinations	Notes
Coffs Harbour	Korora	0	0.0	Pacific Highway (A1) (south) – Coffs Harbour, Newcastle, Sydney	Continues to Pacific Highway (south)
Coffs Harbour	Sapphire Beach	2.2	1.4	Pacific Highway (A1) (north) – Tweed Heads, Gold Coast, Brisbane; Pacific Highway (A1) (south) – Coffs Harbour, Newcastle, Sydney	Entry and exit for Pacific Highway southbound only Solitary Islands Way continues to the west
Coffs Harbour	Sapphire Beach	2.2	1.4	Split Solitary Road – Sapphire Beach	
Coffs Harbour	Sapphire Beach	2.3	1.4	Pacific Highway (A1) (north) – Tweed Heads, Gold Coast, Brisbane; Pacific Highway (A1) (south) – Coffs Harbour, Newcastle, Sydney	Entry and exit for Pacific Highway northbound only Solitary Islands Way continues to the north
Coffs Harbour	Sapphire Beach	2.3	1.4	Gaudrons Road	
Coffs Harbour	Moonee Beach	5.1	3.2	Pacific Highway (A1) (north) – Tweed Heads, Gold Coast, Brisbane; Pacific Highway (A1) (south) – Coffs Harbour, Newcastle, Sydney	Entry and exit for Pacific Highway northbound only
Coffs Harbour	Moonee Beach	5.1	3.2	Moonee Beach Road – Moonee Beach	To entry and exit for Pacific Highway southbound
Coffs Harbour	Moonee Beach	7.7	4.8	Killara Drive	Solitary Islands Way continues to the southeast
Coffs Harbour	Moonee Beach	7.9	4.9	Tiki Road	Solitary Islands Way continues to the northeast
Coffs Harbour	Emerald Beach	11.0	6.8	Pacific Highway (A1) (south) – Coffs Harbour, Newcastle, Sydney	To Settlers Road; Exit for Pacific Highway southbound only
Coffs Harbour	Emerald Beach	11.0	6.8	Brothers Drive	
Coffs Harbour	Emerald Beach	11.2	7.0	Pacific Highway (A1) (south) – Coffs Harbour, Newcastle, Sydney	Entry for Pacific Highway southbound only
Coffs Harbour	Emerald Beach	11.2	7.0	Fiddaman Road – Emerald Beach	
Coffs Harbour	Emerald Beach	12.4	7.7	Pacific Highway (A1) (north) – Tweed Heads, Gold Coast, Brisbane	Exit for Pacific Highway southbound only Solitary Islands Way continues to the north
Coffs Harbour	Sandy Beach	12.7	7.9	Pacific Highway (A1) (north) – Tweed Heads, Gold Coast, Brisbane; Pacific Highway (A1) (south) – Coffs Harbour, Newcastle, Sydney	Entry and exit for Pacific Highway northbound only
Coffs Harbour	Sandy Beach	12.7	7.9	Emerald Heights Drive	
Coffs Harbour	Sandy Beach	14.0	8.7	Diamond Head Drive – Sandy Beach	
Coffs Harbour	Sandy Beach	15.8	9.8	Pacific Highway (A1) (north) – Tweed Heads, Gold Coast, Brisbane; Pacific Highway (A1) (south) – Coffs Harbour, Newcastle, Sydney	Entry and exit for Pacific Highway northbound only
Coffs Harbour	Woolgoolga	16.1	10.0	Pacific Highway (A1) (south) – Coffs Harbour, Newcastle, Sydney	Southbound entry for Pacific Highway southbound only
Coffs Harbour	Woolgoolga	16.2	10.1	Hearnes Lakes Road	Northbound to southbound u-turn to (south)
Coffs Harbour	Woolgoolga	16.7	10.4	Pacific Highway (A1) (north) – Tweed Heads, Gold Coast, Brisbane	Exit for Pacific Highway southbound only
Coffs Harbour	Woolgoolga	16.7	10.4	Woopi Drive	
Coffs Harbour	Arrawarra	24.4	15.2	Pacific Highway (A1) (north) – Tweed Heads, Gold Coast, Brisbane; Pacific Highway (A1) (south) – Coffs Harbour, Newcastle, Sydney	
Coffs Harbour	Dirty Creek	36.4	22.6	Pacific Highway (A1) (north) – Tweed Heads, Gold Coast, Brisbane; Pacific Highway (A1) (south) – Coffs Harbour, Newcastle, Sydney	Entry and exit for Pacific Highway southbound only
Coffs Harbour	Dirty Creek	36.4	22.6	Range Road	To entry and exit for Pacific Highway northbound
1.000 mi = 1.609 km; 1.000 km = 0.621 mi: Incomplete access; Route transition

== See also ==
- Big River Way - bypassed section of Pacific Highway and the site of the Grafton bus crash
- Macleay Valley Way - bypassed section of Pacific Highway and the site of the Kempsey bus crash
- Giinagay Way - bypassed section of Pacific Highway at Nambucca Heads and Urunga
