= Giinagay Way =

Road in New South Wales

Giinagay Way New South Wales
- Coordinates: 30.7875°S 152.8839°E (South end); 30.4615°S 153.0036°E (North end)

General information
- Type: Road
- Length: 45.8 km (28 mi)
- Gazetted: 24 February 2017 (Warrell Creek to Valla); 14 July 2017 (Valla to Raleigh)
- Former route number: (A1) (2013–2018) (National Route 1) (until 2013); Warrell Creek to Nambucca Heads (A1) (2013–2016) (National Route 1) (until 2013); Nambucca Heads to Urunga

Major junctions
- South end: Pacific Highway; Eungai Creek, New South Wales
- North end: Pacific Highway; Waterfall Way; Raleigh, New South Wales

Location(s)
- Region: Mid North Coast
- LGA(s): Bellingen Shire; Nambucca Valley Council
- Major suburbs: Macksville, Nambucca Heads, Urunga

Highway system
- Highways in Australia; National Highway • Freeways in Australia; Highways in New South Wales

Giinagay Way is a road in the Mid North Coast region of New South Wales linking the towns of Warrell Creek, Macksville, Nambucca Heads and Urunga to Pacific Highway. It runs along a former section of the highway between Eungai Creek and Raleigh that was bypassed by a new parallel alignment between 2016 and 2018.

Giinagay means "Hello" or "Welcome" in the local Gumbaynggirr language.

== Route description ==
Giinagay Way is a 45.8-kilometre (28.5 mi) road stretching from Eungai Creek to Raleigh and passes through the towns of Warrell Creek, Macksville, Nambucca Heads and Urunga. The road passes through two local government areas, Bellingen Shire and Nambucca Valley Council.

== History ==
Many sections of the Pacific Highway had been bypassed since 1996 as part of the Pacific Highway Upgrade. The section between Nambucca Heads to Urunga was due to be bypassed by a new alignment in 2016. Bellingen Shire Council chose "Giinagay Way" as the proposed name of the old alignment, meaning "Hello" or "Welcome" greeting in the local Gumbaynggirr language. Nambucca Valley Council initially chose the name "Nambucca Valley Way", named after the council itself, but this was opposed by the Geographical Names Board of New South Wales (GNB) on the basis that the road also passed through Bellingen Shire. Nambucca Valley Council then chose "Rivers Way", but this was also opposed by the GNB as there was already a River Street in Nambucca Valley and a River Street and River Place in Bellingen Shire. Eventually, Nambucca Valley Council voted for the Giinagay Way name in February 2015. The new alignment opened on 22 July 2016.

In February 2017, the speed limits of Giinagay Way were reduced following a speed zone review. Changes include:

- 100 km/h speed limit from north of Nambucca Heads interchange to south of Valla Beach Rd at Valla Beach
- 90km/h speed limit from south of Valla Beach Rd to south of Ballards Road, north of Valla Beach
- 80km/h speed limit from south of Ballards Rd to the existing 50km/h speed limit within Urunga
- The speed limit between Urunga to Raleigh were unchanged

The section of Giinagay Way within Nambucca Valley Council was gazetted on 24 February 2017 and the section within Bellingen Shire was gazetted on 14 July 2017. The name was gazetted even before the section of Pacific Highway between Warrell Creek and Nambucca Heads had been realigned, which would bypass Warrell Creek and Macksville.

In late 2017, some Warrell Creek residents on the highway expressed their "fear" that "their sense of community will be lost" and were "concerned about confusion for emergency services" if the Giinagay Way name was used on the old alignment. They proposed alternative names such as "Warrell Creek Way" or "Warrell Way" with a possibility of dual naming system. However, there was already an Upper Warrell Creek Road in the area which may cause confusion. Additionally, the Giinagay Way name had already been gazetted earlier in February 2017. The old alignment was bypassed between December 2017 and June 2018.

== Major junction list ==
LGA	Location	km	mi	Destinations	Notes
Nambucca Valley	Eungai Creek	0	0.0	Pacific Highway (A1) (north) – Coffs Harbour, Tweed Heads, Gold Coast, Brisbane; Pacific Highway (A1) (south) – Newcastle, Sydney	Entry and exit to Pacific Highway southbound only
Nambucca Valley	Eungai Creek	0	0.0	Browns Crossing Road	
Nambucca Valley	Congarinni	0.5	0.31	Pacific Highway (A1) (south) – Newcastle, Sydney	Exit for Pacific Highway northbound only
Warrell Creek		6.4	4.0	Bridge over the creek. Bridge name unknown	
Nambucca Valley	Macksville	7.5	4.7	Pacific Highway (A1) (north) – Coffs Harbour, Tweed Heads, Gold Coast, Brisbane; Pacific Highway (A1) (south) – Newcastle, Sydney; Bald Hill Road	
Nambucca River		10.6	6.6	Bridge over the river. Macksville Bridge	
Nambucca Valley	North Macksville	12.6	7.8	Old Coast Road	To Pacific Highway (north)
Nambucca Valley	Nambucca Heads	21.2	13.2	Riverside Drive – Nambucca Heads	
Nambucca Valley	Nambucca Heads	23.8	14.8	Link Road – Nambucca Heads	
Nambucca Valley	Valla	24.6	15.3	Pacific Highway (A1) (north) – Coffs Harbour, Tweed Heads, Gold Coast, Brisbane; Pacific Highway (A1) (south) – Newcastle, Sydney	
Bellingen	Valla	35.0	21.7	Ballards Road	To Pacific Highway (north and south)
Bellingen	Urunga	36.8	22.9	Hungry Head Road – Urunga	
Bellingen	Urunga	41.7	25.9	Bellingen Street – Urunga	
Kalang River		42.0	26.1	Bridge over the river. Bridge name unknown.	
Bellingen	Raleigh	45.1	28.0	Pacific Highway (north) – Coffs Harbour, Tweed Heads, Gold Coast, Brisbane; Pacific Highway (south) – Newcastle, Sydney	Entry and exit to Pacific Highway southbound only
Bellingen	Raleigh	45.8	28.5	Waterfall Way (B78) (west) – Armidale	To entry and exit to Pacific Highway northbound only
Bellingen	Raleigh	45.8	28.5	Waterfall Way (B78) (east)	To Old Princes Highway and Keevers Drive
1.000 mi = 1.609 km; 1.000 km = 0.621 mi

== See also ==
- Big River Way – bypassed section of Pacific Highway and the site of the Grafton bus crash
- Macleay Valley Way – bypassed section of Pacific Highway and the site of the Kempsey bus crash
