= Waterfall Way =

Road in New South Wales, Australia

Waterfall Way New South Wales
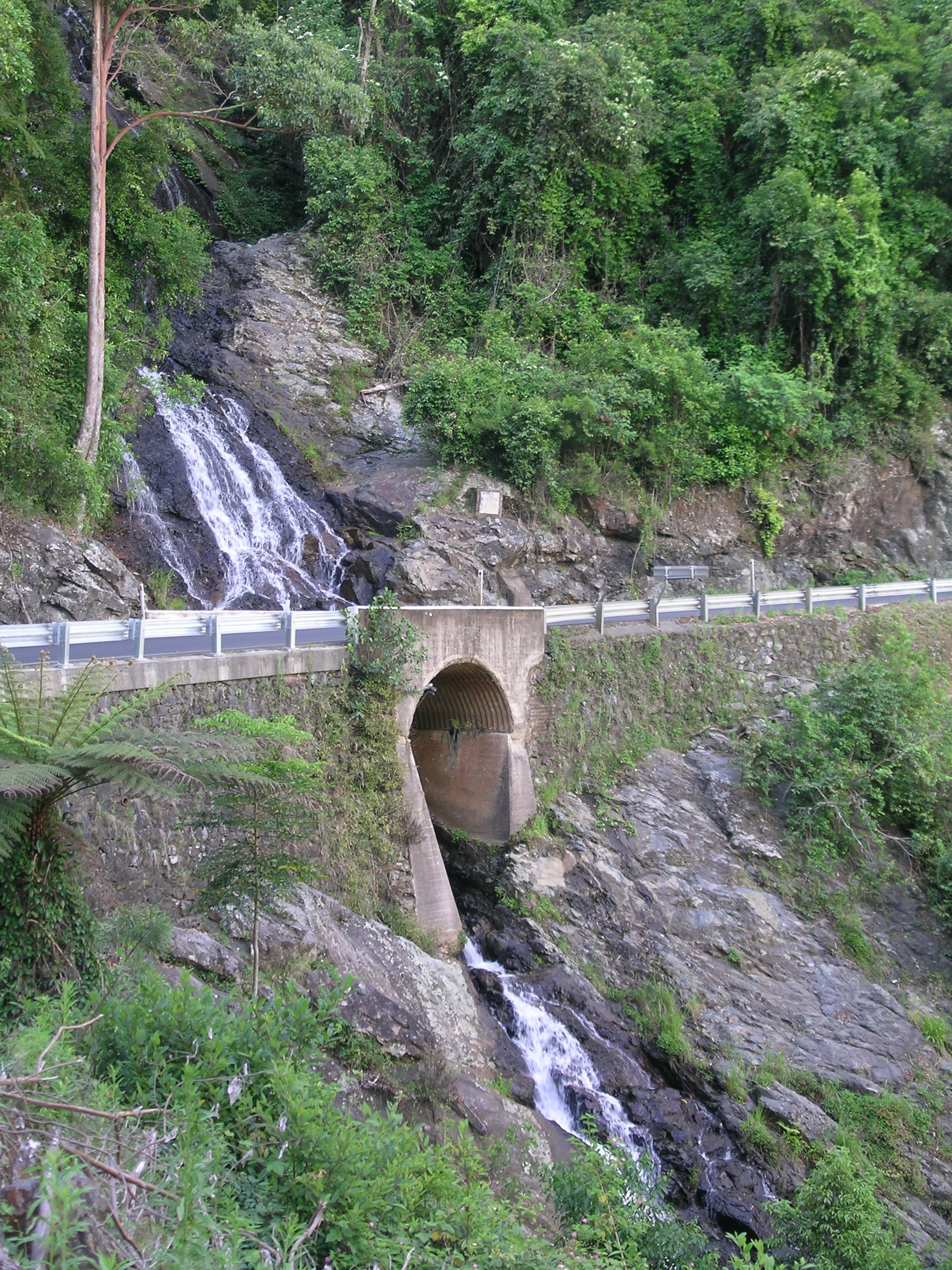
- Newell Falls, Waterfall Way, Dorrigo National Park
- Coordinates: 30.462237°S 153.000288°E (East end); 30.520560°S 151.679192°E (West end)

General information
- Type: Rural road
- Length: 169.8 km (106 mi)
- Gazetted: August 1928 (as Main Roads 119 and 120); March 1938 (as Trunk Road 76)
- Route number(s): B78 (2013–present)
- Former route number: State Route 78 (1974–2013)
- Tourist routes: Tourist Route 17 (Ebor–Armidale)

Major junctions
- East end: Giinagay Way; Raleigh, New South Wales
- Pacific Highway; Armidale Road; Guyra Road
- West end: New England Highway; Armidale, New South Wales

Location(s)
- Major settlements: Bellingen, Dorrigo, Ebor

Waterfall Way is a 170-kilometre (110 mi) country road in the Northern Tablelands region of New South Wales, Australia, linking Raleigh on the state's North Coast to Armidale. The route passes through some of New South Wales' most scenic countryside and has become well known as its best and Australia's third most beautiful tourist drive. Seven national parks, of which three are listed as World Heritage Areas by UNESCO and form part of the Gondwana Rainforests of Australia (formerly the Central Eastern Rainforest Reserves), are located on or close to the route. Dorrigo National Park encompasses the waterfalls that give the route its name.

In addition to being a tourist route, the Waterfall Way is also an important link between coastal and inland New South Wales (specifically the population centres of Armidale and Coffs Harbour), and is therefore heavily trafficked.

== Route ==
Starting just beyond the interchange with Pacific Highway at Raleigh, midway between Urunga and Coffs Harbour, it follows the south bank of the Bellinger River, passing through Bellingen. After crossing the Bellinger River the road swings north and climbs the escarpment of the Great Dividing Range, skirting the southern edge of the Dorrigo world heritage rainforest and crossing the Newell and Sherrard waterfalls for which the route is named. Single lane traffic restrictions do not permit stopping at these falls, but the Newell Falls may be viewed at a rest area below the fall. At the top of the escarpment (elevation 750 m (2,460 ft)) a short detour south leads to Griffith's Lookout with views over the Bellinger River National Park and valley.

A short way further on is the turnoff to the visitor centre at the World Heritage Area, Dorrigo National Park, known for its skywalk and walking tracks. The pretty and readily accessible Dangar Falls are located 2.4 km (1.5 mi) north of the centre of Dorrigo on the Bielsdown River. Proceeding through the town of Dorrigo, the road continues through the pastoral upland of the Dorrigo Plateau before crossing the headwaters of the Nymboida River. The Bicentennial National Trail shares the route prior to reaching Ebor. About nine kilometres after turning left onto the Armidale Grafton road Ebor is passed. This village is close to the Guy Fawkes River National Park and Ebor Falls.

Between Ebor and Wollomombi the route passes through the 8,839 ha (21,840 acres) Cathedral Rock National Park. The National Heritage listed Yooroonah Tank Barrier is approximately 12 km (7.5 mi) southwest of Ebor and near the route. After leaving Ebor the road passes an intersection, from where the Dutton Trout Hatchery, and Point Lookout are accessed about 10 km (6.2 mi) east of Waterfall Way in the New England National Park. Further on, the Wollomombi Falls are about 1 km (0.6 mi) south of the Waterfall Way. The 145,000 ha (360,000-acre) World Heritage listed Oxley Wild Rivers National Park is readily accessible from the Wollomombi Falls. From here the road passes 5 km (3.1 mi) north of the historical mining village of Hillgrove and the viewing platforms at Bakers Creek Falls and the Metz Gorge. There are also other more remote, interesting sites to visit on this Way to Armidale. The Gara Gorge is 18 km (11 mi) south-east of Armidale along the Castledoyle Road leading off the Waterfall Way just east of Armidale.

The road is sealed but relatively narrow and has a steep 14 km (9 mi) winding section. In recent years storms and associated flash flooding have washed away sections of the roadway where it rises to the ranges, leading to traffic being limited to one lane at the waterfalls on the Dorrigo Range.

== History ==
The passing of the Main Roads Act of 1924 through the Parliament of New South Wales provided for the declaration of Main Roads, roads partially funded by the State government through the Main Roads Board (later the Department of Main Roads, and eventually Transport for NSW). Main Road No. 119 was declared from the intersection with North Coast Highway, today Giinagay Way, at Raleigh via Bellingen to Dorrigo (and continuing northwards to Tyringham), Main Road No. 120 was declared from Dorrigo to Jock's Water south of Hernani (and continuing eastwards to Coramba), and Main Road No. 121 was declared from Jock's Water via Wollomombi to Armidale (and continuing northwards via Tyringham and Nymboida to the intersection with North Coast Highway, today Big River Way, at South Grafton) on the same day, 8 August 1928.

The Department of Main Roads, which had succeeded the MRB in 1932, declared Trunk Road 74 along this road, from Jock's Water via Wollomombi to Armidale (and continuing northwards via Tyringham and Nymboida to the intersection with Pacific Highway, today Big River Way, at South Grafton), subsuming Main Road 121, and Trunk Road 76, from the intersection with Pacific Highway at Raleigh via Bellingen and Dorrigo to the intersection with Trunk Road 74 near Jock's Water; the eastern end of Main Road 119 and western end of Main Road 120 were truncated to meet Trunk Road 76 at Dorrigo, on the same day, 16 March 1938.

The passing of the Roads Act of 1993 through the Parliament of New South Wales updated road classifications and the way they could be declared within New South Wales. Under this act, Main Road 76 (formerly Trunk Road 76) was extended west on 2 February 1996 to end at the intersection with New England Highway in Armidale: the western end of Main Road 74 (formerly Trunk Road 74) was truncated to meet Main Road 76 at Jock's Water. The road today, as Main Road 76, still retains this declaration.

Waterfall Way was later signed State Route 78 in 1974. With the conversion to the newer alphanumeric system in 2013, this was replaced with route B78.

== Major intersections ==
This table does not show any bridges (see Major stream crossings below)

LGA	Location	km	mi	Destinations	Notes
Bellingen	Raleigh	0.0	0.0	Giinagay Way – Valla	Eastern terminus of Waterfall Way and route B78
Bellingen	Raleigh	0.2	0.12	Pacific Highway (A1) – Coffs Harbour, Newcastle, Sydney	Parclo interchange
Bellingen	Dorrigo	41.1	25.5	Tyringham Road – Bostobrick	
Clarence Valley	Hernani	77.7	48.3	Armidale Road – Tyringham, South Grafton	
Armidale	Ebor	90.8	56.4	Guyra Road – Guyra	
Armidale	Armidale	165.0	102.5	Barney Street (west) – Armidale; Dangar Street (north) – Armidale	Roundabout
Armidale	Armidale	166.1	103.2	O'Connor Road (southwest) – Armidale; Memorial Avenue (southeast) – Armidale	Roundabout
Armidale	Armidale	169.8	105.5	New England Highway (A15) – Tamworth, Glen Innes, Tenterfield, Armidale Airport	Western terminus of Waterfall Way and route B78; Entrance to Armidale Airport 250m away
1.000 mi = 1.609 km; 1.000 km = 0.621 mi: Route transition

== Major stream crossings ==
The accompanying diagram shows the crossings of all major streams by the Waterfall Way.

== See also ==
- Highways in Australia
- List of highways in New South Wales
- List of highways numbered 78
