= Macleay Valley Way =

Road in New South Wales

Macleay Valley Way New South Wales
- Coordinates: 31.1275°S 152.8268°E (South end); 30.8538°S 152.9131°E (North end)

General information
- Type: Road
- Length: 39 km (24 mi)
- Maintained by: Transport for NSW
- Former route number: National Route 1 (1955–2013) Entire route; A1 (2013–2016) (Frederickton–Eungai)

Major junctions
- South end: Pacific Highway; South Kempsey, New South Wales
- Pacific Highway
- North end: Pacific Highway; Eungai Rail, New South Wales

Location(s)
- Region: Mid North Coast
- LGA(s): Kempsey Shire
- Major suburbs: Kempsey, Frederickton

Highway system
- Highways in Australia; National Highway • Freeways in Australia; Highways in New South Wales

The Macleay Valley Way is a road in the Mid North Coast region of New South Wales that connects the Pacific Highway to Kempsey and Frederickton. It runs along a former section of the Pacific Highway that was bypassed by a newer alignment between 2013 and 2016.

== Route description ==
The Macleay Valley Way branches from the Pacific Highway at the Kempsey South Service Centre. It follows the former Pacific Highway alignment. Instead of bypassing population centres, the Macleay Valley Way passes through the towns of Kempsey and Frederickton.

== History ==
Macleay Valley Way became the secondary road in two stages, as the new Pacific Highway was opened in two stages. The southern part of the new road is east of the old road which is now Macleay Valley Way through Kempsey. The northern part is west of the Macleay Valley Way. The new bridge over the Macleay River and bypass of Kempsey and Frederickton was opened first, on 27 March 2013.

The section north of Frederickton opened on 16 May 2016.

This northern section of Macleay Valley Way includes the part of the former Pacific Highway that was the site of the Kempsey bus crash which occurred in the locality of Clybucca in 1989 when two loaded tour buses collided head-on.

== Major junction list ==
LGA	Location	km	mi	Destinations	Notes
Kempsey	South Kempsey	0	0.0	Pacific Highway	Slim Dusty Interchange
Kempsey	South Kempsey	3.6	2.2	North Coast railway line	
Kempsey	South Kempsey	3.8	2.4	Angus McNeil Crescent – Crescent Head	
Kempsey	East Kempsey, Kempsey	6.1	3.8	Macleay River	
Kempsey	Frederickton, Bellimbopinni	14.5	9.0	Pacific Highway	Dunghutti Interchange
Kempsey	Seven Oaks	20	12	Smithtown Road – Gladstone, Smithtown, South West Rocks	
Kempsey	Clybucca	25.7	16.0	Plummers Lane – South West Rocks	
Kempsey	Clybucca	27.3	17.0	Clybucca Creek	
Kempsey	Barraganyatti	36.6	22.7	Barraganyatti Creek	
Kempsey	Barraganyatti, Yarrengai	39.0	24.2	Pacific Highway (A1 north) – Macksville, Coffs Harbour; Pacific Highway (A1 south) – Port Macquarie, Taree; Stuarts Point Road (east) – Grassy Head, Yarrahapinni, Stuarts Point; Blackbutt Shute Road (west)	
1.000 mi = 1.609 km; 1.000 km = 0.621 mi

== See also ==
- Big River Way – bypassed section of Pacific Highway and the site of the Grafton bus crash
- Giinagay Way – bypassed section of Pacific Highway at Nambucca Heads and Urunga
