= Kalang River (New South Wales) =

River in New South Wales, Australia

Coordinates: 30°28′S 152°50′E

Kalang River South Arm Bellingen River

Location
- Country: Australia
- State: New South Wales
- IBRA: NSW North Coast
- District: Mid North Coast
- Local government area: Bellingen

Physical characteristics
- Source: Great Dividing Range
  - location: 4 km south-south-west of Brinerville
  - elevation: 760 m (2,490 ft)
- Mouth: Bellinger River
  - location: east of Urunga
  - elevation: 0 m (0 ft)
- Length: 77 km (48 mi)

Basin features
- River system: Bellinger River catchment
- Tributaries
  - right: Cooks Creek (New South Wales), Woods Creek (New South Wales), Spicketts Creek
- National park: Bellinger River NP

Kalang River, a perennial river of the Bellinger River catchment, is located in the Mid North Coast region of New South Wales, Australia.

== Course and features ==
Kalang River rises within the Great Dividing Range, near Brinerville, and flows generally east before reaching its mouth at the Tasman Sea of the South Pacific Ocean, east of Urunga. The river descends 353 metres (1,158 ft) over its 77 kilometres (48 mi) course.

Parts of the Kalang River are contained within the Bellinger River National Park.

Towards its mouth, the river is transversed by the Pacific Highway, near Urunga.

== See also ==
- Rivers of New South Wales
- List of rivers of Australia
