= Corindi Beach, New South Wales =

Corindi Beach
- Suburb
- Interactive map of Corindi Beach
- Coordinates: 30°01′S 153°12′E
- Country: Australia
- State: New South Wales
- City: Coffs Harbour
- LGA: City of Coffs Harbour

Government
  - State electorate: Coffs Harbour
  - Federal division: Page

Population
  - Total: 1,802 (2021 census)
- Postcode: 2456

Corindi Beach, pronounced Cor-in-"dye" although Cor-in-"dee" is sometimes used, historically also known as Pipeclay Beach until a name change in 1954, Corinda until a forced change to be provided postal service to avoid confusion or by Red Bank as Corindi River was formerly known, is a beach and small seaside farming town located on the Mid North Coast of New South Wales, Australia. The village is situated 33 kilometres (21 mi) north of Coffs Harbour and 50 kilometres (31 mi) south of Grafton. The original village of Corindi is slightly north along the Pacific Highway at Post Office Lane and Casson Close. Corindi means "grey" in local indigenous language referring to the pipeclay on the beach.

Corindi is surrounded by the Tasman Sea to the east and the Pacific Highway to the west. The 30° south latitude line runs just north of Corindi Beach.

At the 2021 census, Corindi Beach had a population of 1,802. It is the site of the Yarrawarra Aboriginal Cultural Centre which provides information on the Gumbayngirr Aboriginal people's history and customs. Corindi and surrounds has become a major blueberry producer, with many locals and tourists working during the peak seasons picking fruit.

== Notoriety ==
- The 30° south latitude crosses the Australian east coast at Corindi Beach. The line runs just north of the town centre along Red Rock Beach. The 30th parallel is also the northern extent of the Tasman Sea and the Southern extent of the Coral Sea. The town has streets named after each of the adjacent seas as well as the Pacific Ocean.
- Corindi has the largest blueberry farm in Australia. Corindi has a long farming history since being settled by Europeans mainly for cattle and dairy but more recently blueberries.
- Corindi has a strong Aboriginal culture, celebrated through the Aboriginal local community and the Aboriginal cultural centre.
- The headland is the site of a massacre of the Gumbaynggirr indigenous people in the mid 19th century. A memorial has been erected at the base of the headland to commemorate this. The massacre began at Blackadders Creek when mounted police entered the camp. They started shooting and then pursued the survivors to the Corindi River where they continued shooting. Some people were then driven off the headland.
- The headland is named Red Rock because the rocks contain the rock jasper, an opaque silica.
- The place is known to local Gumbaynggirr people as Blood Rock and many members of the tribe's descendants now avoid the area as a consequence.

== Timeline ==
Gumbaynggir land for at least 30,000 years, possibly 120,000 years, based on recent research.

- 1840 An out-station of Captain John Pike's (Note: Captain John Pike was a captain in the 73rd Regiment and multiple station owner from the Hunter Region) Glenugie Station. The headland is named Red Rock because the rocks contain the rock jasper, an opaque silica.
- 1863 Corindi Station came to James Devlin after Pike's death.
- 1879 Corindi Station sold to Samuel Cohen (the first Mayor of Ulmarra).
- 1880 Land selections by settlers (including first by Casson on 22 July 1880).
- 1883 Cohen's general store.
- 1884 School opened.
- 1886 Casson's mail and passenger coach.
- pre-1888 Casson's Accommodation house.
- 1901 School moved to Upper Corindi location.
- 1909 Corindi Co-op Cheese Co cheese factory opened.
- 1909 Recreation and Racecourse Reserve gazetted.
- 1911 Corindi Public Hall opened.
- 1913 Corindi Cemetery gazetted.
- 1915 Corindi Public School moved to current location at Corindi Beach.
- 1915 Richards' 'Corindi Crossing' Subdivision south of school.
- 1941 Simmons' 'Pipeclay' Subdivision of Pacific Street
- 1962 Electricity connected
- 1980 Highway deviation west of town making Coral St a local road.
- 1980s Corindi Dam created.
- 1980s Yarrawarra Aboriginal Corporation established.
- 1986 Amble Inn opened
- 1980s Subdivision of inside of Pacific Street.
- 2002 Corindi Park estate subdivision
- 2007 Corindi Beach estate subdivision.
- 2015 Pacific Highway upgrade re-alignment further west starts.

== Aboriginal culture ==
The Gumbaynggir people have lived on this land for tens of thousands of years. The lands extend from the Nambucca River in the south to the Clarence River in the north. Muurrbay Aboriginal Language and Culture Co-operative has recorded the Gumbaynggirr language to enable it to be taught.

The Yarrawarra Corporation was established in the 1980s. The corporation created the Aboriginal art gallery and museum on Red Rock Road to share the local traditional history and culture.

Locally significant areas include Red Rock Headland, No Man's Land, The Old Farm, Arrawarra Fish Traps, Old Camp (Pipeclay Lake).

== Locally common wildlife ==
=== Birds ===
Passerine (perching birds)

- Australian magpie
- Magpie-lark (Peewee)
- Grey butcherbird
- Noisy miner, found in noisy groups

Charadriiformes

- Masked lapwing (Plover)
- Red-capped plover (found breeding by Pipeclay Lake)
- Silver gull (Sea gull)

Coraciiformes

- Kookaburra usually heard at dawn laughing

Parrots

- Yellow-tailed black cockatoo and glossy black cockatoo, found eating from native trees and flying with loud squawking calls
- Galah
- Rainbow lorikeet and scaly-breasted lorikeet usually found in groups
- Australian king parrot commonly seen in pairs
- Eastern rosella

Galliformes (heavy bodied ground birds)

- Australian brushturkey

Accipitriformes (birds of prey)

- Brahminy kite, found gliding high above over the dunes
- Osprey

Strigiformes (owls)

- Powerful owl

Frogmouths

- Tawny frogmouth

Pelecaniformes

- Australian white ibis

Columbiformes

- Crested pigeon

=== Mammals ===
- Eastern grey kangaroo
- Swamp wallaby
- Bandicoot
- Common brushtail possum
- Echidna
- Microbat

=== Reptiles and amphibians ===
- Lace monitor (Goanna)
- Frilled neck lizard
- Blue-tongued skink
- Red-bellied black snake
- Eastern brown snake
- Green tree snake
- Coastal carpet python
- Australian green tree frog

=== Ocean animals ===
- Wobbegong
- Bottlenose dolphin
- Humpback whale

=== Insects ===
- Huntsman spider
- Redback spider
- Australian native bees

=== Pest and introduced animals ===
Releasing exotic animals into the wild may damage the environment.

- Common myna
- Feral pigeon
- Wild boar
- Hare
- Rabbit
- Fallow deer
- Red fox

== Locally common plant life ==
=== Common natives ===
- Melaleuca (Paper bark), found in low swamp land
- Pandanus, found on Corindi headland
- Banksia shrub, found behind dunes
- Carpobrutus (Pigface), a succulent found on the sandy dunes
- Spinifex, can be seen tumbling along the beach during winds
- Brush cherry, Coffs Harbour City Council's floral emblem
- Mangroves, found around Pipeclay Lake

=== Pest and introduced plants ===
- Bitou bush, dominates native dune covering plants
- Fireweed, poisonous to livestock
- Lantana, toxic to livestock
- Asparagus fern, very invasive after escaping from gardens
- Senna (excluding the native senna acclinis), invasive dominating native vegetation

== Industry ==
=== Farming ===
Dairying was the main farming practice early on in the Corindi area. Oats and lucerne grew well as a crop for feeding the dairy cattle. Sugar cane planted in the 1880s. Fruit and corn also had been successfully grown in the 1890s in the "formation of soils superior to Woolgoolga". Bananas grown since the 1930s during the depression when timber slowed down and many moved to dairying.

=== Timber ===
Timber was a major industry in the past and some continues now.

=== Mining ===
Mining for gold was attempted starting in the late 1800s.

=== Horse racing ===
The Corindi Reserve was gazetted with a I racecourse in 1909 but was used in the 1880s. Zulu, the race horse, was ridden by Billy Morto, a stockman on the Corindi Station, in a maiden stakes in Grafton in July 1880. Zulu went on to win the 1881 Melbourne Cup at 100-1 odds. John Casson also picked Zulu not being a thoroughbred horse. Zulu Place is named for the local horse racing and stockman history of the area. Brumbies still roam in the wild throughout Barcoongere State Forest just north of Corindi. Jack Thompson, Australian Horse Racing Hall of Famer, would visit his parents in Corindi.

== Transport ==
=== Corindi Creek Bridge ===
- Location decided for bridge over Redbank River 1886. Bridge location discussion. Bridge underconstruction May 1888. The bridge is completed by Mr Taylor in Sep 1888.
- Crossing of Corindi Creek location selection 1899. A preferred location at Cohen's 1899.
- Site for a bridge surveyed in 1910.

The current concrete bridge on Coral Street was constructed in 2006 after the timber bridge was condemned.

=== Roads ===
- 1887 Tenders requested for road from Moonee Creek-Woolgoolga-Corindi.
- 1936 Pacific Highway to Pipeclay Beach Reserve emergency relief repairs requested.
- 1948 Repairs expected on road to Pipeclay in particular the deviation from the old road.
- 1985 Arrawarra Creek to Tasman St Pacific Highway upgrade

== Amenities ==
=== Corindi School ===
There have been 3 locations for the school. One near the old Corindi cemetery, location two near Upper Corindi Road, and the current location near Red Rock Road.

- July 1883 arrangements were made for the school
- October 1883 tender accepted to build the school
- December 1883 building is complete
- February 1884 school is being completed
- April 1884 School duties commenced with Mr McKay as teacher with 26 pupils enrolled
- January 1885 Alex D. McPhee is new teacher
- July 1885 George McIver is new teacher
- July 1888 Mr Thomas J. Connor is the new teacher at Woolgoolga and Corindi halftime schools
- July 1889 Miss Flora McLean starts as teacher at Corindi to allow full-time school
- Jun 1890 Eliza Dewing appointed teacher.
- 1900-1901 School moved to Upper Corindi previous location revoked on 1910 parish map.
- 1900 Miss Annie J Really replaces Mr E Gentle as teacher.
- February 1903 Mr J Lyons appointed teacher
- April 1915 Steps being taken to move school
- 1915 Temporary school in a building lent by James Simmons during relocation
- October 1915 moved to 'lower' Corindi at current position and dedicated in 1916 on 1910 parish map.
- 1941 John Fitz Chambers is teacher.
- 1943 Miss J Griffin teacher replacing Keith Neal when he joined the RAAF.

=== Corindi Cheese Factory ===
- Apr 1899 Butter factory shares canvassed by Mr McDougall for Corindi and Woolgoolga Apr 1899.
- Nov 1909 Corindi Cheese Factory opened 24 November 1909 opposite Upper Corindi Road near the school site
- Jul 1912 Corindi Cheese Factory producing a ton of cheese transported to South Grafton
- Oct 1913 Working full-time after being at halftime over winter.
- Feb 1915 closing of cheese factory
- Dec 1917 Talks of reopening the factory by sale by current owner to local farmer co-operative in Dec 1917.

=== Corindi Racecourse ===
- January 1888 Anniversary sports race day at Corindi
- March 1889 Racecourse proposed
- May 1909 discussion over Racecourse Reserve
- July 1909 Trustees gazetted for the 100 acre reserve
- April 1911 Race meet to be held at Corindi was abandoned due to rain.
- May 1912 Races held at Corindi
- June 1915 Bridle races held at Corindi in aid of the Belgian Fund
- April 1928 Corindi Picnic Race Club annual meeting held
- August 1941 Accidental death of Mr N Morris
- May 1944 Corindi Comforts Fund Easter Saturday sports meeting
- March 1951 Corindi Jubilee Cup
- September 1952 Spring race meet

=== Corindi Cemetery ===
- April 1912 Surveyor is to design a cemetery at Corindi
- August 1912 Notified on 1910 Parish map.
- April 1913 Trustees gazetted for Corindi Cemetery

=== Corindi Post Office ===
The original post office was located in Post Office Lane, Corindi. The current location is on Pacific Street, Corindi Beach. Petitioned for mail service in 1881 ignored.

- The postmaster-General consents to a post office at Corindi based on a name change from Corinda in 1886.
- Tender for mail service request starting Jan 1888.
- Mr Casson currently delivering mail by horse and contemplating a mail coach.
- Tender accepted for carrying mail 1897. Request for a Post Office in Sep 1888 and hence tenders called for Corindi Post Office in Oct 1888.
- Post Office established in the 1890s.
- Conveyance of mail by A. M. Fletcher tender acceptance from 1890.
- Proposed changes to postal service for change of days of delivery in 1892.
- Mail contract awarded to Mr F Casson Oct 1896.
- Mail contract awarded to Mr Kenny in 1899.
- Mail coach passes the sea by 2 miles in 1903.
- Mrs Toms the postmistress to 1909.
- Post and Telegraph office kept by John Casson in 1909.
- Mrs R. M. Loader was the post mistress to 1929. Lightning storm damaged the communications in 1929.

=== Telephone ===
- Telephonic communication recommended between Corindi and Woolgoolga in Sep 1888.
- c. 2019 Mobile phone tower construction off Kangaroo Trail Road

=== Corindi public hall ===
- July 1911 Hall opened and ball held
- Dec 1911 Boxing Day events planned

=== Tennis Court ===
- 1929 Corindi Tennis Club opened

== Organisations ==
=== Corindi Cricketers ===
- Win over Ulmarra in 1885.
- Playing in 1902.
- Win over Coffs in 1954.

=== Corindi Footballers ===
- Maiden match vs Woolgoolga in August 1910.

=== Corindi Clarence Progress Association ===
No longer active.

=== Pipeclay Reserve Trust ===
Currently active as the Corindi Beach Reserve Trust

=== Corindi P&C Association ===
Currently active.

=== Corindi Tennis Club ===
- Nov 1929 Opening of Corindi Tennis Club

=== Corindi Community Group ===
Currently active

=== Corindi Red Rock Breakers Soccer Club ===
- Established in 1997 and currently active

=== Corindi Bears Rugby League Club ===
- Established 1998, dissolved soon after.

=== Red Rock-Corindi Surf Life Saving Club ===
- Established in 1991. Currently active.

== Natural events ==
- 1884 drought
- 1936 fires
- 1942 bushfire
- 1943 flood
- 1952 drought
- 2012 Australia Day flood
- 2013 February flood
- 2020 Bushfires
