= Harwood Bridge =

Mostly disused roadbridge in New South Wales, Australia

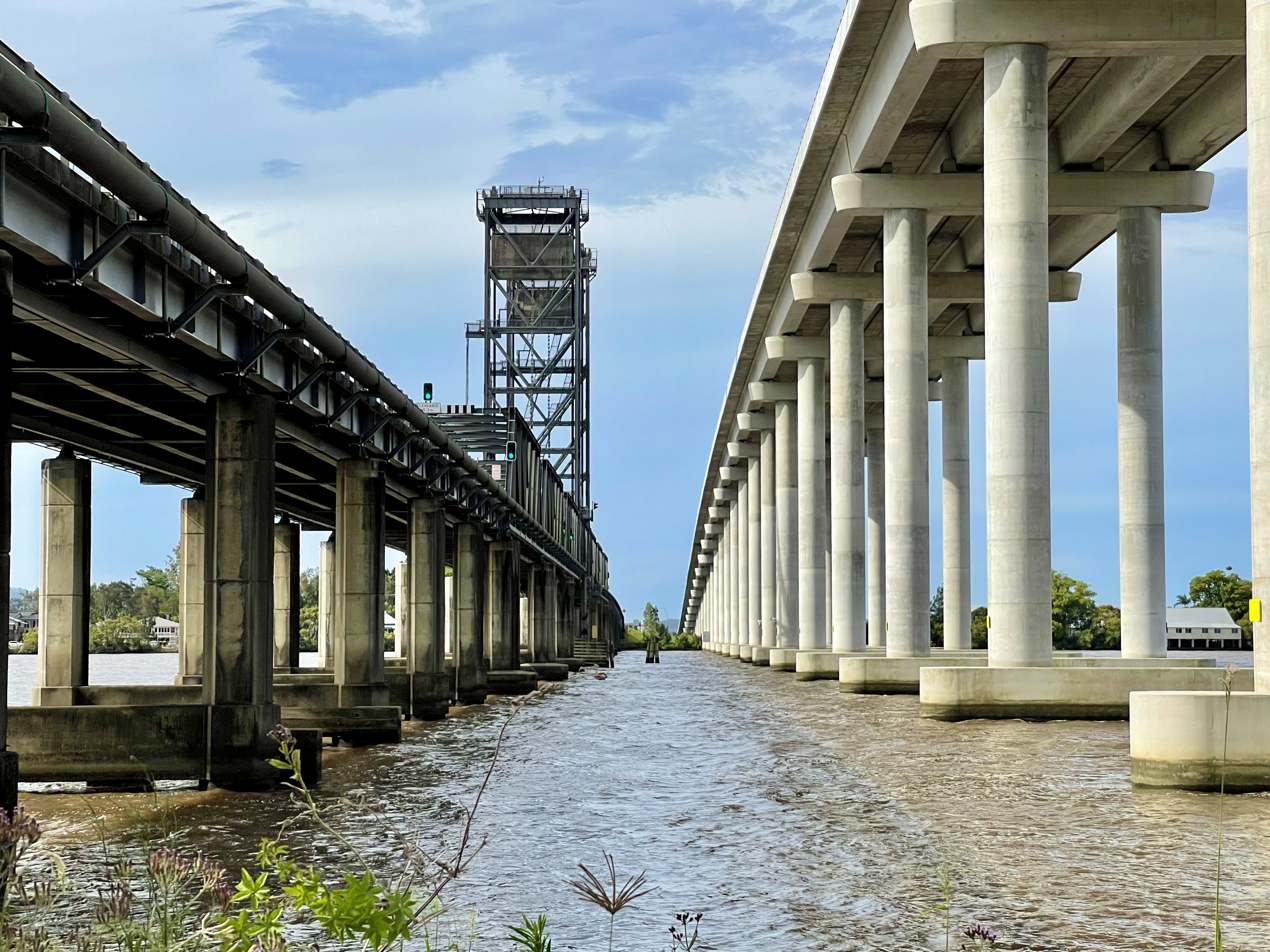
- Old and New Harwood Bridge
- Coordinates: 29°25′48″S 153°14′27″E
- Carries: 1966–2019: Pacific Highway; Since 2020: Local road; Motor vehicles; Grade-separated shared pedestrian footpath and cycleway
- Crosses: Clarence River
- Locale: Maclean, New South Wales, Australia
- Maintained by: Transport for NSW

Characteristics
- Design: Truss bridge with single vertical-lift span
- Material: Steel
- Total length: 888 metres (2,913 ft)
- Longest span: 43.1 metres (141 ft)
- No. of spans: 34: (7 truss – 27 girder)
- Piers in water: 19
- Clearance below: 37 metres (120 ft) using lift span
- No. of lanes: 2

History
- Construction cost: A$3.8 million
- Opened: 20 August 1966
- Replaces: Ferry (to 1966)
- Replaced by: 4-lane concrete bridge (since 2019: concurrent use)

The Harwood Bridge is a two-lane steel truss bridge which carried the Pacific Highway over the Clarence River in the Northern Rivers region of New South Wales, Australia from 1966 until 2019, when it was replaced by a four-lane 1.5-kilometre-long (4,921 ft) concrete bridge, located 20 metres (66 ft) to its east. The Harwood Bridge has been retained to provide access to Harwood Island.

== Description ==
The Harwood Bridge crosses the main channel of the Clarence River, about 10 kilometres (6.2 mi) upstream from the river mouth, and 46 kilometres (29 mi) by road from Grafton. It is located 6 kilometres (3.7 mi) from the town of Maclean at the village of Harwood. It carried the Pacific Highway from the south bank of the Clarence River onto Harwood Island, from where the highway crosses the Serpentine Channel onto Chatsworth Island then finally crosses the North Channel of the Clarence River via the Mororo Bridge (also a steel truss bridge) to the northern bank.

The Harwood Bridge was completed in August 1966, and replaced the last ferry crossing on the state highway system of New South Wales. Prior to the opening of the bridge, the river crossing was provided by three cable-guided ferries operating in parallel.

The bridge has a total length of 888 metres (2,913 ft), consisting of seven steel truss spans of 43.1 metres (141 ft) length and twenty-seven steel girder approach spans. The deck carries two lanes of traffic and a footway. One of the steel truss spans is a vertical-lift span, which allows vessels to navigate the Clarence River. However, this now occurs infrequently.

The Harwood Bridge formed part of a bypass of the town of Maclean and the village of Harwood. It is the longest, and last, in a series of steel truss bridges of a standard design built by the Department of Main Roads during the 1950s and 1960s, chiefly across the wide coastal rivers of New South Wales, and mostly on the Pacific Highway. Bridges of the same design were built on the Pacific Highway across the Hunter River at Hexham (1952), the South Channel of the Hunter River at Mayfield (1965, demolished 2009), the Karuah River at Karuah (1957), the Wollamba River as part of the Nabiac bypass (1958, demolished 2004), the Hastings River as part of the Port Macquarie bypass (1961), and the Macleay River at Kempsey (1959).

== Replacement bridge ==
The Pacific Highway was upgraded between Grafton and Ballina. Work included a replacement four-lane 1.5-kilometre-long (4,921 ft) concrete bridge, located 20 metres (66 ft) to the east of the Harwood Bridge, spanning the Clarence River and its adjacent floodplain. The new bridge was constructed between 2016 and December 2019, and the existing bridge has been retained to provide access to Harwood Island.

A grade-separated pedestrian footpath and cycleway has been retained on the Harwood Bridge.

== See also ==
- List of bridges in Australia
