= Moonee Beach =

Moonee Beach New South Wales
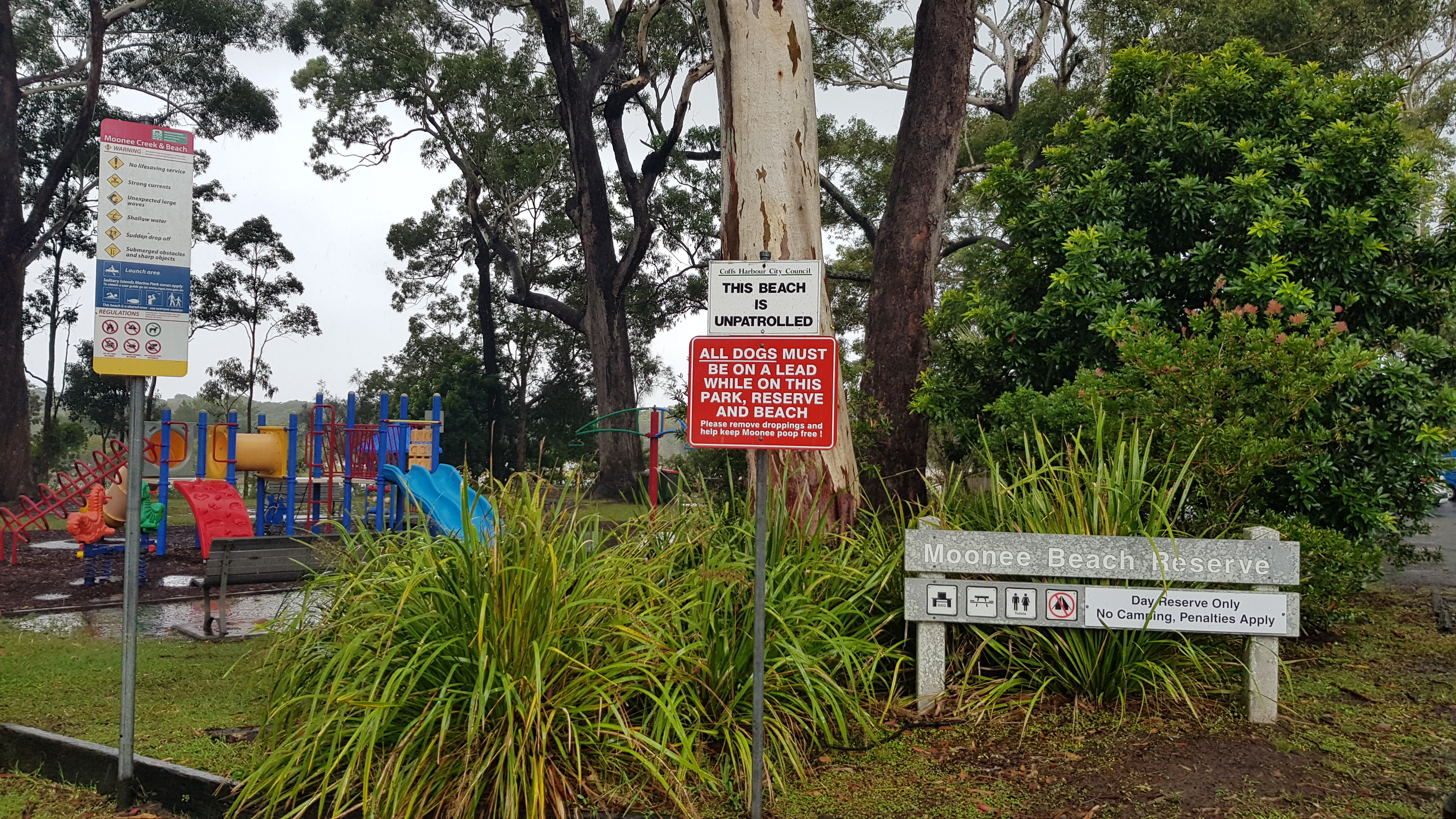
- Moonee Beach Reserve, 2023

- Coordinates: 30°12′19″S 153°09′07″E
- Population: 1,933 (2016 census)
- Established: 1870s
- Postcode(s): 2450
- Elevation: 35 m (115 ft)
- Location: 543 km (337 mi) from Sydney; 378 km (235 mi) from Brisbane; 13 km (8 mi) from Coffs Harbour; 14 km (9 mi) from Woolgoolga
- LGA(s): City of Coffs Harbour
- State electorate(s): Coffs Harbour
- Federal division(s): Page

Moonee Beach, Australia, is a small town on the Mid North Coast of NSW. It is located along the newly upgraded Pacific Highway. It is 13 km out of Coffs Harbour CBD, 543 km north of Sydney and 378 km south of Brisbane.

== Facilities ==
The shopping centre in Moonee Beach has both Coles and Aldi supermarkets, a Best & Less retail shop, a bakery, a chemist, a butcher, and a post office.

Apart from the shopping centre, Moonee Beach also has a caravan park and a creekside reserve for day use, a tavern used by locals and holiday makers, a day care centre and a fish and chip shop.
