= Big River Way =

Road in New South Wales

Big River Way New South Wales
- Coordinates: 29.7935°S 153.0240°E (South end); 29.4710°S 153.2057°E (North end)

General information
- Type: Rural road
- Length: 55 km (34 mi)
- Gazetted: 29 May 2020
- Maintained by: Transport for NSW
- Route number(s): (2020–present) (Glenugie–South Grafton); (2020–present) (South Grafton–Tyndale)
- Former route number: A1 (2013–2020); National Route 1 (1955–2013); Entire route

Major junctions
- South end: Pacific Highway; Glenugie, New South Wales
- Gwydir Highway; Summerland Way
- North end: Pacific Highway; Maclean, New South Wales

Location(s)
- Region: Northern Rivers
- LGA(s): Clarence Valley Council
- Major settlements: South Grafton, Grafton, Ulmarra

Highway system
- Highways in Australia; National Highway • Freeways in Australia; Highways in New South Wales

Big River Way is a road in the Northern Rivers region of New South Wales that connects the Pacific Highway to the city of Grafton. It runs along a former section of the Pacific Highway that was bypassed by a newer alignment in 2020.

== Route ==
Big River Way branches from Pacific Highway at Glenugie and follows the former Pacific Highway alignment via the city of Grafton and the town of Tyndale to Maclean, which runs along the Clarence River and South Arm.

== History ==
Many sections of the Pacific Highway had been bypassed since 1996 as part of the Pacific Highway Upgrade. The section between Glenugie and Maclean was due to be bypassed by a new alignment in 2020. The existing alignment was proposed to be renamed when the new alignment opens, with community consultation undertaken in 2019 to obtain suggestions and feedback from the community. Originally, the route names of Gwydir Highway and Summerland Way were to be extended along the road alignment towards Tyndale and Glenugie respectively. However, this was not supported by the community and so a local name was to be given instead. The route numbers of Gwydir Highway and Summerland Way, route B76 and route B91 respectively, would still be extended along the road alignment. In December 2019, Clarence Valley Council voted to endorse Big River Way as the new name for submission to the Geographical Names Board of New South Wales (GNB), and in February 2020, the new name was approved by the GNB.

The new alignment of the highway between Tyndale and Maclean opened on 1 April 2020. On a temporary basis, the northern end of the old Pacific Highway only connected to Cameron Street, with a left-in left-out temporary access to the newly-aligned Pacific Highway located to the south. On 19 May 2020, the new alignment between Glenugie and Tyndale opened and bypassed Grafton. The old alignment was the site of the Grafton bus crash in October 1989 when a semi-trailer and a bus collided head-on, resulting in the deaths of 21 people.

A week later, on 26 May 2020, the old Pacific Highway at Grafton was realigned onto a new link road intersecting perpendicular to Iolanthe Street (Summerland Way), as part of the New Grafton Bridge project. The previous alignment of the old Pacific Highway was reduced to northbound only. Three days later, on 29 May 2020, the old alignment of Pacific Highway between Glenugie and Maclean was officially renamed and gazetted as Big River Way.

In June 2020, Transport for NSW began to propose safety improvement upgrades on the Big River Way between Glenugie and Tyndale.

In August 2020, the Maclean Interchange fully opened and the Big River Way connected to a new roundabout with connections to Cameron Street and direct on-ramp and off-ramps to Pacific Highway. The temporary access to Pacific Highway to the south was also closed. In the same month, the roundabout at the intersection of Big River Way and Charles Street (Gwydir Highway) was completed and opened to traffic, marking the completion of major works on the New Grafton Bridge project.

The section between Glenugie and Grafton is signposted as B91, the route number for Summerland Way, and the section between Grafton and Tyndale is signposted B76, the route number for Gwydir Highway.

The passing of the Roads Act of 1993 updated road classifications and the way they could be declared within New South Wales. Under this act, Gwydir Highway (as Highway 12) was officially extended east along Big River Way from South Grafton to the Tyndale North interchange, and Summerland Way (as Main Road 83) was officially extended south along Big River Way from South Grafton to the Glenugie interchange, on 5 July 2022, although the road is still known locally and sign-posted as Big River Way. Gwydir Highway and Summerland Way today, as parts of Highway 12 and Main Road 83 respectively, still retain these declarations.

== Major junction list ==
Big River Way is entirely contained within the Clarence Valley Council local government area.

Location	km	mi	Destinations	Notes
Glenugie	0	0.0	Pacific Highway (A1 south) – Coffs Harbour, Newcastle, Sydney	Southern terminus of Big River Way and route B91
Glenugie	1.3	0.81	Eight Mile Lane – Sandy Crossing, Wooli	To Pacific Highway (A1 north) – Tweed Heads, Gold Coast, Brisbane)
South Grafton	13.3	8.3	Charles Street (Gwydir Highway) (B76) – Glen Innes, Moree, Walgett	Southern terminus of concurrency with route B76/B91 at roundabout
South Grafton	13.6	8.5	Iolanthe Street (Summerland Way) (B91) – Grafton, Casino, Kyogle	Northern terminus of concurrency with route B76/B91 at roundabout
Tyndale	41.6	25.8	Bensons Lane – Tyndale	To Pacific Highway (A1 south) – Coffs Harbour, Newcastle, Sydney
Tyndale	43.4	27.0	Pacific Highway (A1 north) – Tweed Heads, Gold Coast, Brisbane	No access between Pacific Highway and Big River Way (north); Northern terminus of route B76
Maclean	55.0	34.2	Pacific Highway – Sydney, Coffs Harbour, Tweed Heads, Brisbane; Cameron Street (west) – Maclean; Goodwood Street (east) – Townsend, Brooms Head	Maclean Interchange; Northern terminus of Big River Way at roundabout
1.000 mi = 1.609 km; 1.000 km = 0.621 mi: Concurrency terminus; Incomplete access; Route transition

== See also ==
- Macleay Valley Way – bypassed section of Pacific Highway and the site of the Kempsey bus crash
- Giinagay Way – bypassed section of Pacific Highway at Nambucca Heads and Urunga
