= Warrell Creek, New South Wales =

Town in New South Wales, Australia

Coordinates: 30°46′S 152°53′E

Warrell Creek is a locality on the Mid North Coast of New South Wales, Australia. It is situated on the Pacific Highway 8 km south of the township of Macksville, 15.5 km west of the coastal village of Scotts Head and 11 km north of the Eungai locality.

In recent years the locality has seen some growth including the construction of a Rural Fire Service outpost.

Warrell Creek, the watercourse, flows from the Eungai locality (where it is known as Eungai Creek), past Warrell Creek village, then past Scotts Head, finally flowing into the mouth of The Nambucca River at Nambucca Heads.

The North Coast railway line passes through, and a station existed at, the site between 1919 and 1974. Prior to the mid-1980s Pacific Highway upgrade, Warrell Creek was a small saw-milling village. Facilities at the village included a primary school, a railway station, a shop, and a service station. That highway re-alignment resulted in the demolition of the local school, shop and other dwellings.

Preceding station	Former services	Following station
Macksville towards Brisbane	North Coast Line	Eungai towards Maitland
