= Western Road Liners =

Australian bus and coach company

- Parent: Peter McQuie
- Commenced operation: May 1975
- Headquarters: Parkes
- Service area: Western New South Wales
- Service type: Bus & coach services
- Depots: 1
- Fleet: 26 (March 2015)
- Website: www.westernroadliners.com.au

Western Road Liners is an Australian bus and coach company operating route, school and charter services in Parkes.

== History ==
Western Road Liners was formed in 1971 when Merv Hennock and Peter McQuie purchased Reg Waser's Bus Lines. In 1983 the school runs of Allan Waser were purchased.

In 1986 Golden Tours, Loftus was purchased as a base for Western Road Liners to operate charters in Sydney. Included was route 64, the Bundeena town service. This was sold in 1990 to Maianbar Bundeena Bus Service.

In December 1987 Western Road Liners commenced operating interstate coach operations between Sydney and Brisbane, Sydney and Melbourne, Sydney and Adelaide and Melbourne and Adelaide branded as Trans City Express. By August 1991 Trans City was operating a Parkes to Canberra service. In March 1992 all Trans City operations ceased.

In November 1989 Western Road Liners commenced operating a service from Dubbo to Broken Hill under contract to CountryLink as a replacement for the Silver City Comet, followed from June 1990 by another from Canberra to Cootamundra and Bathurst/Dubbo.

In May 2006 Harris Bus Lines, the other large Parkes operator, was purchased.

== Routes ==
Western Road Liners operates route services within Parkes. From January 2008 until December 2014, it operated a thrice-weekly service from Parkes to Condobolin under contract to NSW TrainLink.

== Fleet ==
As at December 2019, the fleet consists of 26 vehicles. Fleet livery is white with red, yellow and green stripes.
