= Kempsey bus crash =

Bus accident

Coordinates: 30.984416°S 152.920374°E

Details
- Date: 22 December 1989; 02:40
- Location: Pacific Highway, Clybucca Flat, Kempsey, New South Wales
- Country: Australia
- Operator: McCafferty's; Trans City Express
- Cause: Bus driver fatigue on the McCafferty's coach, narrow highway.

Statistics
- Vehicles: 2
- Deaths: 35
- Injured: 41

On 22 December 1989, two coaches collided head-on near Kempsey in New South Wales on the Pacific Highway. The crash (referred to as the Kempsey bus crash or the Clybucca bus crash) involved a McCafferty's express service from Brisbane to Sydney and a Trans City Express express service from Sydney to Brisbane. Thirty-five people were killed and 41 people were injured, making it the worst road crash in Australia.

== Crash ==
The impact snapped seats from their anchor bolts. Seats and passengers were thrown forward in the vehicles with a terrific amount of force, which also trapped people and their luggage against the fronts of the buses. The force of the impact left the Sydney-bound coach, operated by McCafferty's, embedded in the front five rows of the cabin of the Brisbane-bound coach, operated by Trans City Express. The crash triggered a major emergency response as police, State Emergency Service and volunteer rescuers, firefighters and paramedics attended the crash.

A fleet of air ambulances and helicopters carried the injured to hospitals at Kempsey, Port Macquarie, Coffs Harbour and Sydney. A New South Wales Coroner's inquiry into the collision found that the driver of the McCafferty's coach fell asleep at the wheel. This caused his vehicle to travel straight on through a left-hand curve on the highway and collide with the Trans City Express coach. There was no indication that the driver had applied his brakes or dimmed the headlights, the coroner found. Neither coach was speeding at the time of the crash, and no mechanical faults were found in either vehicle.

== Coronial inquest and aftermath ==
The coroner (Kevin Waller) endorsed the recommendation he made following the Grafton bus crash two months earlier, that the Pacific Highway be upgraded to dual carriageway between Newcastle and the Queensland border.

The New South Wales and Commonwealth governments committed to carry out the required work, with an initial promised completion date of 2006. This target never came close to being met; at July 2008, only 267 kilometres (or 39%) of the route had been upgraded to dual carriageway standard, with 87 kilometres of divided road under construction and 325 kilometres of the highway still a single carriageway.

As of May 2016, following a sustained upgrade program, 437 kilometres (65%) of the highway between Hexham and the Queensland border was dual carriageway (either at freeway or arterial road standards), with 240 kilometres of single carriageway remaining to be upgraded. The final section was completed in December 2020, bringing an end to the project after 24 years.

The coroner also recommended research into coach seats, seat anchorages and seatbelts. Better emergency exits for coaches were also recommended, as rescuers were hindered in their initial efforts to enter the wreckage by the positioning of the exits 2.4m from the ground.

Following the collision and despite the extensive damage incurred, both Denning Landseer coaches were rebuilt by Denning, being completed in June 1990 and allocated body numbers 1378 (Trans City Express – original body 1238) and 1379 (McCafferty's – original body 1335). After the demise of Trans City Express in March 1992, much of its fleet was sold off and McCafferty's was among the purchasers, buying three coaches including the one involved in the crash. Both of the rebuilt coaches remained in service with McCafferty's for more than a decade.

The McCafferty's coach from the Kempsey crash was involved in another crash exactly 14 years later, in the early hours of 22 December 2003. On this occasion the coach was travelling south towards Rockhampton on the Bruce Highway when it was involved in a head-on collision with a truck. On this occasion there were no fatalities, with six people suffering minor injuries. However, the coach was damaged beyond economic repair and was written off.

This collision and the Grafton bus crash eight weeks earlier were described as "arguably Australia’s most catastrophic examples of high consequence/low probability incidents in the bus industry" in a bus safety discussion document.

The section of the Pacific Highway where the collision occurred was bypassed in May 2016 by a dual carriageway as part of the upgrades recommended by the coroner and is now named Macleay Valley Way.
