= Pacific Highway (Australia) =

Highway in New South Wales and Queensland

Pacific Highway New South Wales
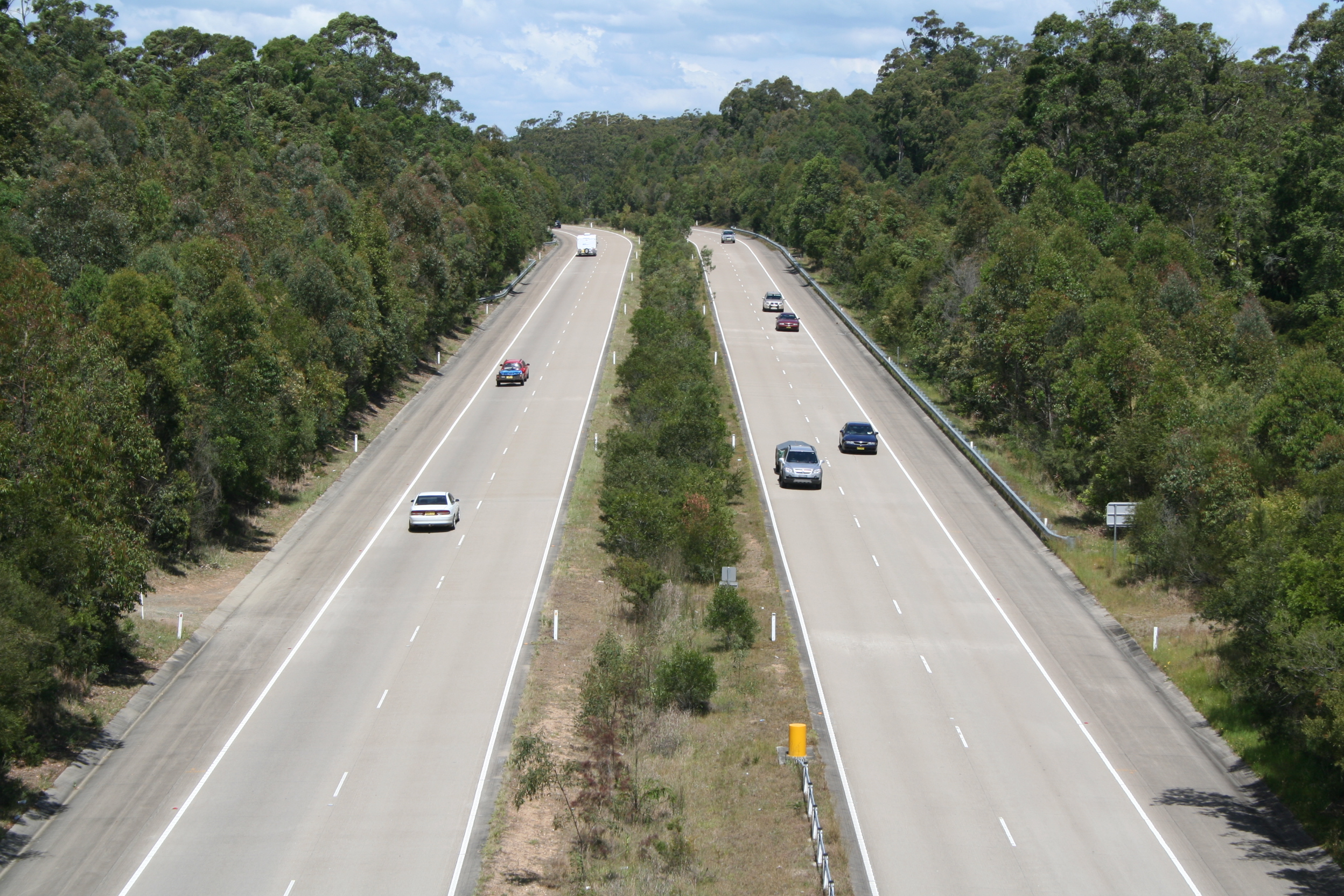
- View of the Pacific Highway from Wattley Hill Road, New South Wales (c. 2007)

General information
- Type: Highway
- Length: 779 km (484 mi)
- Gazetted: August 1928 (NSW, as Main Road 10); December 1930 (QLD)
- Route number(s): M1 (Brunswick Heads–Glenugie); A1 (Glenugie–Raleigh); M1 (Raleigh–Port Macquarie); A1 (Port Macquarie–Hexham); A43 (Hexham–Mayfield West, Newcastle West–Doyalson); B83 (Kariong–Wahroonga); A1 (Wahroonga–Artarmon); Concurrency: A38 (Roseville–Chatswood)
- Former route number: See Former route numbers

Major junctions
Brunswick Heads to Warabrook
- North end: Pacific Motorway
- Bruxner Highway; Big River Way; Big River Way; Waterfall Way; Oxley Highway; New England Highway; Newcastle Inner City Bypass; Industrial Drive
- South end: Maitland Road
Wickham to Tuggerah, then Ourimbah to Wyoming
- Northeast end: Stewart Avenue
- Newcastle Inner City Bypass; Central Coast Highway; Motorway Link
- Southwest end: Mann Street
Kariong to North Sydney
- North end: Wisemans Ferry Road
- Cumberland Highway; Pacific Motorway; Mona Vale Road; Ryde Road; Gore Hill Freeway; Lane Cove Tunnel
- South end: Warringah Freeway

Location(s)
- Major settlements: Ballina, Central Coast, Coffs Harbour, Kempsey, Port Macquarie, Newcastle, Taree, Sydney; Brisbane, Gold Coast

Highway system
- Highways in Australia; National Highway • Freeways in Australia; Highways in New South Wales

The Pacific Highway is a national highway and major transport route of 790 kilometres (490 mi) along the east coast of Australia from Sydney to Brisbane. It is an integral part of Highway 1 which circumnavigates the Australian continent. At its inception, the highway was a single carriageway between Sydney and Brisbane. In Australian culture and as a tourist drive, it remains so. Over time, segments of the highway have been upgraded, realigned, or renamed. Between 1996 and 2020, sections of the highway were upgraded to controlled-access highway (motorway) standards.

== Location ==
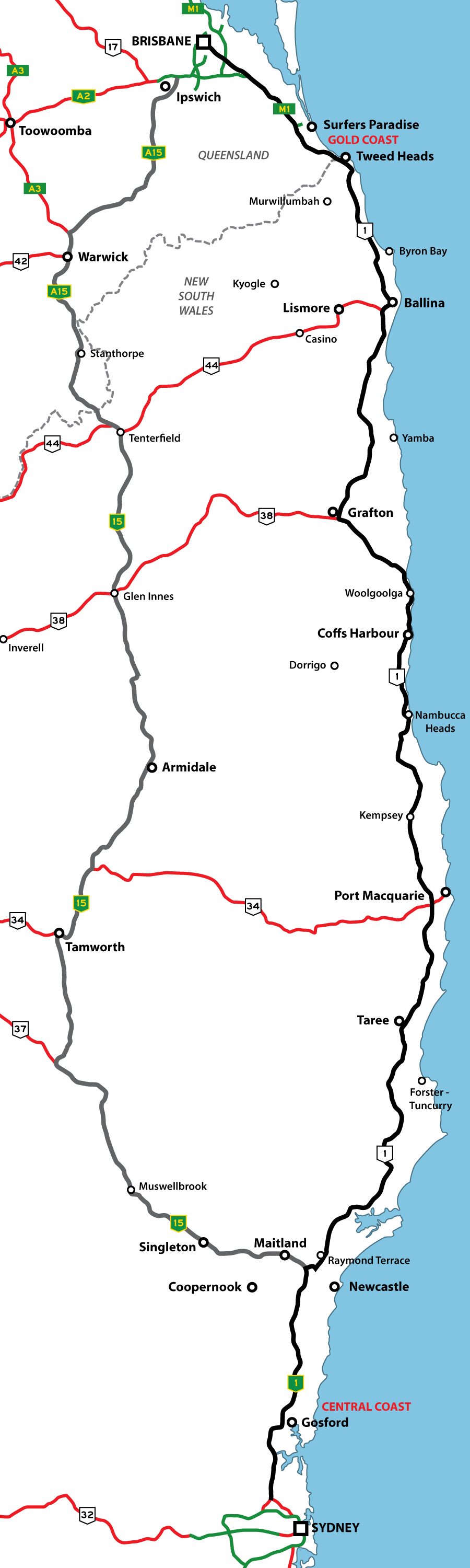

A map of Pacific Highway between Nambucca Heads to its northern terminus, northwest of Byron Bay. Thereafter, Pacific Motorway continues north to Brisbane.
KEY

Pacific Hwy
New England Hwy
Other major highways
Other freeways/motorways/expressways

The Pacific Highway is divided into the following sections:

- Brisbane to the New South Wales–Queensland border: This section has been completely replaced by the Pacific Motorway.
- Queensland border to Brunswick Heads: Upgraded to motorway standard under the 1996 Upgrade Masterplan and renamed the Pacific Motorway in 2013.
- Brunswick Heads to Raymond Terrace: Converted to dual carriageway or freeway standard, with works completed in 2026.
- Raymond Terrace to Wahroonga: Replaced as the main national route by the Pacific Motorway (also known as the Sydney–Newcastle Freeway and formerly the F3 Freeway). This occurred progressively between 1965 and 2026.
- Wahroonga to Sydney CBD: Remains a divided metropolitan road, formerly part of the Metroad system. A motorway alternative is provided via the M2 route, incorporating the Lane Cove Tunnel, M2 Hills Motorway, and NorthConnex.

=== Gazette definition ===
Since the most recent declaration of the highway in the April 2010 gazette, the New South Wales section of the highway is officially made up of four separate sections: Warringah Freeway, North Sydney to Gosford Interchange near Kariong; Henry Parry Drive, Wyoming to Pacific Motorway at Ourimbah Interchange; Wyong Road, Tuggerah to Hunter Street, Newcastle; and Maitland Road, Warabrook to the state border with Queensland. Since February 2013, the freeway section of the highway north of Brunswick Heads is also concurrently gazetted and is named and signposted Pacific Motorway. South of here, the section between Brunswick Heads and Bruxner Highway near Ballina is also signposted Pacific Motorway, however, it was not declared as such in the gazette as of February 2019, therefore it remains as only Pacific Highway in the gazette. Former sections of the highway removed from the gazette, such as between Gosford and Tuggerah, are still signposted as Pacific Highway.

Major cities and towns along Pacific Highway include: Gosford, Wyong, Newcastle, Taree, Port Macquarie, Kempsey, Coffs Harbour, Grafton, Ballina and Byron Bay, all in New South Wales; and Gold Coast in Queensland.

Major river crossings include the Hawkesbury, Hunter, Myall (east of Bulahdelah), Manning (south of Coopernook), Hastings (west of Port Macquarie), Macleay (east of Frederickton), Nambucca (near Macksville), Bellinger (near Raleigh), Clarence (via the Harwood Bridge near Maclean), Richmond (at Ballina), Brunswick, and Tweed rivers.

=== Sydney to Kariong ===
From Sydney, Pacific Highway starts as the continuation of Bradfield Highway at the northern end of the Sydney Harbour Bridge, immediately north of the Sydney central business district, and is the main route as far as the suburb of Wahroonga. Between the Harbour Bridge and the Gore Hill Freeway at Artarmon, the highway has no route number. From Gore Hill Freeway to Wahroonga, it is designated as route A1. When the Warringah Freeway was constructed in the late 1960s, southbound traffic was diverted through North Sydney via Mount Street, and in October 1985 it was redirected via Berry Street.

From Wahroonga Kariong, the Pacific Highway runs mostly parallel to the freeway, before diverting through the Central Coast via Gosford and Wyong. The section from Cowan to Kariong follows a winding scenic route with speed limits of 60 or 70 km/h (37 or 43 mph).

=== Kariong to Raymond Terrace ===
The section of the former Pacific Highway from the Wiseman’s Ferry Road junction at Kariong to the Gosford exit near Brian McGowan Bridge was redesignated as the Central Coast Highway, A49. North of Gosford, the highway continues without a route number through the Central Coast suburbs of Ourimbah and Wyong, before connecting with a spur of the Pacific Motorway near Doyalson, signed as route A43. At this point, the Pacific Highway is signed as route A43 for most of its length, forming a four- to six-lane regional highway that passes Lake Macquarie and continues through the suburbs of Lake Macquarie and Newcastle before rejoining route A1 at Raymond Terrace.

From Bennetts Green to Sandgate, the highway is paralleled by the Newcastle Inner City Bypass, which runs through New Lambton and Jesmond.

=== North of Raymond Terrace ===
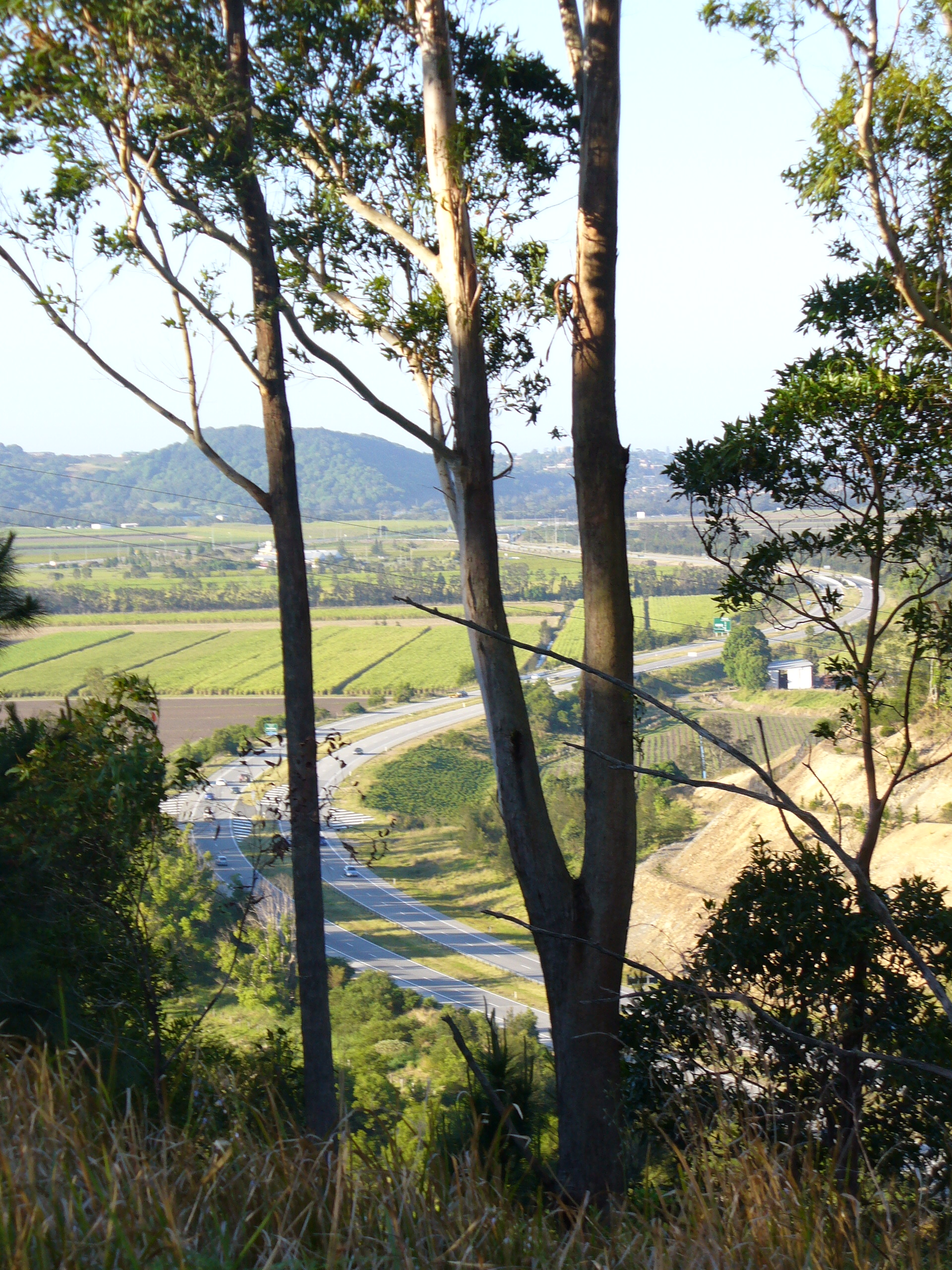
From the hill, showing the Chinderah-Yelgun section of the highway as it sweeps through the Tweed Valley.

From Raymond Terrace, the Pacific Highway passes through the Mid North Coast and Northern Rivers region to Brunswick Heads where it becomes the Pacific Motorway continuing to Brisbane.

=== Former sections ===
Former sections of the Pacific Highway were created when parts of the route were removed from the gazette definition or bypassed by new alignments. Some former sections of the Pacific Highway that were removed from the gazette definition continue to be referred to and signposted as Pacific Highway.

==== Removed from gazette definition ====
Between Sydney and Raymond Terrace, some sections of the highway were re-gazetted as other roads or are no longer included in the gazette definition of the Pacific Highway. However, as of January 2019, many of these roads are still referred to and signposted as the Pacific Highway.

The first two sections of the highway to be removed from the gazette was the Calga to Kariong section and a section in Gosford between Racecourse Road/Etna Street and Brian McGowan Bridge in November 1996. The remaining section within Gosford, between Kariong and Brian McGowan Bridge, was re-gazetted and renamed Central Coast Highway in August 2006. These changes resulted in the previously undivided section between Ourimbah and Sydney to be split into two: Kariong to Sydney, and Ourimbah to Wyoming.

The April 2010 gazette removed the sections between Racecourse Road/Etta Street and Henry Parry Drive/Pemmel Street in Gosford, between Ourimbah and Tuggerah, and between Hunter Street and Industrial Drive in Newcastle from the existing declaration of the highway, but redeclared the section between Calga and Kariong. As of January 2019, this is the most recent gazette to redefine the declaration of Pacific Highway. Even though these three removed sections are not gazetted as part of Pacific Highway anymore, street signage continues to show "Pacific Highway" and maps often show both the current road name and "Pacific Highway" together.

In Queensland, Pacific Highway used to go into Brisbane, however, most sections have been renamed to other roads or highways. For example, the section of Pacific Highway between Coolangatta and Currumbin is now part of Gold Coast Highway.

==== Bypassed ====
Sections of the highway between Raymond Terrace and the Queensland/NSW border that were bypassed and replaced by new sections of Pacific Highway, were renamed and downgraded to local roads, and are no longer part of Pacific Highway. As the new sections are just bypasses, this meant that the section between Raymond Terrace and Queensland border is still a continuous route. Prominent bypassed sections of the highway between Raymond Terrace and the border include:

- The former 151 kilometres (94 mi) section Twelve Mile Creek and Taree through Stroud and Gloucester, with the new route over mostly dirt roads gazetted in 1952. The affected roads were upgraded over a number of years, including the construction of major bridges to replace the low-level crossing at Nabiac and the ferry at Karuah. The upgrading of the northern section was completed first and through traffic ran temporarily over the road between Bulahdelah and Booral. The southern part from Bulahdelah to Twelve Mile Creek via Karuah was completed about 1960. The old section was later renamed Bucketts Way.
- The former 39 kilometres (24 mi) section through Kempsey and Frederickton which included the site of the Kempsey bus crash. This section was replaced by a new freeway bypass and bridge over the Macleay River in 2013 and 2016, and was renamed the Macleay Valley Way.
- The former 46 kilometres (29 mi) between Eungai Creek and Raleigh via Macksville and Nambucca Way. This section was bypassed in 2016 and 2018 and was renamed Giinagay Way
- The former 55 kilometres (34 mi) section between Glenugie and Maclean via Grafton which included the site of the Grafton bus crash. This section was replaced by a new alignment of the highway in 2020 and was renamed Big River Way.

In May 2009, the portion of the Tugun Bypass (newly opened in June 2008) within New South Wales boundaries was declared as the new alignment of Pacific Highway between Tweed Heads interchange and the Queensland border. The 1-kilometre-long (0.62 mi) older bypassed alignment along Tweed Heads Bypass (opened 1992) towards the border at Coolangatta was gazetted as Gold Coast Highway instead, extending the already existing Gold Coast Highway in Queensland, into New South Wales. The Tugun Bypass was handed over to the NSW government in June 2018. The section of the bypassed highway within Queensland borders between Stewart Road and Gold Coast Highway was officially renamed Tugun-Currumbin Road, but is signposted as Stewart Road.

== History ==
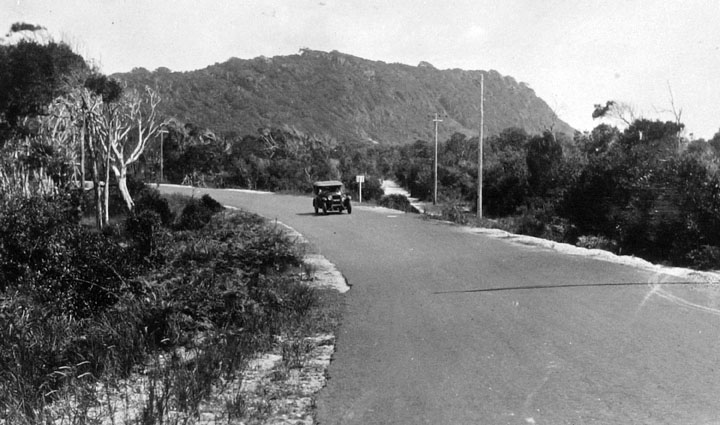
Pacific Highway near Burleigh Heads, 1934

Initially, the primary mode of transport connecting the coastal areas between Sydney and Brisbane was by boat. However, a continuous inland route from Newcastle to Brisbane via the Northern Tablelands had been in existence since the 1840s. A direct coastal route between Sydney and Newcastle was not completed until 1930, and completion of the sealing of the Pacific Highway did not occur until 1958 (at Koorainghat, south of Taree). The last of the many ferries across the coastal rivers was not superseded by a bridge until 1966 (the Harwood Bridge across the south channel of the Clarence River, the north channel having been bridged in 1931).

Between 1925 and 1930 the Main Roads Board of New South Wales reconstructed and sealed a route between Hornsby and Calga that had been abandoned some forty years earlier, to provide a direct road link between Sydney and Newcastle. In addition, a replacement route from Calga into the gorge of Mooney Mooney Creek and up to the ridge at Kariong above Gosford was also required. This new Sydney–Newcastle route via Calga and Gosford was some 80 kilometres (50 mi) shorter than the previous route via Parramatta, McGraths Hill, Maroota, Wisemans Ferry, Wollombi and Cessnock. At first, the old Peats Ferry was reinstated to cross the Hawkesbury River, with construction of the bridge not beginning until 1938, due to the Great Depression. Due to the onset of the Second World War, the Peats Ferry Bridge was not completed until May 1945.

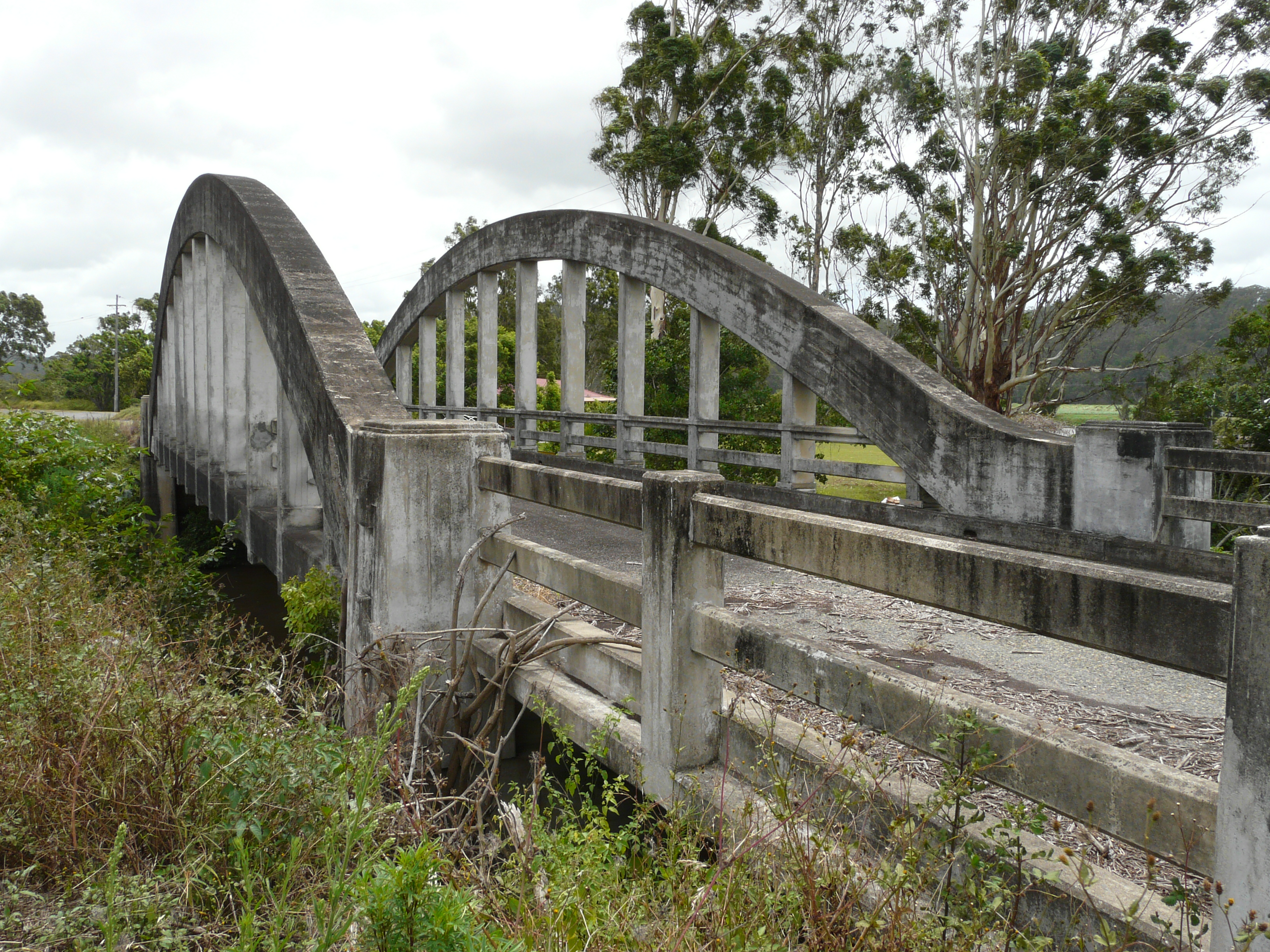
Shark Creek bridge near Maclean, formerly part of Pacific Highway

The passing of the Main Roads Act of 1924 through the Parliament of New South Wales provided for the declaration of Main Roads, roads partially funded by the State government through the Main Roads Board (later the Department of Main Roads, and eventually Transport for NSW). Great Northern Highway was declared (as Main Road No. 9), running from North Sydney via Hornsby, Peat's Ferry, Gosford, Swansea and Newcastle to Hexham (still under construction), and North Coast Highway was declared (as Main Road No. 10), running from Hexham, Stroud, Gloucester, Taree, Port Macquarie, Kempsey, Coffs Harbour, South Grafton, Ballina, Byron Bay, Mullumbimby, and Murwillumbah to Tweed Heads, on the same day, 8 August 1928. With the passing of the Main Roads (Amendment) Act of 1929 to provide for additional declarations of State Highways and Trunk Roads, these were amended to State Highways 9 and 10 on 8 April 1929.

In Queensland, there existed a series of local roads, which could be used by early motor vehicle owners to drive from Brisbane to the state border at Tweed Heads, but these roads were not designed for cars, and hence the journey was more like an adventure, only undertaken by the experienced motorist. The railway line to Southport and Tweed Heads was the preferred mode of transport. It wasn't until 1920 when Queensland's Main Roads Board was formed that the Main South Coast Road was declared. It was declared as the Pacific Highway in December 1930, although the final part of the highway (the Logan River bridge) wasn't opened until July of the next year. In New South Wales, a section of State Highway 9 (Great Northern Highway) from Hexham to Sydney, was re-declared as part of as State Highway 10; its entire length (including North Coast Highway from Hexham to the state border with Queensland, and the newly added section of Great Northern Highway) was renamed Pacific Highway to match Queensland's declaration on 26 May 1931; The Great Northern Highway was truncated to meet the Pacific Highway at Hexham (and was later renamed to New England Highway in 1933).

Until the 1990s most road freight between Sydney and Brisbane passed along the New England Highway instead, due to the easier topography of the Northern Tablelands it traverses. Between 1950 and 1967, traffic on Pacific Highway quadrupled due to the attraction of coastal towns between Sydney and Brisbane for retirement living and tourism.

=== 1989 Grafton and Kempsey bus crashes ===
Two major coach accidents on Pacific Highway in 1989 near Grafton (in which 21 people died) and at Clybucca near Kempsey (in which 35 people died) resulted in a public outcry over the poor quality of the road and its high fatality rate. Pacific Highway was never part of the federally funded system of National Highways. This appears to be because when the federal government funding of the 'national highway' system began in 1974, the longer New England Highway was chosen rather than Pacific Highway as the Sydney–Brisbane link, due to its easier topography and consequent lower upgrade costs.

=== 1990s ===
In 1994, the Roads and Traffic Authority considered the environmental impact statement of a proposal for a toll road between Coolongolook and Possum Brush. The proposal was from Snowy Mountains Engineering Corporation Ltd and Travers Morgan Pty Ltd.

Until December 1997, a short 3.5-kilometre (2.2 mi) section of the highway between Ourimbah and Kangy Angy was used by Sydney–Newcastle Freeway traffic as there was no freeway alternative. This section of Pacific Highway was designated as part of National Route 1 and subsequently National Highway 1. It was also upgraded to dual carriageway in the early 1970s. Due to the shared freeway and highway traffic, the at-grade interchanges between the freeway and the highway at Ourimbah and Kangy Angy became bottlenecks during peak times. In December 1997, the Ourimbah Creek Road to Kangy Angy stage of the freeway, located 150 m west of the highway, opened to traffic. The new freeway section was one of the last sections of the freeway to be completed and was referred to as the "missing link" of the freeway. Pacific Highway was bypassed and reduced to one lane per direction, and the northbound carriageway and bridge over Ourimbah Creek north of Palmdale Road were removed. The at-grade interchange between the freeway and the highway at Kangy Angy was also removed.

The section of the highway from Cowan to Kariong follows a scenic winding route with varying speed limits, typically 60 or 70 km/h (37 or 43 mph). This section was damaged quite severely during severe weather in June 2007. Five people died when a bridge over Piles Creek collapsed and the entire section was closed due to subsidence 2 km (1.2 mi) further south. The road was reopened in 2009 when the Holt-Bragg Bridge was opened, named after the family that had perished.

The New South Wales section of Pacific Highway from Brunswick Heads to the state border with Queensland was re-declared as part of Pacific Motorway in February 2013.

The passing of the Roads Act of 1993 through the Parliament of New South Wales updated road classifications and the way they could be declared within New South Wales. Under this Act, Pacific Highway today retains its declaration as Highway 10, across all four of its gazetted sections, from the state border with Queensland (via Pacific Motorway) to North Sydney.

=== 2000s and beyond ===
Pacific Highway was signed National Route 1 across its entire length in 1955. With the conversion to the newer alphanumeric system in 2013, this was replaced with route M1 for sections classified as a motorway, and route A1 for sections classified as a highway (except between Hexham and Wahroonga, where it is designated route A43 through most of the Central Coast between Hexham and Doyalson, and route B83 between Kariong and Wahroonga).

=== 1996 upgrade masterplan ===
==== Four lane dual carriageway standard ====
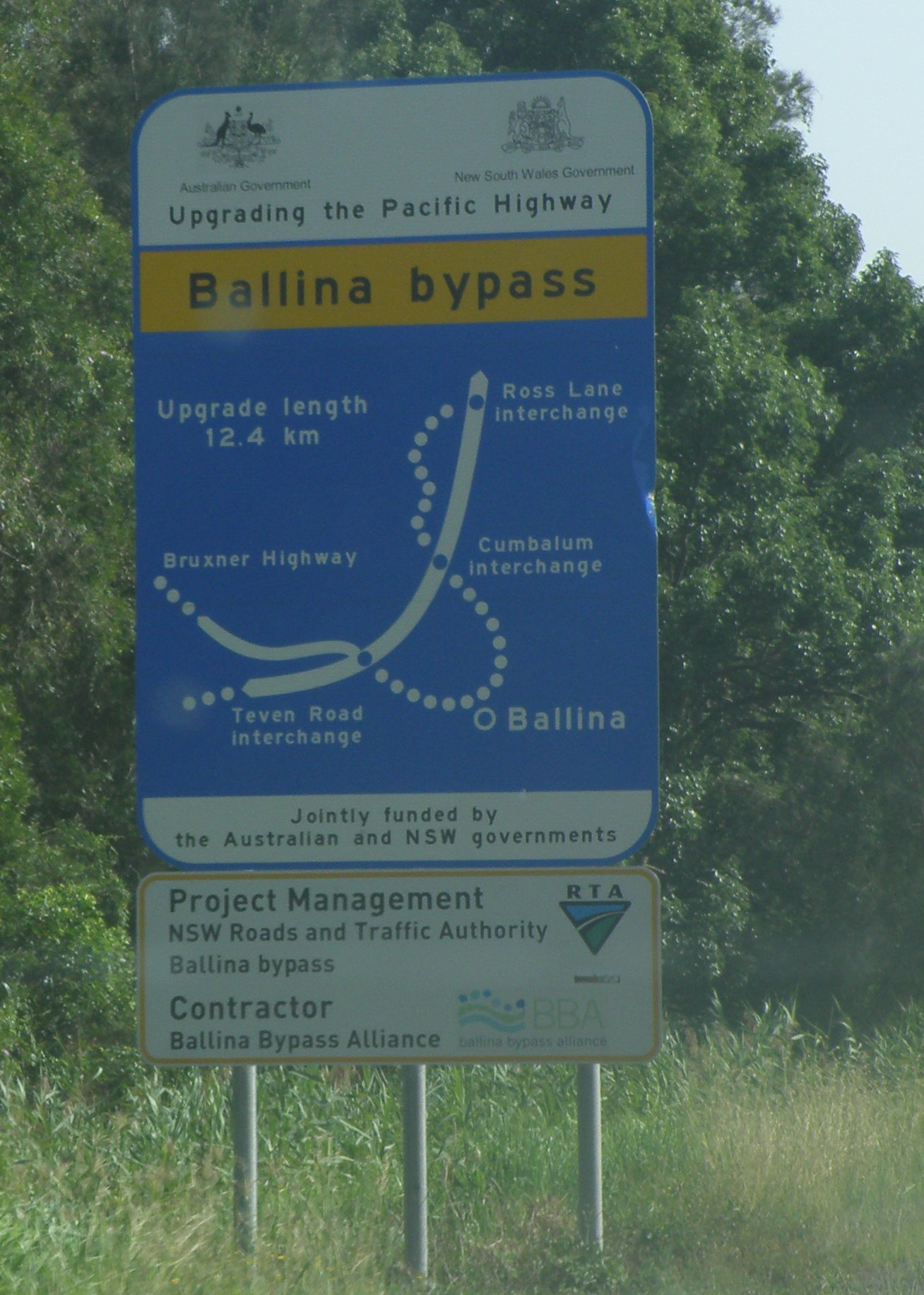
A 2009 project sign for the Ballina Bypass, subsequently completed.

The highway was heavily used by interstate traffic and its upgrade was beyond the resources of the New South Wales government alone. The NSW and federal governments argued for years about how the responsibility for funding the highway's upgrade should be divided between themselves, only coming up with a mutually acceptable upgrade package just after the 1996/97 financial year.

As part of a joint New South Wales and federal funding arrangement and upgrade masterplan, single carriageway sections from Tweed Heads to Hexham were progressively converted to freeway or dual carriageway standards commencing in 1996. At the time, the plan targeted to have Pacific Highway upgraded to dual carriageway by 2016. The strategy divided the remaining sections into three levels of priority:

- Priority 1: Tweed Heads to Ballina, Port Macquarie to Hexham, Woolgoolga to Raleigh
- Priority 2: Raleigh to Port Macquarie
- Priority 3: Ballina to Woolgoolga

In the meantime, numerous sections of existing single carriageway road were upgraded by re-alignments and safety improvement work including the addition of overtaking lanes, pavement widening and median barriers. Overall the highway became safer and travelling times were substantially reduced, particularly during holiday periods..

The four-lane dual carriageway upgrade of the highway was completed in December 2020. Continuous dual carriageway, much of it freeway standard, now extends from Mayfield West in Newcastle to the Queensland border. As of completion, about A$15 billion have been invested in the upgrade by the federal and state governments, and fatalities have dropped by more than 75% since the upgrade started in 1996.

Additionally, the M1 to Raymond Terrace project extended and connected the Pacific Motorway (Sydney to Newcastle section) to the upgraded Pacific Highway at Raymond Terrace. Construction formally commenced in January 2024 and was completed on 11 September 2026.

Four lane dual carriageway upgrade
Section	Total length (km)		Completion date
Section	Before Upgrade	After Upgrade	Completion date
Tweed Heads to Ballina (Bruxner Highway) including part of Pacific Motorway	90.5	91	December 2015
Ballina to Coffs Harbour	206.5	204	December 2020
Coffs Harbour to Port Macquarie (Oxley Highway)	151	145	June 2018
Port Macquarie to Mayfield West (Newcastle)	221	217	2013
Totals	666	657	December 2020

==== Coffs Harbour Bypass ====
The Coffs Harbour Bypass is a 14-kilometre (8.7 mi) realignment of Pacific Highway that will bypass the city of Coffs Harbour, including up to 12 sets of traffic lights. It is being built as a four-lane motorway with three tunnels. It is the last section of the Pacific Highway Upgrade, and is being funded by the state and federal governments. The project was granted planning approval by the state government in November 2020 and the federal government in December 2020. Tenders for its construction were let in June 2022, with major construction commencing in early 2023. It is expected to be open to traffic in late 2026.

==== Motorway standard upgrade ====
The highway was upgraded to dual carriageway that is either an arterial standard (Class A) or a motorway standard (Class M). The Class M sections between Woolgoolga and Ballina are:

- Thrumster to Eungai Rail
- Congarinni to Boambee
- Woolgoolga to Halfway Creek
- Glenugie to Harwood
- Woodburn to Pimlico

Following the dual carriageway upgrade, the only remaining project of the Pacific Highway Upgrade is the Coffs Harbour Bypass.

==== Projects ====
List of projects on Pacific Highway
Project	Length (km)	Construction dates		Value	Status	Description	Distance from Sydney (km)
Project	Length (km)	Start	End	Value	Status	Description	Distance from Sydney (km)
Ballina to border
Tugun Bypass	7	June 2006	3 June 2008	$543 million	Complete	Part of the Pacific Motorway, partly in Queensland. Upgrade not part of the program. Funded by the Queensland Government and Federal Government	823
Banora Point	2.5	December 2009	22 September 2012	$359 million	Complete	Part of the Pacific Motorway	817
Chinderah bypass	5.8	1993	29 November 1996	$67 million	Complete	Part of the Pacific Motorway	812
Yelgun to Chinderah	28.6	May 2000	6 August 2002	$348 million	Complete	Part of the Pacific Motorway, includes 3 interchanges	784
Brunswick Heads Bypass (stage 1)	3.4	12 September 1996	5 June 1998	$17 million	Complete	Part of the Pacific Motorway, first 2 lanes	774
Brunswick Heads to Yelgun	8.6	July 2005	11 July 2007	$219 million	Complete	Part of the Pacific Motorway, duplication	777
Tandy's Lane realignment	5.5	October 1999	19 December 2001	$44 million	Complete	Part of the Pacific Motorway	773
Ewingsdale to Tyagarah realignment	4.3	Late 1996	16 October 1998	$22 million	Complete	Part of the Pacific Motorway	765
Ewingsdale interchange	1.9	February 1999	20 December 2000	$22.5 million	Complete	Part of the Pacific Motorway	764
Tintenbar to Ewingsdale	17	May 2012	18 December 2015	$862 million	Complete	Four lane motorway (limited access), new alignment, 110 km/h speed limit, twin-tube road tunnel under St Helena Hill.	749
Ballina Bypass	12	May 2008	March 2011 (Cumbalum Interchange to Ross Lane Interchange); 29 November 2011 (Teven Road to Cumbalum Interchange); 20 December 2011 (southbound lanes from Teven Road to Bruxner Highway); 11 February 2012 (northbound lanes from Teven Road to Bruxner Highway); 28 April 2012 (Pacific Highway to the Bruxner Highway)	$640 million	Complete	New alignment	737
Woolgoolga to Ballina
Pimlico to Ballina Bypass	6		December 2019		Complete	Duplication of existing highway. New bridge over Emigrant Creek	
Pimlico to Teven	2.3	November 2013	5 May 2016	$92 million	Stage 2 complete	Duplication, rebuilding of old carriageway, stage 3 completed in December 2019 as part of Woolgoolga to Ballina project	733
Woodburn to Pimlico	34		17 September 2020		Complete	New alignment, bypasses Woodburn, Wardell, and Broadwater. Bridge over the Richmond River at Wardell was the last bridge to open for the Pacific Highway Upgrade	
Devils Pulpit to Woodburn	15		11 December 2020		Complete	Duplication of existing highway	
Devils Pulpit	7.3	December 2011	20 March 2014	$77 million	Complete	Four lanes, partly new alignment	678
Mororo to Devils Pulpit	15		27 August 2020		Complete	Duplication of existing highway	
Maclean to Mororo	9		22 September 2020		Complete	Duplication of existing highway. New bridge over the Clarence River at Harwood opened 6 December 2019	
Tyndale to Maclean	12		1 April 2020		Complete	New alignment. Maclean Interchange fully opened on 5 August 2020.	
Glenugie to Tyndale	36		19 May 2020		Complete	Four lane divided highway, new alignment, also known as Grafton Bypass. Old bypassed alignment renamed Big River Way	
Glenugie upgrade	2.5	2010	9 February 2012	$60 million	Complete	Four lanes, new alignment for southbound traffic. New northbound carriageway opened adjacent to southbound carriageway on 26 November 2020 as part of Woolgoolga to Ballina project	590
Wells Crossing to Glenugie	8		26 November 2020		Complete	New two-lane alignment for northbound traffic, adjacent to the existing southbound carriageway that was built as part of Glenugie Upgrade	
Halfway Creek to Glenugie	12		23 August 2017		Complete	Duplication of existing highway between Grays Road and Franklin Road (Glenugie upgrade)	
Halfway Creek	3.4	Late 2002	June 2004	TBA	Complete	Partly new alignment.	583
Woolgoolga to Halfway Creek	14	July 2015	December 2017		Complete	Duplication of existing highway, partly new alignment. 10 km Corindi Beach bypass opened to traffic on 24 October 2017. Old bypassed alignment renamed Solitary Islands Way	561
Sapphire to Woolgoolga	25	August 2010	30 July 2014	$850 million	Complete	Four lane divided highway, partly new alignment, 10 km Woolgoolga bypass opened to traffic on 16 December 2013. Old bypassed alignment renamed Solitary Islands Way	535
Korora Hill Reconstruction	1.5	January 1997	15 December 1997	$6 million	Complete	Duplication and reconstruction	533
Coffs Harbour
Coffs Harbour Bypass	12	2021	2024	$1.2 billion	Construction	four lane freeway with 3 interchanges, new alignment, 2 tunnels and a cut and cover tunnel	524
Port Macquarie to Coffs Harbour
Lyons Rd to Englands Rd	5.3	October 1997	25 May 2001	$73m	Complete	Duplication and reconstruction	520
Bonville upgrade	9.6	November 2006	16 September 2008	$245m	Complete	Duplication and reconstruction, covered tunnel for koalas	514
Raleigh Deviation	8	January 1995	24 September 1998	$72m	Complete	Duplication and reconstruction	506
Nambucca Heads to Urunga	22	November 2013	22 July 2016	$780 million	Complete	Four lane limited access motorway, 110 km/h, 3 interchanges, bypasses Urunga. Old bypass alignment renamed Giinagay Way	484
Warrell Creek to Nambucca Heads	20	December 2014	18 December 2017 (Nambucca and Macksville bypass) Warrell Creek bypass opened 29 June 2018	$830 million	Complete	Four lane limited access motorway, 110 km/h, 2 interchanges, including bypasses of Warrell Creek, Macksville and Nambucca Heads. Old bypass alignment renamed Giinagay Way	464
Eungai Duplication	4.2	January 1998	March 1999	$15m	Complete	Duplication of first carriageway, which was opened on 23 February 1994	455
Frederickton to Eungai	26.5	August 2013	16 May 2016	$675 million	Complete	Four lane divided highway. Freeway from Stuarts Point interchange to South Kempsey. 110 km/h speed limit	427
Kempsey Bypass	14.5	June 2010	27 March 2013	$618 million	Complete	Dual carriageway motorway with 3.2 kilometres (2.0 mi) bridge over Macleay River, new alignment. Old bypassed alignment renamed Macleay Valley Way	413
Kundabung to Kempsey	14	November 2014	6 September 2017 (Opened to 2 lanes each way on 1 November 2017)	$230 million	Complete	Upgrade of current road to four lanes, partially limited-access (One lane opened in each carriageway. Other lanes are open end of October 2017)	398
Oxley Highway to Kundabung	23	October 2014	17 November 2017	$820 million	Complete	Four lane divided road (freeway south of Haydon's Wharf Road interchange), bridges over the Hastings and Wilson rivers, 2 interchanges, deep cutting through Cooperabung range.	373
Newcastle to Port Macquarie
Herons Creek Deviation Duplication	14	November 1997	3 July 1998	$19m	Complete	Duplication of the first carriageway, which was opened in 2 stages: the northern stage from Ryans Road to the Oxley Highway in December 1990 and the southern stage in November 1993.	359
Herons Creek to Stills Road Upgrade	3.5	March 2011	25 October 2013	$60m	Complete	Replacement of substandard carriageway (part of the old highway) to raise the road to freeway standard.	356
Coopernook to Herons Creek	33	November 2007	23 July 2010	$555m	Complete	Upgrade of highway to four lanes including a western bypass of Moorland, Johns River and an eastern bypass of Kew.	325
Coopernook Bypass	4.2	February 2004	22 March 2006	$44m	Complete	Four lane bypass.	321
Taree to Coopernook	7.5	November 2001	4 August 2005	$59m	Complete	Upgrade to four lanes, two new bridges over Ghinni Ghinni Creek and two cattle underpasses. Some upgrading, including four-lane sections had commenced in September 1996 and was completed in 1998.	312
Taree Bypass	14.5	July 1993 (first carriageway)	14 December 1997 (first carriageway); 12 April 2000 (second carriageway)	$126m	Complete	Four lane highway, new alignment	303
Possum Brush to Taree	17	1990	19 August 1991 (Possum Brush Deviation); 24 May 1994 (Rainbow Flat Deviation)	TBA	Complete	Four lane highway, old road used for northbound carriageway between Failford Road and Bonvale Close, planned to be replaced as part of Failford Road to Tritton Road upgrade	294
Failford Road to Tritton Road upgrade	3	TBA	TBA	TBA	In planning	New carriageway and interchange with Failford Road	293
Bundacree Creek to Possum Brush	9.7	September 2004	4 November 2006	$115m	Complete	Four lanes generally along old alignment, including upgrade of existing Nabiac bypass, new interchange and bridges.	277
Wang Wauk to Bundacree Creek	4.8	August 1997	10 December 1998	$21m	Complete	Four lanes generally along old alignment.	272
Coolongolook to Wang Wauk	11.7	December 1999	29 July 2001	$49m	Complete	Four lanes generally along old alignment, 80 km/h zone through Coolongolook.	263
Bulahdelah to Coolongolook	23	April 1997	27 October 1999	$130m	Complete	Four lanes freeway on new alignment. Replaces the original winding highway which is now called Wootton Way.	236
Bulahdelah upgrade	8.6	August 2010	27 June 2013	$315 million	Complete	Four lane highway, new alignment. Initial earthworks began in 2007.	232
Karuah to Bulahdelah	11 (section 1), 23 (section 2 and 3)	June 2005 (section 1) February 2007 (sections 2 and 3)	15 December 2006 (section 1), 2 October 2009 (sections 2 and 3)	$114m (section 1), – (sections 2 and 3)	Complete	Four lane highway (section 1 from Karuah to 2 kilometres (1.2 mi) north of Myall Way and sections 2 and 3 further north)	193
Karuah bypass	9.8	June 2002	22 September 2004	$117m	Complete	Four lane freeway, bridge over Karuah River and interchanges at either end.	187
Raymond Terrace to Karuah	18	August 1998	1 December 2000	$86m	Complete	Four lane highway, consisting of new 2-lane northbound carriageway and upgrade of old road as southbound carriageway	165
Raymond Terrace Bypass	7.6	November 1993	17 December 1998	$78m	Complete	Four lane freeway, including 1 interchange and pairs of bridges at three other places	162
Newcastle
M1 to Raymond Terrace	15	January 2024	11 September 2026	$2.24b	Complete	Four lane freeway connecting the M1 to Pacific Highway, four interchanges, 2.6 km bridge over the Hunter River, bypasses Hexham, Tarro and Beresfield while replacing the existing route through Heatherbrae	147

==== Funding issues ====
In 2007 mounting pressure was placed on the federal government to provide additional funding for the highway. On 10 October 2007 the Federal Minister for Transport and Regional Services pledged $2.4 billion in funding for the highway, subject to dollar for dollar funding by the NSW state government. However, the NSW state government refused to match funding. In the lead up to the 2007 federal election, then opposition leader Kevin Rudd pledged $1.5 billion in funding. As part of AusLink 2 (Nation Building Program), the federal government announced in its 2009 federal budget that $3.1 billion would be spent on the highway up until 2014 at which time just 63% of the highway would be duplicated. The NSW government will spend just $500 million over that same period, with $300 million cut as a result of the 2008 mini budget.

From time to time, there are proposals in the media for the private sector to build a fully controlled-access high-speed tollway between Newcastle and the Queensland border, possibly using the BOT system of infrastructure provision. Nothing eventuated from these proposals.

=== Other upgrades ===
Other sections of Pacific Highway (between Hexham and Sydney) have been upgraded or proposed to be upgraded:

- The section of Pacific Highway between Ourimbah Street and Parsons Road at Lisarow is being duplicated as of March 2021, including a rail bridge over the Sydney to Newcastle rail line.
- Work was carried out to widen the 6-kilometre (3.7 mi) section between Newcastle Inner City Bypass and New England Highway (Maitland Road) from four lanes to six lanes from December 2020. This work was completed in February 2026.

== Former route numbers ==
Pacific Highway was signed National Route 1 along its entire length in 1955. Over time, as road projects reallocated the route, or bypassed it entirely, these remaining sections were replaced with others. Former road routes of Pacific Highway have included:

- National Route 1 (1955–2013): Tweed Heads–Hexham
- National Route 1 (1955–1988) / State Route 111 (1988–2013): Hexham–Doyalson
- National Route 1 (1955–1979) / State Route 83 (1979–2013): Doyalson–Wahroonga
- National Route 1 (1955–1993) / Metroad 1 (1993–2013): Wahroonga–Artarmon
- National Route 1 (1955–1992) / State Route 14 (1992–1998) / Metroad 10 (1998–2007): Artarmon–Crows Nest
- National Route 1 (1955–1992): Crows Nest–North Sydney

== Safety ==
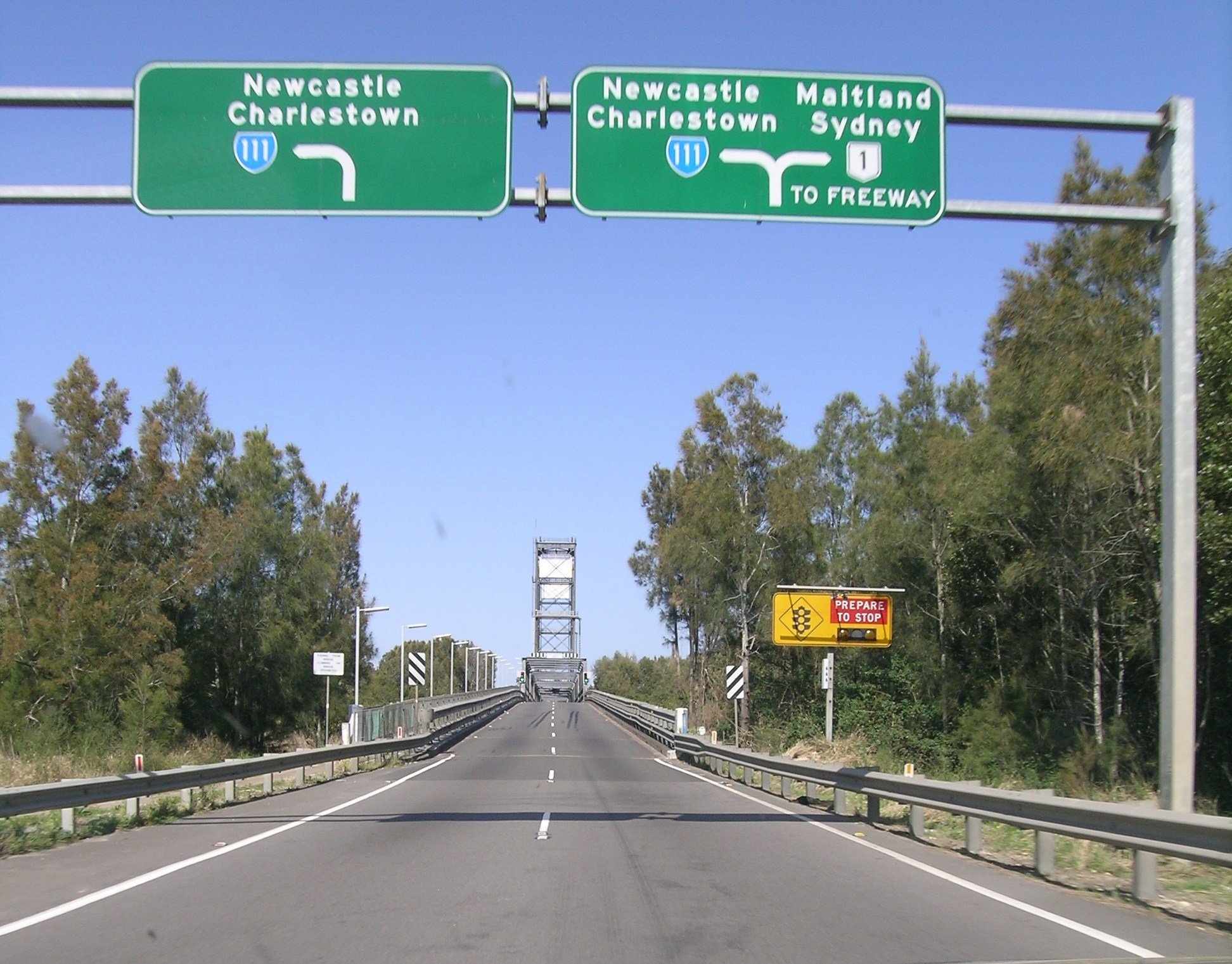
Hunter River bridge, Pacific Highway, Hexham, New South Wales is the largest of few surviving lift span bridges in NSW, still in working order.

The Pacific Highway was one of the most dangerous and deadly stretches of road in Australia, partly due to its high traffic levels. Between 1995 and 2009, over 400 people died on the highway. In 1989, two separate bus crashes, the Grafton bus crash (in which 21 people died) and the Kempsey bus crash (in which 35 died) on the highway were two of the worst road accidents in Australia's history. In 2010, 38 people died on Pacific Highway, and in 2011, 25 people. Over the past 15 years, the New South Wales Roads & Traffic Authority reports that about 1,200 people have been injured each year.

In January 2012, a ute swerved into the path of a B-double truck, which then veered off-road and crashed into two houses at Urunga. 11-year-old boy Max McGregor, who was sleeping in one of the houses, and the ute driver died from the incident. Another seven people were taken to Coffs Harbour Hospital. It was found that the ute driver had a blood alcohol concentration of 0.245, five times over the limit, equal to more than 25 standard drinks. The section of the highway through Urunga was bypassed in 2016.

Much of the danger of Pacific Highway lay in the fact that it contained long stretches of undivided road along which all types of vehicles, including private automobiles, buses, vans and trucks, simultaneously travelled at speeds approaching and in excess of 100 kilometres per hour (62 mph). The undivided sections carried a high risk of head-on collisions. This was relieved to an extent by the provision of regular passing lanes, but these did not fully cope with the high level of traffic during holiday periods. After the 1989 crashes, the investigating coroner, Kevin Waller, recommended that the highway be fully divided along its entire length. Motorists surveyed by the National Roads and Motorists' Association (NRMA) voted Pacific Highway the worst road in New South Wales in 2012.

== Major intersections ==
The major intersections of Pacific Highway, spread over 779 kilometres (484 mi) on the eastern seaboard of New South Wales comprise a mix of freeway grade-separated conditions, suburban and urban roads. Between Pacific Motorway at Brunswick Heads in the north, and the highway's southern terminus at Bradfield Highway and Cahill Expressway in North Sydney, major intersections include:

Ewingsdale Road (B62)
Bruxner Highway (B60)
Big River Way (B76) – towards Gwydir Highway
Big River Way (B91) – towards Summerland Way
Waterfall Way (B78)
Oxley Highway (B56)
New England Highway (A43)
Nelsons Bay Road (B63)
Parry Street (A15)
Newcastle Inner City Bypass (A37)
Sparks Road (B70)
Central Coast Highway (A49)
Motorway Link (A43)
Cumberland Highway (Pennant Hills Road) (A28)
Mona Vale Road / Ryde Road (A3)
Gore Hill Freeway (M1)
Lane Cove Tunnel (M2)
Gore Hill Freeway (M1)
Warringah Freeway (M1)

== See also ==
- Highways in Australia
- List of highways in New South Wales
- Major intersections of the Pacific Highway (Australia)
