= Grafton bus crash =

1989 bus crash in Australia

Coordinates: 29°34′06″S 153°05′12″E

Details
- Date: 20 October 1989; 04:00
- Location: Pacific Highway, Grafton, New South Wales
- Country: Australia
- Operator: Sunliner Express
- Cause: Truck driver fatigue, aggravated by narrow highway.

Statistics
- Vehicles: 2
- Passengers: 45
- Deaths: 21
- Injured: 32

The Grafton bus crash killed 21 people and injured 22 on the Pacific Highway near Grafton, Australia on 20 October 1989 when a semi-trailer truck collided with a Sunliner Express coach operating an express service from Sydney to Brisbane. At the time, it was the worst in Australian road transport history in terms of number of deaths. Two months later it was surpassed by the Kempsey bus crash that killed 35 passengers.

== Incident ==
At some time between 03:50 and 04:00 on 20 October 1989 a southbound semi-trailer truck carrying a load of tinned pineapple juice veered onto the wrong side of the road and collided with a Sunliner Express bus travelling the other way. The bus was carrying 45 passengers. The impact of the semi-trailer resulted in a penetration of the entire right side of the bus by the trailer, spilling passengers onto the road as well as causing trauma for passengers within the bus interior when it rolled.

The driver of the truck, who was among the dead, was found to have a high concentration of ephedrine in his blood, a stimulant similar in effect to the amphetamines. The concentration found was 80 times in excess of the normal therapeutic level, even for chronic users. It was subsequently found that the truck driver used ephedrine to stay awake and alert, a then-common usage by long-distance drivers.

== Coronial inquest ==
The inquest into the Grafton bus crash was conducted by means of two sets of hearings in early 1990. The first hearings established the specific causes of the crash, such as the narrow width of the highway (6 metres) at the site, and the fact both vehicles were travelling above the speed limit.

The second hearings examined matters relevant to road safety in Australia: speed limits on undivided highways; speed limiters in motor vehicles, particularly in heavy vehicles such as trucks and buses; drivers having multiple licences from different Australian jurisdictions; the transfer of driver and vehicle information among Australian states and territories; the collection, collation, analysis and reporting of road crash statistics; driver fatigue, including drowsiness and obstructive sleep apnoea; the regulation of driving hours for truck and bus drivers; drugged driving; aftermarket fitment of bullbars on motor vehicles; construction standards for buses and bus seats; the use of multi-combination heavy vehicles such as B-double trucks and road trains; mass and dimension standards for trucks; the use of radar detector devices to avoid police speed enforcement; road safety advertising and education; and general matters associated with road construction and national road transport and road freight policies.

== Aftermath ==
This accident and the Kempsey bus crash eight weeks later were described as "arguably Australia’s most catastrophic examples of high consequence/low probability incidents in the bus industry" in a bus safety discussion document. The response to these incidents was an effort in Australia, and particularly in New South Wales, to better regulate the heavy transport industry. This included banning "stay-awake" drugs, limiting uninterrupted driving time and mandating rest periods.

The design standards of long-distance buses and their safety equipment were also reviewed. The bus involved in the accident belonged to Sunliner Express. The coroner's report cleared the bus of any responsibility for the accident. The bus company was liquidated in 1991 and the owners later founded Transit Systems in 1995.

The crash also prompted a proposal to upgrade the Pacific Highway to a divided road all the way between Sydney and Brisbane. The section of the Pacific Highway where the collisions occurred was bypassed in May 2020 by a dual carriageway as part of the Pacific Highway upgrades, and is now named Big River Way. There is a memorial to the travellers involved in the Grafton Bus Disaster located on a now closed-off section of the old Pacific Highway at Cowper.
