= Urunga, New South Wales =

Urunga
- Town
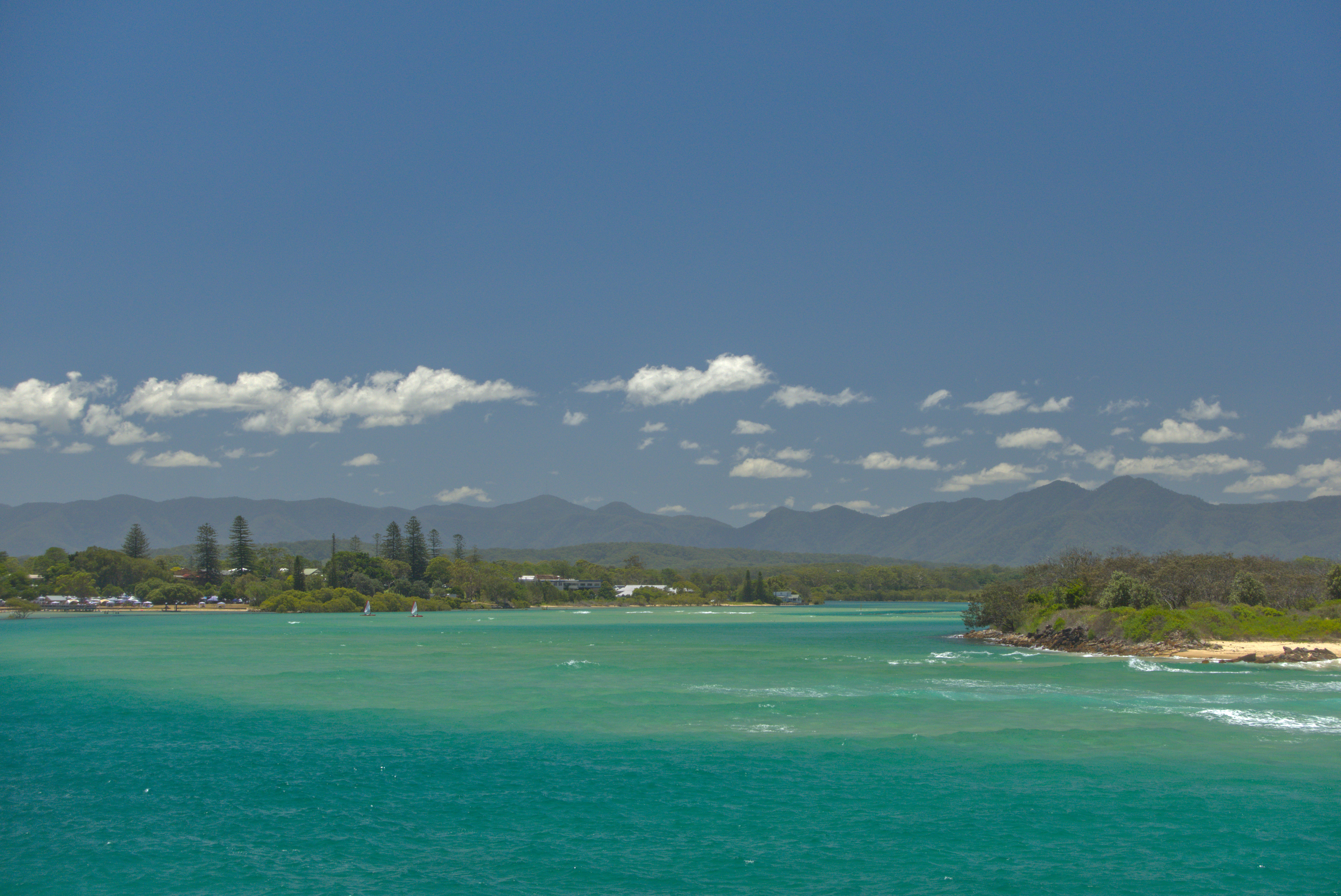
- Urunga Lagoon from the Boardwalk

- Coordinates: 30°30′0″S 153°01′0″E
- Country: Australia
- State: New South Wales
- LGA: Bellingen Shire
- Location: 505 km (314 mi) NNE of Sydney; 413 km (257 mi) S of Brisbane; 28 km (17 mi) S of Coffs Harbour; 16 km (9.9 mi) E of Bellingen; 20 km (12 mi) N of Nambucca Heads

Government
  - State electorate: Oxley
  - Federal division: Cowper
- Elevation: 7 m (23 ft)

Population
  - Total: 3,185 (2021 census)
- Postcode: 2455

Urunga (/juːˈrʌnɡə/ yoo-RUN-gə) is a small town located within the Mid North Coast region of New South Wales, Australia, in Bellingen Shire. It is famous for its surf spots (reefs, beaches and mouth of two rivers). At the 2021 census, Urunga had a population of 3,185. The town is south of Coffs Harbour and Sawtell and north of Nambucca Heads. The place name is derived from the Gumbaynggir word Yurūnga (pronounced Yu-roon-ga), which is derived from the word for long yurūn in reference to "long white sands".

== Geography ==
There are two main streets, and both a bowling club and a golf club. A weekly 6-a-side soccer competition is held on Thursdays at the Oval on Morgo Street, colloquially known as the Cabbage Patch or simply 'The Patch'.

== History ==
Urunga is a fishing ground, with bream being the main sport fish. The Urunga boardwalk, leading over the tidal Urunga Lagoon then out to the beach, was rebuilt in 1988 and extended in 1991. The full boardwalk was completed in 2007. In November 2010, a further section of boardwalk was completed. This extension finishes at the mouth of the river and has taken the length of the boardwalk to almost one kilometre (0.62 mi). Hungry Head, four kilometres (2.5 mi) to the south is the only patrolled beach in Urunga.

On 8 December 2017, the Federal Court of Australia determined that the Gumbaynggirr People have native title rights and interests over an area of land and waters at Wenonah Head, near Urunga. This determination resolved the oldest native title claim in New South Wales.

Historical population
Year	Pop.	±%
1966	924	—
1976	1,207	+30.6%
1976	1,609	+33.3%
1981	2,045	+27.1%
1986	2,336	+14.2%
1991	2,666	+14.1%
1996	2,716	+1.9%
2001	2,706	−0.4%
2006	2,687	−0.7%
2011	2,523	−6.1%
2016	2,599	+3.0%
2021	2,731	+5.1%
Source: Australian Bureau of Statistics data.

== Culture ==
Urunga celebrates Father's Day with a "Picnic in the Park" in September and a Flathead fishing comp in November.

== Education ==
- Urunga Public School
- Stepping Stones preschool

== Transport ==
Urunga railway station opened on the North Coast line in 1923 and continues to be served by country passenger trains.

== Urunga Wetlands ==
In May 2017 the Urunga Wetlands were opened to the public. It features a wheelchair accessible 150-metre boardwalk and a 450-metre walking track surrounding the park. In the late 1960s and early 1970s the area was the site of a processing plant used for extracting the heavy metal antimony from its ore, stibnite. Antimony and other heavy metals leached into the surrounding melaleuca wetlands creating what was claimed to be "one of the most polluted natural environments in New South Wales." In 2015 a $10 million reclamation project began that involved treating over 36,000 tonnes of contaminated soils at the site and its storage in an onsite containment cell. Water quality of the wetlands has returned to acceptable levels and birds and other wildlife have started to return since completion of the project.

== Gallery ==
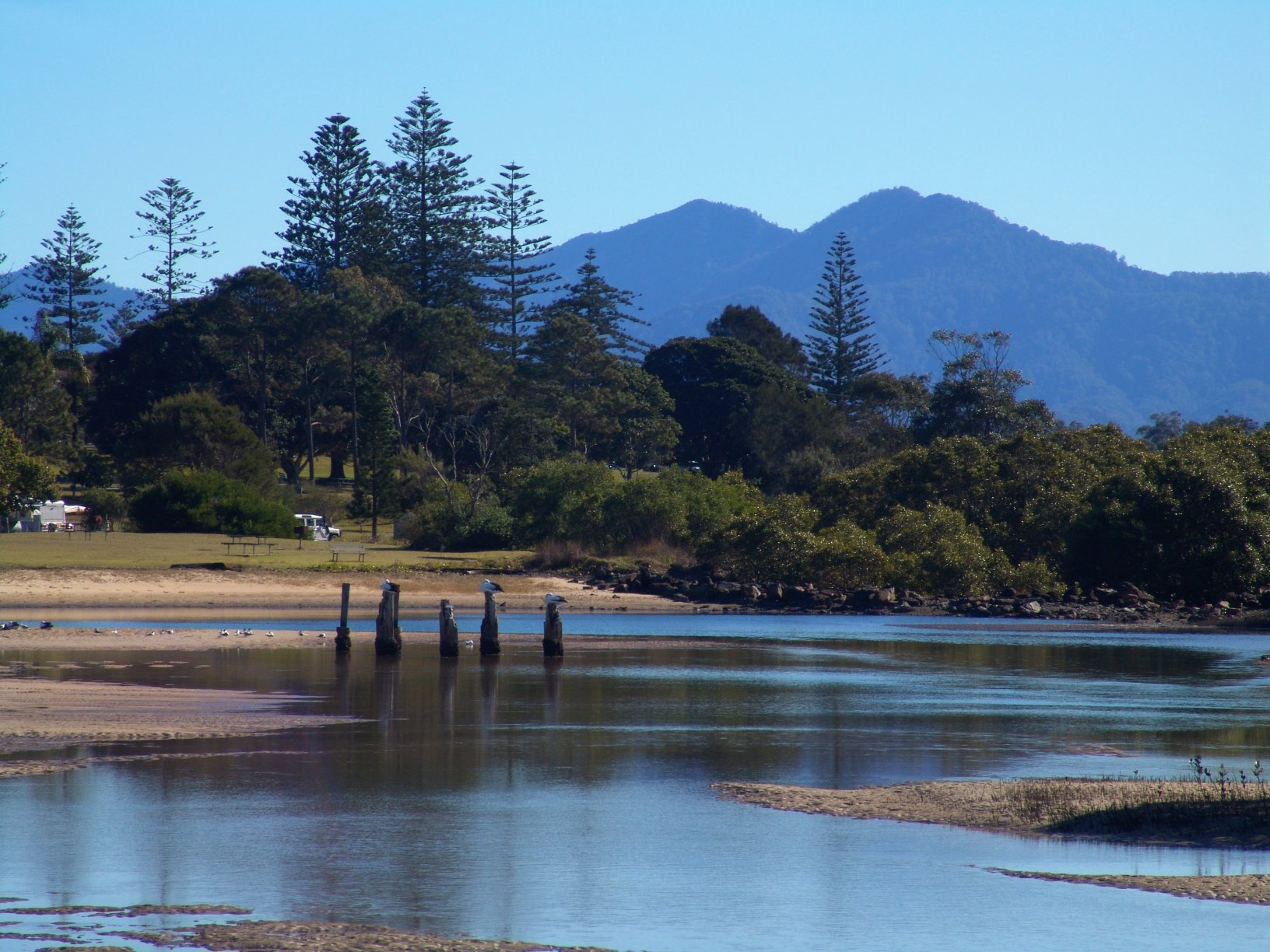

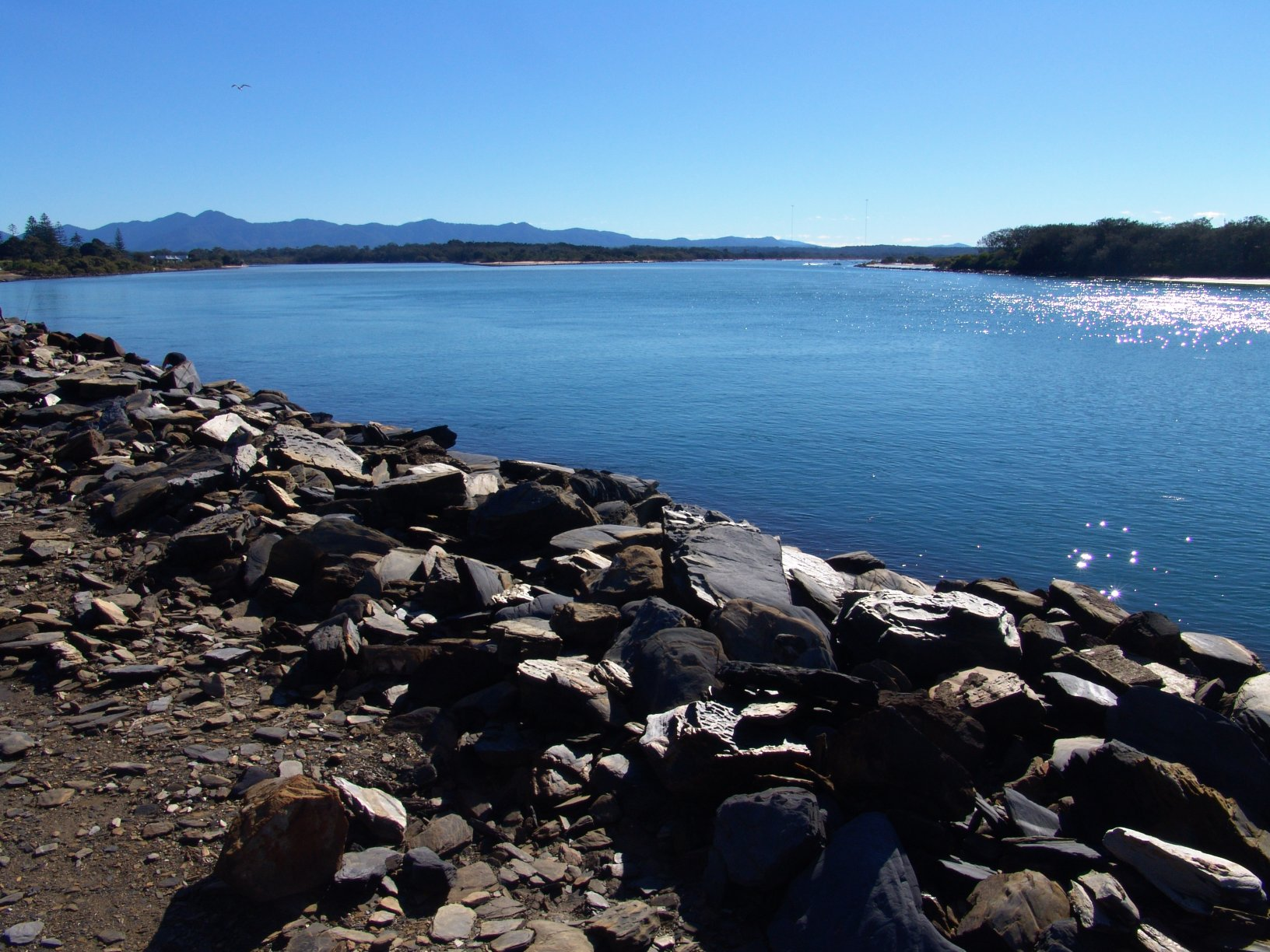

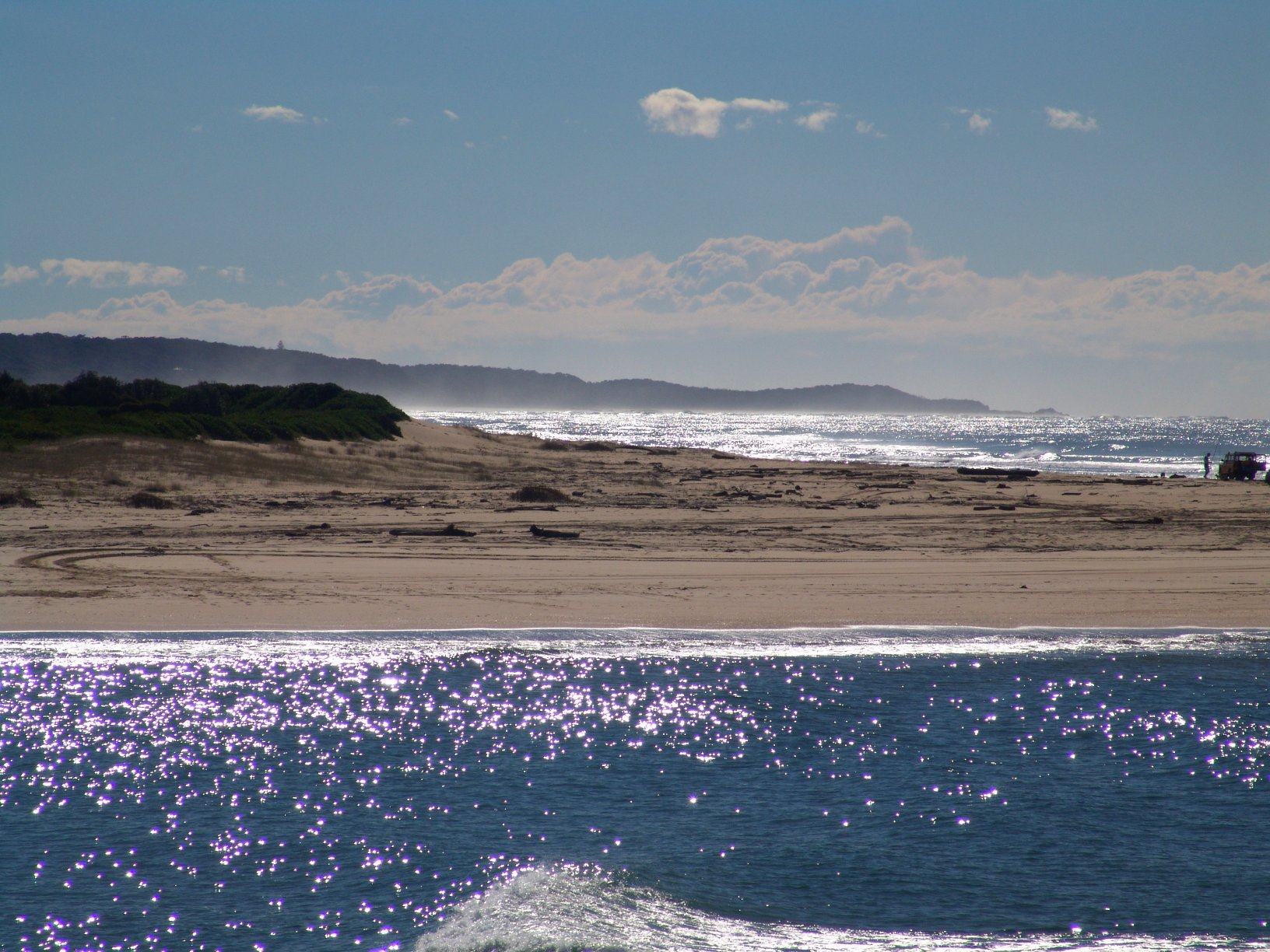

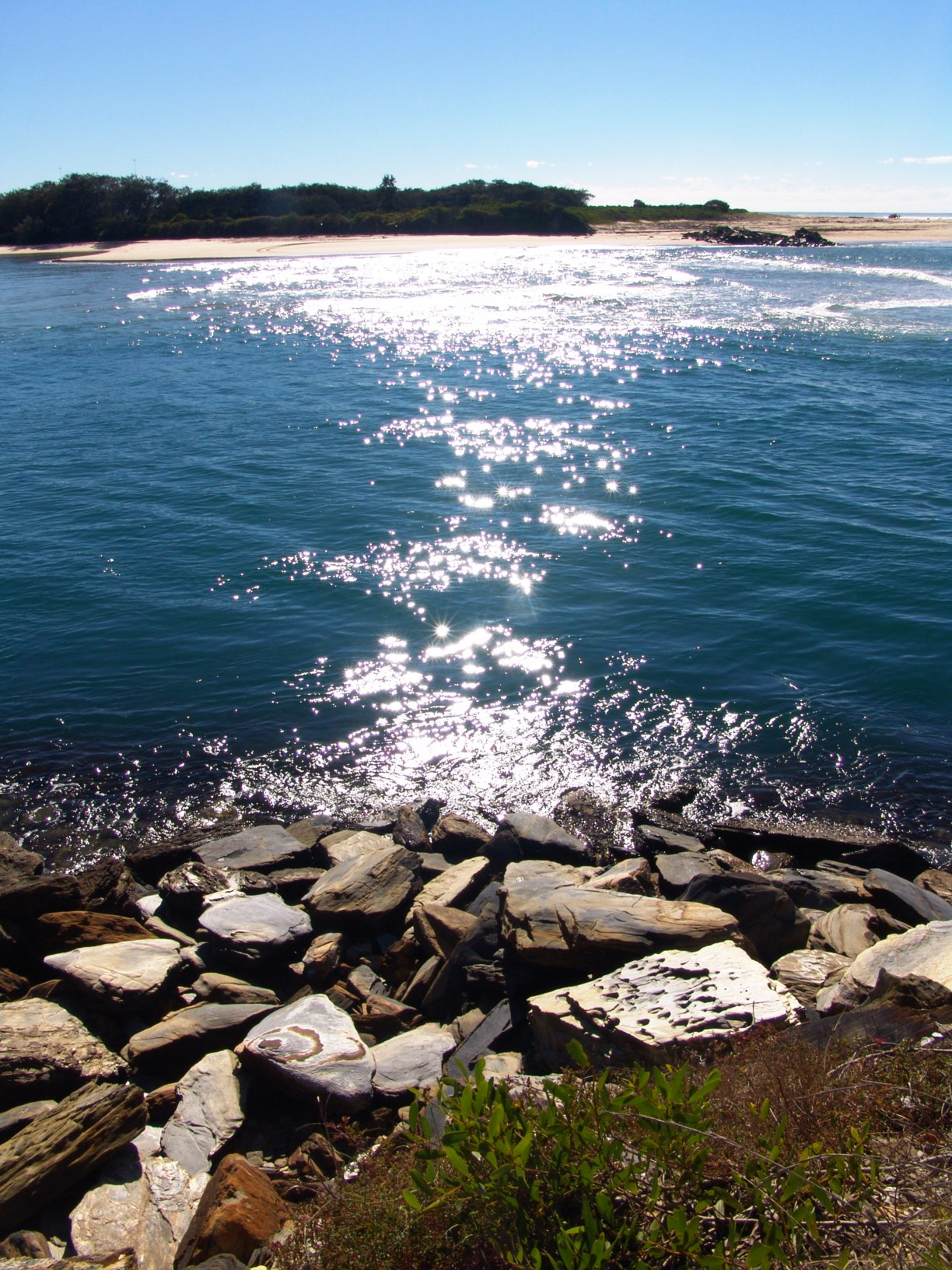
