= Yaygir =

Yaygir may be,

- Yaygir people
- Yaygir language
