= Boonoo Boonoo, New South Wales =

Locality in New South Wales, Australia

Coordinates: 28°53′05″S 152°06′20″E

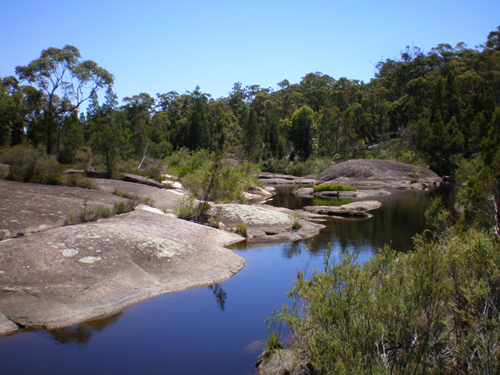
Boonoo Boonoo River in 2010

Boonoo Boonoo is a locality in New South Wales, Australia.

== Location ==
Boonoo Boonoo is located within the Tenterfield Shire and lies approximately 26 kilometres north of Tenterfield along the Mount Lindesay Road. The locality is approximately 10 kilometres south-east of the Queensland-New South Wales border. Nearby national parks include Bald Rock National Park and Basket Swamp National Park.

== Geography ==
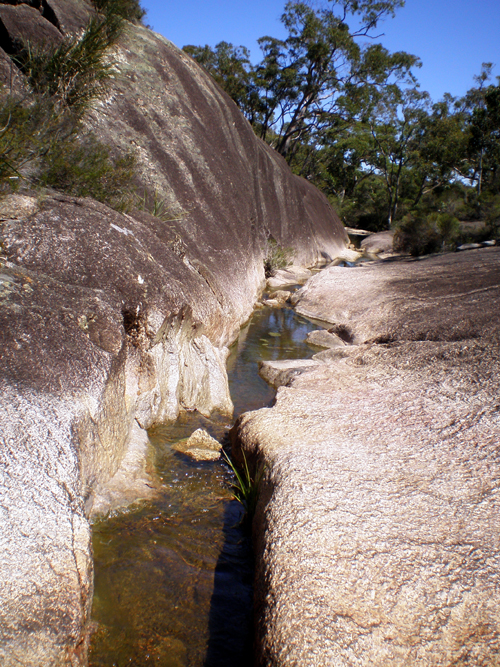
Morgans Gully, Boonoo Boonoo NP.

The etymology of Boonoo Boonoo is Aboriginal for "poor country with no animals to provide food" and is pronounced 'bunna bunoo'. The local geography is dominated by prominent granite inselbergs and mountains, a fine example being that of the nearby Bald Rock, the largest granite inselberg in Australia, which is located within Bald Rock National Park. The average elevation throughout the area differs from below 600 metres to over 1,100 metres.

The main geographic features in the locality are Boonoo Boonoo National Park, Boonoo Boonoo River and Falls, Basket Swamp National Park, Bald Rock National Park and Mount Lindesay Road.

== History ==
Gold was discovered in the district in 1858, and the economy today is mainly beef cattle breeding and superfine wool production through the breeding of Merino sheep.

== See also ==
- List of reduplicated Australian place names
