= Summerland Way =

Highway in New South Wales

Summerland Way New South Wales
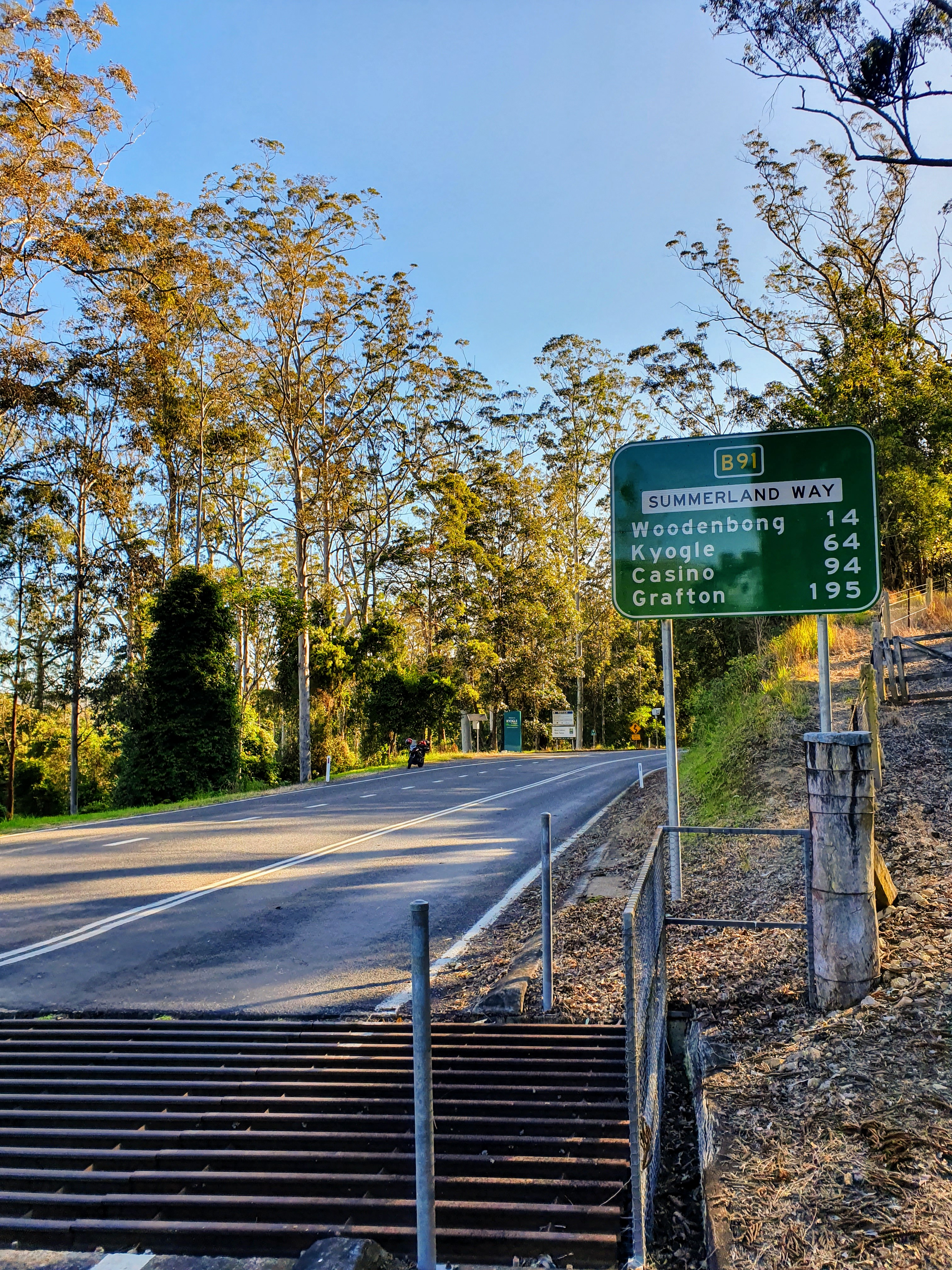
- Summerland Way's northern end at the NSW/QLD border
- Coordinates: 28.336946°S 152.700625°E (North end); 29.704902°S 152.943642°E (South end)

General information
- Type: Rural road
- Length: 199 km (124 mi)
- Gazetted: August 1928
- Route number(s): B91 (2013–present)
- Former route number: State Route 91 (1974–2013)

Major junctions
- North end: Mount Lindesay Highway; NSW/QLD border
- Bruxner Highway
- South end: Big River Way; South Grafton, New South Wales

Location(s)
- Major settlements: Kyogle, Casino, Grafton

Summerland Way is a 199–kilometre state route, designated B91, in New South Wales. It runs generally north from Grafton to the state border with Queensland just west of Mount Lindesay, and continues from there into Queensland as Mount Lindesay Highway. It was named as the region in runs through is a popular tourist area for people during summer.

Summerland Way is an alternative route to Pacific Highway. It is sealed for its entire length, although some of the road north of Lions Road turn-off is narrow and winding.

== Route ==
Summerland Way starts south of the Queensland border to Woodenbong, then heads in a southerly direction through Kyolge, Casino, and Whiporie to eventually reach Grafton on the Clarence River.

Summerland Way crossed the river over the original Grafton Bridge, but now does so over the Balun Bindarray Bridge since its opening in 2019.

== History ==
The passing of the Main Roads Act of 1924 through the Parliament of New South Wales provided for the declaration of Main Roads, roads partially funded by the State government through the Main Roads Board (MRB, later Transport for NSW). Great Northern Highway was declared (as Main Road No. 9) from near Woodenbong to the state border with Queensland (and continuing southwest via Tenterfield, Glen Innes, Tamworth, Singleton, Newcastle, Gosford, Peat's Ferry and Hornsby to North Sydney), Main Road No. 140 was declared from the intersection with Great Northern Highway near Woodenbong, via Kyogle to the intersection with Tenterfield-Lismore Road (today Bruxner Highway) at Casino, and Main Road No. 151 was declared from Casino via Myrtle Creek to the intersection with Gwydir Highway at South Grafton, on the same day, 8 August 1928. With the passing of the Main Roads (Amendment) Act of 1929 to provide for additional declarations of State Highways and Trunk Roads, these were amended to State Highway 9 and Main Roads 140 and 151 on 8 April 1929. Great Northern Highway was renamed New England Highway through New South Wales on 14 March 1933 (continuing southwest via Tenterfield, Glen Innes, Tamworth and Singleton to Hexham). The southern end of Main Road 151 was later extended from South Grafton via Glenreagh to the jetty at Coffs Harbour on 16 March 1938. Trunk Road 83 was declared on 20 July 1949, from the intersection with New England Highway near Woodenbong, via Kyogle, Casino, Myrtle Creek and Grafton to the intersection with Gwydir Highway in South Grafton, subsuming Main Road 140 and the alignment of Main Road 151 between Casino and South Grafton; Main Road 151 was truncated at South Grafton as a result.

New England Highway was re-routed through Warwick and Cunninghams Gap in Queensland on 11 August 1954. Against the wishes of the Beaudesert Shire Council and the Woodenbong Chamber of Commerce, the former alignment of New England Highway from Tenterfield through Beaudesert to Brisbane was re-declared Mount Lindesay Highway, after Mount Lindesay, the residue of a solidified magma core, that is part of the Mount Warning volcanic area and is situated in the western extreme of Border Ranges National Park. The Department of Main Roads (which had succeeded the MRB in 1932), declared the New South Wales section as State Highway 24, from Woodenbong to the state border with Queensland (and continuing southwest via Legume to Tenterfield).

Trunk Road 83 was officially named Summerland Way on 10 April 1974.

The New South Wales section of Mount Lindesay Highway, which still included unsealed portions, was eventually de-gazetted as a highway by the Department of Main Roads on 23 December 1981 due to very low traffic volumes, it was renamed Mount Lindesay Road and re-declared as Main Road 622. Summerland Way was consequently extended north 9.4 km along the alignment of the former highway to meet the Queensland end of Mount Lindesay Highway at the state border, and the eastern end of Mount Lindesay Road was truncated at the intersection with Summerland Way just east of Woodenbong.

The passing of the Roads Act of 1993 updated road classifications and the way they could be declared within New South Wales. Under this act, when Pacific Highway's Grafton bypass opened in May 2020, Summerland Way (as Main Road 83) was officially extended south along the old alignment of Pacific Highway on 5 July 2022, although the road is known locally and sign-posted as Big River Way. Summerland Way today, as part of Main Road 83, still retains this declaration.

In 1996, the Federal Government committed $20 million toward upgrading the Summerland Way. A $7 million contract to realign 1.2 km at Dourrigan's Gap, approximately 16 km north of Kyogle, was awarded, with work starting in February 2002 and expected to take 12 months to complete.

Summerland Way was signed State Route 91 across its entire length in 1974. With the conversion to the newer alphanumeric system in 2013, this was replaced with route B91.

=== Grafton ===
European settlement along the Clarence River had reached the area where Grafton now stands in the 1830s, with a store and shipyard being established at South Grafton in 1839. By the early 1840s there was a wharf, a store and an inn on the northern bank of the river.

Prior to 1861, when a punt service began operating on the river, the only way to cross was by rowboat. A steam-driven vehicular ferry began operating in the mid-1860s. This increased the need for a reliable road to areas north of Grafton.

By 1905 the Casino to North Grafton section of the North Coast railway line had been completed, but there was no rail connection to the south until 1915, when the North Coast railway line reached South Grafton and services were connected by a rail ferry that transported railcars across the river.

In 1932, a bridge across the Clarence River with a unique design of two storeys with the railway running underneath the road, known as Grafton Bridge, was opened. This led to a further increase in motor vehicle traffic to the north, and to a need for road improvements.

In December 2019, the New Grafton Bridge (now Balun Bindarray Bridge) opened and runs parallel to the original bridge. Summerland Way was permanently rerouted via Villers Street, Pound Street and Shirley Adams Way over the Balun Bindarray Bridge, and no longer runs along Prince, Fitzroy, Craig and Bent Streets. The new route bypasses the Grafton city centre and avoids the low 3.5m clearance rail bridge over Prince Street. When the Pacific Highway through Grafton was bypassed in May 2020, the B91 route (but not Summerland Way) was further extended along the old Pacific Highway (now Big River Way) and interchange with Pacific Highway at Glenugie.

=== Mount Lindesay ===
In 1928, Great Northern Highway was declared, although part of it had not yet been built. Construction of the “missing link” between Woodenbong and Mount Lindesay was completed in 1929, and a section west of Woodenbong was reconstructed by 1934, by which time it had been renamed the New England Highway.

In 1935 the Summerland Way was constructed between Casino and the recently completed New England Highway. During World War II the road was improved as an inland, flood-free route to Brisbane which avoided the major ferry crossing on the Pacific Highway of the south channel of the Clarence River at Harwood (the north channel had been bridged at Mororo in 1935).

=== Kyogle ===
In the 1830s a huge property, known as “Richmond Head”, was established in the upper Richmond River valley. The area around what is now Kyogle was settled throughout the 1840s and 1850s, but the name “Kyogle” was not used before 1899. In the 1860s cedar cutters arrived and for the next thirty years tree felling and sawmilling were the district's most important industries. These industries made roads to where they worked, substantially contributing to the road network of the district.

Road access from Casino was facilitated by the opening of the bridge at Casino in 1876. The road was the only means of travel to Casino until 1910, when the railway reached Kyogle.

=== Casino ===
European settlement along the Richmond River had reached the area where Casino now stands in the early 1850s, when a village known as “The Falls” was established on the northern side. In 1876 a bridge across the Richmond River to the settlement was completed, enabling road access from Grafton in the south and on to Kyogle in the north. The road was the only means of travel to Grafton until 1905, when the railway reached the town.

== Major intersections ==
State	LGA	Location	km	mi	Destinations	Notes
Queensland	Scenic Rim	Mount Lindesay–Mount Barney boundary	0.0	0.0	Mount Lindesay Highway (National Route 13) – Rathdowney, Beaudesert, Brisbane	Southern terminus of Mount Lindesay Highway and National Route 13
State border			0.0	0.0	Queensland – New South Wales state border	
New South Wales	Kyogle	Lindesay Creek–Dairy Flat boundary	0.0	0.0	Summerland Way (B91)	Northern terminus of Summerland Way and route B91
New South Wales	Kyogle	Lindesay Creek–Dairy Flat boundary	9.4	5.8	Mount Lindesay Road – Woodenbong, Tenterfield	T-intersection
New South Wales	Kyogle	The Risk	45.3	28.1	Gradys Creek Road, to Lions Road – Loadstone, Rathdowney	
New South Wales	Richmond River		49.6	30.8	Jenny Constable Bridge; Road follows upper reaches of Richmond River, crossing it five more times	
New South Wales	Kyogle	Wiangaree	51.3	31.9	North Coast railway line	
New South Wales	Kyogle	Kilgra	55.8	34.7	North Coast railway line	
New South Wales	Kyogle	Kyogle	63.5	39.5	North Coast railway line	
New South Wales	Kyogle	Kyogle	64.0	39.8	Kyogle Road – Murwillumbah	
New South Wales	Kyogle	Kyogle	65.5	40.7	North Coast railway line	
New South Wales	Richmond Valley	Casino	90.0	55.9	North Coast railway line	
New South Wales	Richmond Valley	Casino	93.8	58.3	Murwillumbah railway line	
New South Wales	Richmond Valley	Casino	94.2	58.5	West Street (south) – Casino	T junction
New South Wales	Richmond Valley	Casino	94.4	58.7	Johnson Street (Bruxner Highway) (B60 east) – Lismore; Centre Street (north) – Casino, Ballina	Northern terminus of concurrency with route B60 at roundabout
New South Wales	Richmond River		95.5	59.3	Irving Bridge	
New South Wales	Richmond Valley	Casino	95.9	59.6	Hare Street (Bruxner Highway) (B60 west) – Mummulgum, Tenterfield; Hare Street (Casino-Coraki Road) (east) – Tatham, Coraki	Southern terminus of concurrency with route B60 at roundabout
New South Wales	Clarence Valley	Whiporie	148.9	92.5	North Coast railway line	
New South Wales	Clarence Valley	Banyabba	158.4	98.4	Pringles Way – Lawrence	
New South Wales	Clarence Valley	Mountain View	185.5	115.3	Clarence Way – Copmanhurst	
New South Wales	Clarence Valley	Koolkhan	187.2	116.3	North Coast railway line	
New South Wales	Clarence Valley	Grafton	194.1	120.6	Turf Street – Grafton	T junction
New South Wales	Clarence Valley	Grafton	195.2	121.3	Prince Street (northeast) – Grafton; Dobie Street (southeast) – Grafton	Roundabout
New South Wales	Clarence Valley	Grafton	196.0	121.8	North Coast railway line	
New South Wales	Clarence Valley	Grafton	196.1	121.9	Pound Street (northwest) – Grafton; Prince Street (southwest) – Grafton	Roundabout
New South Wales	Clarence Valley	Grafton	196.9	122.3	North Coast railway line	
New South Wales	Clarence River		197.4– 197.8	122.7– 122.9	Balun Bindarray Bridge	
New South Wales	Clarence Valley	South Grafton	198.6	123.4	Big River Way (B76 east, B76/B91 south) – Tyndale, Glenugie to Pacific Highway (A1) – Brisbane, Coffs Harbour, Newcastle, Sydney to Gwydir Highway (B76) – Glen Innes, Moree, Walgett	Southern terminus of Summerland Way at roundabout Route B91 continues southwards along Big River Way
1.000 mi = 1.609 km; 1.000 km = 0.621 mi: Concurrency terminus; Route transition

== See also ==
- Highways in Australia
- List of highways in New South Wales
