= Maryland River =

Coordinates: 28°39′S 152°16′E

Location
- Country: Australia
- State: New South Wales
- IBRA: New England Tablelands
- District: Northern Tablelands
- local government area: Tenterfield

Physical characteristics
- Source: Great Dividing Range
- Source confluence: Maryland Creek and Ruby Creek
  - location: near Maryland
  - elevation: 821 m (2,694 ft)
- Mouth: confluence with Boonoo Boonoo River to form the Clarence River
  - location: east of Rivertree
  - elevation: 249 m (817 ft)
- Length: 65 km (40 mi)

Basin features
- River system: Clarence River catchment
- Tributaries
  - left: Five Mile Creek (New South Wales), Cullendore Creek
  - right: Herding Yard Creek, Billys Creek
- National park: Maryland National Park

Maryland River is a watercourse of the Clarence River catchment in the Northern Tablelands district of New South Wales, Australia. Its upper reaches run close to the border between New South Wales and Queensland.

== Course and features ==
Formed through the confluence of Maryland Creek and Ruby Creek, Maryland River rises on the slopes of the Great Dividing Range, near Maryland, and flows generally northeast and then southeast, joined by four minor tributaries before reaching its confluence with the Boonoo Boonoo River to form the Clarence River, east of Rivertree. The river descends 572 metres (1,877 ft) over its 65 kilometres (40 mi) course; and flows through the Maryland National Park in its upper reaches.

== See also ==
- Rivers of New South Wales
