= Hibbertia surcularis =

Scientific classification
- Kingdom: Plantae
- Clade: Tracheophytes
- Clade: Angiosperms
- Clade: Eudicots
- Order: Dilleniales
- Family: Dilleniaceae
- Genus: Hibbertia
- Species: H. surcularis

Binomial name
- Hibbertia surcularis Toelken

Species of flowering plant

Hibbertia surcularis is a species of flowering plant in the family Dilleniaceae and is endemic to eastern Australia. It is a low, spreading, rhizome-forming shrub with glabrous foliage, linear leaves and yellow flowers with four stamens joined at the base on one side of two carpels.

== Description ==
Hibbertia surcularis is low, glabrous, rhizome-forming shrub that typically grows to a height of up to 30 cm (12 in). The leaves are linear, mostly 5–8 mm (0.20–0.31 in) long, 0.6–0.8 mm (0.024–0.031 in) wide on a petiole 2.0–3.5 mm (0.079–0.138 in) long. The flowers are arranged on the ends of branches with three or four linear bracts at the base. The five sepal are joined at the base, the outer lobes 3.8–4.5 mm (0.15–0.18 in) long and 1.8–2.1 mm (0.071–0.083 in) wide, the inner lobes slightly longer but broader. The petals are yellow, broadly egg-shaped with the narrower end towards the base, 5.6–7.7 mm (0.22–0.30 in) long with four stamens fused at the base on one side of two carpels, each carpel usually with four ovules. Flowering occurs in October and November.

== Taxonomy ==
Hibbertia surcularis was first formally described in 2012 by Hellmut R. Toelken in the Journal of the Adelaide Botanic Gardens from specimens collected in Boonoo Boonoo National Park in 1989. The specific epithet (surcularis) means "suckered", referring to the many "erect aerial tufts of an ever increasing area".

== Distribution and habitat ==
This hibbertia grows in moist or swampy places in heathland in or near forest or woodland on the Northern Tablelands of New South Wales and south-eastern Queensland.

== See also ==
- List of Hibbertia species
