= Cataract River =

Cataract River may refer to:

- Cataract River (Michigan), a watercourse in Michigan, United States
- Cataract River (Tenterfield), a tributary of the Clarence River in north-eastern New South Wales, Australia
- Cataract River (Wollondilly), a tributary of the Nepean River to the south of Sydney, New South Wales, Australia
