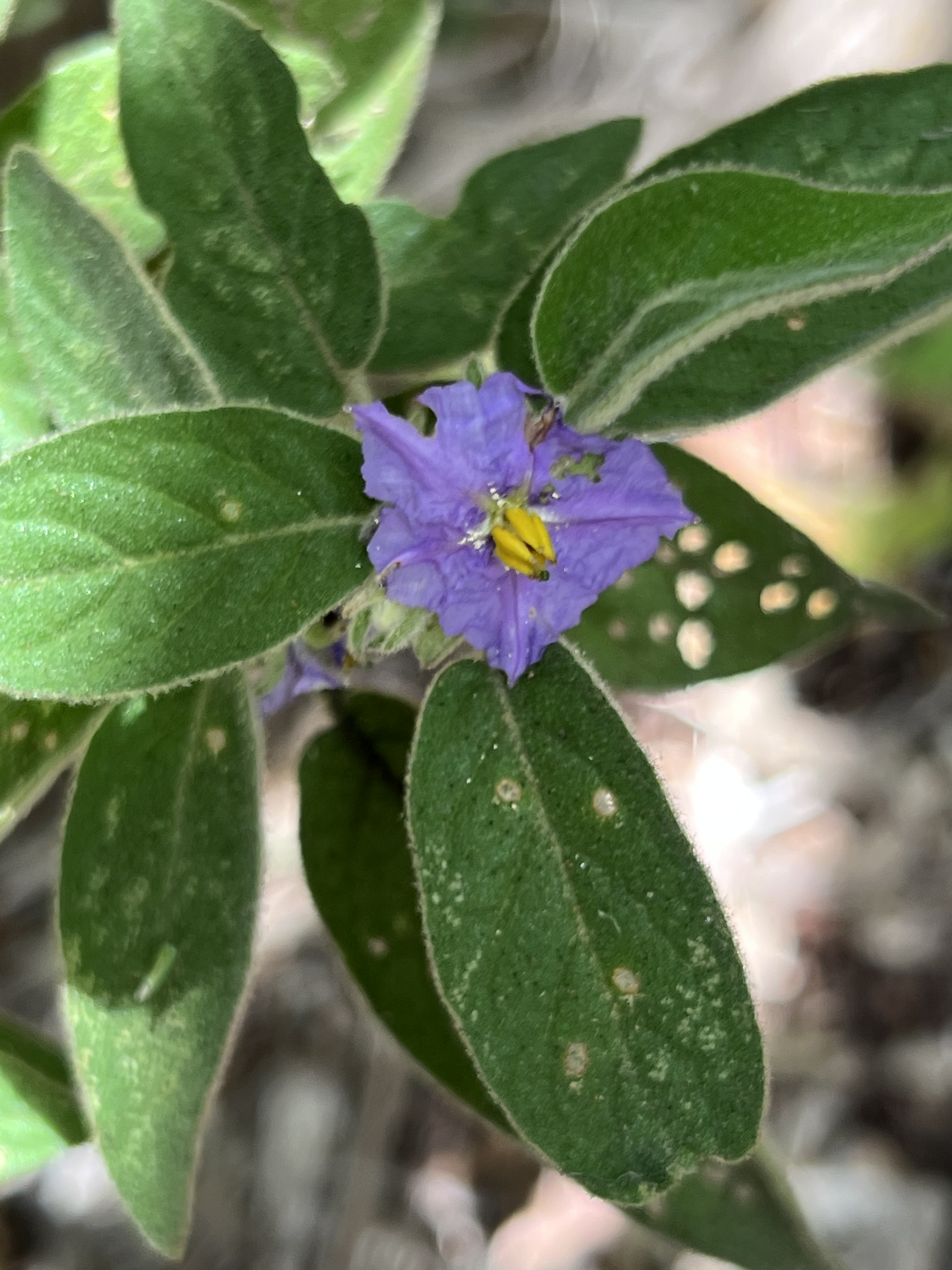

Scientific classification
- Kingdom: Plantae
- Clade: Tracheophytes
- Clade: Angiosperms
- Clade: Eudicots
- Clade: Asterids
- Order: Solanales
- Family: Solanaceae
- Genus: Solanum
- Species: S. nemophilum

Binomial name
- Solanum nemophilum F.Muell.

= Solanum nemophilum =

Species of plant

Solanum nemophilum, is a flowering plant in the family Solanaceae and grows in New South Wales and Queensland. It has purple flowers and is densely covered with star-shaped hairs.

== Description ==
Solanum nemophilum is a shrub to 1.5 m (4 ft 11 in) high, thickly covered in star-shaped hairs, rarely prickly but sometimes occur on branches. The leaves are elliptic to lance-shaped, rarely oval-shaped, 3–6 cm (1.2–2.4 in) long, 1.5–2.5 cm (0.59–0.98 in) wide, edges entire, upper and lower surfaces with soft, smooth, star-shaped hairs and both surfaces slightly a different colour on a petiole 0.5–1 cm (0.20–0.39 in) long. The flowers are in a cluster of 1–4 on a peduncle up to 5 mm (0.20 in) long and the individual flowers on a pedicel about 5 mm (0.20 in) long. The corolla is star-shaped, 15–25 mm (0.59–0.98 in) in diameter, purple or bluish, shallowly fused, the calyx 5–8 mm (0.20–0.31 in) long, each lobe 2–5 mm (0.079–0.197 in) long. Flowering occurs mostly from spring to summer and the fruit is a red berry, 5–8 mm (0.20–0.31 in) in diameter and mostly covered by the calyx lobes.

== Taxonomy ==
Solanum nemophilum was first formally described by Ferdinand von Mueller and the description was published in Fragmenta Phytographiae Australiae.

== Distribution and habitat ==
This species of solanum grows on stony outcrops in south-eastern Queensland and in the Gibraltar Range in New South Wales.
