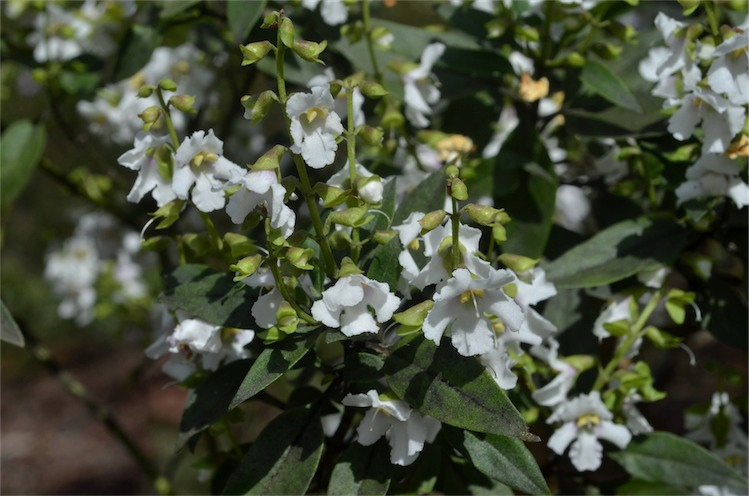

Scientific classification
- Kingdom: Plantae
- Clade: Tracheophytes
- Clade: Angiosperms
- Clade: Eudicots
- Clade: Asterids
- Order: Lamiales
- Family: Lamiaceae
- Genus: Prostanthera
- Species: P. petraea

Binomial name
- Prostanthera petraea B.J.Conn
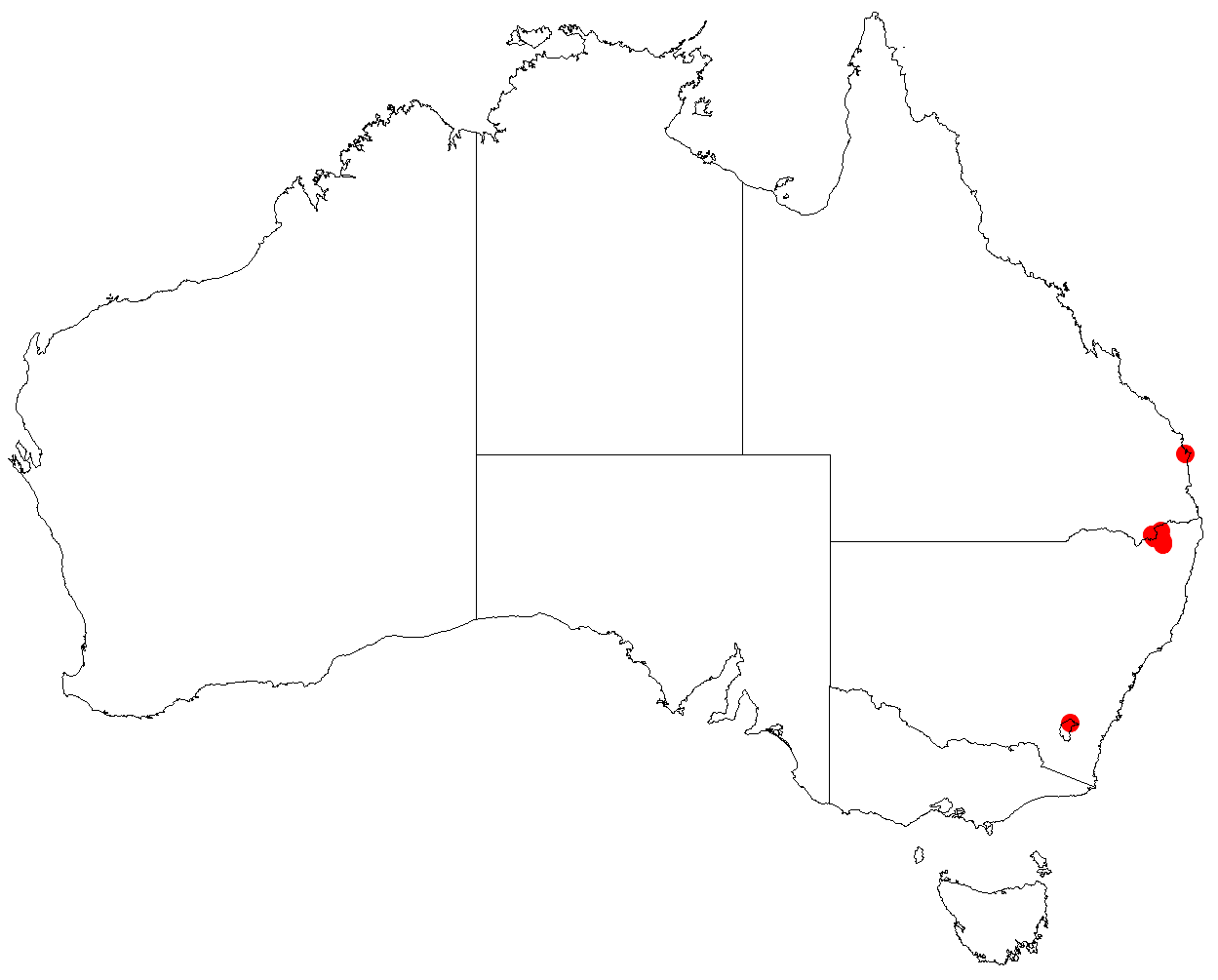
- Occurrence data from AVH

= Prostanthera petraea =

Species of flowering plant

Prostanthera petraea is a species of flowering plant in the family Lamiaceae and is endemic to a restricted area near the Queensland–New South Wales border. It is a large shrub to small tree with ridged, glandular branches, egg-shaped leaves and white flowers usually without markings.

== Description ==
Prostanthera petraea is a shrub or small tree that typically grows to a height of 1–3 m (3 ft 3 in – 9 ft 10 in) and has branches with two longitudinal ridges. The leaves are dull olive-green above, much paler below, egg-shaped, 40–70 mm (1.6–2.8 in) long and 12–26 mm (0.47–1.02 in) wide on a petiole about 5–12 mm (0.20–0.47 in) long. The flowers are arranged in groups near the ends of branchlets with bracteoles 2.5–3 mm (0.098–0.118 in) long at the base, but that fall off as the flower develops. The sepals are light green and form a tube 4.5–5 mm (0.18–0.20 in) long with two lobes, the lower lobe 3.5–4 mm (0.14–0.16 in) long and the upper lobe 2.5–3.3 mm (0.098–0.130 in) long. The petals are white, usually without markings, 8–12 mm (0.31–0.47 in) long forming a tube 5–6 mm (0.20–0.24 in) long with two lips. The central lobe of the lower lip is 5.5–7 mm (0.22–0.28 in) long and 4.5–5.5 mm (0.18–0.22 in) wide and the side lobes are 5–6 mm (0.20–0.24 in) long and 3–3.5 mm (0.12–0.14 in) wide. The upper lip is 4–5 mm (0.16–0.20 in) long and 10–12 mm (0.39–0.47 in) wide with a central notch 2–4 mm (0.079–0.157 in) long. Flowering occurs from late spring to early summer.

== Taxonomy ==
Prostanthera petraea was first formally described in 2006 by Barry Conn in the journal Telopea from material collected in Bald Rock National Park in 1992.

== Distribution and habitat ==
This mint-bush grows in woodland amongst granite boulders in the Boonoo Boonoo - Bald Rock area in far south-east Queensland and the Northern Tablelands of north-eastern New South Wales.

== Conservation status ==
Prostanthera petraea is classified as "near threatened" in Queensland under the Queensland Government Nature Conservation Act 1992.
