= Cataract River (Tenterfield) =

River in New South Wales, Australia

Coordinates: 29°04′54″S 152°07′04″E

Cataract River Swamp Oak Creek

Location
- Country: Australia
- State: New South Wales
- IBRA: New England Tablelands
- District: Northern Tablelands
- Local government area: Tenterfield

Physical characteristics
- Source: Black Mountain, Great Dividing Range
  - location: near Red Hill, southeast of Tenterfield
  - elevation: 987 m (3,238 ft)
- Mouth: confluence with the Clarence River
  - location: Paddys Flat
  - elevation: 177 m (581 ft)
- Length: 85 km (53 mi)

Basin features
- River system: Clarence River catchment
- Tributaries
  - left: Boorook Creek, Morgans Creek, Wheatley Creek
  - right: Spring Creek (New South Wales), Clear (Colongon) Creek, Crooked Creek (New South Wales)
- National parks: Basket Swamp NP, Boonoo Boonoo NP

Cataract River, a mostly perennial stream of the Clarence River catchment, is located in the Northern Tablelands district of New South Wales, Australia.

== Course and features ==
Cataract River rises on the eastern slopes of the Great Dividing Range, near Red Hill, southeast of Tenterfield and flows generally north northeast, north, and northeast, joined by six minor tributaries before reaching its confluence with the Clarence River, near Paddys Flat. The river descends 810 metres (2,660 ft) over its 85 kilometres (53 mi) course; and flows through the Basket Swamp National Park and the Boonoo Boonoo National Park.

Between Timbara Road and Sandy Hill, the course of the Cataract River is generally adjacent to the Bruxner Highway.

== See also ==
- Rivers of New South Wales
