= Warregah Island =

Locality in New South Wales, Australia

- Location within New South Wales

Geography
- Location: Clarence River
- Coordinates: 29.39°S 153.22°E
- Area: 3.23 km^{2} (1.25 sq mi)
- Coastline: 13 km (8.1 mi)
- Highest elevation: 1 m (3 ft)

Administration
- Australia
- State: New South Wales
- Local Government Area: Clarence Valley Council

Demographics
- Population: 30 (10 August 2021)

Warregah Island is an island in the Clarence River in New South Wales, Australia. It is a long narrow island in the north arm of the river adjacent to Chatsworth Island and Harwood Island. It is connected to both Chatsworth Island and the north bank of the river by road bridges on Old Murrayville Road which crosses the southwestern end of Warregah Island.

The locality of Warregah Island includes the island itself, Coolah Island on its northern edge, and the waterways on both sides out to the midline of the stream. In 2021 it had a population of 30 people.

The traditional custodians of the area including Warregah Island are the Yaygirr people.

The island is low-lying and flat. The dominant land use is farming, particularly sugarcane.
