= Timbarra River (New South Wales) =

Coordinates: 29°20′S 152°15′E

Timbarra River Rocky River

Location
- Country: Australia
- State: New South Wales
- IBRA: New England Tablelands
- District: Northern Tablelands
- local government area: Tenterfield

Physical characteristics
- Source: Gibraltar Range, Great Dividing Range
  - location: east of Bald Nob
  - elevation: 1,040 m (3,410 ft)
- Mouth: confluence with Clarence River
  - location: south southwest of Tabulam
  - elevation: 114 m (374 ft)
- Length: 169 km (105 mi)

Basin features
- River system: Clarence River catchment
- Tributaries
  - left: Morven Creek, Macleods Creek, Plumbago Creek, Nobles Creek
- National park: Gibraltar Range NP

Timbarra River, a mostly perennial stream of the Clarence River catchment, is located in the Northern Tablelands district of New South Wales, Australia.

== Course and features ==
Timbarra River rises on the slopes of Gibraltar Range, east of Bald Nob, and flows generally north northeast, joined by four minor tributaries before reaching its confluence with the Clarence River, south southwest of Tabulam. The river descends 923 metres (3,028 ft) over its 169 kilometres (105 mi) course; and flows through the Gibraltar Range National Park in its upper reaches. Between Tenterfield and Grafton, the course of Timbarra River flows adjacent to the Bruxner Highway.

== See also ==
- Rivers of New South Wales
