= Voiceless dental and alveolar trills =

Consonantal sound represented by ⟨r̥⟩ in IPA

Voiceless alveolar trill

r̥

r̊
- IPA number: 122 402A

Audio sample
- source · help

Encoding
- X-SAMPA: r_0
Image

Voiceless dental trill

r̪̊

Encoding
- X-SAMPA: r_d_0
Image

Voiceless dental and alveolar trills are a type of consonantal sound. They differ from their cognate /r/ only by the vibrations of the vocal cord. It occurs in a few languages, usually alongside the voiced version, as a similar phoneme or an allophone.

Proto-Indo-European *sr developed into a sound written as ⟨ῥ⟩, with the letter for /r/ and the diacritic for /h/, in Ancient Greek. It was probably a voiceless alveolar trill and became the regular word-initial allophone of /r/ in standard Attic Greek that has disappeared in Modern Greek.

*Proto-Indo-European *srew- > Ancient Greek ῥέω "flow", possibly [r̥é.ɔː]

== Features ==
Features of a voiceless alveolar trill:

- Its manner of articulation is trill, which means it is produced by directing air over an articulator so that it vibrates.
- Its place of articulation is dental, alveolar or post-alveolar, which means it is articulated behind upper front teeth, at the alveolar ridge or behind the alveolar ridge. It is most often apical, which means that it is pronounced with the tip of the tongue.
- Its phonation is voiceless, which means it is produced without vibrations of the vocal cords.
- It is an oral consonant, which means that air is not allowed to escape through the nose.
- It is a median consonant, which means it is produced by directing the airstream down the midline of the tongue, rather than to the sides.
- Its airstream mechanism is pulmonic, which means it is articulated by pushing air only with the intercostal muscles and abdominal muscles, as in most speech sounds.

== Occurrence ==
=== Dental ===
Language		Word	IPA	Meaning	Notes
Mongolian	Khalkha	самбар / sambar	[sɑmbɐr̪̊]	'blackboard'	Syllable-final allophone of [r̪] before voiceless consonants and in word-final position.

=== Alveolar ===
Language		Word	IPA	Meaning	Notes
Catalan	Central	mar	[ˈmär̥̆]	'sea'	Apical. Extra-short allophone of coda rhotics. See Catalan phonology
Catalan	Menorcan	mar	[ˈmär̥̆]	'sea'	Apical. Extra-short allophone of coda rhotics. See Catalan phonology
Dharumbal		barhi	[ˈbar̥i]	'stone'	Contrasts with /r/.
Dutch		ver	[vɛr̥]	'far'	Possible word-final allophone of /r/.
Estonian		kasar	[ˈkɑsɑr̥]	'(dial.) ridge'	Word-final allophone of /r/ after /t, s, h/. See Estonian phonology
Icelandic		hrafn	[ˈr̥apn̥]	'raven'	Contrasts with /r/. For some speakers it may actually be a voiceless flap. Also illustrates [n̥]. See Icelandic phonology
Kildin Sámi		yҏҏт	[ˈur̥ːt]	'east'	Contrasts with /r/, /rʲ/, and /r̥ʲ/.
Konda		puRi	[pur̥i]	'ant hill'	Contrasts /ɾ r r̥ ɽ/.
Lezgian		крчар / krčar	[ˈkʰr̥t͡ʃar]	'horns'	Allophone of /r/ between voiceless obstruents.
Limburgish	Hasselt dialect	geer	[ɣeːr̥]	'odour'	Possible word-final allophone of /r/; may be uvular [ʀ̥] instead. See Hasselt dialect phonology
Moksha		нархне / närhn'e	[ˈnar̥nʲæ]	'these grasses'	Contrasts with /r/: нарня [ˈnarnʲæ] "short grass". It has the palatalized counterpart /r̥ʲ/: марьхне [ˈmar̥ʲnʲæ] "these apples", but марьня [ˈmarʲnʲæ] "little apple"
Nivkh	Amur dialect	р̌ы / řy	[r̥ɨ]	'door'	Contrasts with /r/. In the Sakhalin dialect, typically fricated ⟨r̝̊⟩.
Northern Sámi		čahrrat	[ˈt͡ʃar̥.r̥ah(t)]	'to talk or laugh noisily'	
Polish		krtań	[ˈkr̥täɲ̟]	'larynx'	Allophone of /r/ when surrounded by voiceless consonants, or word finally after voiceless consonants. See Polish phonology
Ukrainian		центр / centr	[t̪͡s̪ɛn̪t̪r̥]	'centre'	Word-final allophone of /r/ after /t/. See Ukrainian phonology
Welsh		Rhagfyr	[ˈr̥aɡvɨr]	'December'	Contrasts with /r/. See Welsh phonology
Yaygirr		dirha	[ˈdir̥a]	'tooth'	Contrasts with /r/.
Zapotec	Quiegolani	rsil	[r̥sil]	'early'	Allophone of /r/.

== Fricative trill ==
Voiceless alveolar fricative trill

r̝̊

r̻̊
- IPA number: 122 402A 429

Audio sample
- source · help

Encoding
- X-SAMPA: r_0_r

A voiceless alveolar fricative trill is not known to occur as a phoneme in any language, except possibly the East Sakhalin dialect of Nivkh. It occurs allophonically in Czech.

=== Features ===
Features of a voiceless alveolar fricative trill:

- Its manner of articulation is fricative trill, which means it is a non-sibilant fricative and a trill pronounced simultaneously.
- Its place of articulation is laminal alveolar, which means it is articulated with the blade of the tongue at the alveolar ridge.
- Its phonation is voiceless, which means it is produced without vibrations of the vocal cords. In some languages the vocal cords are actively separated, so it is always voiceless; in others the cords are lax, so that it may take on the voicing of adjacent sounds.
- It is an oral consonant, which means that air is not allowed to escape through the nose.
- It is a median consonant, which means it is produced by directing the airstream down the midline of the tongue, rather than to the sides.
- Its airstream mechanism is pulmonic, which means it is articulated by pushing air only with the intercostal muscles and abdominal muscles, as in most speech sounds.

=== Occurrence ===
Language		Word	IPA	Meaning	Notes
Czech		příliš	[ˈpr̝̊iːlɪʃ]	'too (much)'	Allophone of /r̝/ after voiceless consonants; may be a tapped fricative instead. See Czech phonology
Norwegian	Areas around Narvik	norsk	[nɔr̝̊k]	'Norwegian'	Allophone of the sequence /ɾs/ before voiceless consonants.
Norwegian	Some subdialects of Trøndersk	norsk	[nɔr̝̊k]	'Norwegian'	Allophone of the sequence /ɾs/ before voiceless consonants.
Nivkh	(East) Sakhalin dialect	р̌ы / řy	[r̝̊ɨ]	'door'	Contrasts with /r/. In the Amur dialect, typically realized as ⟨r̥⟩.
Polish	Some dialects	przyjść	[ˈpr̝̊ɘjɕt͡ɕ]	'to come'	Allophone of /r̝/ after voiceless consonants for speakers that do not merge it with /ʐ/. Present in areas from Starogard Gdański to Malbork and those south, west and northwest of them, area from Lubawa to Olsztyn to Olecko to Działdowo, south and east from Wieleń, around Wołomin, southeast from Ostrów Mazowiecka and west from Siedlce, from Brzeg to Opole and those north of them, and roughly from Racibórz to Nowy Targ. Most speakers, including speakers of standard Polish, pronounce it the same as /ʂ/, and speakers maintaining the distinction (which is mostly the elderly) sporadically do so too.
Silesian	Gmina Istebna				Allophone of /r̝/ after voiceless consonants. It is pronounced the same as /ʂ/ in most Polish dialects.
Silesian	Jablunkov				Allophone of /r̝/ after voiceless consonants. It is pronounced the same as /ʂ/ in most Polish dialects.

== See also ==
- Index of phonetics articles

== Notes ==
Place →	Labial					Coronal										Dorsal					Laryngeal			
Manner ↓	Bilabial		Labiodental		Linguolabial		Dental		Alveolar		Postalveolar		Retroflex		(Alveolo-)palatal		Velar		Uvular		Pharyngeal/epiglottal		Glottal	
Nasal	m̥	m	ɱ̊	ɱ		n̼	n̪̊	n̪	n̥	n	n̠̊	n̠	ɳ̊	ɳ	ɲ̊	ɲ	ŋ̊	ŋ	ɴ̥	ɴ				
Plosive	p	b	p̪	b̪	t̼	d̼	t̪	d̪	t	d			ʈ	ɖ	c	ɟ	k	ɡ	q	ɢ	ʡ		ʔ	
Sibilant affricate							t̪s̪	d̪z̪	ts	dz	t̠ʃ	d̠ʒ	tʂ	dʐ	tɕ	dʑ								
Non-sibilant affricate	pɸ	bβ	p̪f	b̪v			t̪θ	d̪ð	tɹ̝̊	dɹ̝	t̠ɹ̠̊˔	d̠ɹ̠˔			cç	ɟʝ	kx	ɡɣ	qχ	ɢʁ	ʡʜ	ʡʢ	ʔh	
Sibilant fricative							s̪	z̪	s	z	ʃ	ʒ	ʂ	ʐ	ɕ	ʑ								
Non-sibilant fricative	ɸ	β	f	v	θ̼	ð̼	θ	ð	θ̠	ð̠	ɹ̠̊˔	ɹ̠˔	ɻ̊˔	ɻ˔	ç	ʝ	x	ɣ	χ	ʁ	ħ	ʕ	h	ɦ
Approximant		β̞		ʋ				ð̞		ɹ		ɹ̠		ɻ		j		ɰ						˷
Tap/flap		ⱱ̟		ⱱ					ɾ̥	ɾ			ɽ̊	ɽ						ɢ̆		ʡ̆		
Trill	ʙ̥	ʙ							r̥	r		r̠	ɽ̊r̥	ɽr					ʀ̥	ʀ	ʜ	ʢ		
Lateral affricate									tɬ	dɮ			tꞎ	d𝼅	c𝼆	ɟʎ̝	k𝼄	ɡʟ̝						
Lateral fricative							ɬ̪		ɬ	ɮ			ꞎ	𝼅	𝼆	ʎ̝	𝼄	ʟ̝						
Lateral approximant								l̪	l̥	l		l̠	ɭ̊	ɭ	ʎ̥	ʎ	ʟ̥	ʟ		ʟ̠				
Lateral tap/flap									ɺ̥	ɺ			𝼈̊	𝼈		ʎ̆		ʟ̆						

		BL	LD	D	A	PA	RF	P	V	U
Implosive	Voiced	ɓ			ɗ		ᶑ	ʄ	ɠ	ʛ
Implosive	Voiceless	ɓ̥			ɗ̥		ᶑ̊	ʄ̊	ɠ̊	ʛ̥
Ejective	Stop	pʼ			tʼ		ʈʼ	cʼ	kʼ	qʼ
Ejective	Affricate		p̪fʼ	tθʼ	tsʼ	tʃʼ	tʂʼ	tɕʼ	kxʼ	qχʼ
Ejective	Fricative	ɸʼ	fʼ	θʼ	sʼ	ʃʼ	ʂʼ	ɕʼ	xʼ	χʼ
Ejective	Lateral affricate				tɬʼ			c𝼆ʼ	k𝼄ʼ	q𝼄ʼ
Ejective	Lateral fricative				ɬʼ					
Click (top: velar; bottom: uvular)	Tenuis	kʘ qʘ		kǀ qǀ	kǃ qǃ		k𝼊 q𝼊	kǂ qǂ		
Click (top: velar; bottom: uvular)	Voiced	ɡʘ ɢʘ		ɡǀ ɢǀ	ɡǃ ɢǃ		ɡ𝼊 ɢ𝼊	ɡǂ ɢǂ		
Click (top: velar; bottom: uvular)	Nasal	ŋʘ ɴʘ		ŋǀ ɴǀ	ŋǃ ɴǃ		ŋ𝼊 ɴ𝼊	ŋǂ ɴǂ	ʞ	
Click (top: velar; bottom: uvular)	Tenuis lateral				kǁ qǁ					
Click (top: velar; bottom: uvular)	Voiced lateral				ɡǁ ɢǁ					
Click (top: velar; bottom: uvular)	Nasal lateral				ŋǁ ɴǁ					
