= Boonoo Boonoo River =

Coordinates: 28°38′S 152°17′E

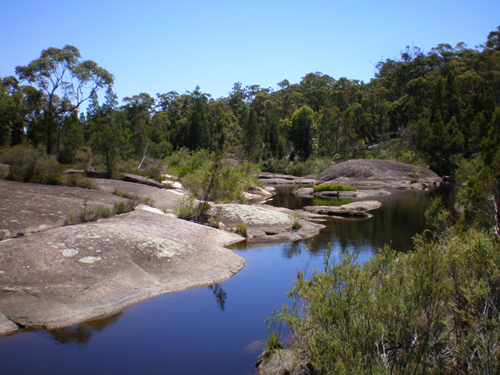
- Boonoo Boonoo River, 2010
- Etymology: Aboriginal: "poor country with no animals to provide food"

Location
- Country: Australia
- State: New South Wales
- IBRA: NSW North Coast
- District: Northern Tablelands
- Local government area: Tenterfield

Physical characteristics
- Source: Great Dividing Range
  - location: near Boonoo Boonoo and Mount Lindesay Highway
  - elevation: 955 m (3,133 ft)
- Mouth: confluence with the Maryland River
  - location: east of Rivertree
  - elevation: 249 m (817 ft)
- Length: 44 km (27 mi)

Basin features
- River system: Clarence River catchment
- Tributaries
  - left: Carrolls Creek, Hells Hollow Creek, Cadiangullong Creek, Bookookoorara Creek
  - right: Twomile Creek (NSW), Gilcurry Creek, Razor Back Creek
- National parks: Bald Rock NP, Boonoo Boonoo NP

Boonoo Boonoo River, a watercourse of the Clarence River catchment, is located in the Northern Tablelands district of New South Wales, Australia.

== Course and features ==
Boonoo Boonoo River rises on the slopes of the Great Dividing Range, near Boonoo Boonoo and Mount Lindesay Highway, and generally flows northeast, joined by seven minor tributaries before reaching its confluence with the Maryland River, east of Rivertree. The river descends 706 metres (2,316 ft) over its 44 kilometres (27 mi) course; and flows through the Bald Rock National Park and the Boonoo Boonoo National Park, descending through Boonoo Boonoo Falls in its upper reaches.

The name Boonoo Boonoo is derived from the Aboriginal phrase meaning "poor country with no animals to provide food".

== See also ==
- Rivers of New South Wales
