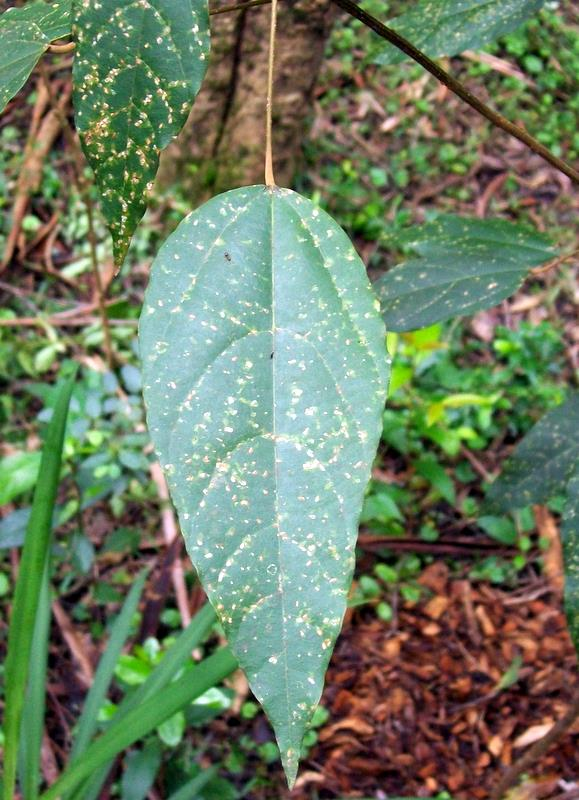

Scientific classification
- Kingdom: Plantae
- Clade: Tracheophytes
- Clade: Angiosperms
- Clade: Eudicots
- Clade: Rosids
- Order: Malpighiales
- Family: Euphorbiaceae
- Genus: Mallotus
- Species: M. discolor

Binomial name
- Mallotus discolor (Benth.)

Synonyms
- Rottlera discolor F.Muell.; Macaranga mallotoides F.Muell.

= Mallotus discolor =

Yellow kamala

Species of tree

Mallotus discolor is an Australian rainforest tree in the spurge family. It is known as the yellow kamala, due to the yellowish orange fruit covering, which produces a yellow dye.

== Description ==
It is a small to medium-sized tree, often around 12 metres (39 ft) tall. However, at Andrew Johnston Big Scrub Nature Reserve near Lismore, there is a 30-metre-tall (98 ft) yellow kamala with a 50-centimetre-broad (20 in) trunk. Another 30-metre-tall (98 ft) tree grows at Susan Island Nature Reserve; that individual has an 80-centimetre-broad (31 in) trunk. The natural range of distribution is from just west of Coffs Harbour (30° S) in northern New South Wales to Bowen, Queensland (20° S).

The trunk is not buttressed. The bark on older trees may have some cracks and scales. Generally fairly smooth. Small branches are slender, green or brown with reddish hairy growth towards the end.

Leaves feature long stems, variable in length but usually between 4 and 10 cm. Leaves alternate on the stem, without leaf teeth, lanceolate or ovate in shape with a long tip. The leaves are fairly thin, 4 to 10 cm long. The underside is greyish, the upper surface green, almost hairless. Hence the species name discolor, meaning two colours.

=== Flowers, fruit and regeneration ===
Grey flowers form in November on racemes, 7 to 10 cm long. The fruit matures in January, being a moist capsule with a yellowish orange covering. The capsule is around 6 mm in diameter. The fruit is eaten by the green catbird, Lewin's honeyeater, grey-headed flying fox and others.

Regeneration from fresh seed is erratic, cuttings are an alternative method of regeneration.
