= Esk River (New South Wales) =

River in New South Wales, Australia

Coordinates: 30°19′S 152°44′E

Esk River Fresh Water River
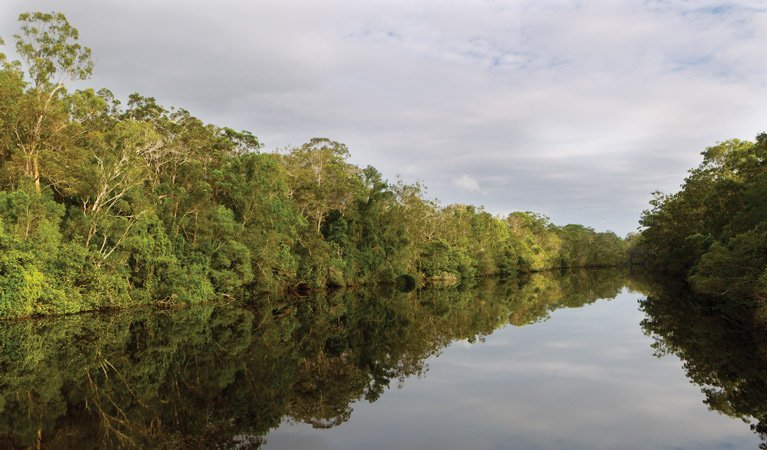
- Esk River paddle route, Bundjalung National Park

Location
- Country: Australia
- State: New South Wales
- Region: NSW North Coast (IBRA), Northern Rivers
- District: Richmond Valley
- Town: Iluka

Physical characteristics
- Source: Richmond Range
  - location: southeast of Tabbimoble
  - elevation: 23.5 m (77 ft)
- Mouth: confluence with the northern arm of the Clarence River
  - location: Iluka
  - elevation: 0 m (0 ft)
- Length: 25.2 km (15.7 mi)

Basin features
- River system: Clarence River catchment
- National park: Bundjalung National Park

Esk River, a perennial stream that is part of the Clarence River catchment, is located in the Northern Rivers region of New South Wales, Australia.

== Course and features ==
Esk River rises below Richmond Range, southeast of Tabbimoble, and flows generally to south through Bundjalung National Park towards its confluence with the northern arm of the Clarence River, northwest of the coastal fishing village of Iluka. The river descends 28 metres (92 ft) over its 25 kilometres (16 mi) course.

The river is an increasingly popular kayak fishing location that is home to a variety of fish species such as yellowfin bream, dusky flathead and sand whiting in its lower brackish areas and has a good population of Australian bass in its fresh water reaches. The Esk River is considered the largest untouched coastal river system on the New South Wales North Coast.

== See also ==
- List of rivers of Australia
- List of rivers of New South Wales (A–K)
- Rivers of New South Wales
