= Susan Island Nature Reserve =

Protected area in New South Wales, Australia

- IUCN category IV (habitat/species management area)
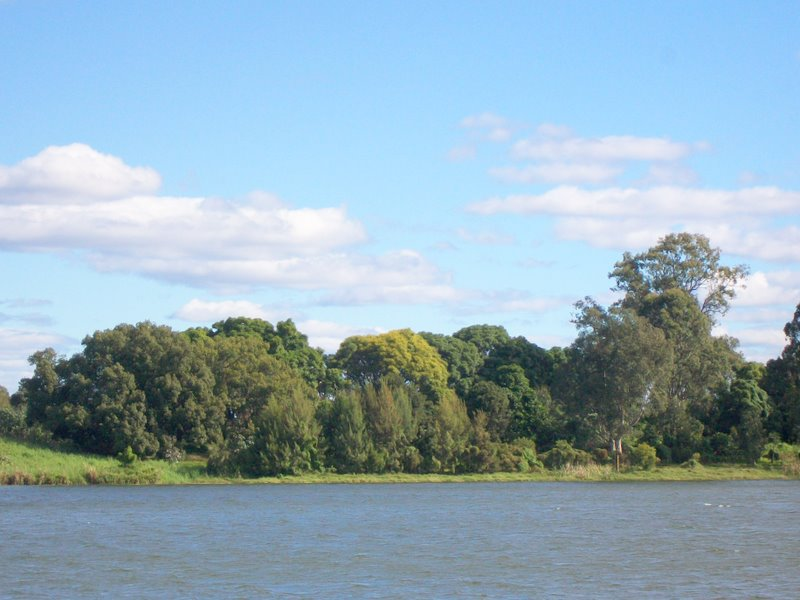
- Susan Island

- Location within New South Wales
- Location: New South Wales
- Nearest city: Grafton
- Coordinates: 29°40′55″S 152°54′49″E
- Area: 0.23 km^{2} (0.089 sq mi)
- Established: May 1982
- Governing body: NSW National Parks & Wildlife Service
- Website: Official website

Susan Island
- Interactive map of Susan Island

Geography
- Location: Clarence River

Administration
- Australia
- State: New South Wales

The Susan Island Nature Reserve is a protected 20-hectare (49-acre) nature reserve located at the western (upstream) end of the 90ha Susan Island, a 3km long x 420m wide river island, in the Clarence River, in the Northern Rivers region of New South Wales in eastern Australia near the centre of Grafton. The rainforest of the nature reserve and adjoining crown land is a rare 19-hectare (47-acre) example of subtropical lowland rainforest on floodplain, and is listed under the NSW Biodiversity Conservation Act as an Endangered Ecological Community.

Although only 23ha in total, the nature reserve contains the largest remaining remnant of this rainforest community in the Clarence Valley, together with smaller remnants in Coramba Nature Reserve (9ha) and in the Maclean Rainforest Reserve (2ha). A long-term rainforest regeneration program has successfully been undertaken since the early 1990s to protect, restore and enhance the reserve's lowland subtropical rainforest from the damaging impacts of destructive invasive weeds, particularly fast-growing exotic vines such as cat's claw creeper, Dutchman's pipe, moonflower and balloon vine which have infested and damaged all northern NSW riparian zones since the early 1990s by forming dense heavy curtains that blanket and kill trees, then collapse and suppress the rainforest canopy.

== Features ==
Most of the lowland subtropical rainforest on Susan Island was cleared for timber harvesting to provide the management Trust with funds, to facilitate grazing, and to create Grafton's first rifle range, leaving only a small remnant over the western (upstream) third of the island. The island soils are alluvial, derived from Clarence River flood deposition. The average annual rainfall is a modest 1,080 millimetres (43 in), which is marginal for this type of vegetation community, described by Floyd as a dry form of subtropical rainforest.

=== Fauna ===
The major faunal feature of the island is its ongoing usage as a year-round roost and maternity camp site by the threatened grey-headed flying fox, since at least the time of European settlement of the Clarence. Fauna surveys in the late 1990s and 2000s recorded over 160 bird species, 12 reptile species and 15 mammal species on the island. However, variety of these species is far fewer than reports of the island's inhabitants at the time of European settlement, which at the time included koalas, gliders and quolls.

At peak periods over summer coinciding with flowering of the nearby eucalyptus forests, the numbers of the three species of flying foxes regularly total in excess of 100,000, sometimes over 300,000, usually swollen by a massive temporary influx of little red flying foxes following the blossoming hardwood forests. Noteworthy bird species recorded here include threatened species such as the white-bellied sea eagle, osprey, wompoo fruit-dove, the shy, cryptic snail-eating noisy pitta, and the ubiquitous eastern yellow robins, grey fantails and Lewin's honeyeaters.

The island contains the southernmost population of Fraser’s banded rainforest snail (Sphaerospira fraseri), a large hard-shelled native rainforest mollusc.

=== Flora ===
Over 100 native tree and shrub species including 94 species of rainforest trees and shrubs are known to grow on the island. Significant tree species include forest red gum, huge Moreton Bay figs, giant stinging tree, pepperberry, tulipwood, lacebark, red bean and black bean. The largest known yellow kamala 30 metres (98 ft) tall with a trunk diameter of 80 centimetres (31 in) was recorded on the island by Floyd. The widespread tropical Asian species while bean grows on the island at its southernmost limit of natural distribution, also the largest recorded by Floyd in NSW for height and girth although storm damage has since reduced its height.

Red cedar was logged from the island until the 1920s when it became exhausted and there was no regeneration. It was successfully reintroduced to the island in 2001 by NPWS during a modest rainforest expansion program, and is now thriving and reproducing. NPWS commenced rainforest regeneration programs in the late 1980s to protect and expand the endangered lowland rainforest and suppress destructive invasive weeds, such as exotic vines, camphor laurel and broad-leaved privet after initially focussing only on dense stands of prickly pear to allow access.

== Indigenous Australians ==
It is likely that Indigenous Australians regularly visited the island for various purposes, such as fishing and hunting, the collection of food and medicines from the rainforest, and the collection of fibres for making bags and nets. The island has spiritual significance to the local Gumbaygnirr people, where it is recognised as a "Women's Site" and officially acknowledged as an Aboriginal Place under the NSW National Parks and Wildlife Act.

== See also ==
- List of islands of New South Wales
- Protected areas of New South Wales
