= Balun Bindarray Bridge =

Bridge in New South Wales, Australia

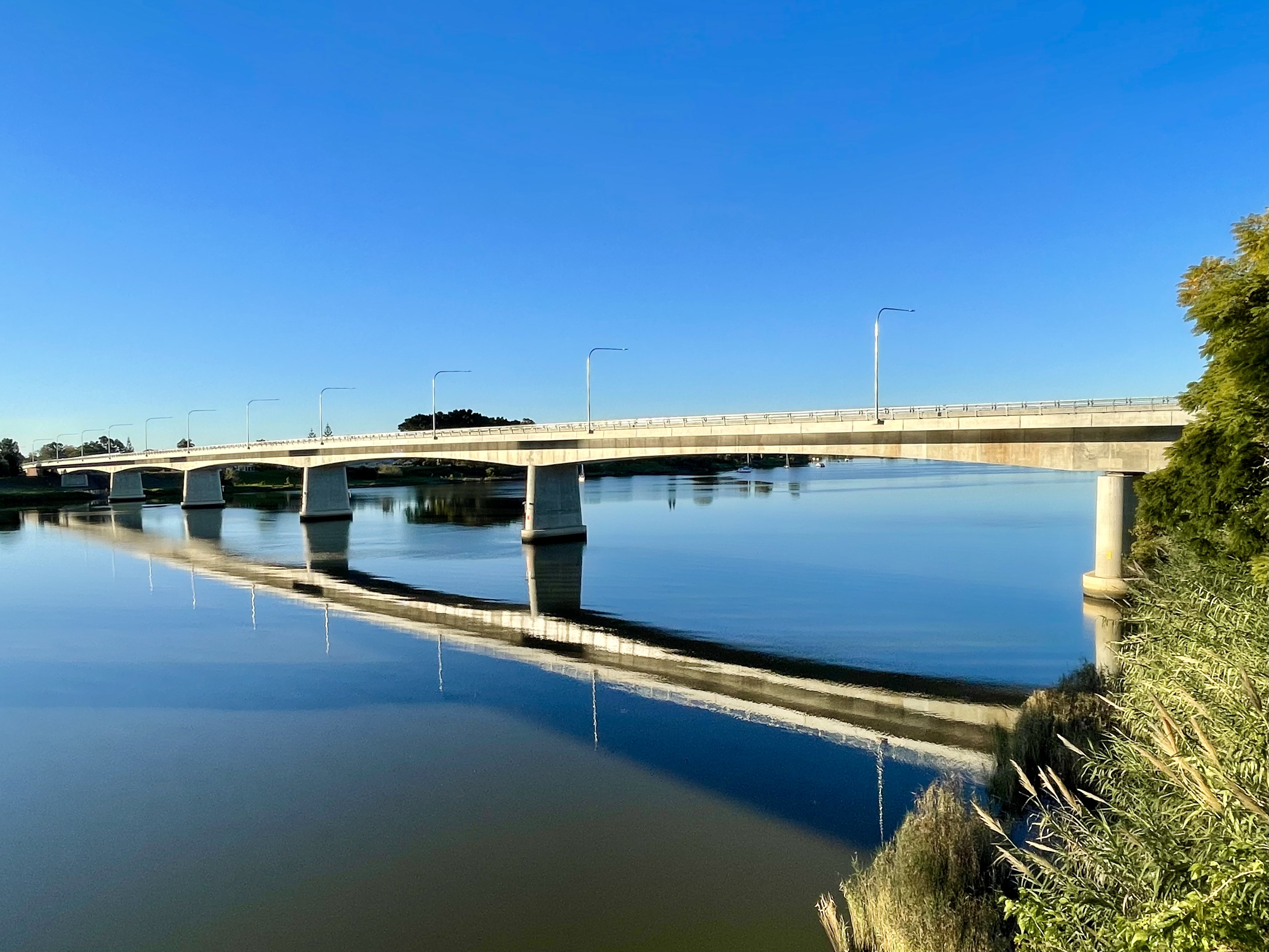
- Coordinates: 29°41′52″S 152°56′34″E
- Carries: Shirley Adams Way (Summerland Way): Motor vehicles; Pedestrians
- Crosses: Clarence River
- Locale: Grafton, New South Wales, Australia
- Maintained by: Transport for NSW

Characteristics
- Design: Girder bridge
- Material: Steel
- Trough construction: Concrete
- Total length: 525 metres (1,722 ft)

History
- Constructed by: Fulton Hogan
- Construction start: November 2016
- Construction end: 2019
- Construction cost: A$240 million
- Inaugurated: 12 December 2019 by Chris Gulaptis, Member for Clarence
- Replaces: Grafton Bridge (since 2019) (Concurrent use as a road bridge)

Location
- Interactive map of Balun Bindarray Bridge

The Balun Bindarray Bridge, formerly the New Grafton Bridge, is a bridge located 70 metres (230 ft) east of the Grafton Bridge and opened to traffic on 12 December 2019. The bridge carries two lanes of Shirley Adams Way (Summerland Way) and has been designed to be increased to four lanes when traffic levels require it. It also carries a grade-separated footpath and cycleway.

== History ==
In 2002, the NSW Government commissioned a study into a crossing over Clarence River, additional to the Grafton Bridge, released in early 2003.

In October 2008, federal, state and local government representatives inspected the existing bridge. It was claimed that this bridge was not coping with the increasing volume of traffic. Estimates of replacing the bridge were in the range of A$100 million. In December 2012, the Roads & Maritime Services (RMS) announced that a preferred option of an additional crossing of the Clarence River had been identified and went on public display for comment. RMS also announced that a final decision was expected during 2013. Construction commenced on the new crossing, then named New Grafton Bridge, in November 2016 and the bridge was opened on 12 December 2019 by Chris Gulaptis, the Member for Clarence.

Summerland Way was also rerouted from the old bridge onto the new bridge.

The bridge was renamed on 27 November 2022 after review by the Clarence Valley Council and Transport for NSW to enquire to the public to help name the bridge. The name refers to balun – meaning river in Bundjalung, and bindarray – meaning river in Gumbaynggirr. The two languages are spoken by Aboriginal peoples in the Clarence Valley region of New South Wales, Australia. The access roads and walkways on either side of the bridge were named the Shirley Way in honor of Shirley Adams, the first female mayor of Grafton City Council. The road was renamed again to Shirley Adams Way in July 2024 to incorporate the late mayor's family name.

== Gallery ==
Pictures of Balun Bindarray Bridge

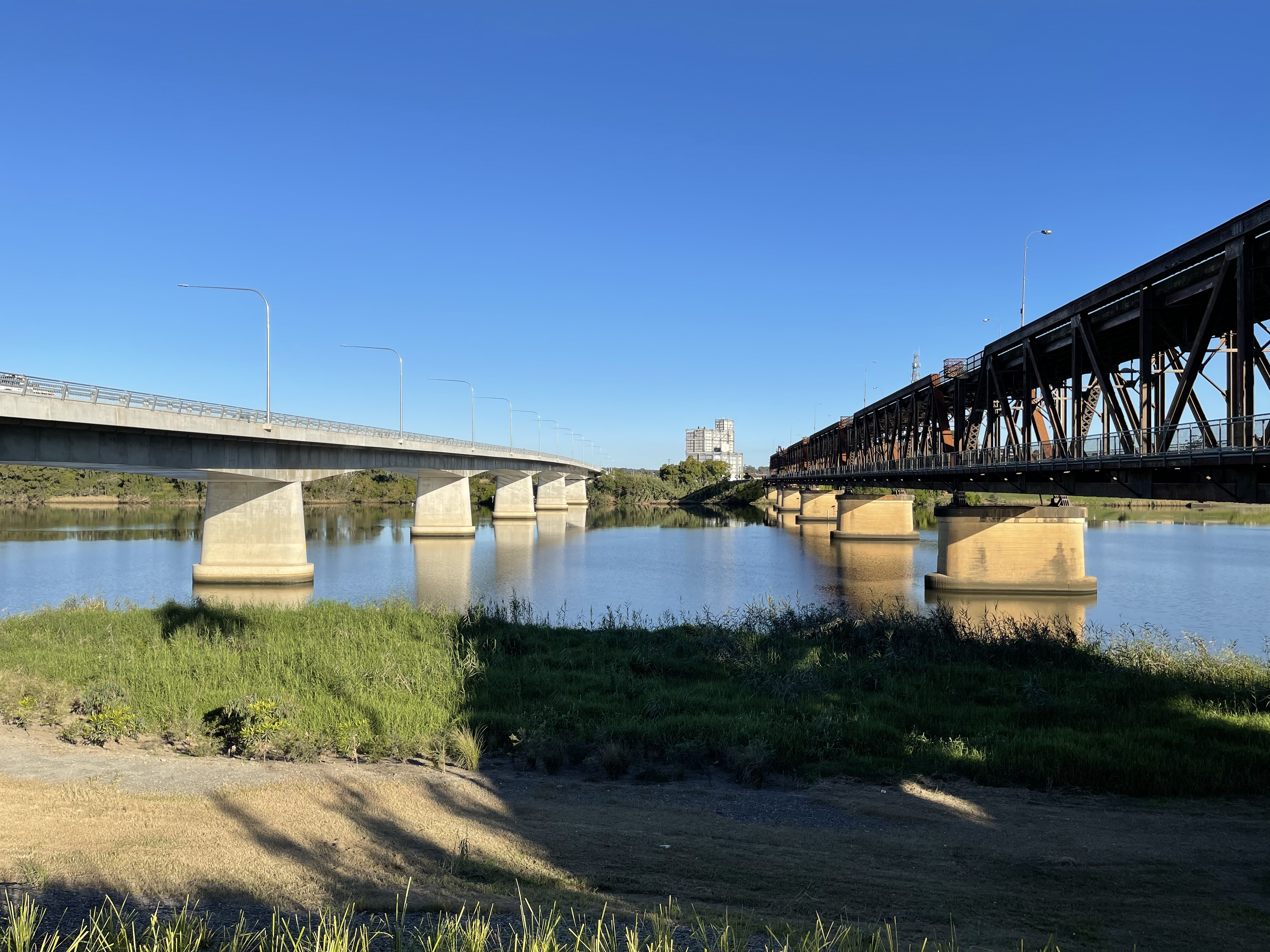
grafton bridge and balun bindarray bridge from north bank

== See also ==
- List of bridges in Australia
