= Grafton Bridge (New South Wales) =

Bridge in New South Wales, Australia

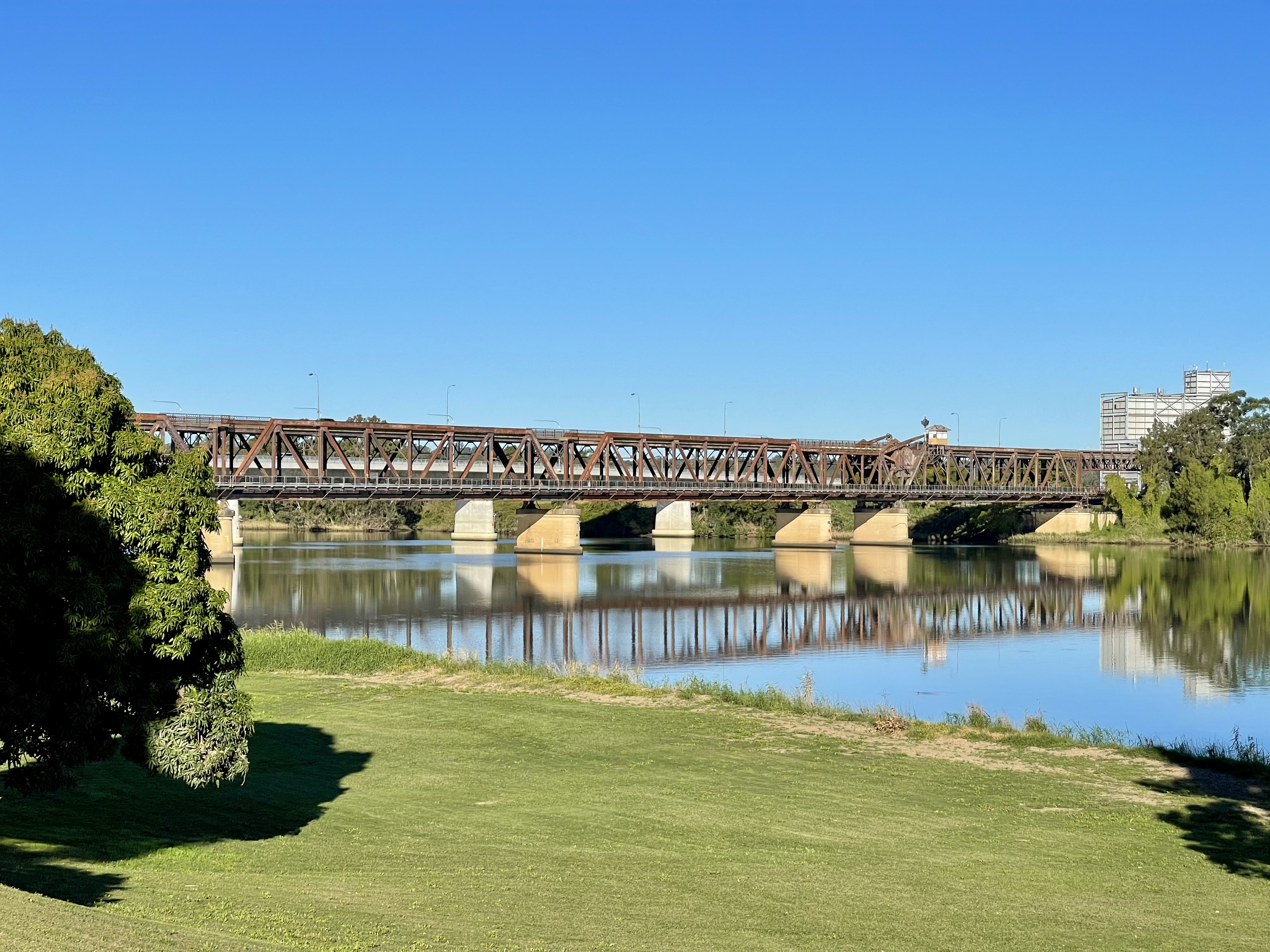
- View of Grafton Bridge from the north bank of the Clarence River, in 2021
- Coordinates: 29°41′53″S 152°56′32″E
- Carries: Bent Street; North Coast railway line; Motor vehicles; Railway line; Water supply; Pedestrians
- Crosses: Clarence River
- Locale: Grafton, New South Wales, Australia
- Maintained by: Transport for NSW

Characteristics
- Design: double-deck bascule truss bridge
- Material: Steel
- Pier construction: Concrete
- Piers in water: 7
- Clearance above: 12 metres (38 ft)
- Clearance below: 3 metres (11 ft)

History
- Constructed by: NSW Public Works Department
- Construction start: 1922
- Construction end: 1932
- Construction cost: A£500,000
- Inaugurated: 19 July 1932 by Sir Isaac Isaacs, Governor-General of Australia
- Replaced by: Balun Bindarray Bridge (since 2019) (Concurrent use as a road bridge)

Location
- Interactive map of Grafton Bridge

The Grafton Bridge is a heritage-listed double-deck bascule truss bridge that carries Bent Street (formerly the Summerland Way) and North Coast railway line across the Clarence River in Grafton, New South Wales, Australia. The bridge links the Grafton central business district with South Grafton, and was added to the New South Wales State Heritage Register on 2 April 1999.

A parallel Balun Bindarray Bridge, located 70 metres (230 ft) east of the original bridge and initially consisting of two lanes, opened to traffic on 12 December 2019.

== History ==
A bridge over the Clarence River in Grafton was first conceived in 1915. The original design called for a railway bridge with a footway, but in 1922 the design was changed to accommodate vehicular traffic as well. The bridge was built from 1927 to 1932, although planning for the bridge had been under way as early as 1921. The bridge was designed and built by the New South Wales Public Works Department with steelwork from Clyde Engineering. The department decided to construct the bridge itself after being unhappy with the high cost proposed by private tenderers for the project. It was formally opened by Governor-General of Australia Sir Isaac Isaacs on 19 July 1932.

== First bridge ==
The upper level of the bridge supports a two way road for traffic via Bent Street, and its lower level supports a rail bridge that carries the North Coast railway line, a water main, and footbridges on either side.

There is provision for a second track across the bridge but at this time it is being used as an easement for a water main.

The bascule span was operational from its opening in 1932 until 1969. The bascule can no longer be raised due to an added water main. With the decline in shipping along the Clarence River, the opening span was sealed shut and it can no longer be opened.

The bridge heritage listing also includes the three remnant spans of the 1915 timber viaduct south of Grafton railway station, which now remain in situ amidst parkland.

=== Heritage listing ===
This bridge is a double-deck road/rail structure, the only one of its type in New South Wales. There is a lift span to allow passing of river traffic that is no longer in use. The bridge presents a commanding visual reminder of rail and road to residents of Grafton. Opening of the bridge in 1932 completed the North coast standard gauge line between Sydney and Brisbane, avoiding the winding route via Tenterfield.

The viaduct along with the wharf remains are important relics of the development of the north coast railway. The viaduct is representative of similar structures constructed at a range of locations, many of which have been replaced.

The Grafton Bridge was listed on the New South Wales State Heritage Register on 2 April 1999 having satisfied the following criteria.

The place possesses uncommon, rare or endangered aspects of the cultural or natural history of New South Wales.

This item is assessed as historically rare. This item is assessed as scientifically rare. This item is assessed as architecturally rare. This item is assessed as socially rare.

== Second bridge ==
Due to high traffic volumes a new parallel bridge was built known as Balun Bindarray Bridge, in November 2016 and the bridge was opened on 12 December 2019 by Chris Gulaptis, the Member for Clarence. The New Grafton Bridge consists of two lanes and has been designed to be increased to four lanes when traffic levels require it. The bridge also carries a grade-separated footpath and cycleway.

== Gallery ==
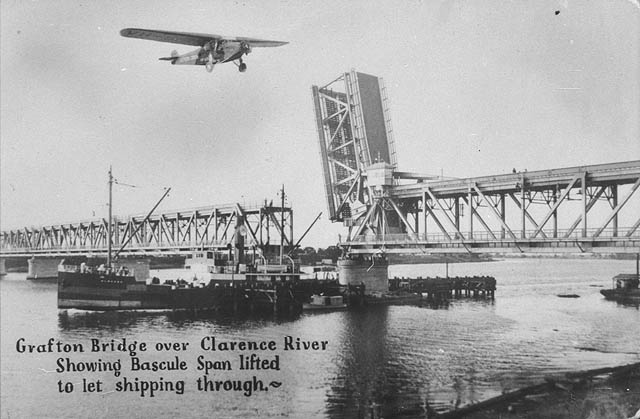
Grafton Bridge showing Bascule span lifted to let shipping through; c. 1932

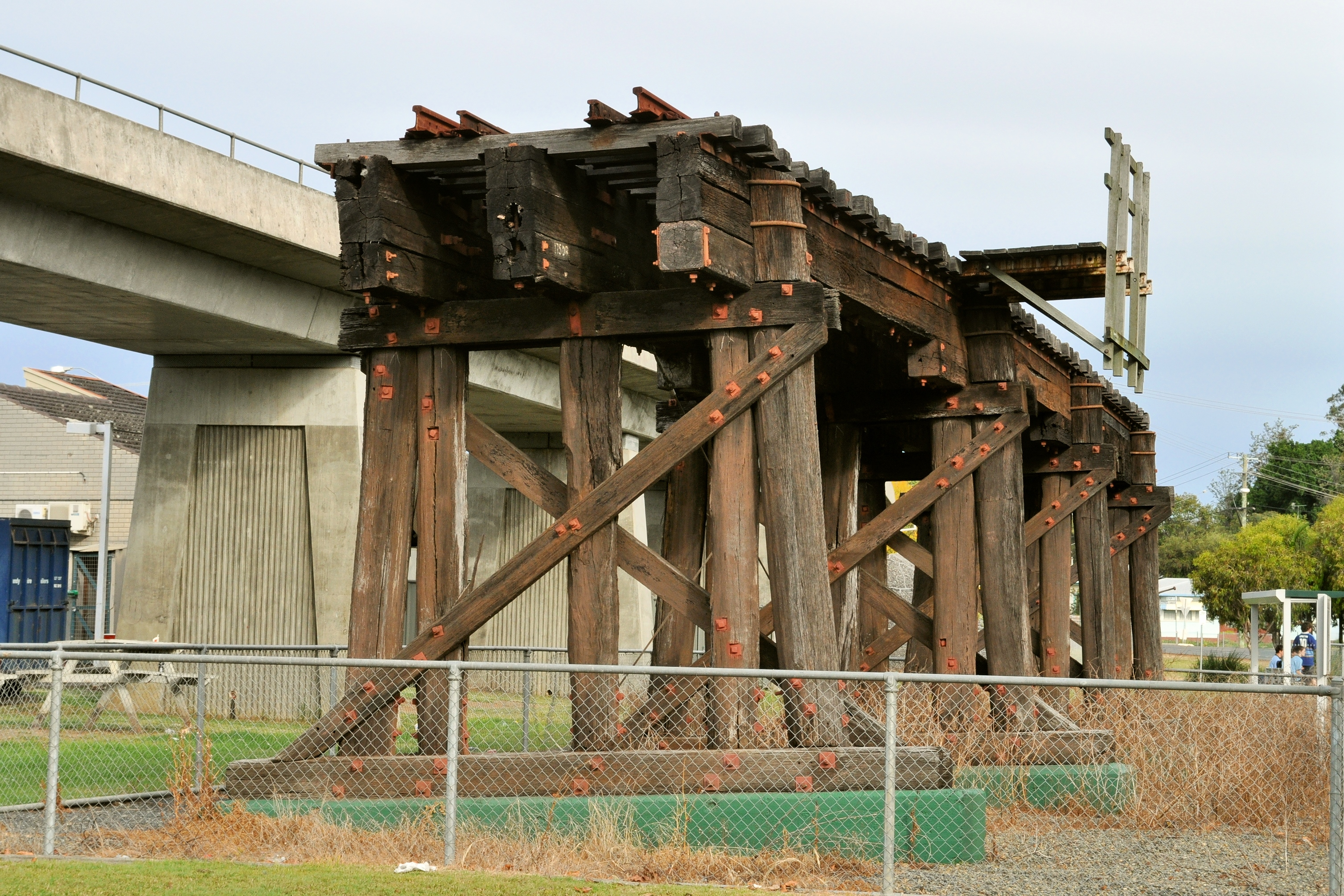
Historic timber viaduct remains

== See also ==
- List of bridges in Australia
- List of railway bridges in New South Wales
- List of road bridges in New South Wales
