= Gibraltar Range =

Mountain range in Australia

Gibraltar
- Location within New South Wales

Highest point
- Peak: Summit Mountain (New South Wales)
- Elevation: 1,170 m (3,840 ft); AHD
- Listing: Mountains in New South Wales
- Coordinates: 29°29′S 152°21′E

Dimensions
- Length: 100 km (62 mi) ENE / NNE

Geography
- Country: Australia
- State: New South Wales
- Range coordinates: 29°30′S 152°17′E
- Parent range: Great Dividing Range

The Gibraltar Range is a mountain range in the Northern Tablelands region of New South Wales, Australia. The range extends off the Great Dividing Range at Bald Nob about 25 kilometres (16 mi) east northeast of Glen Innes and trends generally east northeast and north northeast for about 100 kilometres (62 mi) to the junction of Timbarra and Clarence rivers. It forms the watershed between these two rivers.

Within the range is the Gibraltar Range National Park. Mines in the area have produced amalgamated ores of titanium, tin, gold, nickel, rhodium and iron. Recently, there have been forest fires or threats of forest fires in the Gibraltar Range.

== Location and features ==
The Gibraltar Range is located in the northeastern part of New South Wales. The mountain range is the site of the Gibraltar Range National Park, one of the Gondwana Rainforests of Australia. The mountains are found in the Clarence Valley Council area. The range is inland of Grafton. The Gwydir Highway runs through the range and its national park.

The Gibraltar Range is defined by its high ridges and steep valleys that intersect plateaus. They were created in the middle of the Palaeozoic Era. Volcanoes found in the range date to the Late Permian (Lopingian) Epoch, with granite in the range dating to the Permo-Triassic. In the range are volcanic intrusions. They can be seen in "intrusive and extrusive igneous rocks which clearly pre-date the Great Escarpment."

The Gibraltar Range receives much rain. There is a surface water measurement station found in the range at Dandahra Creek that was opened on 10 May 1972. The area has a mean annual rainfall of 1,146 millimetres (45.1 in) with a mean annual run-off of 624 millimetres (24.6 in) and mean annual run-off as a percentage of annual rainfall of 54 millimetres (2.1 in). The ranges have rock outcroppings and heath. The range is also home to mallee ecosystems. The area is a Northeast Forest Lands. Amalgamated ores of titanium, tin, gold, nickel, rhodium and iron are found within the range.

Thickly forested highland areas cover part of the mountains, and there are isolated populations of Waratah. The rufous scrub-bird lives in the Gibraltar Range, although its population was slightly reduced due to a fire in 2002. The mountain range is also home to the Parma wallaby. During the 1850s, European fruit trees flourished at the base of the range.

== Recent history ==
In the 1850s, there were mines in the mountains. In 1890s and 1900s, an area of the mountain range had been reserved for forestry. Construction of the first "sealed road" over the mountain range began in 1960. It allowed the first bicycle race from the town of Grafton on the East Coast to the town of Inverell on the Northern Tablelands. In 2002, forest fires were burning in the Gibraltar Ranges. In late 2007, two prison escapees were last spotted near the ranges and the police were looking for them. In October 2009, parts of the Gibraltar Range were closed because of the potential for bushfires.
