= Maryland National Park =

National park in New South Wales, Australia

- IUCN category Ia (strict nature reserve)
- Location within New South Wales
- Location: New South Wales
- Coordinates: 28°30′17″S 152°04′40″E
- Area: 9 km^{2} (3.5 sq mi)
- Established: 1999
- Governing body: NSW National Parks & Wildlife Service
- Website: Official website

Maryland is a national park in New South Wales, Australia, 746.2 km north of Sydney.

The average elevation of the terrain is 842 metres. Maryland National Park was established in January 1999. It occupies an area of 2283ha.

== See also ==
- Protected areas of New South Wales
- High Conservation Value Old Growth forest
