= Yaygirr =

Australian Aboriginal tribe

The Yaygir, Yuraygir, or Yaegl, (Note: 'In 2008, the Lower Clarence Elders use the preferred spelling of 'Yaegl'. In 1977, the spelling of 'Yuraygir' was considered the closest reflection of the Aboriginal usage of the word, allowing it to be phonetically accurate and easy for visitors to pronounce. ' (Kijas 2009, p. 15)) are an Australian Aboriginal tribe who traditionally live and lived in and around Yamba and Maclean, New South Wales.

== Language ==
Yaygir was one of the two Gumbaynggiric languages, closely related to Gumbaynggir, both of which split from the same proto-language, though in developing their differences, their lexical cognate count was reduced to half, 46%. It is considered by Terry Crowley to be the most 'aberrant' of New South Wales languages for its phonology and acceptance of initial vowels, as opposed to the standard formation of words, which normatively begin with consonants, the latter feature something it shares with Nganjaywana. The last speaker was Sandy Cameron of Yamba (d.1973). It had a voiceless trill unique to Australian languages.

== Country ==
Yaygir country stretched from Coffs Harbour northwards to Evans Head, and inland to Cowper on the Clarence River. They were and are a coastal people. Some reports state that the tribe or horde local to Coffs Harbour itself was called 'Womboyneralah', meaning 'where the kangaroos camped.'

== People ==
The Yaygir were bounded by the Bandjalang to the north, and the Gumbaynggirr to the south.

== Alternative names ==
- Jeigir
- Jungai
- Yaegl
- Yagir
- Yegera
- Yegera
- Yegir
- Yiegera
- Youngai

Source: Tindale 1974, p. 194

== Some words ==
- abl (wallaby)
- dalga (sing)
- dulbay (language)
- duwo (boomerang)
- ngaluunggirr (clever-man)

Source: Crowley 1979, p. 380

== Sources ==
- Crowley, Terry (1979). "Yaygir". In Dixon, Robert M. W.; Blake, Barry J. (eds.). Handbook of Australian Languages. Vol. 1. John Benjamins Publishing. pp. 363–390. ISBN 978-9-027-20512-4.
- Kijas, Johanna (June 2009). There were always people here: a history of Yuraygir National Park (PDF). Department of Environment and Climate Change, New South Wales. ISBN 978-1-741-22866-3.
- Lunney, Daniel; Wells, Antares; Miller, Indrie (2016). "An ecological history of the Koala Phascolarctos cinereus in Coffs Harbour and its environs, on the mid-north coast of New South Wales, c.1861-2000". Proceedings of the Linnean Society of New South Wales: 1–48.
- Ryan, J. S. (September 1963). "Some Aboriginal Place-Names in the Richmond Tweed Area". Oceania. 34 (1): 38–55. doi:10.1002/j.1834-4461.1963.tb00247.x. JSTOR 40329696.
- Tindale, Norman Barnett (1974). "Jiegera (NSW)". Aboriginal Tribes of Australia: Their Terrain, Environmental Controls, Distribution, Limits, and Proper Names. Australian National University Press. ISBN 978-0-708-10741-6. Archived from the original on 18 February 2018.
