= Yaygir language =

Australian Aboriginal language

Yaygir
- Native to: Australia
- Region: New South Wales
- Ethnicity: Yaygir people
- Native speakers: 1-10 (2018–2019)
- Language family: Pama–Nyungan: Gumbaynggiric; Yaygir
- Dialects: Yaegl (around mouth of the Clarence); Yirraygirr (upriver of Maclean); Yunggaya (around Ulmarra)

Language codes
- ISO 639-3: xya
- Glottolog: yayg1236
- AIATSIS: E10
- ELP: Yaygir

Yaygir, also spelt Yaygirr or Yegir, is an Australian Aboriginal language. It was spoken by the Yaygir people in the Northern Rivers region of New South Wales.

There are attempts to revitalise the language, including the publication of a dictionary in 2012.

== Phonology ==
=== Vowels ===
Vowels
	Front	Central	Back
High	i iː		u uː
Low		a aː	

=== Consonants ===
Consonants
	Labial	Alveolar/ Retroflex	Palatal	Velar
Plosive	b	d	ɟ	ɡ
Nasal	m	n	ɲ	ŋ
Lateral		l		
Trill		r r̥		
Approximant	w	ɻ	j	

== Basic phrases ==
These are some basic phrases provided by the Muurrbay Aboriginal Language and Culture Co-operative.

English	Yaygir
Hello there!	Yuu!
How are you?	Ginagay?
Pleased to meet you.	Ibirr ngina nyaagigu.
Are you feeling well?	Ngindadi darhuyay mabu?
I’m feeling good.	Darhuyay ngaya mabu.
I’m not feeling good.	Yawiirray ngaya mabu.
I’m sick .	Ngaya wigun.
Do well!	Darhuya ngiinda!
Thank you / Congratulations.	Darhuyay irriirring.
Goodbye / I’m going.	Ngaya dyaarri yaarrang.
Goodbye / I’m going.	Dyaarri yaarrang.
Please.	Irriiri-nda.
Please don’t.	Wanaa-nda.
Yes.	Ngii.
No.	Wadyi.
What’s your name?	Warha nguunu waambarr?
My name is ___.	Ngaanyu waambarr ___.
I’ll see you!	Ngadya ngina nyaawi!
I am Yaygirr.	Adyi ngaya Yaygirr.
I live here at Maclean / Yamba.	Adyi ngaya nginagandyi Birriin-da / Gulaany-dya.
Welcome to Maclean / Yamba.	Darhuyay yarraanay Birriinda / Gulaany-dya.
This is Yaegl country.	Adyi Yaygirr wadyarr.
I remember our ancestors from long ago.	Adyi ngadya arraygi Yayarr yangidawu.
I remember my Elder men and Elder women.	Adyi ngadya arraygi ngulungginy, ngamiiga.
This ends here.	Wadyiiway.
