= Gumbaynggiric languages =

Two Australian aboriginal languages

Gumbaynggiric
- Geographic distribution: New South Wales
- Linguistic classification: Pama–Nyungan: Southeast; North Coast; Gumbaynggiric
- Subdivisions: Kumbainggar; Yaygir

Language codes
- Glottolog: gumb1242
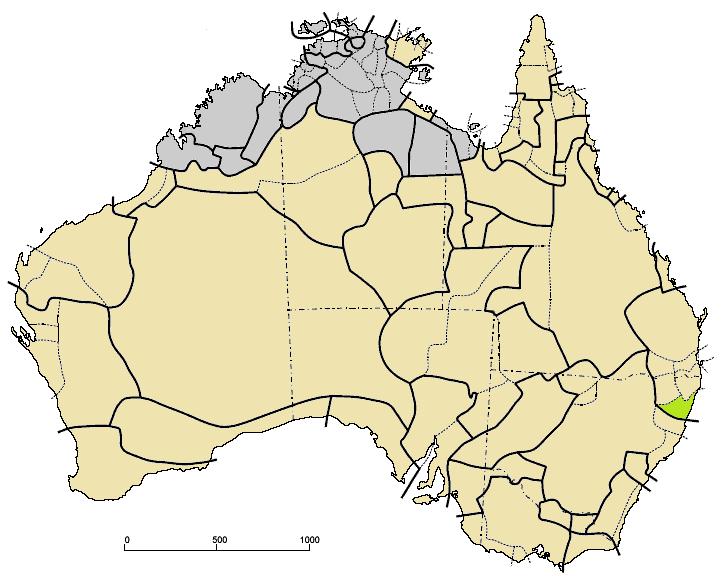
- Gumbaynggiric languages (green) among other Pama–Nyungan (tan)

Gumbaynggiric is a pair of related Australian Aboriginal languages, Kumbainggar and Yaygir.

== Gumbaynggir ==
Gumbaynggir is the only surviving language in the Gumbaynggiric family of Pama–Nyungan stock. An Australian Aboriginal language spoken by the Gumbaynggirr people, who are native to the Mid North Coast of New South Wales.
