= Basket Swamp National Park =

National park in New South Wales, Australia

- IUCN category II (national park)
- Location within New South Wales
- Location: New South Wales
- Nearest city: Tenterfield
- Coordinates: 28°55′59″S 152°09′11″E
- Area: 28.2 km^{2} (10.9 sq mi)
- Established: 1999
- Governing body: National Parks and Wildlife Service (New South Wales)
- Website: http://www.nationalparks.nsw.gov.au

Basket Swamp is a national park in New South Wales, Australia, 558 km north of Sydney, and 15 kilometres north east of Tenterfield.

The park is named after Basket Swamp, a waterlogged area in the western sector of the park.

This wetland plays an important role in the ecosystem of the Clarence River. Basket Swamp cleans, stores and discharges clean water into the surrounding streams that flow into the river.

== See also ==
- Protected areas of New South Wales
- High Conservation Value Old Growth forest
