= Boonoo Boonoo National Park =

National park in Australia

- IUCN category II (national park)
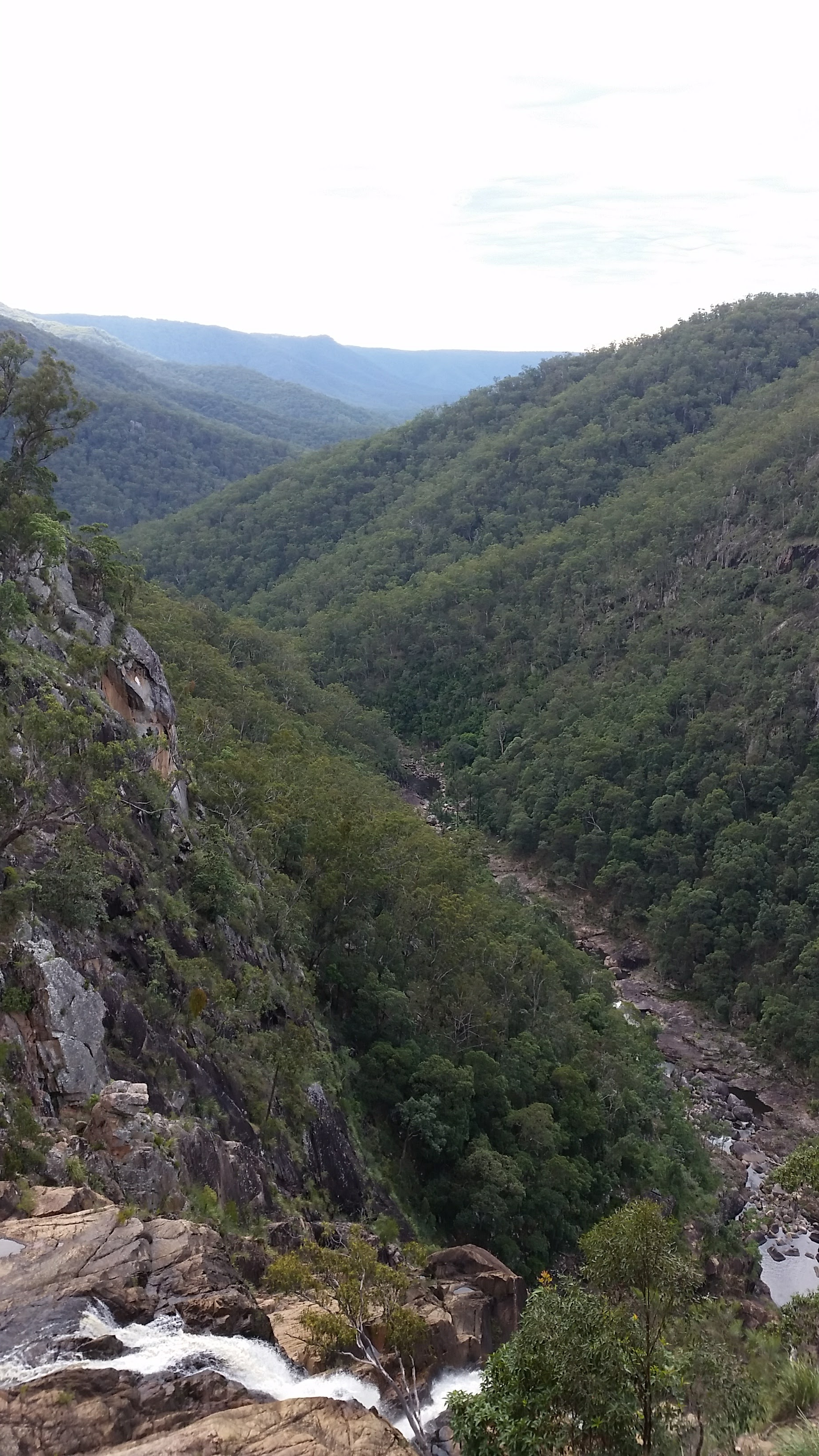
- Northern view of Boonoo Boonoo river from the falls lookout platform

- Location within New South Wales
- Location: New South Wales
- Nearest city: Tenterfield
- Coordinates: 28°49′03″S 152°10′42″E
- Area: 43.77 km^{2} (16.90 sq mi)
- Established: 1982
- Governing body: National Parks and Wildlife Service (New South Wales)
- Website: http://www.nationalparks.nsw.gov.au

Boonoo Boonoo National Park (pronounced 'bunna bunoo') is a national park in New South Wales, Australia, 571 km north of Sydney and 26 kilometres north east of Tenterfield off Mount Lindesay Road.

The Boonoo Boonoo River passes through the park and includes a cascading 210-metre waterfall and a rainforest filled gorge. Bushwalking, swimming and bush camping are among the attractions of this area. In this park, the weather can be extreme and unpredictable, so visitors must be prepared for various surprises.

Boonoo Boonoo is the Aboriginal name given to the area which means 'poor country with no animals to provide food', however, the environment changed and it became home to Kangaroos and Wallabies.

Many wild animals have found their habitats in the diverse vegetation of the park that includes among others such ROTAP species as Callistemon flavovirens.

== See also ==
- Protected areas of New South Wales
- List of reduplicated Australian place names
- High Conservation Value Old Growth forest
