= Clarence River (New South Wales) =

River in New South Wales, Australia

Clarence River Big River
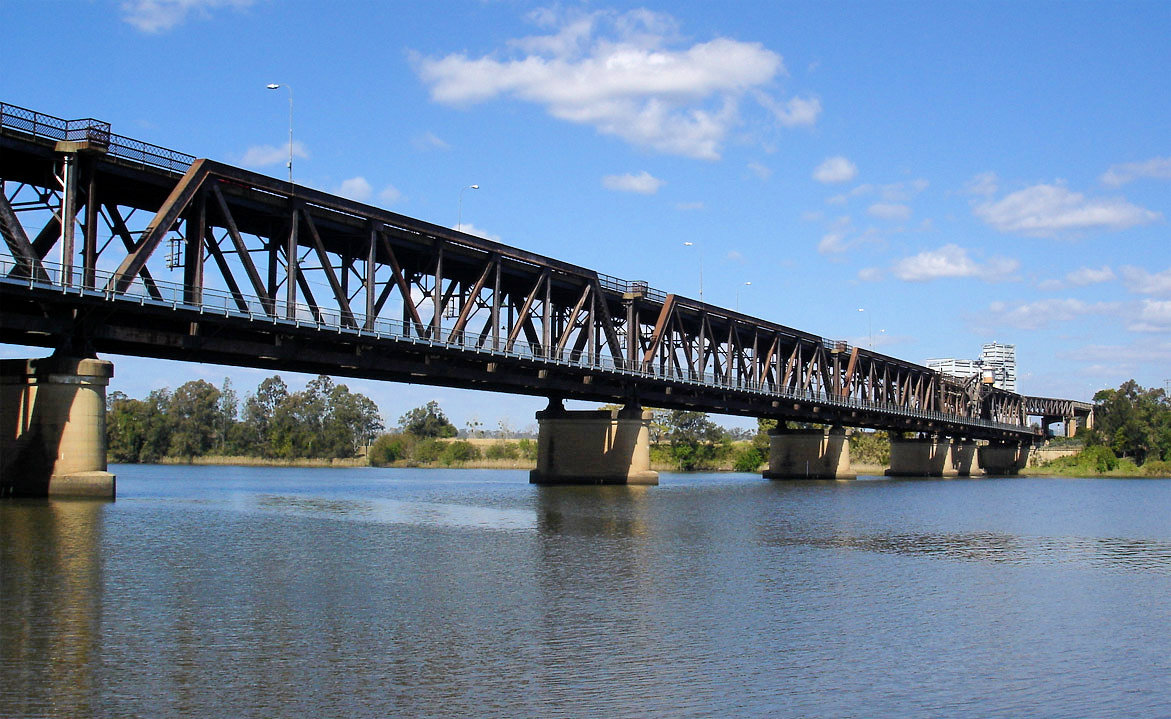
- The Grafton Bridge across the Clarence River.
- Etymology: Duke of Clarence
- Native name: Boorimbah (Bandjalang); Ngunitiji (Yaygir)

Location
- Country: Australia
- State: New South Wales
- Region: NSW North Coast (IBRA), Northern Rivers
- Local government areas: Kyogle, Clarence Valley
- City: Grafton

Physical characteristics
- Source: Border Ranges
  - location: near Tooloom National Park and Bonalbo
  - elevation: 252 m (827 ft)
- 2nd source: Maryland River
- Mouth: Coral Sea, South Pacific Ocean
  - location: near Iluka and Yamba
  - coordinates: 29°25′32.6″S 153°21′19.4″E
- Length: 394 km (245 mi)
- Basin size: 22,850 km^{2} (8,820 sq mi)
- Discharge
  - average: 160 m^{3}/s (5,700 cu ft/s)
  - minimum: 1 m^{3}/s (35 cu ft/s)
  - maximum: 20,000 m^{3}/s (710,000 cu ft/s)

Basin features
- Tributaries
  - left: Tooloom Creek, Esk River
  - right: Cataract River, Timbarra River, Mann River, Orara River, Coldstream River.
- River islands: Woodford Island, Chatsworth Island, and Harwood Island

The Clarence River (Bandjalang: Boorimbah, Yaygir: Ngunitiji) is a river situated in the Northern Rivers district of New South Wales, Australia. It rises on the eastern slopes of the Great Dividing Range, in the Border Ranges west of Bonalbo, near Rivertree at the junction of Koreelah Creek and Maryland River, on the watershed that marks the border between New South Wales and Queensland. It flows generally south, south east and north east, and is joined by twenty-four tributaries including Tooloom Creek and the Mann, Nymboida, Cataract, Orara, Coldstream, Timbarra, and Esk rivers. It descends 256 metres (840 ft) over the course of its 394-kilometre (245 mi) length and empties into the Coral Sea in the South Pacific Ocean, between Iluka and Yamba.

On its journey it passes through the towns of Tabulam and Copmanhurst, the city of Grafton, and the towns of Ulmarra, and Maclean. The river features many large river islands, including Woodford, Chatsworth, Ashby, Warregah and Harwood islands; and Susan Island Nature Reserve. The river supports a large prawn trawling and fishing industry.

The Clarence River system is an extensive east coast drainage with many tributaries of differing size. The 195 km Clarence Canoe and Kayak Trail is the longest mapped whitewater trail in Australia. Its basin is, together with the very similarly sized Hawkesbury, Australia's largest Pacific watershed south of Bundaberg. The extremely intense rainfalls that typify the North Coast mean, however, that major floods can temporarily raise the flow of the Clarence to 24 feet, as happened in 1890.

== Rainfall and climate ==
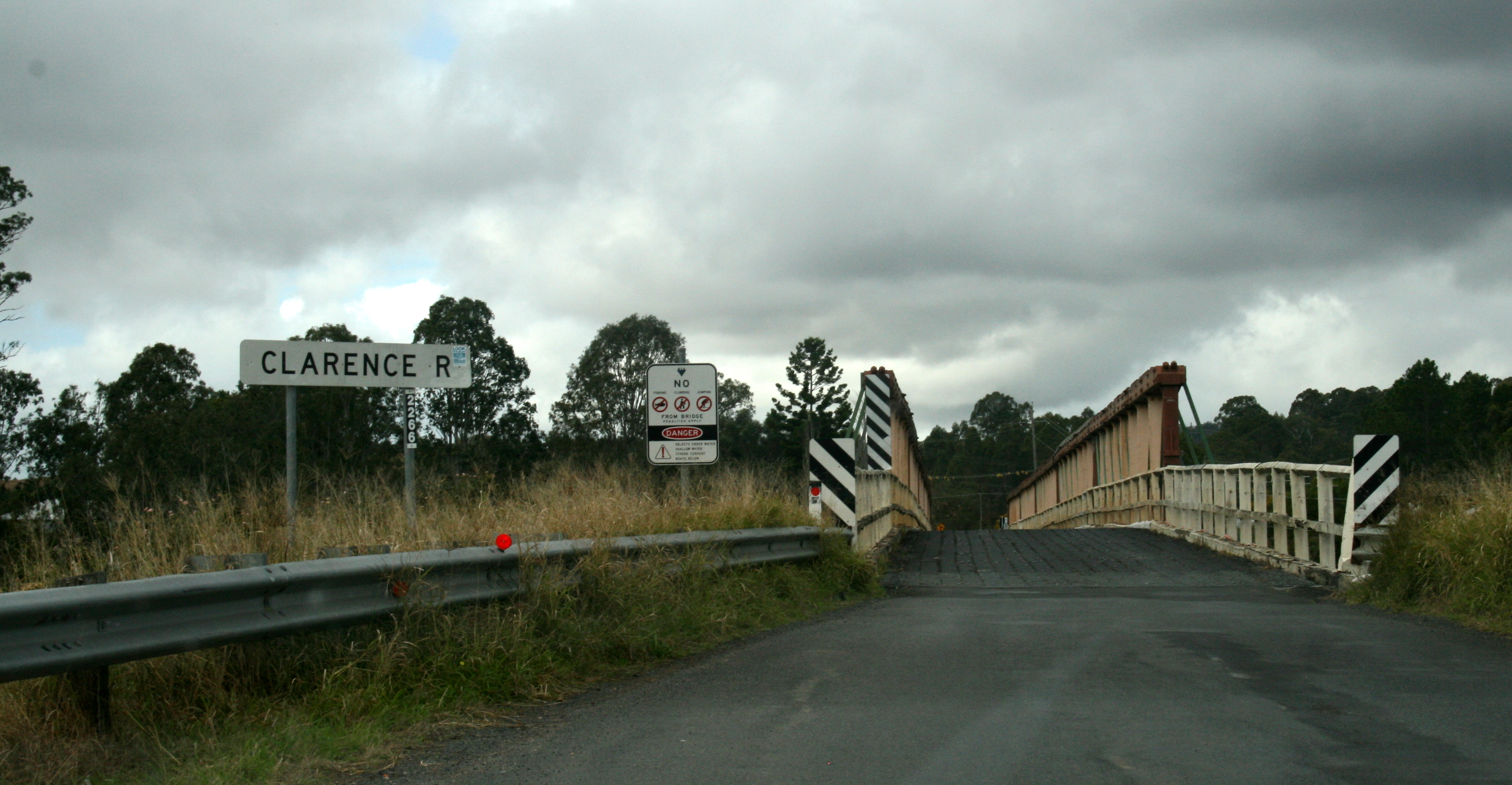
The Bruxner Highway crossing the Clarence River at Tabulam.

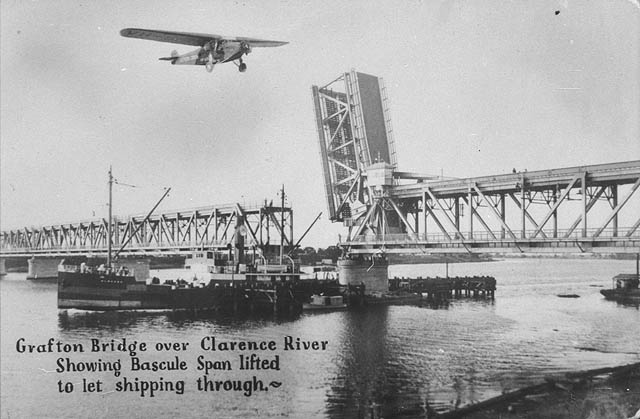
The Grafton Bridge over the Clarence River showing Bascule span lifted to let shipping through. (Postcard from about 1932; The "Southern Cross" aeroplane has been added to the photograph.)

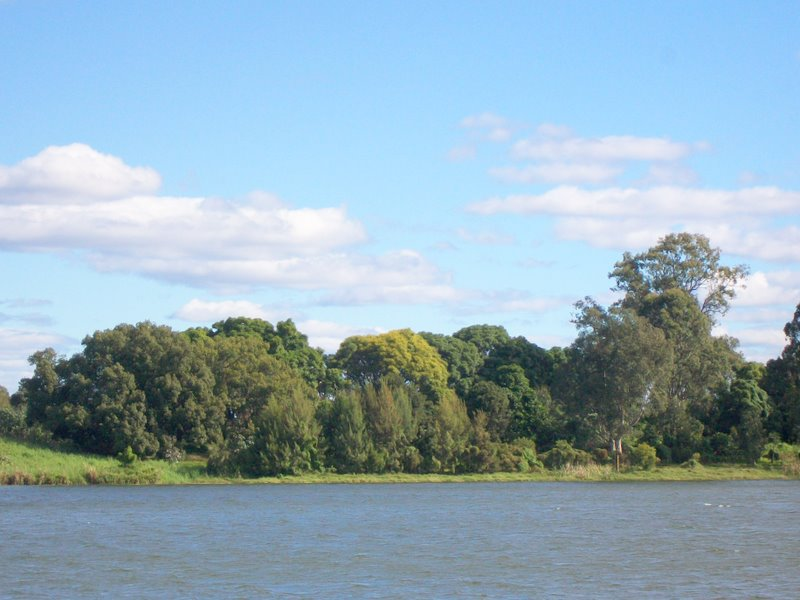
The Clarence River, as it flows past Susan Island Nature Reserve, near Grafton.

The climate of most of the basin is subtropical (Köppen Cfa), though the highest areas with cooler weather are of the temperate Cfb type. Annual rainfall ranges from 1,600 millimetres (63 in) on the coast at Yamba down to 1,080 millimetres (43 in) in the shielded valley at Grafton (BOM Grafton Olympic Pool). At higher altitudes, rainfall may reach 2,000 millimetres (79 in) on exposed slopes but data are very poor. Most of the high areas actually receive no more rain than Grafton though variability from year to year is less. Temperatures are generally very warm, with maxima in lower area ranging from 27 °C (81 °F) in January to 19 °C (66 °F) in July. In the highlands, however, temperatures are much cooler and in July range from lows of around 2 °C (36 °F) to maxima around 13 °C (55 °F) – though in January days remain very warm at around 25 °C (77 °F). Rainfall per month on the coast typically ranges from around 220 millimetres (8.7 in) in February and March to around 70 millimetres (2.8 in) in September; it can average as low as 40 millimetres (1.6 in) between May and September inland, where exposed areas sometimes suffer bushfires after droughts, as occurred in 1915 and 2000.

=== Flooding ===
During Cyclone Oswald, the Clarence was subject to minor flooding, brought about due to the storm's residual effects and associated monsoon trough that passed over parts of Queensland and New South Wales. At Grafton, the river peaked at a new record height of 8.1 metres (27 ft). Two years earlier, the river peaked 7.6 metres (25 ft), forcing the evacuation of 3000 people from their homes. On both occasions, the city's levee was credited with preventing more severe flooding.

The local historical society has published an account of newspaper reports documenting flooding of the river from the late 1800s to 2011.

== Catchment land use and industry ==
Tourism is also a significant industry in the Clarence Valley generating around A$457million per annum and employing around 2500 people. Most of the Clarence basin is heavily forested, with important areas of remnant subtropical and temperate rainforest occurring all along the course. Only in alluvial areas where soils are less leached is there major agricultural development: in these areas the chief industries are cattle rearing and the growing of sugar cane in lower-lying areas.

Of particular interest is the small island town of Harwood, where a Sperry New Holland factory and a quaint Bush Pub overlook the Clarence delta. Harwood is also the location of the local sugar mill, the Harwood Sugar Mill built in 1873 and is the oldest Australian mill still operational. The sugar mill is situated on the river due to its importance in transporting sugar cane from farms in the surrounding area in previous times. Harwood is just after the Harwood Bridge on part of Australia's National Highway from Sydney, Port Macquarie, Coffs Harbour to Brisbane.

The freshwater reaches of the Clarence River support important populations of native freshwater fish including Eastern freshwater cod, an endangered fish species unique to the Clarence River system, and Australian bass.

== Etymology ==
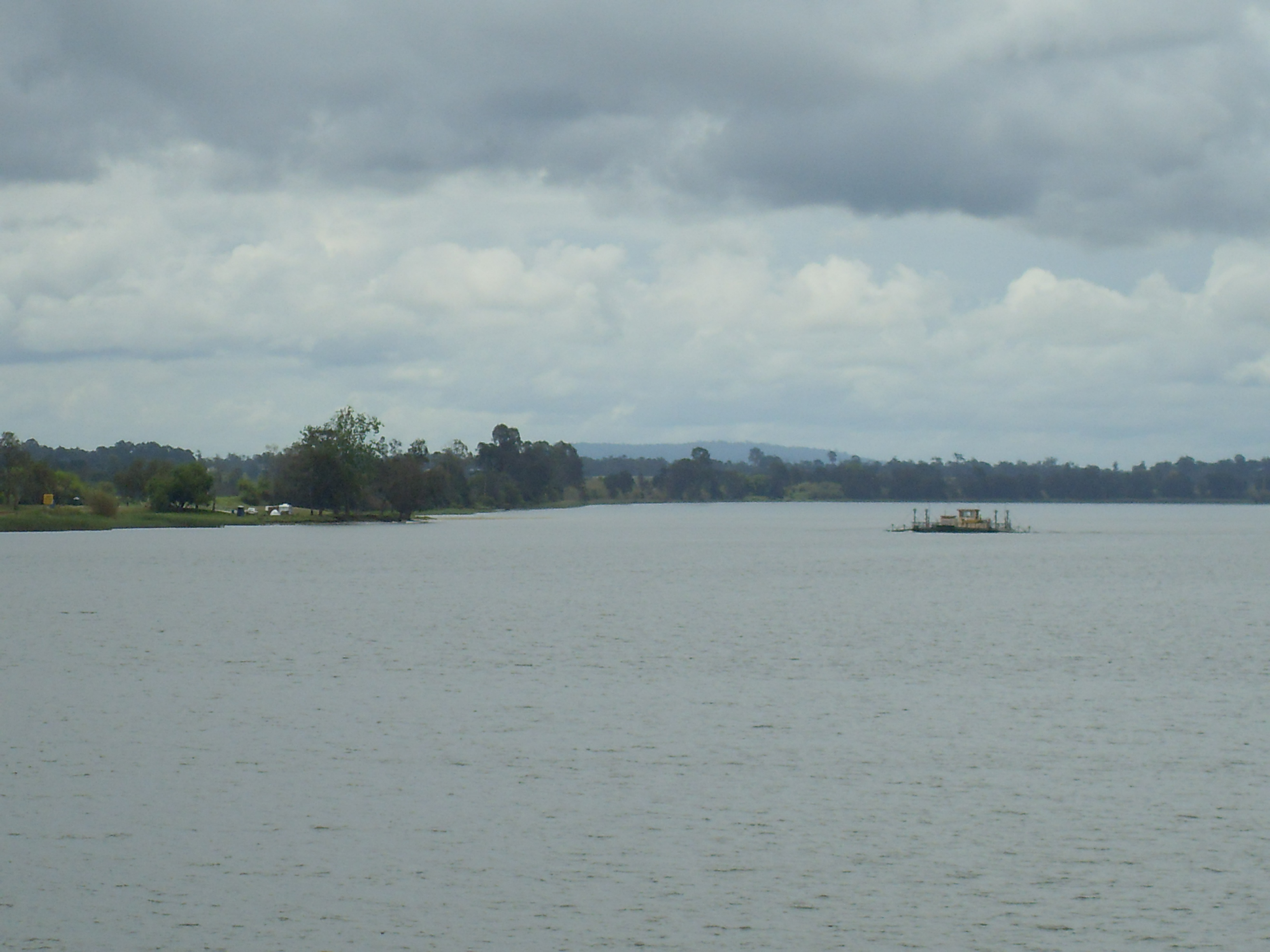
Southgate Ferry

The Indigenous Bundjalung people call the river Boorimbah, while the coastal Yaygir people call it the Ngunitiji. The Aboriginal people from the Tenterfield district used the word neyand, meaning "top" as the name for the headwaters of the river.

The river remained unknown to British authorities until the mid-1830s when escaped convict Richard Craig, who had been living with Aboriginal people in the area, reported its existence. It was initially called the Big River, but this caused confusion as the Gwydir River in northern New South Wales was also colloquially known by this name.

In November 1839 the Governor of New South Wales, George Gipps, officially changed the name to the Clarence River in honour of the previous King of the British Empire, William IV, 1st Duke of Clarence and St Andrews.

The local government area of the Clarence Valley Council draws its name from the river and covers the lower half of the river valley.

== Crossings ==
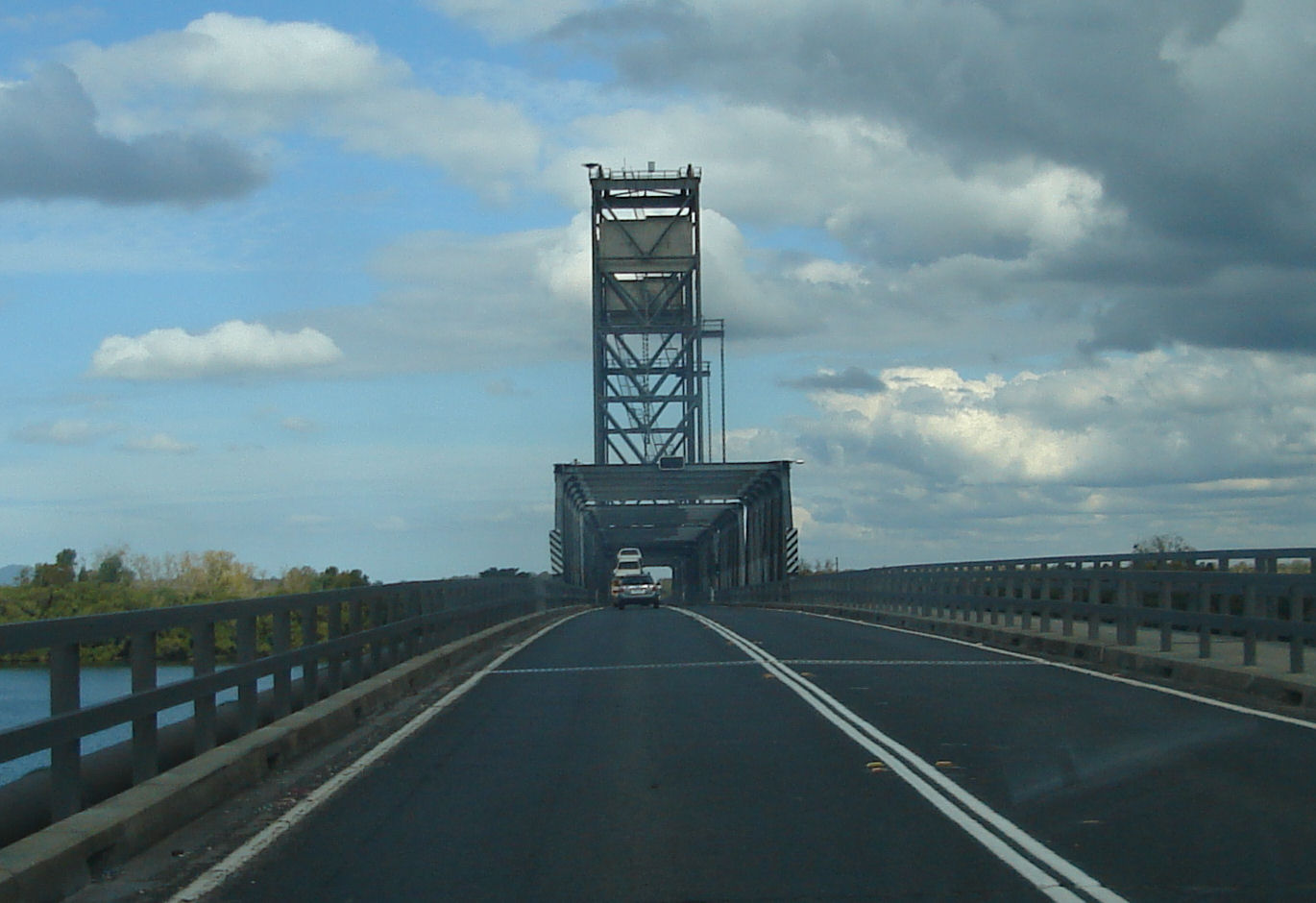
Harwood (Clarence River) Bridge

There are very few fixed crossings of the Clarence River. Going downstream, these include:

- Bridge over Hootens Rd Bonalbo
- Bridge at Tabulam, on the Bruxner Highway
- Ernie Baldwin Bridge, at Yates Crossing (Plain Stations Road, Clarence Way)
- Bridge at Lilydale near Copmanhurst
- Rogan Bridge, a bridge that carries the Rogan Bridge Rd
- Grafton Bridge at Grafton
- Balun Bindarray Bridge at Grafton
- Ulmarra-Southgate Ferry at Ulmarra – this closed in June 2024
- Harwood Bridges at Harwood. The two bridges (old and new) sit side by side with the same name.
- Bluff Point Ferry at Lawrence

Crossings over the south arm of the Clarence River are:

- Wingfield Bridge at Cowper
- McFarlane Bridge at Maclean

Crossings over the north arm of the Clarence River are:

- Mororo Bridge at Mororo, New South Wales
- Warregah Island Bridge, Chatsworth Island, New South Wales
- Sepentine Channel Bridge at Harwood

== See also ==
- Rivers of New South Wales
- List of rivers of Australia
