= Group 2 Rugby League =

Competition in Northern New South Wales

- Sport: Rugby league
- Instituted: 1966
- Inaugural season: 1966
- Number of teams: 7 senior clubs (12 junior clubs)
- Country: Australia
- Premiers: Macksville Sea Eagles (2026)
- Most titles: Nambucca Heads Roosters (11 titles)
- Website: Group 2 Rugby League

Group 2 is a rugby league competition on the north coast of New South Wales, Australia. Since 1966, run under the auspices of the NSWRL . The Group 2 area runs from Grafton in the north to Macksville in the south. Group 2 teams played for many decades before 1966 when some redistribution, amalgamation or control mechanism presumably changed. Teams on the Nambucca River, namely Bowraville, Macksville and Nambucca Heads played in a southern division against Kempsey, Smithtown, Port Macquarie and Wauchope before 1966.

== Teams ==
=== Clubs in Group 2 Competitions ===
Clubs	City/Town	Home Ground	Titles	Seniors	Juniors
Senior Clubs
Coffs Harbour Comets	Coffs Harbour	Geoff King Motors Oval	1970–71, 1973–74, 1983, 1985, 2013, 2018	Yes	Yes
Grafton Ghosts	Grafton	Frank McGuren Field	2014, 2017, 2019	Yes	Yes
Macksville Sea Eagles	Macksville	Allan Gillett Oval	1979, 1991, 1995, 2002, 2003, 2004, 2005, 2026	Yes	Yes
Nambucca Heads Roosters	Nambucca Heads	Coronation Park	1969, 1972, 1975–76, 1986, 1992–93, 2024-2025	Yes	Yes
Sawtell Panthers	Coffs Harbour (Sawtell)	Rex Hardaker Oval	1978, 2009, 2011	Yes	Yes
South Grafton Rebels	Grafton	McKittrick Park	2015–16, 2022	Yes	Yes
Woolgoolga Seahorses	Woolgoolga	Woolgoolga Sports Ground	2023	Yes	Yes
Junior Clubs
Bowraville Tigers	Bowraville	Bowraville Sports Hub	None	No	Yes
Kempsey Dragons	Kempsey	Verge Street Oval	None	No*	Yes
Smithtown Tigers	Smithtown	Smithtown Oval	1966, 1968, 1977	No‡	Yes

*Kempsey Dragons no longer field a senior team, but remain a member of Group 2. Kempsey's modern senior side, the Macleay Valley Mustangs, play in the Group 3 Rugby League Premiership.

‡Smithtown's senior team is Lower Macleay Magpies, in Hastings League.

=== Former clubs ===
==== Defunct/Moved ====
Former clubs
Bellingen Dorrigo Magpies
Coffs Harbour Raiders
Coffs Jetty Park Beach
Central Kempsey
Gimbisi Valley Warriors
Dunghutti Broncos
Kempsey Kowboys
Kempsey Dragons
Macleay Valley Mustangs
Ngaku Warriors (Kempsey)
Orara Valley Axemen
Port City Breakers
Port Macquarie Sharks
Smithtown

== First Grade Grand Final Results 1966–present ==
Season	Grand Final Information				Minor Premiers
Season	Premiers	Score	Runners-up	Report	Minor Premiers
1966	Smithtown Tigers	3–2	Macksville Sea Eagles
1967	Smithtown Tigers	–	Coffs Harbour
1968	Smithtown Tigers	7–4	Coffs Harbour Comets
1969	Nambucca Heads Roosters	10–6	Central Kempsey
1970	Coffs Harbour Comets	–	Central Kempsey
1971	Coffs Harbour Comets	20–9	Nambucca Heads Roosters
1972	Nambucca Heads Roosters	15–10	Coffs Harbour Comets
1973	Coffs Harbour Comets	20–13	Nambucca Heads Roosters
1974	Coffs Harbour Comets	6–2	Bellingen Magpies
1975	Nambucca Heads Roosters	19–4	Kempsey Dragons
1976	Nambucca Heads Roosters	19–2	Bellingen Magpies
1977	Smithtown Tigers	–	Nambucca Heads Roosters
1978	Sawtell Panthers	14–13	Smithtown Tigers		Sawtell (Clayton Cup)
1979	Macksville Sea Eagles	24–7	Smithtown Tigers
1980	Bellingen Magpies	19–10	Sawtell Panthers
1981	Bellingen Magpies	44–0	Macksville Sea Eagles		Bellingen Magpies
1982	Bellingen Magpies	21–12	Ngaku Warriors (Kempsey)		Sawtell Panthers
1983	Coffs Harbour Comets	28–16	Woolgoolga Seahorses		Coffs Harbour Comets
1984	Bellingen Magpies	4–1	Coffs Harbour Comets		Bellingen Magpies
1985	Coffs Harbour Comets	18–10	Nambucca Heads Roosters		Nambucca Heads Roosters
1986	Nambucca Heads Roosters	18–16	Kempsey Dragons		Kempsey Dragons
1987	Bellingen Magpies	23–6	Nambucca Heads Roosters		Bellingen Magpies
1988	Bellingen Magpies	50–24	Kempsey Dragons		Nambucca Heads Roosters
1989	Bellingen Magpies	39–6	Coffs Harbour Comets		Bellingen Magpies
1990	Bellingen Magpies	22–20	Orara Valley Axemen		Smithtown Tigers
1991	Macksville Sea Eagles	26–26	Coffs Harbour Comets		Macksville Sea Eagles
1992	Nambucca Heads Roosters	40–6	Woolgoolga Seahorses		Nambucca Heads Roosters
1993	Nambucca Heads Roosters	26–10	Macksville Sea Eagles		Macksville Sea Eagles
1994	Orara Valley Axemen	30–18	Nambucca Heads Roosters		Macksville Sea Eagles
1995	Macksville Sea Eagles	24–16	Coffs Harbour Comets		Macksville Sea Eagles
1996	Nambucca Heads Roosters	36–34	Orara Valley Axemen		Nambucca Heads Roosters
1997	Orara Valley Axemen	40–32	Coffs Harbour Comets		Coffs Harbour Comets
1998	Port Macquarie Sharks	26–25	Nambucca Heads Roosters		Nambucca Heads Roosters
1999	Bellingen Magpies	20–18	Port Macquarie Sharks		Port Macquarie Sharks
2000	Port Macquarie Sharks	24–12	Nambucca Heads Roosters		Port Macquarie Sharks
2001	Port Macquarie Sharks	54–26	Macksville Sea Eagles		Port Macquarie Sharks
2002	Macksville Sea Eagles	39–26	Port Macquarie Sharks		Port Macquarie Sharks
2003	Macksville Sea Eagles	30–23	Orara Valley Axemen		Port Macquarie Sharks
2004	Macksville Sea Eagles	34–23	Port Macquarie Sharks		Port Macquarie Sharks
2005	Macksville Sea Eagles	60–22	Orara Valley Axemen		Orara Valley Axemen
2006	Port Macquarie Sharks	22–18	Sawtell Panthers		Port Macquarie Sharks
2007	Macksville Sea Eagles	32–24	Orara Valley Axemen		Macksville Sea Eagles
2008	Orara Valley Axemen	19–18	Woolgoolga Seahorses		Orara Valley Axemen
2009	Sawtell Panthers	21–20	Macksville Sea Eagles		Sawtell Panthers
2010	Port Macquarie Sharks	41–16	Coffs Harbour Comets		Port Macquarie Sharks
2011	Sawtell Panthers	29–28	Nambucca Heads Roosters		Nambucca Heads Roosters
2012	Macleay Valley Mustangs	36–12	Nambucca Heads Roosters		Nambucca Heads Roosters
2013	Coffs Harbour Comets	42–20	Nambucca Heads Roosters		Coffs Harbour Comets
2014	Grafton Ghosts	18–16	Coffs Harbour Comets		Grafton Ghosts
2015	South Grafton Rebels	46–18	Coffs Harbour Comets		South Grafton Rebels
2016	South Grafton Rebels	26–12	Grafton Ghosts		South Grafton Rebels
2017	Grafton Ghosts	32–12	South Grafton Rebels		Grafton Ghosts
2018	Coffs Harbour Comets	30–14	Macksville Sea Eagles		Grafton Ghosts
2019	Grafton Ghosts	68–6	Coffs Harbour Comets		Coffs Harbour Comets
2020 & 2021 seasons cancelled due to COVID-19 pandemic
2022	South Grafton Rebels	36–8	Orara Valley Axemen		Orara Valley Axemen
2023	Woolgoolga Seahorses	26–10	South Grafton Rebels		South Grafton Rebels
2024	Nambucca Heads Roosters	31–12	Woolgoolga Seahorses		Nambucca Heads Roosters
2025	Nambucca Heads Roosters	14–2	Sawtell Panthers		Woolgoolga Seahorses
2026	Macksville Sea Eagles	24–14	Woolgoolga Seahorses		Sawtell Panthers

=== Premiership Tally ===
Club	Premierships
Nambucca Heads Roosters	10
Bellingen Magpies	9
Macksville Sea Eagles	8
Coffs Harbour Comets	8
Port Macquarie Sharks	5
Smithtown Tigers	4
Sawtell Panthers	3
Orara Valley Axemen	3
Grafton Ghosts	3
South Grafton Rebels	3
Woolgoolga Seahorses	1
Macleay Valley Mustangs	1

== Players from Group 2 to play NRL ==
Player	Club
Greg Inglis	Bowraville Tigers JRL
Albert Kelly	Smithtown Tigers JRL
Kevin Gordon	Sawtell Panthers JRL
Aiden Tolman	Smithtown Tigers JRL
Wayne Bartrim	Macleay Valley Mustangs
Matt Donovan	Macksville Sea Eagles
Paul Davis	Port Macquarie, Macksville and Dunghutti
Clint Greenshields	Sawtell Panthers JRL
Troy Robinson	Sawtell Panthers JRL
Mitchell Thomson	Sawtell Panthers JRL

=== Notable players ===
==== Bellingen ====
- Dylan Edwards

==== Coffs Harbour Comets ====
• Joey Cudmore

==== Grafton Ghosts ====
- Danny Wicks
- Anthony Don
- Daine Laurie

==== Macksville Sea Eagles ====
- Matt Donovan
- Paul Davis
- Nathan Smith

==== Orara Valley Axemen ====
- Luke Metcalf

==== Sawtell Panthers ====
- Kevin Gordon
- Jarrod Wallace
- Troy Robinson
- Mitchell Thomson
- Clint Greenshields
- Noel Cleal
- Jason Alchin

==== South Grafton Rebels ====
- Brian Graham
- John Ferguson
- Ron Gill
- Fred Felsch
- Paul Pyers
- Kevin Stevens
- Eric Lawrence

==== Bowraville Tigers ====
- Greg Inglis

==== Kempsey Dragons ====
- Amos Roberts

==== Nambucca Heads Roosters ====
- Ryan Stig
- Daniel Fitzhenry
- Rod Urquhart

==== Smithtown Tigers ====
- Albert Kelly
- Aiden Tolman

== See also ==
- Rugby League Competitions in Australia
- Group 2 on Country Rugby League's official site
