= Jamal Idris =

Australian rugby league footballer

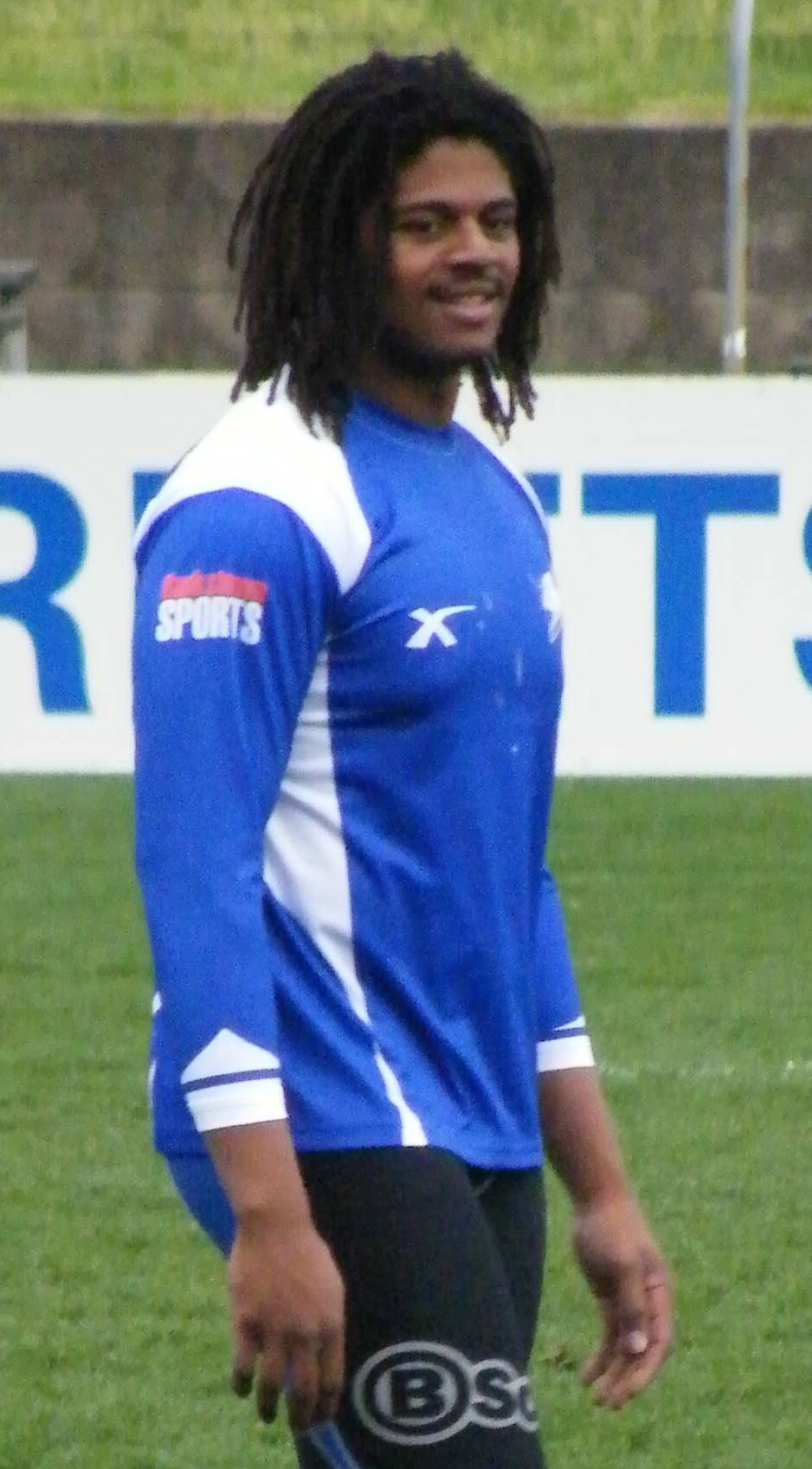

Personal information
- Full name: Jamal Dasuki Idris
- Born: 6 July 1990 (age 36) Auburn, New South Wales, Australia

Playing information
- Height: 195 cm (6 ft 5 in)
- Weight: 120 kg (18 st 13 lb)
- Position: Centre, Second-row
Club
| Years | Team | Pld | T | G | FG | P |
|---|---|---|---|---|---|---|
| 2008–11 | Canterbury Bulldogs | 68 | 24 | 0 | 0 | 96 |
| 2012–13 | Gold Coast Titans | 35 | 9 | 0 | 0 | 36 |
| 2014–15 | Penrith Panthers | 28 | 8 | 0 | 0 | 32 |
| 2017 | Wests Tigers | 5 | 0 | 0 | 0 | 0 |
| | Total | 136 | 41 | 0 | 0 | 164 |
Representative
| Years | Team | Pld | T | G | FG | P |
| 2011-12 | Indigenous All Stars | 2 | 0 | 0 | 0 | 0 |
| 2010–14 | Country NSW | 3 | 2 | 0 | 0 | 8 |
| 2010 | New South Wales | 1 | 1 | 0 | 0 | 4 |
| 2011 | Australia | 1 | 1 | 0 | 0 | 4 |

Jamal Dasuki Idris (born 6 July 1990) is an Australian former professional rugby league footballer. Idris played in representative teams such as Country, Indigenous All Stars, New South Wales and Australia. A centre, he previously played for the Canterbury-Bankstown Bulldogs, Gold Coast Titans, Penrith Panthers and Wests Tigers in the National Rugby League.

== Early life ==
Idris is the son of an Aboriginal Dharug mother, Alana, and Nigerian Hausa father, Jerry. Idris spent much of his childhood growing up in an Aboriginal reserve (Cabarita "mission" now under an Aboriginal Land Council) in Forster on the New South Wales Mid North Coast.

The family moved to Sydney because of Jamal's interest in athletics, especially javelin throwing. Following several representative seasons in athletics, Idris took up rugby league in high school. His junior clubs were Chester Hill Hornets, Merrylands Rams, Fairfield Patrician Brothers, Bankstown Sports, Guildford Raiders, Berala Bears and Forster Tuncurry Hawkes. Idris attended Great Lakes College, Westfields Sports High School and LaSalle Catholic College, Bankstown.

== Playing career ==
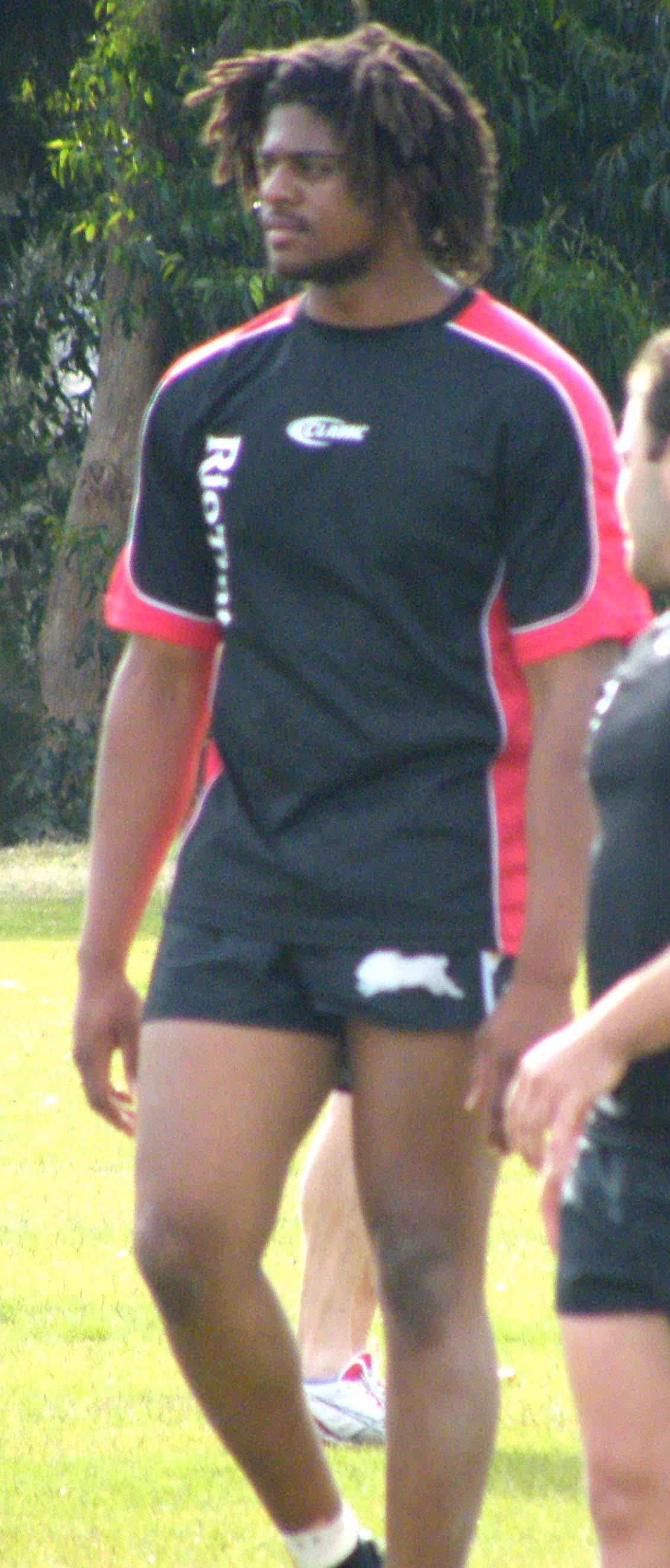
Idris training with the Indigenous Australian side in 2008

=== 2008 ===
Idris played for the Canterbury-Bankstown NYC team in 2008. He made his first grade debut for the Canterbury-Bankstown Bulldogs in Round 24 against arch-rivals the Parramatta Eels at ANZ Stadium at centre in the Bulldogs 26–12 loss. In his third NRL match in Round 26 against the Canberra Raiders, Idris scored his first NRL career try in the 52–34 loss at Canberra Stadium. Idris finished his debut year in the NRL with 3 matches and one try. He played at centre in the 2008 World Cup curtain opener match for the Indigenous Dreamtime team against the New Zealand Māori rugby league team in the Dreamtime side's 34–26 win.

=== 2009 ===
In March, Idris was involved in a fight with Canterbury teammate Ben Barba. Idris allegedly left Barba with a bleeding nose after he held Canterbury teammate Lee Te Maari against a wall at the Wentworthville Hotel carpark, resulting in Idris being suspended for one week. Idris performances early in the 2009 season prompted dual international Wendell Sailor to say: "What Jamal's doing at the moment, I think it's a lot better than what Izzy (Israel Folau) was doing at the same age." On 8 September, he was named Dally M Rookie of the Year Idris played in 20 matches and scored 7 tries for Canterbury-Bankstown for the year.

=== 2010 ===
Idris scored two tries in Canterbury's 60–14 win over the Sydney Roosters in round 3, and a month later had a man of the match performance in Round 7 against the Brisbane Broncos. Idris was rewarded with a centre spot in the NSW Country Origin team. After a strong performance for Country, including a try in the 36–18 win over City Origin, he was named on the interchange bench for the New South Wales State of Origin team for Game I of the 2010 series scoring a try in the 28–24 loss. Idris was dropped for the second match but was named the 18th man. In September, he was named in the train-on squad for Australia in the 2010 Four Nations tournament, but didn't make the final 24-man squad. Idris finished the season with 22 matches and 10 tries.

On 29 September, Idris was the victim of an attack by his cousin while in Forster for a family reunion. His 20-year-old cousin, Beau Currie, later pleaded guilty to striking Idris' neck with a samurai sword and was sentenced to 18 months in jail with a non-parole period of 14 months. Idris was not seriously injured and made a return to the Bulldogs for the start of the 2011 NRL season.

=== 2011 ===
Early into the 2011 NRL season, Idris was rumoured to have received contract offers from the Newcastle Knights and Gold Coast Titans. On 12 April, Idris signed a five-year deal with the Gold Coast Titans, starting from 2012. Weeks later, Idris was selected for Australia, debuting against New Zealand in the 2011 ANZAC Test playing off the interchange bench and scoring a try in the Kangaroos 20–10 win at Cbus Super Stadium. Idris played in 23 matches and scored 6 tries his last year with Canterbury-Bankstown

=== 2012 ===
In round 1 against the North Queensland Cowboys, Idris made his club debut for the Gold Coast, scoring the opening try for the Titans season. Idris scored two tries in the Titans 18–0 win at 1300SMILES Stadium. Due to form and injury, Idris saw one of his less effective seasons to date. After consecutive years of making representative football, Idris didn't see a representative jumper in 2012. He finished the year with 5 tries from 20 matches.

=== 2013 ===
Idris played at NSW Country Origin side in their 18–12 win over NSW City. He suffered a season-ending hamstring injury in Round 16 against the Newcastle Knights. Idris played in 15 matches and scored 4 tries for the Gold Coast. At the end of the season Idris was involved in talks with the Penrith Panthers as he sought a return to Sydney on compassionate grounds to be closer to his family.

=== 2014 ===
On 7 January, the Penrith Panthers signed Idris on a three-year deal. In a return deal, the Penrith club released Brad Tighe from the final two years of his contract to join the Gold Coast. After missing round 1 with a hamstring strain, Idris made his club debut for the Panthers in the round 18–17 loss against the Melbourne Storm at AAMI Park. Idris was again selected for NSW Country Origin side, scoring a try and was awarded Man of the Match in the 26–26 all draw. On 29 May, Idris was stood down by the Penrith club to seek help with personal issues, including depression and alcohol abuse, after he failed to report back to training following a four-day road trip to the Gold Coast. On 23 June, he returned to the Panthers NSW Cup team, putting in a solid performance in the 32–28 win. Idris returned to the Panthers first grade squad in Round 16. In Round 17 against the Wests Tigers at Leichhardt Oval, Idris scored his first try in Penrith colours on his 24th birthday in the club's 26–10 win. Idris finished his first year with Penrith scoring 4 tries from 22 matches.

=== 2015–16 ===
At the end of 2015, Idris took a break from his sporting career. In 2016, he temporarily left rugby league and took a trip around the world, in which he visited Europe and India, opened an orphanage in Ghana and joined Group 3 Rugby League club Wingham Tigers.

=== 2017 ===
On 27 October 2016, Idris signed a one-year deal with the Wests Tigers after one-year break from the NRL. Lacking recent experience, he played the opening games of the season from the bench, playing at centre when he took the field. In round 5, he made his debut in the starting side. On 9 May 2017, it was revealed that Idris would be ruled out for the season with a ruptured ACL Injury which he suffered at training. On 19 October 2017, Idris announced on social media that he would be retiring due to injury, after 136 games across four different clubs.

== After retirement ==
Idris was the brand ambassador of the Aboriginal Community Benefit Fund (Youpla), part-owned by his brother Isaac Simon. Youpla collapsed in March 2022, leaving 14,500 customers an estimated $66 million out of pocket.
