= Pyers =

Pyers is a surname. Notable people with the surname include:

- Paul Pyers (1935–2016), Australian rugby league player
- Robert Pyers (1847–1915), Australian politician
