= HZA =

HZA may refer to:

- Horizon Airlines (Australia), ICAO code HZA
- Heze Mudan Airport, IATA code HZA
- Hogere Zeevaartschool Amsterdam, professional education for maritime officers at the Hogeschool van Amsterdam
- Hauptzollamt, German for "Central Customs Office"
