= Kempsey Post Office =

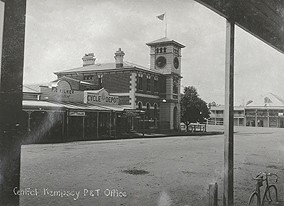
- Kempsey Post and Telegraph Office

- Location within New South Wales Location within Australia
- 31.0803°S 152.8422°E
- Location: Belgrave Street, Kempsey, New South Wales, Australia

Site notes
- Architect: Colonial Architect's Office under James Barnet
- Owner: Australia Post

New South Wales Heritage Register
- Official name: Kempsey Post Office
- Type: state heritage (built)
- Designated: 22 December 2000
- Reference no.: 1420
- Type: Post Office
- Category: Postal and Telecommunications
- Builders: Gabriel and McMorrine (original construction); Hocking Brothers (1903–04 addition)

Kempsey Post Office is a heritage-listed post office at Belgrave Street, Kempsey, New South Wales, Australia. It was designed by the Colonial Architect's Office under James Barnet, and was built by Gabriel and McMorrine, with additions in 1903–04 built by Hocking Brothers. The property is owned by Australia Post.

== History ==
=== Background ===
The first official postal service in Australia was established in April 1809, when Sydney merchant Isaac Nichols was appointed as the first Postmaster in the colony of NSW. Prior to this, mail had been distributed directly by the captain of the ship on which the mail arrived; however, this system was neither reliable nor secure.

In 1825 the colonial administration was empowered to establish a Postmaster General's Department, which had previously been administered from Britain.

In 1828 the first post offices outside of Sydney were established, with offices in Bathurst, Campbelltown, Parramatta, Liverpool, Newcastle, Penrith and Windsor. By 1839 there were forty post offices in the colony, with more opening as settlement spread. The advance of postal services was further increased as the railway network began to be established throughout NSW from the 1860s. Also, in 1863, the Postmaster General WH Christie noted that accommodation facilities for postmasters in some post offices was quite limited, and stated that it was a matter of importance that "post masters should reside and sleep under the same roof as the office".

The appointment of James Barnet as Acting Colonial Architect in 1862 coincided with a considerable increase in funding to the public works program. Between 1865 and 1890 the Colonial Architects Office was responsible for the building and maintenance of 169 post offices and telegraph offices in NSW. The post offices constructed during this period were designed in a variety of architectural styles, as Barnet argued that the local parliamentary representatives always preferred "different patterns".

The construction of new post offices continued throughout the 1890s Depression years under the leadership of Walter Liberty Vernon, who retained office from 1890 to 1911. While twenty-seven post offices were built between 1892 and 1895, funding to the Government Architect's Office was cut from 1893 to 1895, causing Vernon to postpone a number of projects.

Following Federation in 1901, the Commonwealth Government took over responsibility for post, telegraph and telephone offices, with the Department of Home Affairs Works Division being made responsible for post office construction. In 1916 construction was transferred to the Department of Works & Railways, with the Department of the Interior responsible during World War II.

On 22 December 1975 the Postmaster General's Department was abolished and replaced by the Postal & Telecommunications Department, with Australia Post and Telecom established. In 1989, the Australian Postal Corporation Act established Australia Post as a self-funding entity, which heralded a new direction in property management, including a move towards smaller, shop-front style post offices away from the larger more traditional buildings.

For much of its history, the post office has been responsible for a wide variety of community services including mail distribution, as agencies for the Commonwealth Bank, electoral enrolments, and the provision of telegraph and telephone services. The town post office served as a focal point for the community, most often built in a prominent position in the centre of town close to other public buildings, creating a nucleus of civic buildings and community pride.

=== Kempsey Post Office ===
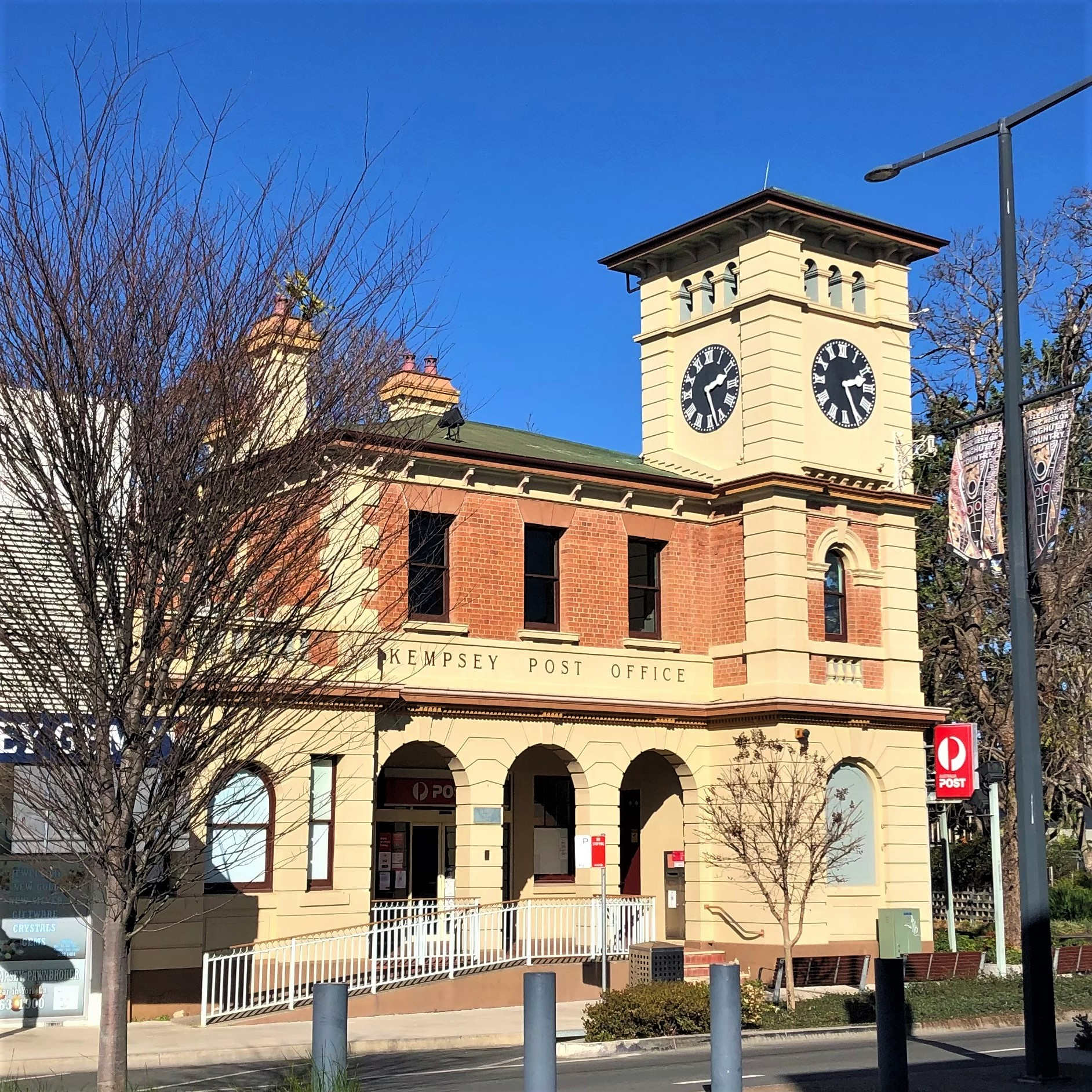
Kempsey Post Office, Smith Street, July 2021

Europeans first settled in the Kempsey area in the mid-1830s, when limekilns were built along the Macleay River to supply the penal settlement at Port Macquarie. In 1836 Enoch Rudder, a squatter, advertised land for sale on his property, in a town he named Kempsey, where East Kempsey now stands. In the same year the Commissioner for Crown Lands established his regional headquarters on the river bank opposite Rudder's land. These two establishments, along with a growing timber industry and fertile farming land, encouraged the further settlement of the area and growth of the town of Kempsey.

The first Postmaster, Edgar Alderidge was appointed to Kempsey in August 1843, with the first office opening one week later on 1 September. Between 1843 and 1859 the Kempsey office was located in East Kempsey; however, from 1859 the post was delivered to West Kempsey, where the new Postmistress, Miss E. P. Dangar, was building a new store, part of which she proposed to be used as the Post Office. In August 1859 the Post Office was relocated to Dangar's store.

In May 1870 the first telegraph line was connected to Kempsey, with the Telegraph Office being located in West Kempsey, being the only intermediate station on the Armidale to Port Macquarie line. The Telegraph and Post Office operated out of separate buildings, due to both services being conducted by different departments.

In July 1875, Robert Burdett Smith, MP applied for the erection of an official Post Office at West Kempsey, and £1,850 was put on estimates for the purchase of land and erection of the building. At this time there was a post office at Kempsey, West Kempsey and East Kempsey, and it was pointed out that a site for the new West Kempsey office would need to be carefully considered, as there was much more business being conducted at Kempsey than at the other two offices. By 1878, there was enough confusion between the three offices that it had been proposed that both Kempsey and East Kempsey offices should be closed and all mail directed to the new West Kempsey office.

In early 1880 moves were begun to have the Kempsey Post Office and the Telegraph Office amalgamated, which was achieved by July of the same year. By 1882 the combined office had an annual revenue of £750, including post, telegraph, money order and Savings Bank business. The same year, a postal inspector reported that the only Government land available for the erection of a new office was at the wharf reserve, which was a hazardous spot during flood periods. Meanwhile, the premises of Mrs Mary Smith were being rented for use as a Post and Telegraph Office from 1 January 1882, for an annual sum of £40. Mrs Smith's building was in Smith Street, on the river side of the road.

£2,500 was put aside for the erection of a new post office for Kempsey, with a site still to be found. Mrs Smith offered a site in Smith Street, known as Barrie's Corner for £600. The block was adjacent to the wharf reserve, and had a building used as a hotel standing on it, which Mrs Smith offered to remove. The land had a frontage of 50 feet to Smith Street and a depth of two chains, although when surveyed it was revealed that it encroached on the wharf reserve by 28 feet. With this in mind, and the wharf reserve unavailable, tenders for a site were called. However, Mrs Smith's site was eventually purchased for the original cost of £600.

The Colonial Architect's office, under the administration of James Barnet, drew the plans. Tenders were called for the erection of the Post Office building, with the builders Messrs Gabriel and McMorrine being accepted for £2,679. The building was completed and occupied on 23 March 1886. So impressed were the citizens of Kempsey with their new office, that they sent a telegram to the Department of Works congratulating them on it. The two-storey building contained the Post Office, a drawing room, dining room, four bedrooms, a bathroom with force pump and the clock tower.

A ball was erected on the top of the clock tower to announce the arrival of steamers at the town wharf. However, within five months the ball was found to be out of order, and was replaced by a flagstaff. The clock itself was also delayed, being installed in 1892. In 1903, £489 was spent to increase the amount of public space available in the postal section of the Office. It had been noted that, due to the small size of the original office, during mail delivery periods anyone could read the telegrams that were being written. A new room was added to the north side of the building, with a door to the street to allow more public space.

In January 1908 the Kempsey Manual Telephone Exchange opened in the former battery room at the Post Office, while the fodder storeroom in the stable was converted into the battery room.

In 1927 the building was extensively remodelled at a cost of £5,496, with work being undertaken by Mr J. Danton of Sydney. The work included the infill of the original entrance in the northern corner, with the front of the office being converted to an entrance lobby, including private boxes. The telephone exchange was moved to a room of its own, providing extra space within the office for the enlargement of the Postal Department room and public space.

New rooms were constructed to house the battery and power rooms, as well as extra bathrooms, a bicycle shed, and a storeroom at the rear of the office. A new entrance was also opened where the old letter box lobby had been. A new stairway from here lead to the Telegraph and Postal Inspector and Clerk's offices on the upper floor.

From 1927 until 1981 no major alterations were carried out at Kempsey, other than ongoing maintenance. In 1981 Kempsey was rearranged to become a Distributing Post Office, as part Australia Post's decentralising plan. As a DPO, Kempsey was to act as a focal point for the redistribution of local area mail with air and rail connection to Sydney for regular next day delivery. Due to the increase in the number of staff and the volume of mail the DPO caused, the DPO office was relocated to a separate building in October 1983.

During the same month the Post Office building was rearranged, with an increase in the public space available, the remodelling of the Postmaster's office for the Senior Postal Clerk and the relocation of the Postmaster's office to the old telegraph room. New floor coverings were laid and the building repainted.

The DPO was closed in July 1988 and their buildings were used by Kempsey Post Office to overcome the continuing need for extra space.

== Description ==
Kempsey Post Office is symmetrical about a three-storey corner clock tower and is in the Victorian Italianate Style. It is a two-storey English Bond brick building with a cream painted, ashlar pattern rendered ground floor front facade. The side and rear facades are of red face brick, and there is rendered quoining to the original corners of the two-storey section.

The building has a hipped roof of green corrugated steel and the clock tower is capped by a pyramidal corrugated steel roof. The clock tower has four clock faces installed of unusual design, having white lettering and hands on a black face. The two storey section has three rendered and cream painted corbelled brick chimneys with terracotta pots, punctuating the eastern and northern sides of the building and at the centre.

The ground floor of the western facade is classically detailed, with a three-bay arched masonry colonnade, with tan painted keystones to the centre and tan and red painted dentilled entablature above. The colonnade is paved with red clay tiles and has a plaster soffit with moulded cornice. The first floor is face red brick with rendered quoining to corners, a wide rendered band below window sill level and bracketed eaves. This band extends to form a balustraded parapet wall to the single-storey northern addition. The square corner tower has classically detailed arched windows to the first floor level and red painted rendered background to the clock faces of the second level, surmounted by a squat belvedere. There is a recent, intrusive concrete ramp and stairs to the front colonnade.

The southern facade is red face brick with cream painted, rendered string courses at ground floor window sill level and ground floor eaves level. There is a recent, intrusive concrete ramp at the centre of the facade matching the ramp to the western facade, accessing the post boxes located within a recessed, tiled porch.

Kempsey Post Office appears to have been constructed in four main stages. These include the original two-storey section with corner tower, followed by the single-storey infill to the north in c. 1904, the eastern single-storey complementary face brick wing addition of c. 1927-28 and the later, detached, single-storey weatherboard addition along the northern boundary.

The main building has been altered and added to substantially since first constructed, a major change being the addition of the complementary stretcher bond brown brick, single-storey wing to the eastern facade of the original two-storey building along the southern boundary.

Flush against the adjacent building is a long, single-storey addition of weatherboard and asbestos cement sheet, with a corrugated steel skillion roof. This addition comprises staff amenities to the western end and cycle shed and storage to the eastern end. There is a carport at the easternmost end of this addition.

Fenestration of the building is regular. There are arched and squared sash windows to the ground floor, with a fixed multi-pane window over the post boxes to the southern facade. There are tan painted, flat arched lintels over the southern facade windows and rendered voussoirs to the western facade. Doors to the building are non-original; however, there are some earlier doors with decorative fanlights located to the western porch side walls. There are recent automatic sliding glass doors located behind the centre arch to the colonnade.

The ground floor of Kempsey Post Office comprises four main areas, including the carpeted retail area at the western end of the building with the standard Australia Post fitout of display wall panels and laminated counters in a grey colour scheme. The three remaining areas include large sheet vinyl areas for mail sorting, storage and contractors to the rear of the building, offices at the centre and staff amenities within the later weatherboard addition to the north.

The ceilings of the ground floor include plaster, board and batten, and plasterboard, all with moulded cornices. There are several exposed beams and the lighting of the ground floor consists of suspended fluorescent lights. Intrusive air conditioning ducting is suspended from the ceiling.

Architraves to the ground floor openings appear to be original or early. There are sections of original skirting left to original wall fabric showing the effects of general wear and tear and there is a cut dado line in the wall render. Walls are predominantly rendered brick in a pastel pink colour scheme, with plasterboard stud walls enclosing the retail area and office behind. No fireplaces appear to have been retained to the ground floor.

Two original four-panel doors are retained to the current cleaner's room and adjacent store; however, the remaining internal doors are modern and there are fanlights over external doors.

The main stair is not original and has been constructed within the base of the clock tower. It is a complex polished timber stair with squared posts and balusters, having a yellow/beige sheet vinyl floor with black edge strips.

The first floor of the Post Office and former residence currently contains the carpeted Postal Manager's office in the southeastern corner, sheet vinyl storage rooms to the northeastern corner and at the eastern end of the stair hall, and a large, carpeted lunchroom to the west. Later toilets with mosaic tiling are also retained to the north at centre. The first floor currently has an overall pastel green colour scheme.

The ceilings to the first floor comprise board and batten to the lunch room, plasterboard with a coved cornice to the hallways, plaster with a wide, simply moulded cornice to the office and storage room and asbestos cement sheet with a quad-mould cornice strip to the toilet areas. Lighting is suspended fluorescent, except in the toilets where attached globes are used. Air conditioning vents are located in the ceilings and there are some units on the walls. Architraves to the first floor openings appear to be original and have been painted. Skirtings also appear to be original and intact.

There are predominantly single upper and lower pane sash windows to this level with red-brown painted frames and there is one multiple upper, single lower pane window to the eastern wall of the Postal Manager's office. There is a large fixed multi-pane internal window above the partition wall to the western side of the Postal Manager's office. One original four panel internal door is retained to the first floor of the northern wall of the Postal Manager's office, the remainder being modern flush and half glazed doors.

Walls of the first floor are largely rendered and painted original brick fabric with moulded corners. Asbestos or fibre cement sheet partition walls are located to the eastern and southern side of the lunch room, the western wall of the Postal Manager's office and the toilet additions to the north. Picture rails are located on the original wall fabric of the Postal Manager's Office and the adjacent hallway to the west. Fireplaces to the first floor have been bricked in, and surrounds retained to the lunch room, Postal Manager's office and adjacent store to the north.

Signage to Kempsey Post Office comprises dark lettering across the western facade below the first floor window sills on the wide, cream painted rendered band and a standard Australia Post sign on a post located at the corner of the building.

The Post Office is located on a prominent corner at an important intersection in Kempsey. It is adjacent to the Macleay River bridge and is important for its architectural quality and townscape value. It is a dominant feature in the streetscape and is surrounded by twentieth-century, two-storey shopfronts

There is landscaping to both facades of the building, including low, dense vegetation to the front footpath and some large trees, grass and planters to the side. Seating to this side is also provided, as is a low timber rail fence, bins and a twin telephone booth. Display lighting to the clock tower is located on posts to the front and side of the tower and the footpath is made up of concrete pavers.

Kempsey Post Office is generally in good condition; however, some cracking, peeling paint, previous patching and general wear and tear is evident to the interior walls, particularly the ground floor.

There is some archaeological potential for the site considering the numerous additions and alterations that have occurred over time and the openness to the rear of the site. There is potential for recovering evidence of earlier buildings or structures, such as the previous building on the site used as a hotel.

While the original interior fabric has been substantially altered, Kempsey Post Office retains the features which make it culturally significant, including the prominent tower with classical motifs, the pyramidal tower roof, the arcaded loggia, the stucco wall finish and polychromatic brickwork, along with its overall style, scale and location.

=== Modifications and dates ===
Original construction in 1886 comprised the Post Office, a drawing room, dining room, bathroom, four bedrooms and a clock tower. It was occupied on 23 March 1886. The original entry to the Post Office was via the western side base of the tower, to a small public space and counter.

A flagstaff was installed in 1888 to replace the ball erected on the tower to announce the arrival of steamers.

In 1892 the clock was installed to the tower.

Alterations and additions to the Post Office were completed c. 1904, probably including the northern single-storey parapeted addition expanding the public space and creating another entry to the building, one either side of the western facade.

Plans from 1917 indicate the location of several outbuildings, including lavatories, lineman's store and a horse shelter, as well as rearrangement of the western first-floor original rooms and installation of a stair to a former balcony on the southeastern corner of the two-storey section.

During 1927–28, plans indicate alterations and additions were made to the building, including the creation of the front colonnade, relocation of the internal stair and the construction of the single-storey eastern wing along the southern boundary incorporating the telephone exchange, battery and power rooms and female retiring room. This construction saw the removal of the original two-storey terrace to the southern facade.

The weatherboard addition of staff facilities and storage occurred c. 1960s, and a further addition of the cycle shed to the eastern end occurred later. Removal of wall fabric to expand and open up mail sorting, storage and contractor's room also occurred at this time.

Major rearrangements of the retail counter area occurred in 1982–83, along with repairs and maintenance to the building, and during 1985 air conditioning was installed.

The Australia Post retail fitout occurred c. 1990s and probably the installation of the concrete ramps to the western and southern facades.

== Heritage listing ==
Kempsey Post Office is significant at a State level for its historical associations, aesthetic qualities and social meaning.

Kempsey Post Office is associated with the early development of the town, as it is linked with the original postal services established in 1843 in East Kempsey, and in 1859 in West Kempsey. Kempsey Post Office has been the centre of communications for Kempsey for over a century, and reflects the growing population and increasing demands for mail, telegraph and telephone services in the area.

Kempsey Post Office also provides evidence of the changing nature of postal and telecommunications practices in NSW. The brief period when Kempsey Post Office became a Distributing Post Office to the local area in the early 1980s is also of some historical significance.

Kempsey Post Office is aesthetically significant because it is a particularly fine and distinguished example of the Victorian Italianate style, and makes an important aesthetic contribution to the civic precinct in Kempsey. Kempsey Post Office is also associated with the Colonial Architect's Office under James Barnet, a key practitioner of the Victorian Italianate style of architecture.

Kempsey Post Office is also considered to be significant to the Kempsey community's sense of place.

Kempsey Post Office was listed on the New South Wales State Heritage Register on 22 December 2000 having satisfied the following criteria.

The place is important in demonstrating the course, or pattern, of cultural or natural history in New South Wales.

Kempsey Post Office is associated with the early development of the town, as it is linked with the original postal services established in 1843 in East Kempsey, and in 1859 in West Kempsey. The current Kempsey Post Office has been the centre of communications for Kempsey for over a century.

The history of changes and modifications to the earlier post offices and the current post office in Kempsey reflect the growing population and increasing demands for mail, telegraph and telephone services in the area.

Kempsey Post Office also provides evidence of the changing nature of postal and telecommunications practices in NSW. The brief period when Kempsey Post Office became a Distributing Post Office to the local area in the early 1980s is also of some historical significance. Kempsey Post Office was designed by Colonial Architect James Barnet, a key practitioner of the Victorian Italianate style of architecture. The Colonial Architect's Office under Barnet designed and maintained a large number of post offices across NSW between 1865 and 1890.

The place is important in demonstrating aesthetic characteristics and/or a high degree of creative or technical achievement in New South Wales.

Kempsey Post Office is aesthetically significant because it is a particularly fine example of the Victorian Italianate style. It is distinguished by its use of stucco and face brickwork and by its prominent Italianate corner tower, which compares with earlier examples at Kiama (1878), Cootamundra (1880–81) and the Yass Post Office (1884).

The scale, architectural style and location of the building, along with the prominent corner clock tower, also make it a focal point defining the centre of the civic precinct of Kempsey, endowing it with landmark qualities.

The place has strong or special association with a particular community or cultural group in New South Wales for social, cultural or spiritual reasons.

Kempsey Post Office is a prominent civic building and a local landmark, and has been the centre of communications for the town for over a century. It also has a long association with Kempsey's postal services. As such, it is considered to be highly significant to the Kempsey community's sense of place.

The place has potential to yield information that will contribute to an understanding of the cultural or natural history of New South Wales.

The site has some potential to contain archaeological information relating to the previous use of the site as a hotel and the evolution of the building and out-buildings associated with the use by the Post Office.

The place possesses uncommon, rare or endangered aspects of the cultural or natural history of New South Wales.

Kempsey Post Office is a particularly fine and distinguished example of the Victorian Italianate architectural style in NSW.

The place is important in demonstrating the principal characteristics of a class of cultural or natural places/environments in New South Wales.

Kempsey Post Office is part of the group of nineteenth-century post offices in NSW designed by the Colonial Architect's Office under James Barnet.
