= St Andrew's Presbyterian Church and Hall, Kempsey =

St Andrew's Presbyterian Church (former) and former Church Hall
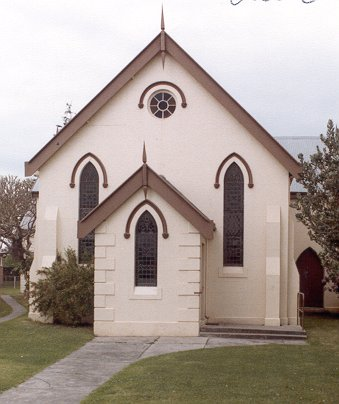
- The former St Andrew's Presbyterian Church
- St Andrew's Presbyterian Church (former) and former Church Hall
- 31°04′42″S 152°50′34″E
- Location: 67 Smith Street, Kempsey, Kempsey Shire, New South Wales
- Country: Australia
- Previous denomination: Presbyterian

History
- Status: Church (former)
- Dedication: Saint Andrew

Architecture
- Functional status: Inactive; sold to private ownership
- Architectural type: Church (former)
- Style: Gothic Revival
- Completed: 16 February 1890
- Construction cost: A£600
- Closed: 1984

Specifications
- Materials: Brick; iron roof

New South Wales Heritage Register
- Official name: St Andrew's Presbyterian Church and Hall; St. Andrew's; St. Andrews
- Type: State heritage (built)
- Designated: 2 April 1999
- Reference no.: 384
- Type: Church
- Category: Religion

St Andrew's Presbyterian Church and Hall is a heritage-listed former Presbyterian church and church hall, that is now a retail store, located at 67 Smith Street, Kempsey, Kempsey Shire, New South Wales, Australia. It was built from 1890. It was added to the New South Wales State Heritage Register on 2 April 1999.

== History ==
On 9 October 1861 a Mr W. Smith presented the parcel of land on which the church now stands and a small timber hall which was used as a schoolhouse was erected shortly afterwards on the land.

In September 1883 the Rev J. Miller Ross held a meeting of Presbyterians on the Macleay and he was told that there was room for two more Presbyterian Charges. It was decided to start with one, and the outcome was the ordination and induction of Matthew Bell on Sunday, 30 March 1884, as the first Minister of the Kempsey Charge.

As a result the schoolhouse was converted into a Church in 1884. A church was also built at Fredrickton and preaching stations also included Gladstone, Belgrave and Green Hills.

Bell was transferred to Urana in 1888. The Rev. John Taylor was inducted on 24 June 1888 and at once formed a Session.

On 16 February 1890 a new church opened in Kempsey, costing £600 and a further £150 for furnishings. It was constructed adjacent to the old church.

In 1983 the Heritage Council was advised that it was proposed to demolish the church, old schoolhouse (Church Hall) and manse for the development of a shopping centre. Following a site inspection and report of the Church, the Heritage Council at its meeting of 2 November 1983 recommended that an Interim Heritage Order be placed over the property to allow the excision of a suitable curtilage for the Church.

Following representations by the Presbyterian Church, the local member and the developer it was agreed that a compromise was reached involving retention of the Church and Church Hall and a reduced curtilage, but provided for the demolition of the manse. This compromise left the way open for the Church and Church Hall to be retained and reused.

The congregation vacated the building and moved to a new church in Rudder Street in 1984.

The Interim Conservation Order was gazetted on 16 November 1984. A Permanent Conservation Order was placed over the Church and Church Hall on 19 July 1985. The Church and Church Hall was transferred to the State Heritage Register on 2 April 1999.

The building has been used as a retail store since being vacated by the church, and now opens out on one side to the car park of the 1980s shopping centre, with a supermarket now at the rear of the former church. In 2017, a charity shop operated by The Smith Family opened in the building.

== Description ==
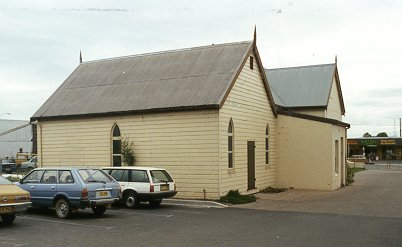
St Andrews's Presbyterian Hall (Old Schoolhouse)

St Andrew's Church is a small stuccoed brick structure with corrugated iron roof built in the Gothic Revival style in 1890.

The interior displays an elaborately carved scissor truss roof lined with timber and several original stained glass windows.

The physical condition of the building was reported as good as at 22 March 2001.

== Heritage listing ==
St Andrew's Church is a small stuccoed brick structure with corrugated iron roof built in the Victorian Gothic style in 1890. The buildings reflect the evolution of the Presbyterian Church in Kempsey. The buildings are aesthetically important to the streetscape.

St Andrew's Presbyterian Church and Hall was listed on the New South Wales State Heritage Register on 2 April 1999.

== See also ==
- Presbyterian Church of Australia
