= Macleay Valley Mustangs Rugby League Club =

Australian rugby league club, based in Kempsey NSW

Macleay Valley Mustangs
Club information
- Full name: Macleay Valley Mustangs Rugby League Club
- Nickname: Macleay Valley
- Short name: Mustangs
- Colours: Royal Blue; White; Yellow
- Founded: 1995

Current details
- Ground: Verge Street Oval, Kempsey
- Coach: Anthony Cowan
- Captain: Anthony Cowan
- Competition: CRL: Group 3 Rugby League Competition

Records
- Premierships: 3 (2012 2014 2019)
- Runners-up: 1 (2017)

Macleay Valley Mustangs Rugby League Football Club is an amateur rugby league club in the Group 3 Rugby League competition, based on the Mid North Coast of New South Wales, Australia. The Mustangs are the main rugby league club based in Kempsey, New South Wales and surrounding areas of Kempsey Shire.

== About ==
The club fields Under 18s, League Tag, Reserve Grade & First Grade sides in the Group 3 competition. The club is a supportive system for young rugby league players in Kempsey Shire area to further their rugby league careers as adults, and acts as a pathway to higher level competitions as well as a local team for those aspiring to play at just a community level.

=== 2012 ===
Macleay Valley Mustangs won the 2012 Group 2 Premiership over Nambucca Heads Roosters in the Grand Final 36–12.

=== 2013 ===
Macleay Valley Rugby League Club was expelled from the remainder of the 2013 Group 2 competition. An "independent panel" convened by Country Rugby League made the decision after considering a motion that the Mustangs had brought rugby league into disrepute. This came after events at Geoff King Motors Oval in 2013 where a match involving Coffs Harbour Comets was abandoned following a wild melee in the 61st minute. Group 2's chief administrator Jim Anderson said Macleay Valley's lower grades sides would not take part in the semi-finals series of 2013 due to the incidents.

=== 2014 ===
The Macleay Valley club was again excluded, this time from Group 3 ahead of the 2015 season. They were found guilty of breaching the group's code of conduct and the National Rugby League code of conduct during the season. This was despite having beaten Wauchope in the Grand Final 25–24.

=== 2019 ===
Macleay Valley won its third premiership in seven years, defeating Wauchope again in the Grand Final.

== Titles ==
Season	Grand Final Information			Competition
Season	Premiers	Score	Runners-up	Competition
2012	Macleay Valley Mustangs	36–12	Nambucca Heads Roosters	Group 2
2014	Macleay Valley Mustangs	25–24	Wauchope Blues	Group 3
2019	Macleay Valley Mustangs	34–24	Wauchope Blues	Group 3

== Notable players ==
- Wayne Bartrim – Gold Coast Seagulls, St. George Dragons, St. George Illawarra & Castleford Tigers
- Sam Howe – Gold Coast Titans NRL Under-20s
- Malcom Webster Jr. – South Sydney Rabbitohs Toyota Cup player
- Anthony Cowan
