= Yass Post Office =

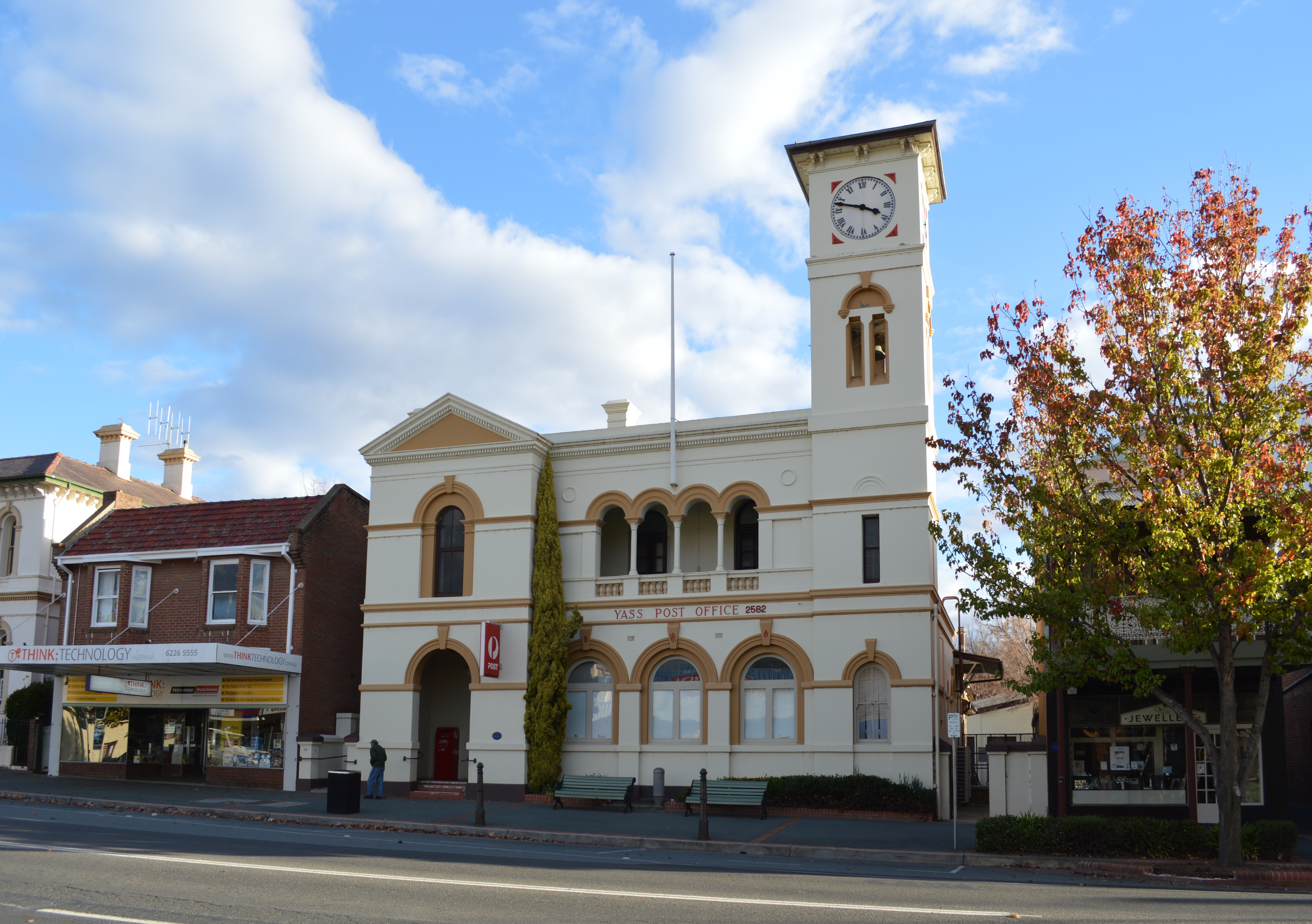

- Location within New South Wales Location within Australia
- 34.8419°S 148.9106°E
- Location: 101 Comur Street, Yass, Yass Valley Shire, New South Wales, Australia

Site notes
- Architect: Colonial Architect’s Office under James Barnet
- Owner: Australia Post

New South Wales Heritage Register
- Official name: Yass Post Office; Post Office
- Type: state heritage (built)
- Designated: 22 December 2000
- Reference no.: 1422
- Type: Post office
- Category: Postal and telecommunications
- Builders: W. Bundock

Yass Post Office is a heritage-listed post office and residence at 101 Comur Street, Yass in the Southern Tablelands region of New South Wales, Australia. It was designed by the Colonial Architect's Office under James Barnet and built by W. Bundock. The property is owned by Australia Post. It was added to the New South Wales State Heritage Register on 22 December 2000.

== History ==
=== Background ===
The first official postal service in Australia was established in April 1809, when the Sydney merchant Isaac Nichols was appointed as the first postmaster in the colony of New South Wales. Prior to this, mail had been distributed directly by the captain of the ship on which the mail arrived; however this system was neither reliable nor secure.

In 1825 the colonial administration was empowered to establish a Postmaster General's Department, which had previously been administered from Great Britain.

In 1828 the first post offices outside of Sydney were established, with offices in Bathurst, Campbelltown, Parramatta, Liverpool, Newcastle, Penrith and Windsor. By 1839 there were forty post offices in the colony, with more opened as settlement spread. During the 1860s, the advance of postal services was further increased as the railway network began to be established throughout NSW. In 1863, the postmaster general, William Harvie Christie noted that accommodation facilities for postmasters in some post offices was quite limited, and stated that it was a matter of importance that "post masters should reside and sleep under the same roof as the office".

The first telegraph line was opened in Victoria in March 1854 and in New South Wales in 1858. The New South Wales colonial government constructed two lines from the Sydney General Post Office, one to the South Head Signal Station, the other to Liverpool. Development was slow in New South Wales compared to the other states, with the Government concentrating on the development of country offices before suburban ones. As the line spread, however, telegraph offices were built to accommodate the operators. Unlike the post office, the telegraph office needed specialised equipment and could not be easily accommodated in a local store or private residence. Post and telegraph offices operated separately until 1870 when the departments were amalgamated, after which time new offices were built to include both postal and telegraph services. In 1881 the first telephone exchange was opened in Sydney, three years after the first tests in Adelaide. As with the telegraph, the telephone system soon began to extend into country areas, with telephone exchanges appearing in country New South Wales from the late 1880s onwards. Again the post office was responsible for the public telephone exchange, further emphasising its place in the community as a provider of communications services.

The appointment of James Barnet as acting colonial architect in 1862 coincided with a considerable increase in funding to the public works program. Between 1865 and 1890 the Colonial Architects Office was responsible for the building and maintenance of 169 post offices and telegraph offices in New South Wales. The post offices constructed during this period featured in a variety of architectural styles, as Barnet argued that the local parliamentary representatives always preferred "different patterns".

The construction of new post offices continued throughout the Depression years under the leadership of Walter Liberty Vernon, who held office from 1890 to 1911. While twenty-seven post offices were built between 1892 and 1895, funding to the Government Architect's Office was cut from 1893 to 1895, causing Vernon to postpone a number of projects.

Following Federation in 1901, the Commonwealth Government took over responsibility for post, telegraph and telephone offices, with the Department of Home Affairs Works Division being made responsible for post office construction. In 1916 construction was transferred to the Department of Works and Railways, with the Department of the Interior responsible during World War II.

On 22 December 1975, the Postmaster General's Department was abolished and replaced by the Post and Telecommunications Department. This was the creation of Telecom and Australia Post. In 1989, the Australian Postal Corporation Act established Australia Post as a self-funding entity, heralding a new direction in property management, including a move away from the larger more traditional buildings towards smaller shop front style post offices.

For much of its history, the post office has been responsible for a wide variety of community services including mail distribution, an agency for the Commonwealth Savings Bank, electoral enrolments, and the provision of telegraph and telephone services. The town post office has served as a focal point for the community, most often built in a prominent position in the centre of town close to other public buildings, creating a nucleus of civic buildings and community pride.

=== Yass Post Office ===
On 29 January 1835 W. H. Dutton, on behalf of the residents of Yass, requested the establishment of a post office by the postmaster general and colonial secretary. On 2 March, the colonial secretary recommended that an office be established with a Mr E. I. Abrahams as deputy postmaster for Yass and twenty shillings per week allowance for the conveyance of mail. The first office was then opened on 1 April 1835 with Mr Abrahams as postmaster. Abrahams resigned from the position in December as he was planning to return to England, prompting W. H. Dutton to recommend Mr J. W. Croaker as his replacement, the appointment being confirmed in March 1836.

From 1837 the overland mail to Melbourne travelled through Yass once per fortnight. The overland mail was run in a relay style, with the horses being changed at regular intervals along the way to allow for the most efficient trip. The mail was originally delivered once per week, with the service increasing to three times per week during 1848 and to six times per week from 1859. However, the coach trip was still a laborious and sometimes dangerous journey, with accidents not uncommon and robbery by bushrangers reported on the Yass coach right through until the 1860s. In 1864 a report to the postmaster-general claimed that £12,000 had been recovered in cheques and bills from robberies on the mail coach, with an unknown figure lost.

While the Yass Post Office operated out of a rented premise in a mixed business, the new telegraph office had a purpose-designed station when it opened in August 1858. Prior to 1867, the electric telegraph was administered by the Public Works Department and as such had their own offices constructed for them. The telegraph was seen as requiring purpose-built stations to house their specialised equipment, and it was not until after 1870 when the postmaster general was administering the telegraph that offices began to be amalgamated.

The introduction of the telegraph system in New South Wales had a profound effect on the operations of the post office. The telegraph operators were employed as full-time civil servants, something that the postal workers were not. Between 1828 and 1862 all postmasters and postmistresses, other than the postmaster in Sydney, were part-time and many ran a second business to support themselves. This resulted in many complaints during this period that the postmaster mistresses had an unfair commercial advantage through access to confidential information. In his report of 1861, the Postal Inspector Levinge recommended two improvements to the postal system. The first was the introduction of money orders to post offices and, in line with this, that official post office buildings should be erected and that permanent postal staff should be employed with no interest in any other business. These recommendations were implemented from the following year.

Yass's first official postmaster was George Robinson, who was appointed on 1 September 1862 on a salary of £200 per annum. Robinson was succeeded as postmaster in February 1864 by Thomas Levinge, the former postal inspector, who in turn was replaced by Richard Crackanthorp later in the same month. Levinge had been unhappy about his transfer to Yass and resigned from the service shortly after his arrival.

In 1871 Postmaster Goold wrote to the GPO requesting that a new post office building be rented in Yass. The office had been operating from a weatherboard building, and Goold suggested they move to a brick building in the same street for £30 per annum, close by the main business houses. His proposal was approved and the move took place on 1 November 1871. From September 1871, New South Wales post offices also began operating as agencies for the Government Savings Bank, which opened a branch in Yass on 11 September 1872. Also in 1872, the first iron letter receiving box was installed in Yass.

In February 1874, the then postmaster William Johnson reported that a new premises was again needed and suggested a former general store for £100 per annum. During the same period the search for a site to erect an official post office had begun. On 30 May, the Lands Department advised that Allotment 8 of Section 1 in the town had been reserved as an official site for a Government Post and Telegraph building. Despite this, in August a report from Postal Inspector Moyse stated that a new post office was not yet required. Moyse put forward two main reasons for his decision: firstly that the current office was sufficient in size for the service; and secondly, that the coming of the railway, with the station some four miles from town, would see a large section of the Postal Service removed to the railway station. Moyse recommended that the Department wait and see what the effect of the railway would be before proceeding with the new office. Moyse had also inspected the site proposed for the new office, commenting on its unsuitability due to it being prone to flooding.

In November 1877, Michael Fitzpatrick MP wrote to the postmaster general requesting a new post office offering suitable accommodation, noting that the present building was unsightly and did not afford adequate accommodation for the postmaster. Furthermore, the new railway had not caused a decrease in the [ostal business and so arrangements were made in May 1878 to invite tenders for a new Post and Telegraph Office. Following this notice a public meeting was held on 16 July, which called for a deputation to the PMG asking for the speedy erection of a post office. The site recommended was Allotment 10 of Section 17 in Comur Street, which was the nearest position available to the other public buildings in Yass. The Comur Street site was owned by the Catholic Church and negotiations for the land began with Father O'Keefe who was acting as trustee for the Bishop. Following negotiations, the lot was purchased for £8 per foot, with a frontage of 66 feet and depth of 132 feet. The sale was completed in October 1878.

With the land secured £1500 was put on the estimates for the construction of the new building. By April 1881, however, the funds had lapsed, while plans had been provided for a building that would cost £4000. In October 1881, Michael Fitzpatrick claimed that the chosen site was not suitable and that a second plot, also owned by the Catholic Church was better suited. This site was almost ninety yards from the original plot, adjoined land of the Commercial Bank and was in every way better suited for a post office. The Church was prepared to exchange the land for an extra £2 per foot, which was approved in December 1881.

In February 1882 it was reported that a new building had been approved and plans drawn with provision made for an office, a sitting room, private office, four bedrooms, a kitchen, pantry and storeroom. The design was rejected by the residents of Yass as being inadequate for the business being done in both the post and the telegraph offices, the residents also being against the amalgamation of the two offices. Despite public protest the Department proceeded with the proposal, accepting the tender of Mr W. Bundock on 24 March 1882 for the erection of a Post and Telegraph Office for the cost of £2,758.3.6, to be completed in twelve months.

Twelve months later, in March 1883, it was reported that the contractor had fallen behind schedule and was asked to hasten towards completion. During this period the office had also relocated to another rented premises in Yass, with a three-year lease at £90 per year. In March 1884 the Yass Courier reported that the post office was still some months from completion, slowed down by the original contractor abandoning the project and the alteration of the original plans. The Courier also noted that without the provision of a battery room the office would be useless as a telegraph office, as it was one of the principle repeating stations of the south districts. In July 1884, the Courier again reported that the post office was not yet completed despite having been under construction for two and a half years, with new tenders required to build the outbuildings due to the original money having been spent.

The post and telegraph office was finally completed and ready for occupation in October 1884. However, in February 1887, the postmaster advised that the additions which had been approved two years previous had yet to be finalised. These included the battery room, stables and wash shed. A second stable and store were also proposed but deemed unnecessary.

A clock turret was erected in October 1888, with the clock being installed by Mr A. Tornaghi, a well known Sydney clock maker. The clock was converted from a manual mechanism to an electrically driven one in June 1980.

== Description ==
Yass Post Office is a prominent civic building located within the heart of the central business district of Yass. It is a two-storey, rendered brick, asymmetrical, Victorian Italianate building with a dominant three and a half-storey corner clocktower. It has a slate gable and hipped roof on the two-storey section and corrugated iron half-hipped and hipped roof over the single-storey section. Five chimneys with moulded tops punctuate the two-storey section and there is a single moulded chimney with a later extended chimney over the residence lounge room.

The clocktower is accessed via an external steel ladder on the northern facade and across the roof to a door on the second-floor level. It has a combination of concrete and boarded floors, with painted brick internal walls and an electric motor for the clock, which retains the original mechanism in-situ. The bell chimes on the hour.

Additions to the building appear to have occurred in several stages. They include single-storey brick buildings to the rear of the site with skillion corrugated iron roofing, and a recent pyramidal roofed carport over the rear loading dock.

The ground-floor entry porch and steps at the southern end of the eastern facade has a recent red tiled floor, with grey tiling in the post office box area beyond and a concrete ramp to the left side of the entry. There is a tubular steel rail at the entry board and batten ceiling and large pendant lighting. The first-floor four-bay arcade is accessed off the bedrooms of the upper floor residence. It has Egyptian-styled columns with classically moulded round arches, balustrade infills of each bay, vinyl tile covered floor, beaded board soffit and attached lights.

The front facade is made of rendered brick and painted while the rear is face brick in a predominantly cream colour scheme with tan detailing, red lettering and red corner details around the clock faces. It has moulded string courses at regular intervals up the facade, with a wider band at the first-floor level and a finely dentilled cornice at parapet level and within the large pediment at the southern end of the eastern facade parapet. Openings are evenly spaced and have moulded arches with prominent keystones.

The tower retains paired lancet windows with label moulds over each pair and there are four clock faces to the tower below the corrugated iron pyramidal roof with bracketed eaves. Each face has black writing on a white background.

The ground-floor interior of Yass Post Office comprises five main areas. These include the separate carpeted residential area, carpeted retail area, offices, mail room and post office box areas and vinyl-floored and tiled staff amenities.

The post office ceilings are varied. The ceilings of the ground-floor residence are predominantly board and batten with an ovolo cornice fluorescent tube lighting and a beaded board ceiling in the entry at the base of the stair. The retail area has a board and batten ceiling with exposed beams, braced corners and plain moulded cornice, as do the mail room, kitchens and toilets, but without braced corners. There is a lower section of suspended ceiling with ducted air conditioning behind the counter, in the office and post boxes area. Fluorescent lighting dominates, being both attached and suspended.

Architraves of the ground-floor residence appear to be original or early, as do the skirtings. Original skirting to the post office section is limited to remnants, however, architraves in the mail room in particular are generally original, with later fabric in the retail area excepting the early front infill windows.

The ground-floor residence retains four panelled internal doors, with a boarded exterior kitchen door. It has a combination of two pane upper and lower sash and multi-pane upper and lower sash windows. The post office section has modern flush and sliding doors, modern front doors, with some four panel doors retained in the mail room accessing the small store room and adjacent toilets.

Walls of the ground-floor are painted rendered brick in a cream colour scheme in the residence, grey in the retail area and beige and tan scheme in the mail room. There are plasterboard partition walls defining the office and storage areas adjacent to the retail area. No fireplaces have been retained at this level, and gas appliances have been installed.

The main stair is constructed of polished, turned timber posts and white painted, turned balusters. It is fully carpeted and has an early skirting. There is a cupboard at the top of the stair and beneath it and the top post of the upper flight appears to have been modified or replaced.

The first-floor of Yass Post Office comprises two areas: the carpeted bedrooms and a tiled bathroom and toilet. The ceilings of the first-floor residence are varied. They include recent acoustic tiles to the eastern side bedrooms with an ovolo cornice, beaded board ceilings in the hall and board and batten ceilings in the southern centre bedroom, toilet and bathroom. There are pendant lights on this level and no air conditioning.

The first-floor architraves appear to be original or early, as does the skirting. There is a plain, non-original picture rail in the south-eastern and centre southern bedrooms.

Windows on this level are predominantly two pane upper and lower sash windows and single upper and lower pane narrow sash windows. Internal doors are four panelled, and original French doors are located to the arcade, with fanlights over each exterior door.

The first-floor walls comprise rendered brick, with some early partition walls enclosing the southern centre and centre eastern bedrooms. Faint ashlar render is visible along the northern wall of the centre hall towards the eastern end, indicating a probable former exterior wall. Fireplaces have been retained to the first-floor, with marble surrounds and cast-iron grates, although the south-eastern corner bedroom fireplace has been boarded over.

Signage to Yass Post Office comprises red lettering centred over the ground floor arched windows "Yass Post Office 2582" and a large attached standard Australia Post sign to the right side of the main entry. Smaller information signs are also attached to the front facade near the entry and to the base of the tower.

Yass Post Office is located within the central business district of Yass, comprising predominantly two-storey nineteenth and twentieth century shopfronts, with a school to the rear across the rear laneway. There are mature trees, shrubbery and grass to the rear of the residence as well as a bitumen and concreted rear yard to the post office. To the front of the building, an early cast iron hitching post has been retained.

Outbuildings are to the rear of the site. They include a recent rendered brick garage on the south-western boundary of the residence yard, an attached brick laundry to the immediate south-west of the residence, a recent steel carport over the rear loading dock, an early brick building containing storage shed, a contractor's room and a cycle shed to the western corner.

=== Condition ===
As at 20 November 2001, Yass Post Office was in generally good condition excepting general wear and tear. Some peeling ceiling paint and minor cracking was also noted. Archaeological potential for the site is considered high.

The original interior fabric of Yass Post Office has been changed and partially removed, particularly during the last thirty years as retail demands increased. However, Yass Post Office still retains the features which make it culturally significant, including the prominent tower with classical motifs, the pyramidal tower roof, the arched arcade, the stucco wall finish and classical detailing, along with its overall style, scale and location.

=== Modifications and dates ===
Opened in 1884, Yass Post Office was a two-storey building comprising an office, sitting room, private office, four bedrooms, kitchen, pantry and store room.

The clock turret, clock faces and mechanism were installed in October 1888.

It appears that the southern end of the building beneath the pediment was an early addition, incorporating what was later to become the telephone exchange, although the date of construction is unknown. Some time after this addition was made, the clock faces were changed from white writing on a black background, to black writing on a white background, however the date of this change is also unknown.

The ground floor arcade was infilled to expand the interior office space, date of construction being unknown, and a new arched entry was created below the pediment.

Some time after 1927, a detached brick laundry was added to the west of the ground-floor residence and the kitchen expanded with the removal of the early laundry shown in 1927 plans.

The date of the removal of the southern single-storey passageway addition to the residence, now an open walkway, is unknown.

A face brick single-storey rear addition currently housing the lunch room was constructed to the north western corner of the building, possibly c. 1950s.

The clock mechanism was converted to an electrically driven motor in June 1980.

In c. 1980 there was a renovation of the front retail area of the building, including the installation of post boxes at the base of the tower with new entries, covered verandah and steps.

In c. 1996 there was a standard Australia Post fitout of the retail area, including display wall panelling and laminated counters, as well as the construction of the garage to the rear of the residence. During this phase of renovation, it appears that the c. 1980 verandah to the northern side was removed, the windows at the base of the tower restored and post boxes relocated and expanded to the southern side beyond the current entry porch. The expansion of the post office box area saw the demolition of an office and store rooms which were constructed in the former telephone exchange.

=== Further information ===
The suspended ceilings of the interior are intrusive. Archaeological potential for the site is considered high, especially considering the open rear of the site in terms of the potential for evidence of early buildings or land use.

Yass Post Office is in generally good condition excepting general wear and tear. Some peeling ceiling paint and minor cracking was also noted.

== Heritage listing ==
As at 27 May 2004, Yass Post Office is significant at a State level for its historical associations, aesthetic qualities and social meaning. Yass Post Office is linked with the original post office established in 1835, and as such is associated with the early development of the town. The scale and style of the building reflects the prosperity of the town resulting from the wool industry in the late nineteenth century. Yass Post Office has been the centre of communications for Yass and the surrounding district for over a century, and reflects the growing population and increasing demands for mail, telegraph and telephone services in the area. Yass Post Office provides evidence of the changing nature of postal and telecommunications practices in New South Wales. The difficulties experienced in the construction of the current Yass Post Office also provides an insight into the community of the town in the late nineteenth century. The surviving hitching post at the front of the building is also an important historical element. Yass Post Office is aesthetically significant because it is a particularly fine and distinguished example of the Victorian Italianate style, and makes an important aesthetic contribution to the civic precinct in Yass. Yass Post Office is also associated with the Colonial Architect's Office under James Barnet, a key practitioner of the Victorian Italianate style of architecture. Yass Post Office is also considered to be significant to the Yass community's sense of place.

Yass Post Office was listed on the New South Wales State Heritage Register on 22 December 2000 having satisfied the following criteria.

The place is important in demonstrating the course, or pattern, of cultural or natural history in New South Wales.

Yass Post Office is linked with the original post office established in 1835, and as such is associated with the early development of the town. The scale and style of the building reflects the prosperity of the town resulting from the wool industry in the late nineteenth century. Yass was part of the mail network to Melbourne in the mid-nineteenth century, forming part of an important communications service in south eastern Australia. Yass Post Office has been the centre of communications for Yass and the surrounding district for over a century, and reflects the growing population and increasing demands for mail, telegraph and telephone services in the area. The history of the various post offices and the changes and modifications to the current post office in Yass reflect the growing population and increasing demands for mail, telegraph and telephone services in the area. Yass Post Office provides evidence of the changing nature of postal and telecommunications practices in New South Wales. The difficulties experienced in the construction of the current Yass Post Office provides an insight into the community of the town in the late nineteenth century. One of the hitching posts survives at the front of Yass Post Office, and is considered to be an important element in understanding the history of the place. Yass Post Office was designed by Colonial Architect James Barnet, a key practitioner of the Victorian Italianate style of architecture.

The place is important in demonstrating aesthetic characteristics and/or a high degree of creative or technical achievement in New South Wales.

Yass Post Office is aesthetically significant as a particularly fine example of the Victorian Italianate style. The use of the round arched arcade compares with Forbes (1881) and Hay (1882), while the tower roof form is similar to Cootamundra (1880–81), Kiama (1878) and Kempsey (1886). The scale, architectural style and location of the building, along with the prominent corner clock tower, also make it a focal point defining the centre of the civic precinct of Yass, endowing it with landmark qualities. Yass Post Office is part of a late nineteenth century group which also includes the adjacent Bank, residence and stables and other civic buildings.

The place has a strong or special association with a particular community or cultural group in New South Wales for social, cultural or spiritual reasons.

As a local landmark the centre of communications for the town for over a century, Yass Post Office is considered to be highly significant to the Yass community's sense of place.

The place has potential to yield information that will contribute to an understanding of the cultural or natural history of New South Wales.

The site has some potential to contain archaeological information relating to the previous use of the site as a hotel and the evolution of the building and out-buildings associated with the use by the post office.

The place possesses uncommon, rare or endangered aspects of the cultural or natural history of New South Wales.

Yass Post Office is a particularly fine and distinguished example of the Victorian Italianate architectural style in New South Wales.

The place is important in demonstrating the principal characteristics of a class of cultural or natural places/environments in New South Wales.

Yass Post Office is part of the large group of nineteenth-century post offices in New South Wales designed by the Colonial Architect's Office under James Barnet.

== See also ==
=== Bibliography ===
- Apperly, Irving and Reynolds (1989). A Pictorial Guide to Identifying Australian Architecture.
- Australia Post Historical Officer. Yass Post Office History.
- Bridges and McDonald (1988). James Barnet Colonial Architect.
- National Trust of Australia (NSW) (1975). National Trust Classification Listing Card – Yass Post Office Group.
- Andrew Ward & Associates and Clive Lucas Stapleton & Associates (1989). Australia Post Historic Properties Survey – NSW.
- Godden Mackay Logan Pty Ltd (2000). Australia Post – Assessment of 24 Post Office.
