= Aboriginal Community Benefit Fund =

Defunct funeral insurance fund

The Aboriginal Community Benefit Fund (ACBF), also known as Youpla, was an Australian company offering funeral insurance targeted at Indigenous Australians. The company collapsed in March 2022, leaving 14,500 customers an estimated A$66 million out of pocket in what was described by the Australian Broadcasting Corporation as a "slow-moving disaster" and "one of the most egregious examples of consumer harm in Australia's history".

== History ==
Funerals, known as sorry business, are an expensive social obligation for Indigenous Australians, who often incur additional expenses in the form of long-distance travel, clothing, catering and accommodation for the deceased's family and community.

In 1992, UK-born businessman Ron Pattenden and Armidale-based healthcare workers Dudley Duncan and Richard Widders came up with the idea of an insurance fund that would cover the cost of its members' funerals. The initial fund was 40% owned by Pattenden, while its successor ACBF 2 was 90% owned by him. By 1997, Duncan and Widders had resigned their directorships.

In 1999, the Australian Securities and Investments Commission (ASIC) launched legal action against ACBF, alleging they had been "unconscionable, misleading and deceptive" to Indigenous customers. The case was settled out of court and ACBF was allowed to continue to operate.

ASIC launched a second legal challenge in 2003, alleging violations of federal anti-hawking laws. As a result, Funds 1 and 2 were closed to new members, but ACBF was allowed to launch a new Fund 3 (Aboriginal Community Funeral Plan) as well as a non-Indigenous Community Funeral Plan.

In 2013, an ASIC survey found that ACBF's claims payout ratio of 13.9% was the lowest of all insurers surveyed. In 2017, ACBF was prohibited from deducting its insurance premiums directly from Centrelink welfare payments.

== Collapse ==
In September 2018, ACBF was "slammed" by the interim report of the Royal Commission into Misconduct in the Banking, Superannuation and Financial Services Industry for potentially misleading Indigenous customers. The company used Aboriginal branding to suggest it was Aboriginal-owned, but the company was owned and operated by non-Aboriginal directors and shareholders. Many customers had signed up believing that their contributions would be paid out in full, while they were actually only paying non-refundable insurance premiums.

Two months later, Pattenden sold ACBF to Rhyn Jones and Isaac Simon. The company was rebranded as Youpla and hired Simon's brother, retired NRL star Jamal Idris, as its spokesperson. However, ACBF continued to send money to its underwriter, Vanuatu-based Crown Insurance Services, which is owned by Pattenden. The Guardian alleged that Pattenden employed a complex web of offshore companies to make over $20m in tax-free profit from ACBF's customers.

After the commission's report, in April 2020 Youpla was prohibited from taking on new customers until it obtained a financial services license, but its two applications to obtain one were unsuccessful. Fund 2 went into administration in November 2021 and all four funds followed by March 2022. Liquidators SV Partners found that while Fund 1 still had $12 million in funds, the others had few or negative assets.

In February 2024, the Australian federal government announced a $97 million scheme to compensate ACBF/Youpla customers with up to 60% of premiums paid.
