= Paul Davis (rugby league) =

Australian rugby league footballer

Personal information
- Born: 12 March 1971 (age 55) Thursday Island, Queensland, Australia

Playing information
- Position: Centre, Five-eighth, Lock
Club
Years	Team	Pld	T	G	FG	P
1992–93	Balmain Tigers	40	10	11	0	62
Representative
Years	Team	Pld	T	G	FG	P
1992	Australian Aboriginies
- Relatives: Nakia Davis-Welsh (daughter); Greg Inglis (nephew)

Paul Davis (born 12 March 1971) is an Australian former rugby league footballer who played professionally for the Balmain Tigers.

== Playing career ==
Davis played forty matches for the Balmain Tigers between 1992 and 1993.

In 1992, he represented the Australian Aboriginies side at the Pacific Cup.

Davis also played Group 2 Rugby League for Port Macquarie, Macksville and Dunghutti.

== Later years ==
Davis coached Dunghutti in 2008.

In 2009 his 15-year-old son, Paul Davis-Welsh, was killed in a car crash. Davis-Welsh was a promising junior and had signed with the Gold Coast Titans under 16s. A memorial golf tournament was later set up in his name.

In 2009 Davis was named in the 2000–2009 Group 2 Team of the Decade.
