= Macleay Vocational College =

School in New South Wales, Australia

Coordinates: 31.0961°S 152.8274°E

Macleay Vocational College (MVC), also known as Macleay Valley Workplace Learning Centre Inc., is a secondary school in West Kempsey, New South Wales, Australia. Established in 2001, the Macleay Vocational College (MVC) is part of the Macleay Valley Workplace Learning Centre Inc., a not-for-profit education and training provider. Jann Eason was the developer of the concept and the founding Principal 1999–2012. Mark Morrison was the second Principal 2012–2020. Ryan Martin was the third Principal 2021–2024. The school is for students who have experienced difficulties at previous schools. ABC News described it as an institution for "last chance" individuals.

In 1999, the concept of a Vocational High School in Kempsey NSW, for the most disadvantaged youth in education was envisaged and in the year 2000 the accreditation process was begun. Jann Eason was the founding Principal.

Two schools, Newington College and Queenwood School, regularly assist Macleay Vocational College through cash donations.

== Facilities ==
The school has a creche which served as a library until Principal Mark Morrison orchestrated its conversion circa 2012.
