= Silas Gill =

Methodist preacher

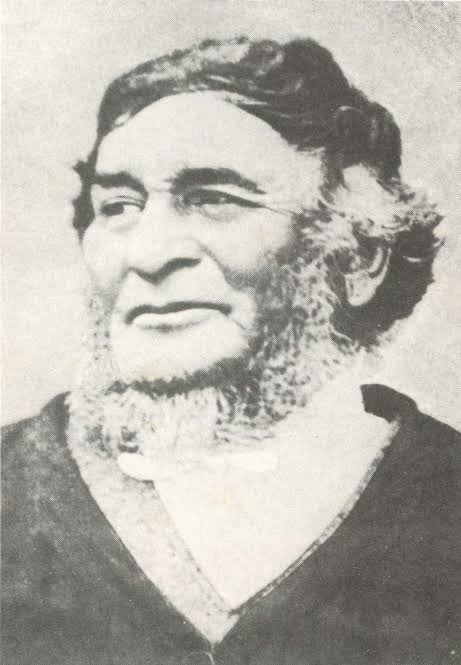
- Silas Gill in 1874
- Born: Silas Edward Herbert Gill; 24 December 1806; East Sussex, England
- Died: 10 September 1875 (aged 68); Kempsey, Australia
- Occupations: Farmer; Church Minister
- Years active: 1859–1875
- Known for: Founding churches in Northern New South Wales.

Silas Edward Herbert Gill was an English-born Australian Methodist preacher.

== Early life ==
Silas Gill was born in East Sussex in England in 1806. His birth date is believed to be 24 December.

Gill married Mercy Catt in June 1826 and moved to Australia in the mid-1830s with four children.

== Career ==
After moving to the Kempsey area in 1859, Gill set up the Methodist Church of Kempsey. He ran it until a Methodist priest came to the area a few years later.

He is also credited with preaching in areas across Northern New South Wales.

He lost all of his possessions in a flood in 1864, but announced he had not lost his faith.

He did all of his religious work for free, and was never paid.

== Death ==
Silas Gill died suddenly on 10 September 1875, aged 68.

== Honours ==
The Gill Bridge over the Kempsey River bears his name.

Gill Street, Kempsey is also named after him.
