= Kempsey Airport =

- IATA: KPS; ICAO: YKMP

Summary
- Airport type: Public
- Operator: Kempsey Shire Council
- Location: Aldavilla, New South Wales, Australia
- Elevation AMSL: 54 ft / 16 m
- Coordinates: 31°04′28″S 152°46′11″E

Map
- Location in New South Wales

Runways
Direction	Length		Surface
Direction	m	ft	Surface
04/22	1,650	5,413	Asphalt

Statistics (2019–20)
- Aircraft movements: 6,542
- Sources: Australian AIP and aerodrome chart movements for the period September 2019 – September 2020

Kempsey Airport (IATA: KPS, ICAO: YKMP) is a small airport located in Aldavilla 4 nautical miles (7.4 km; 4.6 mi) west of Kempsey, New South Wales, Australia. The airport is operated by Kempsey Shire Council and is mainly used for general aviation activities, including flight training, skydiving and emergency services uses. There are currently no scheduled passenger services to Kempsey.

== History ==
The Department of Defence began investigating sites for an aircraft landing ground in the Macleay area in 1929. The aerodrome at Aldavilla formally opened on 4 December 1937, with the occasion marked by a large air show attended by an estimated 2000 people. At the time, it was considered a nationally significant piece of aviation infrastructure as a stopping point and emergency landing option for airliners travelling between Sydney and Brisbane, capable of 24-hour operations, with facilities including a Lorenz beam installation to aid radio navigation.

The local council began lobbying for a civil air service to Kempsey immediately following World War II. Both Butler Air Transport and Australian National Airways expressed interest in establishing routes to Kempsey, however the facilities were now considered unsuitable for larger, modern aircraft such as the Douglas DC-3 and the existing site prone to flooding. This situation saw key en-route navigation equipment relocated to Coffs Harbour Airport. Concerns that planned air services to the Kempsey would be abandoned altogether were addressed by the Department of Civil Aviation in May 1947, announcing a major upgrade to facilities, including a sealed runway.

During the latter half of the 20th century, Kempsey airport saw service by a number of carriers including Airlines of New South Wales, East-West Airlines, as well as Eastern Australia Airlines and its predecessors, who continued to fly to Sydney into the 1990s. Impulse Airlines operated between Kempsey and a number of regional destinations in the state's north-east from 1992 to 2001, when the airline was purchased by Qantas, leaving Kempsey without a scheduled air service.

=== 21st century ===
Horizon Airlines commenced a daily Sydney-Kempsey-Grafton route beginning in July 2003, however the airline would enter voluntary administration in October of the same year, with services ending in 2004.

A secondary grass runway 16/34 was permanently closed by the council following consultation with airport users during 2020. The runway had been regularly unusable as it was prone to flooding after heavy rainfall. In January 2023, the Kempsey Shire Council received a $5 million Federal government grant to resurface and upgrade lighting on the remaining runway.

=== Adventure park controversy ===
A council proposal to construct the Macleay Valley Skydiving Adventure Park on airport lands attracted national media attention in 2021. An $11 million grant from the New South Wales Government earmarked for the project was funded from the state's Bushfire Local Economic Recovery fund aimed at providing relief and stimulating recovery following the devastating 2019–20 Australian bushfire season. The proposal had twice been knocked back for previous grants, but was fast-tracked along with other projects in seats held by Deputy Premier John Barilaro's National Party while other areas waited for assistance with reconstruction of homes and repairs to critical infrastructure. The matter would become the subject of a parliamentary inquiry.

== Airport facilities and operations ==
Kempsey Airport operates with a single, sealed runway 04/22, 1,643 m (5,390 ft) long by 30 m (98 ft) wide. This code 2C runway is equipped with pilot-operated lighting for night operations and is suitable for aircraft up to De Havilland Dash 8 size. There is typically a low volume of traffic, the airport is uncontrolled, so pilots are required to communicate via a Common Traffic Advisory Frequency (CTAF) to safely co-ordinate arrivals and departures. A Non-directional beacon (NDB) at the airport was decommissioned in 2018.

The small passenger terminal and apron are located on the northern side of the airport in close proximity to the Kempsey Flying Club and a number of private hangars and aviation businesses based on the airfield. Kempsey Shire Council have branded this precinct as the Kempsey Aviation Business Park. Both Avgas and Jet A fuel are available in the precinct.

== Ground transport ==
The airport and Kempsey Aviation Business Park are served by Transport for NSW bus route 354, which operates Monday to Friday.

== Accidents and incidents ==
- On 25 February 2014, a Mooney M20TN was landing on runway 04 at Kempsey after a private flight from Port Macquarie Airport when it struck a kangaroo, resulting in minor damage. The aircraft's owner filed a civil lawsuit against the airport' operator, Kempsey Shire Council to recover the costs of repairs. In the resulting case, Kempsey Shire Council v Five Star Medical Centre Pty Ltd [2018] NSWCA 308, a judge found the council had acted negligently by not erecting a kangaroo proof fence around the airport, or issuing a specific NOTAM advising of increased wildlife activity. It was noted that the pilot was aware of a general warning published by Airservices Australia that a wildlife hazard exists at the airport. The decision was overturned on appeal, finding the council did not have an obligation to provide further warning of an obvious risk, and that the installation a new fence was not reasonable given the financial resources it would have required. The Australian Broadcasting Corporation reported that the case highlights how the burden of operating small airports handed to local governments from federal entities was leading to the degradation of aviation infrastructure. The costs involved in fighting such lawsuits leave little money available to councils to invest in maintenance and improvements to facilities which may improve safety.

== See also ==
- List of airports in New South Wales
