= Port Macquarie Sharks =

Australian rugby league club, based in Port Macquarie NSW

Club information
- Full name: Port Macquarie Sharks Rugby League Football Club
- Nickname(s): Sharks
- Short name: Port
- Colours: Sky blue White; Black
- Founded: 1940; 85 years ago

Current details
- Ground(s): Port Macquarie Regional Stadium
- Competition: Group 3 Rugby League

The Port Macquarie Sharks are an Australian rugby league football team based in Port Macquarie and was formed in 1940.

== Playing Record ==
Playing record compiled from scores published in the Rugby League Week.

Year	Group	Ladder Position	Points	Final Position	Report
1985	3	5	21		
1986	3	6	14		
1987	3	1	33	Grand Finalist	
1988	3	5	14		
1989	3	2	32	Grand Finalist	
1990	3	2	32	Premiers	
1991	3	1	22	Premiers	
1992	3	Played Finals		Premiers	
1993	3	Played Finals		Premiers	
1994	3	Played Finals		Finalist	
1995	2	Missed Finals			
1997	2	7	14		
1998	2	5	20	Premiers	
1999	2	1	28	Grand Finalist	
2000	2	1	26	Premiers	
2001	2	1	35	Premiers	
2002	2	1	30	Grand Finalist	
2003	2	1	42	Finalist	
2004	2	1	32	Grand Finalist	
2005	2	5	19	Elimination Semi-Final	
2006	2	1	31	Premiers	
2007	2	2	28	Finalist	
2008	2	4	23	Finalist	
2009	2	3	26	Semi-Finalist	
2010	2	1	33	Premiers	
2011	2	7	14		
2012	2	7	16		
2013	3	4	28	Elimination Semi-Final	
2014	3	4	29	Semi-Finalist	
2015	3	1	40	Premiers	PN
2016	3	1	48	Grand Finalist	NBN
2017	3	3	30	Semi-Finalist	
2018	3	5	28	Premiers	PN
