= Port Macquarie Regional Stadium =

Sports stadium in New South Wales, Australia

Port Macquarie Regional Sports Stadium
- Interactive map of Port Macquarie Regional Sports Stadium
- Full name: Port Macquarie Regional Sports Stadium
- Location: Port Macquarie, New South Wales
- Coordinates: 31°25′38″S 152°52′20″E
- Owner: Port Macquarie-Hastings Council
- Capacity: 10,000 (1,000 seated)
- Surface: Grass
- Field size: 125 m × 85 m (410 ft × 279 ft)

Construction
- Groundbreaking: 1991
- Built: 1992
- Opened: 1992

The Port Macquarie Regional Sports Stadium was constructed in 1992 with funding assistance by NSW Sport & Recreation, NSW Country Rugby League and Hastings Council, making the venue become a primary location of rugby league in the New South Wales' North Coast region. The venue is managed by Port Macquarie Hastings Council.

The venue was upgraded with a 1,000 seat grandstand, transforming the area from a playing field to a genuine high quality sports stadium. Along with the underground irrigation and drainage, the site is available for use on a year-round basis. The stadium has been used for National Rugby League pre-season matches as well holding minor and regional representative fixtures. Elite sporting teams, the Newcastle Knights and the Newcastle Jets have played pre-season friendlies against other teams at the stadium. In 2010 the annual City vs Country Origin match was held at the venue, drawing a crowd of 7,688.

Rugby league is the predominant sport played at the venue, however rugby union and soccer fixtures, at the elite level, have also been played. The principal users of the facility are the Port Macquarie Sharks and the Port City Breakers Rugby League Football Club who both play in the Country Rugby League Group 3 competition.

The Port Macquarie Regional Sports Stadium acts as an alternative venue for the Newcastle Jets and has played host to some A-League Pre-Season Challenge Cup matches, as well as one A-League fixture between the Newcastle Jets and Melbourne Heart FC. The match ended with a victory to the Heart. Since 2006 the Jets have played at Port Macquarie a total of 6 times where they have come away with only 1 point and conceded 7 goals and scored none. Since 2007 one or both teams that have played in a Pre-Season match has gone on to claim the A-League Championship. With Newcastle Jets in 2007/08, Melbourne Victory in 2008/09, Sydney FC in 2009/2010.
