= Matt Donovan (rugby league, born 1970) =

Australian rugby league footballer

Personal information
- Full name: Mathew Donovan
- Born: 20 September 1970 (age 56) Macksville, New South Wales, Australia

Playing information
- Position: Fullback, Wing, Centre, Five-eighth
Club
Years	Team	Pld	T	G	FG	P
1992	Gold Coast Seagulls	10	1	0	0	4
1993	Penrith Panthers	4	0	0	0	0
	Total	14	1	0	0	4

Matt Donovan (born 20 September 1970) is an Australian rugby league footballer who plays for the Coffs Harbour Comets in the Group 2 Rugby League competition. He is nicknamed Mister Magic.

== Playing career ==
A utility back, Donovan first played for the Macksville Sea Eagles in the Group 2 Rugby League competition and was part of the side that won the premiership in 1991.

He then spent time in the New South Wales Rugby League premiership, playing for the Gold Coast Seagulls in 1992 and the Penrith Panthers in 1993.

Donovan then returned to the Group 2 Rugby League competition and became a star. Donovan has played for both the Orara Valley Axemen and the Coffs Harbour club. In 1997, with Orara Valley, he won the Premier League in overtime with five attempts at the Advocate Park. In 2008 with the same club he won another title under the leadership of Darryl Fischer. He later moved to Coffs Harbor Comets, reaching the 2010 final and losing to Port Macquarie.

In 2012, Donovan left the club from Coffs Harbor to join Bellingen Valley / Dorrigo Magpies, although it was rumored that he would retire after leaving Comets. He has repeatedly said that he will end his career in the team from Mackville. Since 2015, he has been an assistant to Gavin Hanna, President of the Woolgulga Seahorses of the Group 2 Rugby League.

Donovan was named in both the 1990s and 2000s Group 2 Rugby League "team of the decade" and is regarded as one of the 'top five' from the centenary of the game in Group 2.
