= Aldavilla, New South Wales =

Aldavilla
- Suburb
- Interactive map of Aldavilla
- Coordinates: 31.0818°S 152.7679°E
- Country: Australia
- State: New South Wales
- City: Kempsey
- LGA: Kempsey Shire

Government
  - State electorate: Oxley
  - Federal division: Cowper

Population
  - Total: 1,443 (SAL 2021)

Aldavilla is a rural locality in the Mid North Coast region of New South Wales, Australia, roughly 10 kilometres west of the town of Kempsey. The locality is bordered on three sides by the Macleay River. Fattorini Creek, a tributary of the Macleay, forms its northern boundary.

Aldavilla has a population of 1,443, close to half of whom are inmates of the Mid North Coast Correctional Centre. The locality is also home to Kempsey's airport, which opened in 1930.

Aldavilla Public School, opened in 1871, is located one kilometre outside of Aldavilla, in the neighbouring locality of Yarravel. The school is notable for using a converted train carriage as one of its classrooms.
