= Troy Robinson =

Australian rugby league footballer

Personal information
- Born: 14 October 1982 (age 42)

Playing information
- Position: Halfback
Club
Years	Team	Pld	T	G	FG	P
2003	South Sydney	2	0	0	0	0

Troy Robinson is an Australian former professional rugby league footballer who played in the 2000s. He played for South Sydney in the NRL competition.

== Playing career ==
Robinson began his playing career with the Wests Tigers and played in the lower grades for the club until he was signed by South Sydney for the 2003 NRL season.

Robinson made his first grade debut for South Sydney in round 18 2003 against Penrith at Penrith Park. The following week, he played at halfback in the club's loss against Parramatta at the Sydney Football Stadium. This would turn out to be Robinson's final game in the top grade.

At the end of the 2003 season, Robinson was released by Souths. He then returned to the New South Wales mid-north coast and played rugby league for Bellingen, Coffs Harbour and Sawtell.
