= Kempsey, New South Wales =

Kempsey
- Town
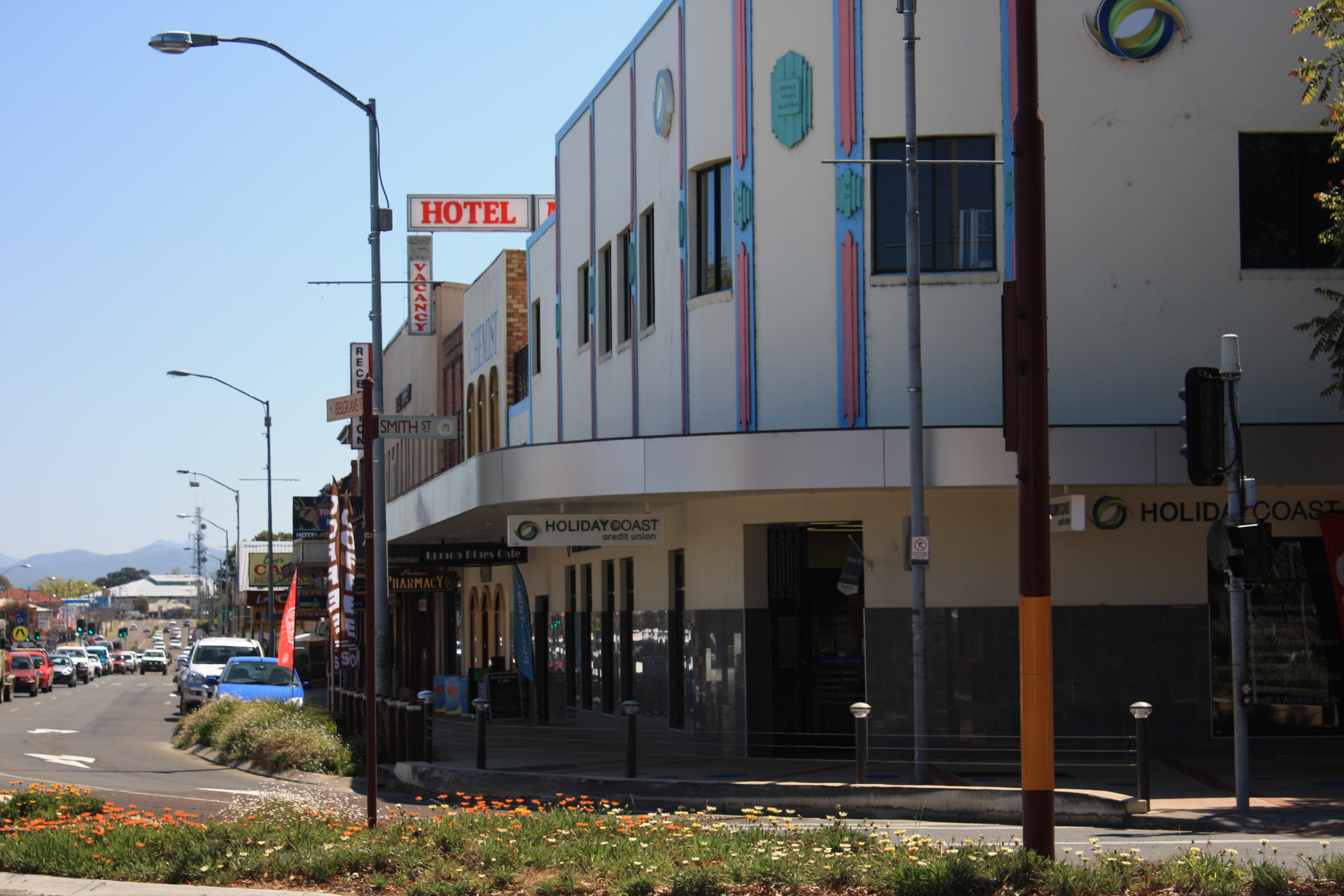
- Kempsey Town Centre

- Coordinates: 31°5′S 152°50′E
- Country: Australia
- State: New South Wales
- Region: Mid North Coast
- LGA: Kempsey Shire
- Location: 430 km (270 mi) NNE of Sydney; 488 km (303 mi) S of Brisbane; 47 km (29 mi) SSW of Macksville; 50 km (31 mi) NNW of Port Macquarie; 18 km (11 mi) NW of Crescent Head
- Established: 1836

Government
  - Mayor: Liz Cambell
  - State electorate: Oxley
  - Federal division: Cowper
- Elevation: 2.3 m (7.5 ft)

Population
  - Total: 11,073 (UCL 2021)
- Time zone: UTC+10 (AEST)
  - Summer (DST): UTC+11 (AEDT)
- Postcode: 2440
- Mean max temp: 25.1 °C (77.2 °F)
- Mean min temp: 11.7 °C (53.1 °F)
- Annual rainfall: 1,220.5 mm (48.05 in)

Kempsey is a town in the Mid North Coast region of New South Wales, Australia and is the council seat for Kempsey Shire. It is located roughly 16.5 kilometres inland from the coast of the Pacific Ocean, on the Macleay Valley Way near where the Pacific Highway and the North Coast railway line cross the Macleay River. It is roughly 430 kilometres north of Sydney. As of June 2018 Kempsey had a population of 15,309.

== History ==
At the start of the British arrival the town lay within the area of the Djangadi people's lands. The Kempsey Local Aboriginal Land Council, established under the Aboriginal Land Rights Act 1983 (NSW), is the statutory representative body for Aboriginal people in the Kempsey area. An Aboriginal presence has been attested archaeologically to go back at least 4,000 years, according to the analysis of the materials excavated at the Clybucca midden, a site which the modern-day descendants of the Djangadi and Gumbaynggirr claim native title rights. In the Clybucca area are ancient camp sites with shell beds in the form of mounds which are up to 2 metres (6 ft 7 in) high. Middens are attested in the Macleay Valley, together with remnants of a fish trap in the Limeburners Creek Nature Reserve and, just slightly north of Crescent Head, at Richardsons Crossing, there is a bora ring.

White presence on the Djangadi lands first took off as mostly ex-convict cedar cutters, based at a camp at Euroka Creek established by Captain A. C. Innes in 1827, began exploring the rich resources of the area in the late 1820s. The first European settler in the Kempsey district was named Enoch William Rudder, in 1835, who had purchased a land grant of 802 acres (325 ha) from its first owner, Samuel Onions.In 1836, runs held by squatters lying outside the sphere of colonial jurisdiction were absorbed into the southern legal framework.

=== European settlement ===
Enoch William Rudder is credited with founding the settlement. He arrived from Birmingham in 1834 and bought land on the southern bank of the river in 1836, at what was then the limit of authorised settlement (the boundary of County Macquarie). He was initially attracted by red cedar cutting opportunities but planned also to profit by selling parts of his land. He had riverside blocks surveyed and established a private town, with the first blocks sold in November 1836. He called it Kempsey because the surrounding areas reminded him of the Kempsey Valley in Worcestershire. The collapse in red cedar prices in the early 1840s nearly led to the failure of the town.

The main (and most flood-prone) part of Kempsey was founded by John Verge, sub-dividing a grant on the flood-plain opposite Rudder's settlement. 1854, a government town was surveyed at West Kempsey and government facilities moved there when it became clear that no town would form around the police station and courthouse at Belgrave Falls. Rudder's settlement was renamed East Kempsey.

Kempsey initially flourished as a centre for logging and sawmilling. Large reserves of Australian red cedar Toona australis, (sold in Britain and the US as "Indian mahogany") were extracted down until the 1920s, and with greater difficulty until the 1960s, by which time the resource was effectively exhausted. Dairying was the major industry in the area until the 1960s, with a Nestlé Milo factory at nearby Smithtown, and several cheese and butter factories.

== Heritage listings ==
Kempsey has a number of heritage-listed sites, including:

- Belgrave Street: Kempsey Post Office
- North Coast railway: Macleay River railway bridge
- 67 Smith Street: St Andrew's Presbyterian Church and Hall

== Climate ==
Kempsey features a humid subtropical climate (Köppen: Cfa) with very warm, humid, rainy summers and mild, drier winters, albeit with cool nights. The town features 116.6 clear days annually with the bulk of clear weather occurring in late winter.

Climate data for Kempsey Airport (31º04'S, 152º46'E, 13 m AMSL) (2001–2024, extremes 1965–2024)
Month	Jan	Feb	Mar	Apr	May	Jun	Jul	Aug	Sep	Oct	Nov	Dec	Year
Record high °C (°F)	43.9 (111.0)	46.7 (116.1)	42.0 (107.6)	36.5 (97.7)	31.0 (87.8)	27.5 (81.5)	28.2 (82.8)	35.8 (96.4)	38.6 (101.5)	40.4 (104.7)	42.6 (108.7)	42.3 (108.1)	46.7 (116.1)
Mean daily maximum °C (°F)	29.5 (85.1)	28.9 (84.0)	27.4 (81.3)	25.3 (77.5)	22.5 (72.5)	20.2 (68.4)	20.1 (68.2)	21.8 (71.2)	24.4 (75.9)	25.7 (78.3)	26.9 (80.4)	28.4 (83.1)	25.1 (77.2)
Mean daily minimum °C (°F)	18.0 (64.4)	18.0 (64.4)	16.7 (62.1)	13.1 (55.6)	8.6 (47.5)	6.6 (43.9)	5.0 (41.0)	5.2 (41.4)	8.1 (46.6)	11.3 (52.3)	14.3 (57.7)	16.2 (61.2)	11.8 (53.2)
Record low °C (°F)	8.3 (46.9)	11.0 (51.8)	6.6 (43.9)	3.0 (37.4)	−4.1 (24.6)	−2.6 (27.3)	−3.6 (25.5)	−4.2 (24.4)	−0.4 (31.3)	1.2 (34.2)	4.5 (40.1)	7.4 (45.3)	−4.2 (24.4)
Average precipitation mm (inches)	117.9 (4.64)	148.8 (5.86)	202.0 (7.95)	68.2 (2.69)	57.5 (2.26)	95.7 (3.77)	37.6 (1.48)	45.1 (1.78)	43.1 (1.70)	84.9 (3.34)	102.7 (4.04)	106.6 (4.20)	1,112.8 (43.81)
Average precipitation days (≥ 1.0 mm)	9.4	10.6	10.8	8.7	5.2	6.0	4.3	3.7	4.7	7.3	8.7	9.4	88.8
Average afternoon relative humidity (%)	58	62	60	59	54	54	48	44	48	53	59	57	55
Average dew point °C (°F)	18.1 (64.6)	18.9 (66.0)	17.0 (62.6)	14.4 (57.9)	10.4 (50.7)	8.6 (47.5)	6.5 (43.7)	6.2 (43.2)	9.8 (49.6)	12.3 (54.1)	15.2 (59.4)	16.4 (61.5)	12.8 (55.1)
Source: Bureau of Meteorology (2001–2024 normals, extremes 1965–2024)

=== Floods ===
Geographically, Kempsey stretches out around a long loop of the Macleay River at the top of the floodplain. It is famous for its floods. The 1949 flood was particularly destructive, having washed away a large part of the town centre when the railway viaduct (which was acting as a dam-wall due to a build-up of debris against the approaches to the railway bridge) gave way. The area most affected by this flood is now the site of playing fields. The shire council has a policy of buying up land in areas designated as flood plains and many houses have been transported to higher ground in recent years. Other major floods occurred in 1949, 1950, 1963, 2001, 2009, 2013, 2021, late February to March 2022

== Economy ==
In 2021, of the 15,564 residents in the area 2,667 worked full-time and 1,996 worked part-time. The area has an unemployment rate significantly higher at 8.6% compared to the national average of 4.9%. The median weekly household income is $1081, compared to the national average of $1746.

Kempsey has a growing local economy based on tourism, farming and service industries. As a local centre it has many shops and services including three major supermarkets and fast food chain stores.

Kempsey is home to the headquarters of Akubra, one of Australia's most iconic hat manufacturers.

In 2014, the Australian Bureau of Statistics ranked Kempsey as one of the poorest Local Government areas in New South Wales.

A Coles supermarket development (known as the "Kempsey Central Shopping Centre") has been built and is situated where the Tattersalls Hotel and various small businesses were in Little Belgrave Street. This shopping centre opened on 6 December 2008. Target Country closed their department store on 9 June 2018 – this ends a 33-year connection to the Macleay Valley (Fosseys was formerly in town before being rebranded as Target Country).

Growing industries include wineries, nut and finger lime production. Kempsey is a service centre for the nearby coastal resorts of South West Rocks, Arakoon, Hat Head, Crescent Head and for the heritage-listed mountain village of Bellbrook, which are popular places for retirees and holiday-makers alike.

== Demographics ==
Historical population
Year	Pop.	±%
1921	3,613	—
1933	4,824	+33.5%
1947	6,330	+31.2%
1954	7,489	+18.3%
1961	8,016	+7.0%
1966	8,198	+2.3%
1971	8,706	+6.2%
1976	8,881	+2.0%
1981	9,037	+1.8%
1986	9,335	+3.3%
1991	9,049	−3.1%
1996	8,630	−4.6%
2001	8,444	−2.2%
2006	8,137	−3.6%
2011	10,374	+27.5%
2016	10,648	+2.6%
2021	11,073	+4.0%
Source: Australian Bureau of Statistics data. Note: after 2006, Kempsey's population includes the population of several additional neighbouring communities.

According to the 2021 census, the median age in the Kempsey area is 42. 12.9% of residents are Aboriginal or Torres Strait Islander. 84.4% of people were born in Australia. compared with the national average of 66.9%. The next most common country of birth was England at 1.6%. 71.9% reported having both parents born in Australia; this is significantly higher than the national average of 45.9%. 84.4% of Kempsey residents spoke only English at home.

The most common responses for religion were No Religion 35.2%, Catholic 19.4%, and Anglican 15.8%.

== Sports ==
The most popular sport in Kempsey is rugby league. The town has produced many NRL stars including Amos Roberts, Aiden Tolman, Albert Kelly, James Roberts and former Australian centre and Indigenous All Stars captain Greg Inglis, the latter 3 of whom are cousins. A local team, the Macleay Valley Mustangs, play in the Group 3 Rugby League competition, with their home ground being Verge St Oval. Another local team, the Lower Macleay Magpies, based in nearby Smithtown, play in the Hastings League. Kempsey have a junior team in the Group 2 Rugby League competition, the Kempsey Dragons.

Kempsey Rugby League teams:

- Macleay Valley Mustangs (Group 3 Rugby League)
- Lower Macleay Magpies (Hastings League)

Kempsey used to have an Australian rules team called the Macleay Valley Eagles, who folded in 2016.

== Crime ==
In recent decades, Kempsey has attracted attention for its high and rising rate of crime when compared with state averages. In 2016 crime figures released by the NSW Police Force revealed crime levels in Kempsey are two times the state average. Break and enter is a particular problem, with a rate three times the state average. From 2014 to 2016, most crimes increased in Kempsey, with domestic violence, robbery with a firearm and break and enters all rising.

In 2015 it was reported in the Sydney Morning Herald that Kempsey was experiencing violent crime linked to ice addiction. Offences for methamphetamine trafficking are roughly twice the state average. There followed a proactive program of crime prevention and community safety initiatives funded through the Australian, NSW and local government that has seen the town revitalised and crime incidents reduced. The 2016–17 Annual Report of Kempsey Shire Council indicated 80% of residents felt safe in their homes and public spaces.

== Facilities ==
Government buildings such as the council chambers, library and several offices – are located west of the North Coast Railway line in West Kempsey. This area is not subject to the flooding that the CBD occasionally sees and is seen as a second business district with a variety of businesses and banking facilities. Opened in July 2004, the Mid North Coast Correctional Centre, a minimum to medium prison for 500 male and female inmates, is located in Aldavilla, approximately 14 kilometres (8.7 mi) west of Kempsey. As of 2019 there are plans to add extra housing for more inmates by 2020.

== Transport ==
Until a new 14.5 kilometre bypass opened on 27 March 2013, the Pacific Highway passed through Kempsey. The former alignment is now known as the Macleay Valley Way. The new bypass included a 3.2 kilometre Macleay River Bridge, the longest bridge in Australia.

Kempsey railway station is located on the North Coast line providing a connection to Sydney and Brisbane.

Kempsey Airport (ICAO: YKMP) is located at Aldavilla approximately 8.5 kilometres west of the town centre, Kempsey Airport is available 24 hours a day for Private Aircraft and Charter Flights as well as being a valuable community asset that is used frequently for Aeromedical Services and Aerial Firefighting.

== Media ==
=== Radio stations ===
Radio stations that broadcast to the town are ABC Mid North Coast, Triple M Mid North Coast, hit Mid North Coast, and Tank FM, a community-based station which broadcast on 103.1 FM and online.

=== Television ===
All major digital-only television channels are available in Kempsey. The networks and the channels they broadcast are listed as follows:

- Seven (formerly Prime7 and Prime Television), 7two, 7mate, 7Bravo, 7flix. Seven Network owned and operated station channels.
- Nine (NBN), 9Go!, 9Gem and 9Life. Nine Network affiliated channels – owned by WIN Corporation.
- 10, 10 Drama, 10 Comedy and Nickelodeon. Network 10 owned and operated station channels.
- ABC, ABC Family, ABC Kids, ABC Entertains and ABC News, part of the Australian Broadcasting Corporation.
- SBS, SBS2, SBS World Movies, SBS WorldWatch, SBS Food and NITV, part of the Special Broadcasting Service.

Of the three main commercial networks:

- The Seven Network airs a half-hour local Seven News bulletin for the North Coast at 6 pm each weeknight. It is broadcast from studios in Canberra with reporters based at a local newsroom in the town.
- WIN Television airs NBN News, a regional half-hour long program including opt-outs for the Mid North Coast, every night at 5:30pm. It is broadcast from studios in Newcastle with reporters based at a local newsroom in the town.
- Network 10 airs short local news updates throughout the day, broadcast from its Hobart studios.

=== Newspapers ===
The town is served by The Macleay Argus which is published twice a week, on Tuesday and Friday.

== Education ==
=== Primary schools ===
- Kempsey East Public School
- Kempsey South Public School
- Kempsey West Public School
- Kempsey Adventist School
- Green Hill Public School
- St Joseph's Primary School

=== High schools ===
- Kempsey High School in West Kempsey largely servicing students living north of the Macleay.
- Melville High School in South Kempsey servicing students living south of the river and in the beachside communities.
- St Paul's College
- Kempsey Adventist School in South Kempsey servicing students all around the Macleay.
- Macleay Vocational College
- Mid North Coast Correctional Centre provides education equivalent to high school level as a means of rehabilitation and reintegration

== Notable people ==
- Richard James Allen, poet, dancer, filmmaker
- Jolene Anderson, actress and It Takes Two Series 2 winner
- Wayne Bartrim, rugby league player of the 1990s
- Joseph Donovan, Olympic boxer
- Slim Dusty (David Gordon Kirkpatrick), singer
- Charles Louis Gabriel, Medical practitioner
- Silas Gill, Methodist preacher
- Terry Giddy, Paralympic athlete
- David Griffin, Paralympic swimmer & gold medallist
- Greg Inglis, rugby league player
- Albert Kelly, rugby league player
- Thomas Keneally, novelist
- Robin Klein, author
- Henry Tasman Lovell, Psychologist and educator
- Amos Morris, singer
- Andy Patmore, rugby league player.
- Penelope Plummer, Miss World 1968
- Dennis Richardson, Officer of the Order of Australia, former Director-General of Security of the Australian Security Intelligence Organisation, and former Australian ambassador to the United States
- Amos Roberts, former rugby league footballer
- James Roberts, rugby league player.
- Joe Robinson, guitarist and winner of Australia's Got Talent, Season 2
- Dave Sands, Indigenous Australian boxer
- Hector Thompson, boxer of the 1970s and 1980s
- Aiden Tolman, rugby league player
- Jack Verge, rugby union player
- Amy Winters, Paralympic gold medallist
- Triston Reilly, rugby league and rugby union player.

== In fiction ==
Tom Keneally's novel A River Town, (1995), a mystery novel centred on the lives of an Irish settler Tim Shea and his family in the period on the eve of Federation, is set in Kempsey.
