= Ron Gill =

Australian rugby league footballer and administrator

Personal information
- Full name: Ronald William Gill
- Born: 16 June 1917 Ulmarra, New South Wales
- Died: 3 September 1965 (aged 48) Newcastle, New South Wales

Playing information
- Position: Wing
Club
Years	Team	Pld	T	G	FG	P
1943	St. George	16	7	0	0	21
Representative
Years	Team	Pld	T	G	FG	P
1943	NSW Country	1	0	0	0	0

Ronald William Gill (16 June 1917 – 3 September 1965) was an Australian rugby league footballer who played in the 1940s.

== Playing career ==
Born at Ulmarra, New South Wales, Gill was one of the finest wingers to ever come from the Clarence River, New South Wales area. He represented Clarence River in 1937 and Newcastle in 1938. After enlisting in the Australian Army in 1942, Gill was stationed to the St. George area and played one season with St. George in 1943 in which he scored 7 tries in 16 games, and he also represented N.S.W. Country Firsts in 1943.

After the war ended. Gill returned to Newcastle football and played with Ulmarra R.L.F.C until the early 1950s.

== Death ==
Gill died in Newcastle, New South Wales on 3 September 1965.
