= Group 3 Rugby League =

Australian rugby league

- Sport: Rugby league
- Formerly known as: Group 18 Rugby League, Manning River Rugby League
- Instituted: 1946 (as Group 18)
- Inaugural season: 1966 (as Group 3)
- Number of teams: 8
- Country: Australia
- Premiers: Wingham District Tigers (2026)
- Most titles: Wingham District Tigers (10 titles)
- Website: Group 3
- Related competition: Hastings League

Group 3 is a rugby league competition on the north coast of New South Wales, run under the auspices of the NSWRL . The Group 3 area runs from Kempsey in the north to Forster in the south.

== History ==
The league began in 1946, with Taree Old Bar winning the first ever premiership. At the time, this league was known as Group 18. In 1966, the boundaries were re-drawn to include three new clubs (Camden Haven, Port Macquarie, and Wauchope) and the group's name was changed to Group 3.

In 1995, Port Macquarie and Wauchope joined Group 2 in another re-zoning, with teams from Group 3 Saturday League joining the competition. In 2003, Port City RLFC joined the competition on loan from Group 2. In 2004, Wauchope re-joined the league after departing at the end of the 1994 season.

The current First Grade premiers are the Old Bar Beach Pirates.

The 2020 Group 3 competition was cancelled due to the COVID-19 pandemic in Australia. Junior competitions were postponed, eventually commencing in July. The highest age group competition winners were Wingham Tigers (Under 18 boys) and Port Macquarie Sharks (Under 17 Ladies League Tag).

== Teams ==
The following clubs field teams in the Group 3 First Grade competition.

| Club | City/Town | Founded | Home Ground | No. of Titles | Premierships |
|---|---|---|---|---|---|
| Forster Tuncurry Hawks | Forster/Tuncurry | 1946 | Harry Elliot Oval | 9 | 1947, 1968, 1970, 1986, 1994, 1995, 1998, 2004, 2011 |
| Macleay Valley Mustangs | Kempsey | 1995 | Verge Street Oval | 2 | 2014, 2019 |
| Old Bar Beach Pirates | Old Bar | 1995 | Old Bar Reserve | 4 | 1996, 1999, 2023 , 2025 |
| Port City Breakers | Port Macquarie | 2002 | Regional Stadium | 5 | 2008, 2010, 2016, 2017, 2022 |
| Port Macquarie Sharks | Port Macquarie | 1940 | Regional Stadium | 8 | 1976, 1990, 1991, 1992, 1993, 2015, 2018 , 2024 |
| Taree City Bulls | Taree | 1998 | Jack Neal Oval | 3 | 2000, 2001, 2007 |
| Wauchope Blues | Wauchope | 1920 | Lank Bain Oval | 8 | 1967, 1969, 1972, 1975, 1984, 2009, 2012, 2013 |
| Wingham Tigers | Wingham | 1900s | Wingham Sporting Complex | 10 | 1950, 1952, 1953, 1961, 1962, 1989, 1997, 2002, 2003, 2026 |

== Former Teams ==
- Camden Haven Eagles (Withdrew from Senior Football)
- Cape Hawke (became Forster-Tuncurry)
- Cundletown (Folded)
- Forster Dragons (Folded)
- Gloucester Magpies (Withdrew from first grade in 2002)
- Halliday Point Makos (Folded 2009)
- Taree Rhinos (Folded)
- Taree Browns Creek (Folded)
- Taree Old Bar (Folded 1994)
- Taree United (Folded 1994)

== Map ==
| Local Area | in New South Wales |
|---|---|
| Locations of the current Group 3 clubs. | Relation to state & national capitals |

== Premierships ==
=== First Grade ===
Separate teams in 1946, Forster and Tuncurry combined as Cape Hawke in 1947, then played as Foster-Tuncurry from 1953.

| Season | Grand Final Information | | | | Minor Premiers |
| Season | Premiers | Score | Runners-up | Report | Minor Premiers |
|---|---|---|---|---|---|
| 1946 | Taree Old Bar | 9–5 | Forster | | Forster |
| 1947 | Cape Hawke | 10–4 | Taree Old Bar | | Cape Hawke |
| 1948 | Taree Browns Creek | 8–7 | Cape Hawke |
| 1949 | Taree Browns Creek | 18–2 | Cape Hawke | | Taree Browns Creek |
| 1950 | Wingham District | 7–3 | Taree Browns Creek | | Wingham District |
| 1951 | Taree Browns Creek | 5–4 | Taree Old Bar | | Taree Browns Creek |
| 1952 | Wingham District | 14–5 | Taree Browns Creek | | Wingham District |
| 1953 | Wingham District | 10–0 | Taree Old Bar | | Wingham District |
| 1954 | Gloucester | 10–2 | Taree Browns Creek | | Gloucester |
| 1955 | Taree Browns Creek | 10–0 | Wingham District |
| 1956 | Taree Browns Creek | 8–2 | Wingham District |
| 1957 | Gloucester | 17–10 | Wingham District |
| 1958 | Gloucester | 7–4 | Taree Old Bar |
| 1959 | Gloucester | 37–0 | Cundletown |
| 1960 | Gloucester | 7–4 | Wingham District |
| 1961 | Wingham District | 9–5 | Taree United |
| 1962 | Wingham District | 15–12 | Gloucester |
| 1963 | Gloucester | 10–7 | Wingham District |
| 1964 | Gloucester | 6–5 | Wingham District |
| 1965 | Gloucester | 15–2 | Taree Old Bar |

=== Group 3 ===
| Season | Grand Final Information | | | | Minor Premiers |
| Season | Premiers | Score | Runners-up | Report | Minor Premiers |
|---|---|---|---|---|---|
| 1966 | Gloucester | 29–2 | Wingham District | | Gloucester |
| 1967 | Wauchope | 10–9 | Forster Tuncurry | | Wauchope |
| 1968 | Forster Tuncurry | 21–0 | Taree United | | Forster Tuncurry |
| 1969 | Wauchope | 14–4 | Forster Tuncurry | | Wauchope |
| 1970 | Forster Tuncurry | 14–4 | Port Macquarie | | Forster Tuncurry |
| 1971 | Taree United | 44–8 | Taree Old Bar | | Taree United |
| 1972 | Wauchope | 24–7 | Wingham District | | Wauchope |
| 1973 | Taree United | 8–3 | Taree Old Bar | | Taree United |
| 1974 | Taree United | 18–15 | Forster Tuncurry | | Forster Tuncurry |
| 1975 | Wauchope | 18–8 | Taree United | | Port Macquarie |
| 1976 | Port Macquarie | 24–10 | Wingham District | | Port Macquarie |
| 1977 | Taree United | 12–9 | Forster Tuncurry | | Taree United |
| 1978 | Taree Old Bar | 24–20 | Taree United | | Wingham District |
| 1979 | Taree Old Bar | 24–10 | Port Macquarie | | Port Macquarie |
| 1980 | Taree Old Bar | 12–6 | Port Macquarie | | Taree Old Bar |
| 1981 | Taree Old Bar | 19–4 | Wingham District | | Taree Old Bar |
| 1982 | Taree Old Bar | 10–7 | Wingham District | | Taree Old Bar |
| 1983 | Taree United | 14–6 | Wauchope | | Wauchope |
| 1984 | Wauchope | 18–12 | Taree Old Bar | | Taree Old Bar |
| 1985 | Taree United | 22–10 | Wauchope | | Wauchope |
| 1986 | Forster Tuncurry | 18–6 | Wingham District | | Forster Tuncurry |
| 1987 | Taree Old Bar | 9–2 | Port Macquarie | | Port Macquarie |
| 1988 | Taree Old Bar | 50–8 | Camden Haven | | Taree Old Bar |
| 1989 | Wingham District | 28–8 | Port Macquarie | | Port Macquarie |
| 1990 | Port Macquarie | 10–2 | Wauchope | | Wauchope |
| 1991 | Port Macquarie | 24–7 | Forster Tuncurry | | Port Macquarie |
| 1992 | Port Macquarie | 20–14 | Wingham District | | Port Macquarie |
| 1993 | Port Macquarie | 30–14 | Wauchope | | Wauchope |
| 1994 | Forster Tuncurry | 20–4 | Wauchope | | Forster Tuncurry |
| 1995 | Forster Tuncurry | 44–6 | South Taree | | Forster Tuncurry |
| 1996 | Old Bar | 24–2 | Wingham District | | Wingham District |
| 1997 | Wingham District | 26–16 | Forster Tuncurry | | Camden Haven |
| 1998 | Forster Tuncurry | 24–14 | Old Bar | | Forster Tuncurry |
| 1999 | Old Bar | 26–6 | Wingham District | | Old Bar |
| 2000 | Taree City | 40–20 | Old Bar | | Old Bar |
| 2001 | Taree City | 52–9 | Forster Dragons | | Taree City |
| 2002 | Wingham District | 30–26 | Taree City | | Taree City |
| 2003 | Wingham District | 30–20 | Forster Tuncurry | | Wingham District |
| 2004 | Forster Tuncurry | 50–6 | Wingham District | | Forster Tuncurry |
| 2005 | Camden Haven | 31–22 | Taree City | | Taree City |
| 2006 | Camden Haven | 26–10 | Wauchope | | Camden Haven |
| 2007 | Taree City | 28–20 | Port City | | Taree City |
| 2008 | Port City | 40–16 | Forster Tuncurry | | Port City |
| 2009 | Wauchope | 32–10 | Port City | | Wauchope |
| 2010 | Port City | 30–6 | Forster Tuncurry | | Port City |
| 2011 | Forster Tuncurry | 30–16 | Port City | | Port City |
| 2012 | Wauchope | 24–20 | Port City | | Wauchope |
| 2013 | Wauchope | 49–18 | Old Bar | | Wauchope |
| 2014 | Macleay Valley | 25–24 | Wauchope | | Wauchope |
| 2015 | Port Macquarie | 20–8 | Port City | | Port Macquarie |
| 2016 | Port City | 26–6 | Port Macquarie | | Port Macquarie |
| 2017 | Port City | 28–20 | Macleay Valley | | Port City |
| 2018 | Port Macquarie | 18–10 | Port City | | Port City |
| 2019 | Macleay Valley | 34–24 | Wauchope | | Macleay Valley |
| 2020 | Cancelled due to the COVID-19 pandemic in Australia |
| 2021 | Cancelled due to the COVID-19 pandemic in Australia |
| 2022 | Port City | 20–12 | Old Bar | | Port City |
| 2023 | Old Bar | 22–10 | Port Macquarie | | Old Bar |
| 2024 | Port Macquarie | 16–10 | Macleay Valley | | Port Macquarie |
| 2025 | Old Bar | 24–10 | Port Macquarie | | Port Macquarie |
| 2026 | Wingham District | 17–16 | Port Macquarie | | Wingham District |

Source: Group 3 History Grand Final scores compiled from results published in the Rugby League Week.

=== Leaderboard ===
Bold indicates active club (Correct as of 28 September 2020)

| Club | Premierships | Runners-up | Minor Premierships |
|---|---|---|---|
| **Wingham District** | 10 | 16 | 3 |
| **Forster Tuncurry** | 9 | 12 | 8 |
| Gloucester | 9 | 1 | ? |
| **Wauchope District** | 8 | 8 | 11 |
| Taree Old Bar | 8 | 8 | 5 |
| **Port Macquarie Sharks** | 8 | 6 | 10 |
| Taree United | 6 | 4 | 3 |
| **Port City** | 5 | 6 | 4 |
| Taree Browns Creek | 5 | 3 | ? |
| **Taree City** | 3 | 3 | 4 |
| **Old Bar Beach** | 3 | 3 | 3 |
| Camden Haven | 2 | 1 | 2 |
| **Macleay Valley Mustangs** | 2 | 1 | 1 |
| Cundletown | 0 | 1 | 0 |
| Forster Dragons | 0 | 1 | 0 |
| South Taree | 0 | 1 | 0 |

== Juniors ==
Junior Clubs

- Camden Haven Eagles (No Seniors)
- Forster Tuncurry Hawks
- Gloucester Magpies (Seniors play in Newcastle & Hunter Rugby League)
- Lake Cathie Raiders (Seniors play in Hastings League)
- Old Bar Beach Pirates
- Port City Breakers
- Port Macquarie Sharks
- Taree Red Rovers (feeder club to Taree City)
- Taree Panthers (feeder club to Taree City)
- Wauchope Blues
- Wingham Tigers

=== Forster Tuncurry Hawks ===
- Danny Buderus

=== Macleay Valley Mustangs ===
- Wayne Bartrim
- Aiden Tolman

=== Old Bar Beach Pirates ===
- Boyd Cordner
- Ben Harris

=== Port City Breakers ===
- Daniel Dumas

=== Port Macquarie Sharks ===
- Scott Dureau

=== Taree City Bulls ===
- Matt Adamson
- Phil Adamson
- Latrell Mitchell

=== Wauchope Blues ===
- Mark Laurie
- Robert Laurie
- Ian Schubert
- Rex Terp

=== Wingham Tigers ===
- Michael Sullivan
- Mitchell Barnett

== See also ==
- Rugby League Competitions in Australia
