= Horizon Airlines (Australia) =

Australian airline

IATA	ICAO	Call sign
BN	HZA	HORIZ AIR
- Commenced operations: 1999
- Ceased operations: November 2003
- Fleet size: 2
- Headquarters: Sydney, New South Wales, Australia

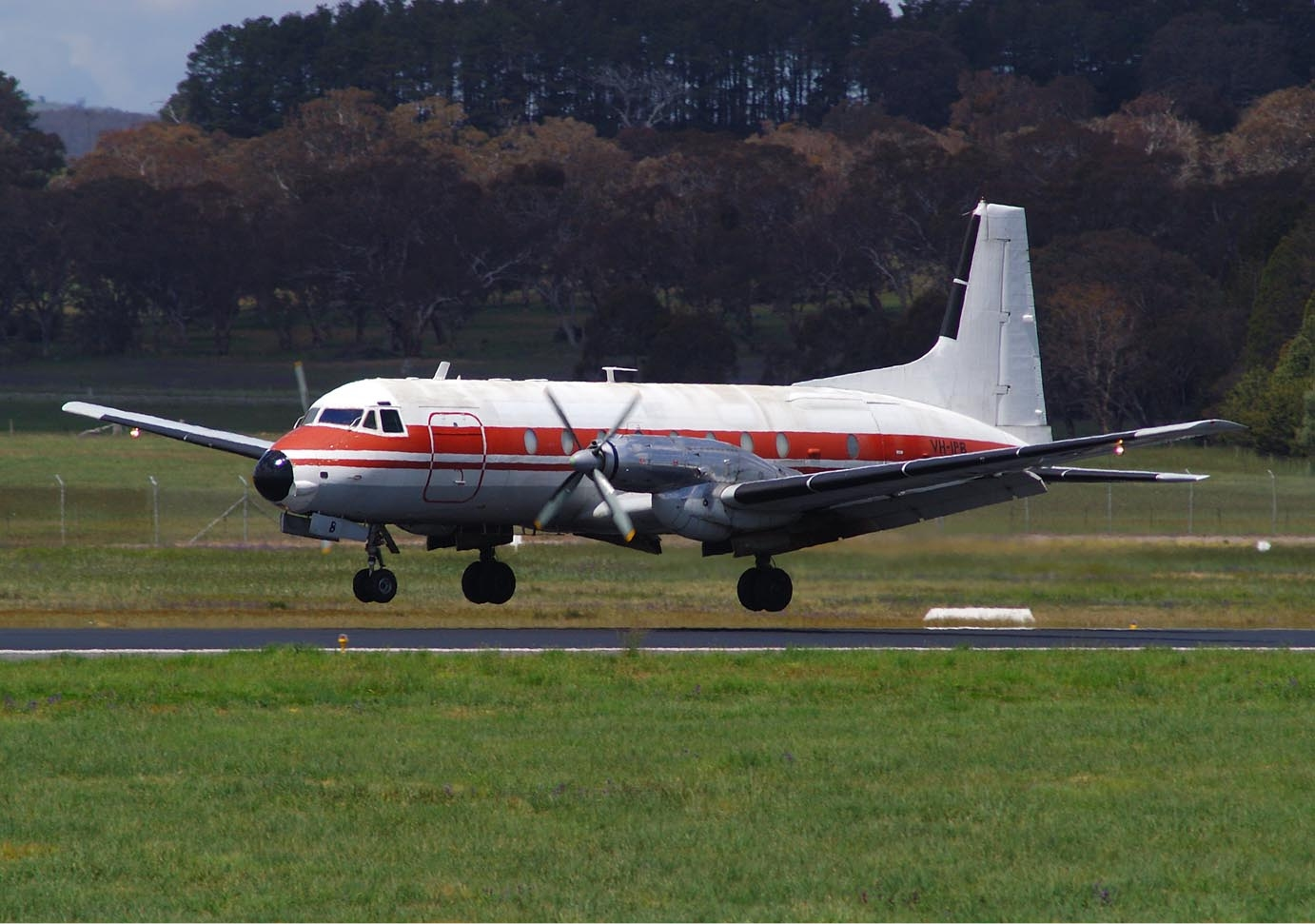
Hawker Siddeley HS 748 at Canberra Airport in 2003

Horizon Airlines was an Australian airline based in Sydney. It predominantly operated night time cargo services under contract to Australian airExpress using Hawker Siddeley HS 748 and Fairchild Metroliner from Sydney to Cooma, Grafton, Kempsey, Newcastle and Taree.

In October 2003 was placed in Voluntary administration. In November 2003 MacAir Airlines acquired the airline with the brand retired.

== Fleet ==
- 1 Fokker F27 Friendship
- 10 Hawker Siddeley HS 748
- 1 Short Skyvan
- 8 Swearingen Merlin
