= Wingham Tigers =

Australian rugby league club, based in Wingham NSW

Club information
- Full name: Wingham District Rugby League Football Club
- Nickname: Tigers
- Short name: Wingham
- Colours: Gold; Black
- Website: http://www.winghamtigers.com/

Current details
- Competition: Group 3 Rugby League

Records
- Premierships: 9 (1950, 1952, 1953, 1961, 1962, 1989, 1997, 2002, 2003, 2026)

The Wingham Tigers are a Rugby League Club from Wingham, New South Wales that participates in Group 3 Rugby League competitions.

== Playing Record ==
Playing record compiled from the club history book and scores published in the Rugby League Week.

Year	Group	Ladder Position	Points	Final Position	Report
1983	3	Minor Semi	25	Semi-Finalist	
1984	3	Major Semi	33	Finalist	
1985	3	7	15		
1986	3	3	28	Grand Finalist	
1987	3	3	29	Finalist	
1988	3	3	19	Semi-Finalist	
1989	3	1	32	Premiers	
1990	3	4	26	Semi-Finalist	
1991	3	3	18	Finalist	
1992	3	Minor Semi		Grand Finalist	
1993	3	Missed Finals	10		
1994	3	Minor Semi	13	Semi-Finalist	
1995	3	Major Semi	32	Finalist	
1996	3	Major Semi	32	Grand Finalist	
1997	3	2	28	Premiers	
1998	3	5	14	Elimination Semi-Final	
1999	3	2	22	Semi-Finalist	
2000	3	7	8		
2001	3	5	14	Elimination Semi-Final	
2002	3	2	20	Premiers	
2003	3	1	26	Premiers	
2004	3	2	27	Grand Finalist	
2005	3	4	22	Elimination Semi-Finalist	
2006	3	6	12		
2007	3	6	16		
2008	3	4	15	Finalist	
2009	3	4	16	Semi-Finalist	
2010	3	3	42	Semi-Finalist	
2011	3	5	41	Elimination Semi-Final	
2012	3	6	18		
2013	3	7	19		
2014	3	5	28	Elimination Semi-Final	
2015	3	5	26	Elimination Semi-Finalist	
2016	3	2	46	Finalist	
2017	3	6	26		
2018	3	3	30	Semi-Finalist	

== Sources ==
- Rugby League Week at State Library of NSW Research and Collections
- Blood, Sweat and Beers : A History of the Wingham District Rugby League Football Club, Graham Steel, 2005, No ISBN.
