= Paul Pyers =

Australian rugby league footballer

Personal information
- Full name: Paul Francis Pyers
- Born: 13 March 1935 South Grafton, New South Wales, Australia
- Died: 12 June 2016 (aged 81)

Playing information
- Position: Halfback, Fullback, Centre, Wing
Club
Years	Team	Pld	T	G	FG	P
1954	Eastern Suburbs	9	3	0	0	9
1960–62	Parramatta Eels	10	5	17	0	49
	Total	19	8	17	0	58

Paul Francis "Pope" Pyers (13 March 1935 – 12 June 2016) was an Australian rugby league footballer in both the New South Wales Rugby League (NSWRL) competition and in Queensland. A versatile performer, he played in every position from fullback to lock forward.

Pyers was born in South Grafton, New South Wales, and played for the South Grafton rugby league team 1950–53. In 1954, he played with Sydney's Eastern Suburbs side. He is recognized as that club's 421st player. The following year Pyers moved to Queensland where he represented the Queensland state team 11 times 1957–59 in matches against NSW, New Zealand, and Great Britain.

In 1959, while playing in Mackay, Queensland, he represented Queensland in all four of its games against New South Wales; Queensland, winning the series 3–1. He played on the wing in three of that year's interstate games and at centre in the fourth. Pyers top scored for Queensland in the series with 20 points from two tries and seven goals. He also played on the wing for Australia Possibles vs. Australia Probables in 1959. Former Australian rugby league vice captain and long time rugby league writer Jack Reardon rated Pyers a glaring omission from the Australian team that toured Britain and France in 1959–60.

In 1960, Pyers returned to the NSWRL, where he played 2 seasons for the Parramatta club.
