= Millbank, New South Wales =

Millbank New South Wales
- Coordinates: 30°45′S 152°53′E
- Postcode(s): 2440
- Elevation: 24.8 m (81 ft)
- LGA(s): Nambucca Shire
- County: Raleigh
- State electorate(s): Oxley
- Federal division(s): Cowper

Millbank, New South Wales is a suburb and locality in Nambucca Shire in New South Wales, Australia.

Millbank, New South Wales is located on the Kempsey to Armidale road. The Millbank area a very beautiful part of the Mid North Coast of New South Wales, with undulating landscape, several State Forests, National Parks and Taylors Arm river, with the Blue mountains in the background. Proximity to the Pacific coast renders the area with high rainfall. The nearest service center is Taylors Arm and there is no coverage for cell phones.

The main industries of Millbank are cedar felling and dairying organic crops, cedar wood works, lemon myrtle, and smaller cottage industries. There is a primary school in Millbank. The song The pub with no Beer was written in Millbank in the 1940s.

Nearby forest areas include:

- Ngambaa Nature reserve
- Collombatti State forest
- Mistake State Forest
- Dunggir National Park
- Thumb Creek national park
