= Bowraville, New South Wales =

Bowraville
- Town
- Coordinates: 30°38′S 152°51′E
- Country: Australia
- State: New South Wales
- LGA: Nambucca Valley Council
- Location: 524 km (326 mi) from Sydney; 402 km (250 mi) from Brisbane

Government
  - State electorate: Oxley
  - Federal division: Cowper
- Elevation: 24.8 m (81 ft)

Population
  - Total: 941 (2021 census)
- Time zone: UTC+10 (AEST)
  - Summer (DST): UTC+11 (AEDT)
- Postcode: 2449
- County: Raleigh
- Gazetted: 6 Oct 1871

Bowraville is a small town in the Mid North Coast hinterland of New South Wales, Australia in the Nambucca Valley. The town is known for tourism with attractions such as a folk museum, a war museum, a historic theatre, and other historic buildings.

Bowraville is considered one of the most disadvantaged towns in New South Wales with low income levels, high unemployment, and a high proportion of students not meeting education standards. On 5 November 2011, however, Bowraville was honoured as the Winner of the Cultural Heritage Award and came third overall in the Tidy Towns Awards by Keep Australia Beautiful – Tidy Towns.

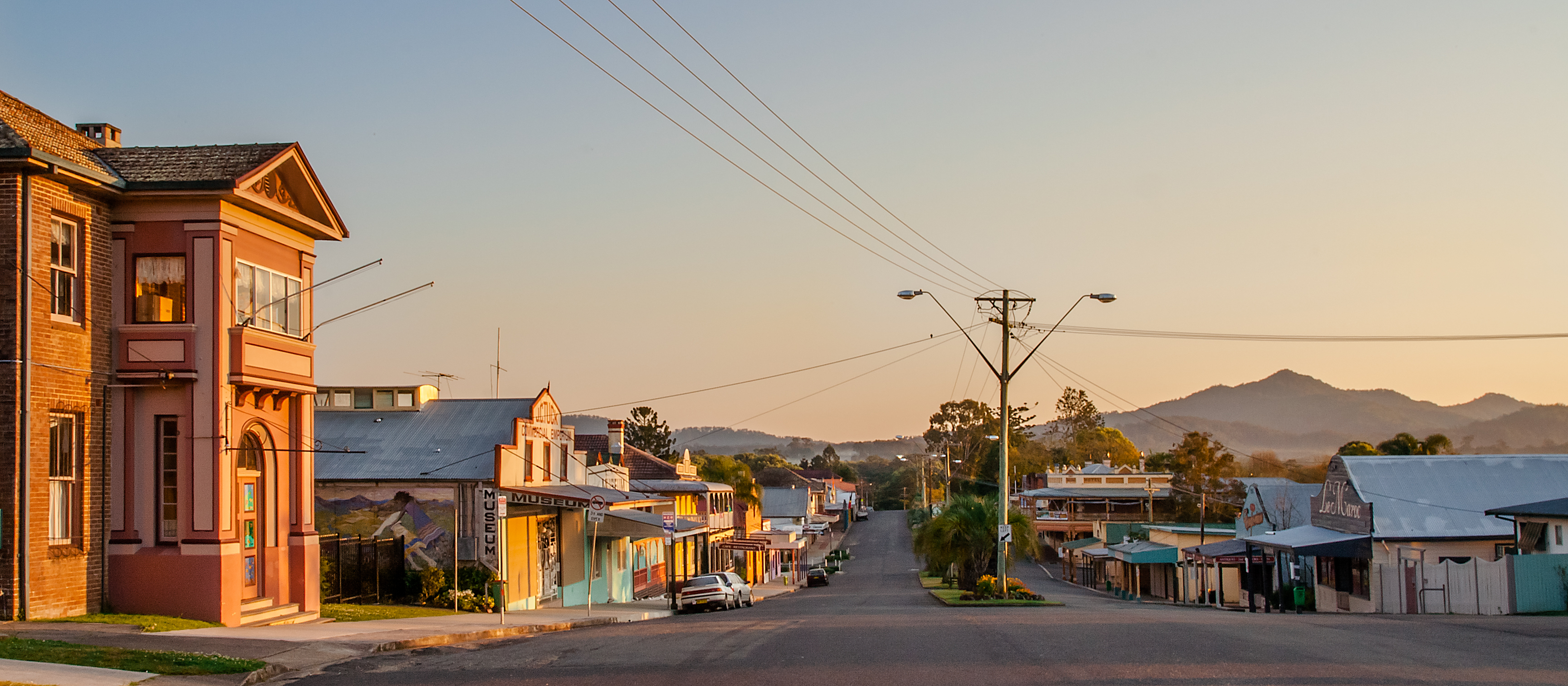
Bowraville

== History ==
The Indigenous Gumbaynggirr and Ngaku people have inhabited the area for thousands of years, and today 20-25% of the population are Indigenous Australians. The Gumbaynggirr lands cover an area of the Mid North Coast from the Nambucca River to as far north as the Clarence River (Grafton), west to Armidale and eastward to the Pacific coast. The area was mostly subtropical scrub and some rainforest until the arrival of Europeans.

In March 1841, Clement Hodgkinson explored the upper reaches of the Nambucca and Bellinger Rivers and found cedar-getters camped where the present racetrack is.

The earliest recorded use of the name "Bowra" was in 1842. The word Bowra possibly comes from the Gumbaynggirr word, Bawrrung, meaning cabbage tree palm. Another definition given has been 'bullrout fish', whose Gumbaynggirr name was said to be rowra, corrupted to Bowra Townsend notes W F Sullivan's formal acceptance of position of post master in 1870, in which Sullivan very carefully printed 'rowra' as the name of the place. Other definitions given have been 'scrub turkey' or 'bald head'.

The Bowraville Post Office opened on 1 August 1870 and the village of Bowra was gazetted on 6 October 1871. It became the main centre of the Nambucca Valley. Its early industries were mainly timber and dairy, and the town eventually came to inherit the Nambucca Shire Council chambers. Originally named Bowra, the ville was added to the name in the 1870s to avoid confusion with the town of Bowna, near Albury, and also Nowra.

=== Timber Industry ===
White settlement began in the area with the timber-getters. The first timber-getter into the area was Mr William Scott (after whom Scotts Head is named). The most popular timber was by far red cedar, of which there are now few trees left. Hoop pine was also popular. Like many Australian timber towns of this era, the town thrived for several decades, and by the 1870s boasted two hotels, several general stores, a blacksmith's, tailor, post office, a school and a number of churches.

=== Agriculture ===
By the 1880s the district was also an important dairy and pig raising area. Timber began to decline as the dominant industry by the early 20th Century, as the supply became scarce. Many jobs have been lost in recent years with the decline of the timber industry however agriculture has diversified from the traditional core of dairy farming to include beef cattle. The area has also seen the development of such activities as macadamia farms, avocado growers, agro forestry, bush foods, alpacas and organic vegetables.

The town remained relatively static throughout the 20th Century but by the 1980s this area of the New South Wales coast was attracting people looking for a better lifestyle. Today this is apparent in venues like the restored historical theatre in the main street.

=== Murders ===
Between 1990 and 1991, three Aboriginal children in Bowraville were murdered. Despite two trials and much publicity, there have been no convictions for the murders. On 26 May 2016, after efforts of the families and two refusals from the Attorneys General, then Attorney General of New South Wales Gabrielle Upton announced that the NSW Court of Criminal Appeal would hear the case. Publicity generated by a popular podcast from The Australian called Bowraville possibly helped finally create enough public pressure to force the Attorney General in this decision.

== Bowra Theatre ==
The Bowraville Theatre has become a popular tourist attraction on the Mid North Coast hinterland. Built in 1940 as a picture theatre, it was derelict for many years but it now operates as a performance space for the local theatre group, writers' group, and choir, as well as in its traditional role as a cinema. The local community brought the theatre back to life, through volunteer work and fund raising. The restored foyer was opened at the end of 2002 and on Friday 29 August 2003, the theatre re-opened its doors. The Indigenous community held a smoking ceremony and performed a welcome dance.

Like many businesses in country towns at the time of its construction, the theatre operated as a racially divided business. Aboriginal people had to buy their tickets separately, enter the theatre by a separate side entrance, sit in inferior seating below an interior partition and were permitted to do so only after the program had begun. As a result, the theatre was a stop-off on the 1965 Freedom Ride which saw students from University of Sydney tour regional NSW to highlight racism against Aboriginal people.

== Demographics ==
Historical population
Year	Pop.	±%
1954	1,047	—
1961	1,003	−4.2%
1966	883	−12.0%
1971	845	−4.3%
1976	801	−5.2%
1981	848	+5.9%
1986	1,024	+20.8%
1991	963	−6.0%
1996	933	−3.1%
2001	954	+2.3%
2006	976	+2.3%
2011	1,090	+11.7%
2016	950	−12.8%
2021	941	−0.9%
Source: Australian Bureau of Statistics data.

According to the 2021 Australian census the population of Bowraville is 941 and the median age is 41. 24.1% of residents are Aboriginal or Torres Strait Islander with the median age among this group being 25. The proportion of Bowraville residents aged 65 and over is higher than that in NSW and Australia generally.

77.5% of residents reported being born in Australia, higher than the national average of 66.9%. Other than Australia the most common countries of birth are England (2.3%), Nepal (1.8%) and Philippines (1.1%). 70% also report both parents having been born in Australia, significantly higher than the national average of 45.9%. 82.8% of people spoke only English at home.

The top religious groups in Bowraville are Catholic 15.6%, Anglican 13.5% and Uniting Church 3.3%. 42% of residents report no religion.

== Local media ==
Radio Stations

hit (105.5 & 105.1), Triple M (2MC-FM 106.7 & 2CS-FM 106.3), Triple J (91.5 & 96.3), 2NVR FM (105.9)

The Nambucca Valley's community radio station, 2NVR 105.9FM, focuses on the Macksville, Bowraville, Nambucca Heads and surrounding communities.

Newspapers

- Hibiscus Happynings (Fairfax) (final issue 25 March 2020 - merged into Midcoast Observer; Midcoast Observer (Fairfax) (final issue issue 26 July 2023 - merged into Macleay Argus); Guardian News (Rural Press then Fairfax) (final issue 25 March 2020 - merged into Macleay Argus; Nambucca Valley News of the Area (NOTA Group); Coffs Coast Advocate (Newscorp) (last print issue 26 June 2020 - merged into Daily Telegraph website).

== Notable people ==
- Rower George Elias was born in Bowraville
- Greg Inglis, a rugby player who started his career in Bowraville
- Billie McKay, a winner of MasterChef Australia, was born in Bowraville
- Les Murdoch, an artist living in Bowraville
- Rugby player Nathan Smith was born in Bowraville
- Tasman Keith, an Australian rapper, was born in Bowraville

== Bibliography ==
- Townsend, Norma (1993). Valley of the Crooked River: European Settlement on the Nambucca. Kensington, New South Wales: New South Wales University Press.
