= Scotts Head, New South Wales =

Suburb in Australia

Scotts Head
- Suburb
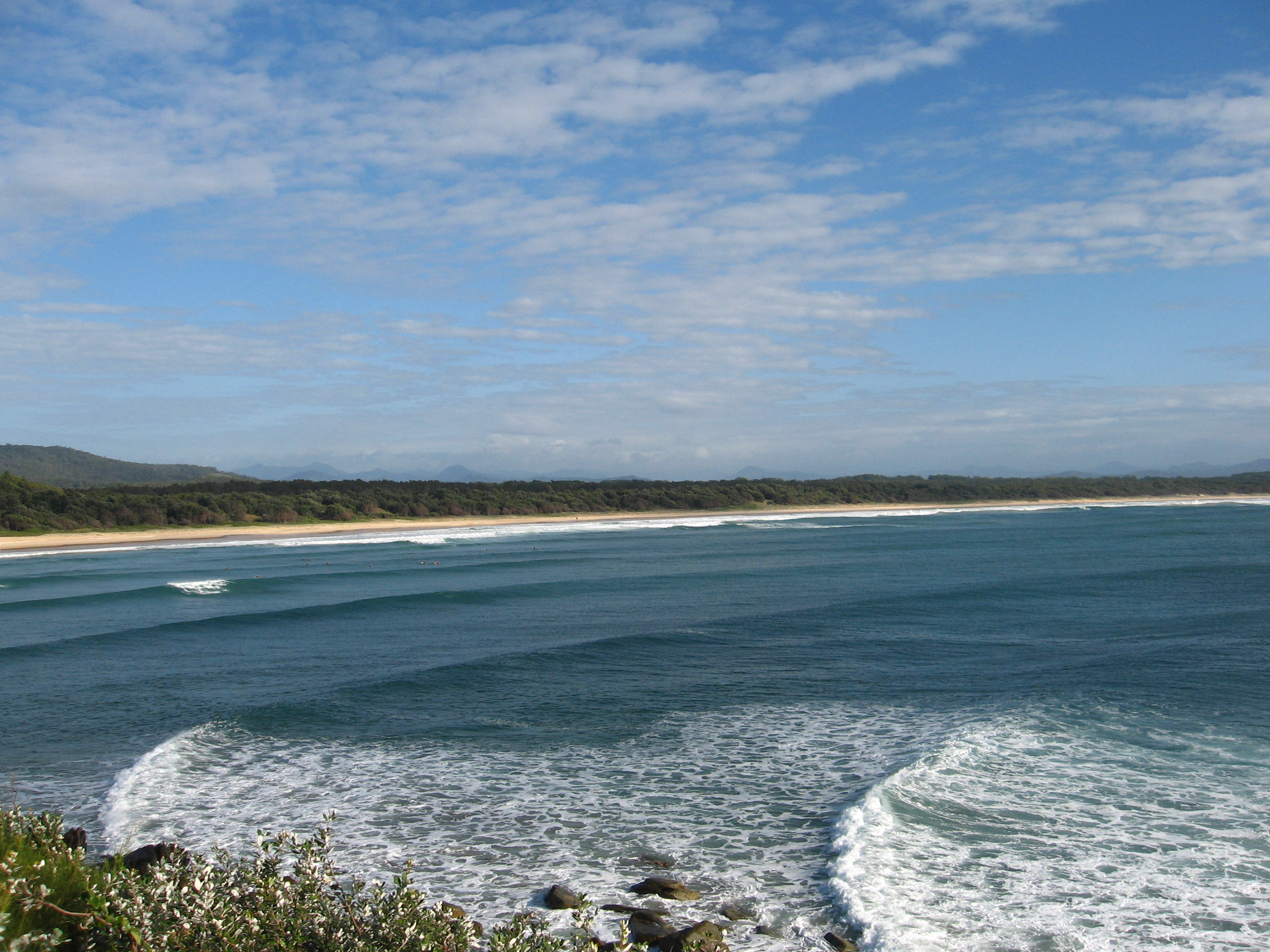
- Scotts Head beach looking north

- Coordinates: 30°42′S 152°59′E
- Country: Australia
- State: New South Wales
- Region: Mid North Coast
- LGA: Nambucca Valley Council
- Location: 19 km (12 mi) S of Nambucca Heads; 54 km (34 mi) NNE of Kempsey

Government
  - State electorate: Oxley
  - Federal division: Cowper

Population
  - Total: 986 (2021 census)
- Postcode: 2447
- County: Raleigh
- Parish: Congarinni

Scotts Head is a coastal village of the Nambucca Valley local government area in the Mid North Coast region of New South Wales, Australia. Located on the coast of the Pacific Ocean, approximately 10 kilometres (6 mi) from the Pacific Highway and 480 kilometres (300 mi) from Sydney, it stretches southwards from just south of the mouth of the Nambucca River to the town of Scotts Head in the south.

== History ==
The area's original inhabitants are the Gumbaynggirr people. The town, which had a population of 986 at the 2021 census is named after the area's first white settler, William Scott.

The town has a shopping complex called Scotts Head Central, a bakery, a butchery, a bottle shop, a local fish monger and coffee shop, and a real estate agent. It also has a caravan park with cabins that line the main beach. For recreation, there is a surf-lifesaving club and a bowling club.

Scotts Head is the site of a small public school which is attended by around 110 students. In 2010, the town opened the first and only English-Indonesian bilingual school in the country.

== Tourism ==
Scotts Head is popular with surfers because of the headlands projecting into the ocean in three directions, and the choice of two beaches: Little or Back beach, and the main beach stretching to the mouth of the Nambucca River. Scotts Head is known for right handed surf breaks, it is occasionally visited by turtles, and offshore is part of the whale migratory route.

The beach areas were the traditional home of the local indigenous tribe, due to once abundant fish stocks and the availability of fresh water from two natural fresh water pools that were located close to the main headland, which is known locally as "the point".

According to the 'Guinness Book of Records', Scotts Head boasts the largest variety of reptiles available anywhere in the world in one place, including several varieties of lizards and many of Australia's most poisonous snakes. Brown snakes and Red-bellied black snakes, along with the smaller Death Adder found at the back of the sand dunes along the tracks, can be spotted travelling through the open spaces and parks near to the beaches during their Summer breeding season.

== Local media ==
Radio Stations
Triple M (2CS-FM 106.3 and 2MC-FM 106.7), hit (105.5 & 105.1), Triple J (91.5 & 96.3), 2NVR FM (105.9)
The Nambucca Valley's community radio station, 2NVR 105.9FM, focuses on the Macksville, Bowraville, Scotts Head, Nambucca Heads and surrounding communities.

Newspapers
Midcoast Observer, Hibiscus Happynings, Guardian News.

Television
ABC, ABC2, SBS, SBS News, Prime Coffs Harbour (Seven), WIN (Ten), NBN (Nine)

== Gallery ==
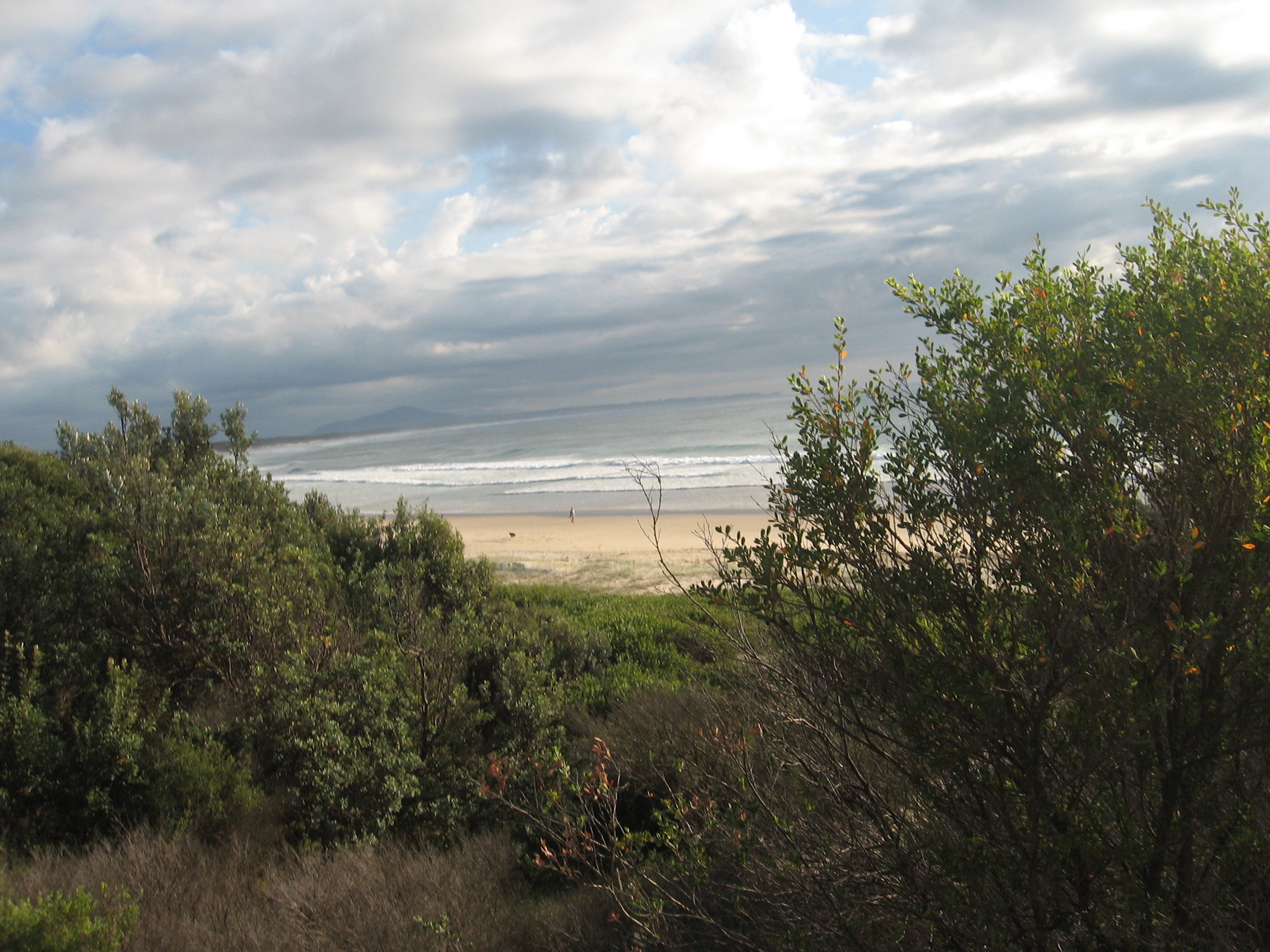
Scotts Head Beach in the early morning.

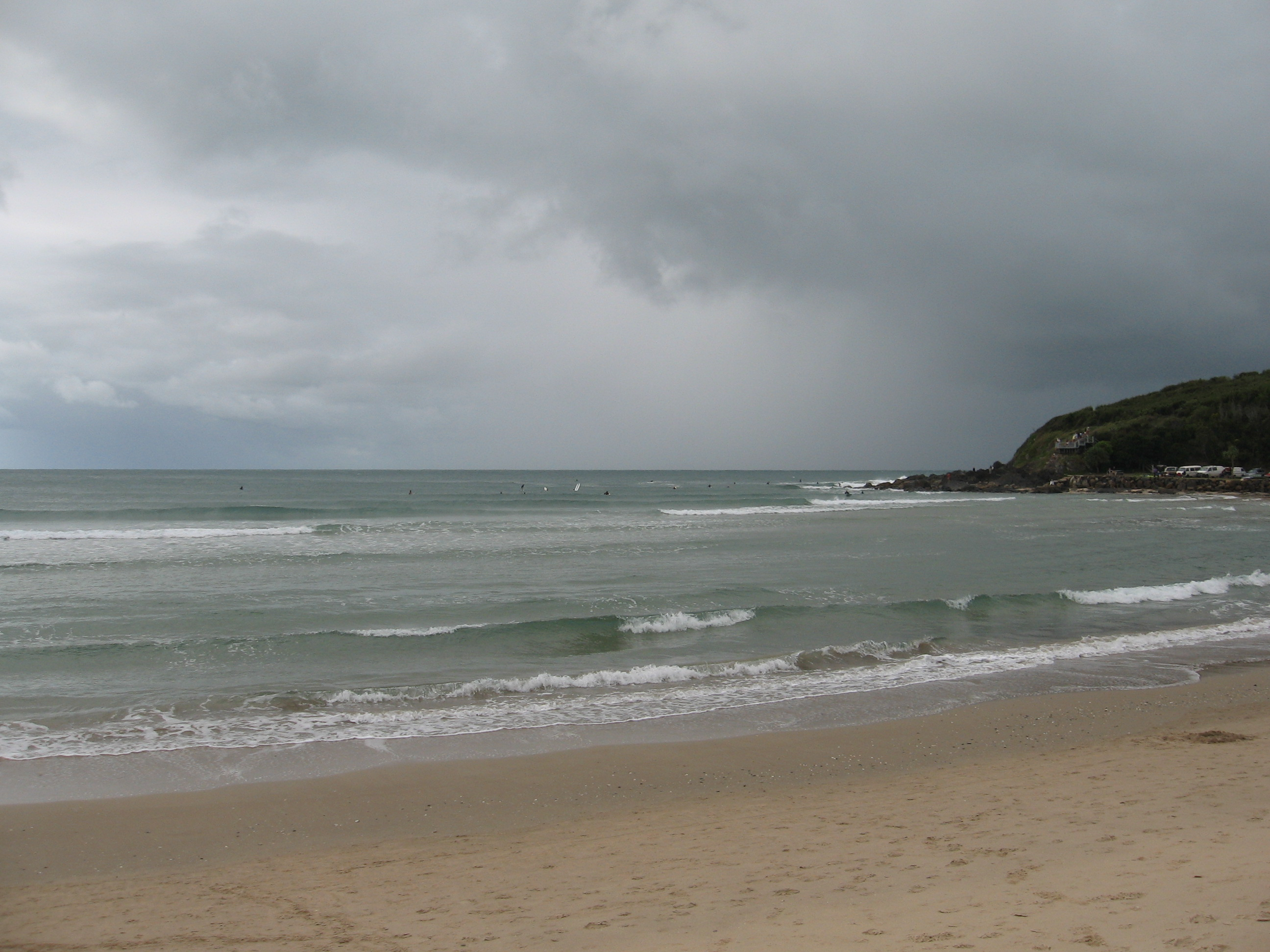
Looking down the beach towards the headland.

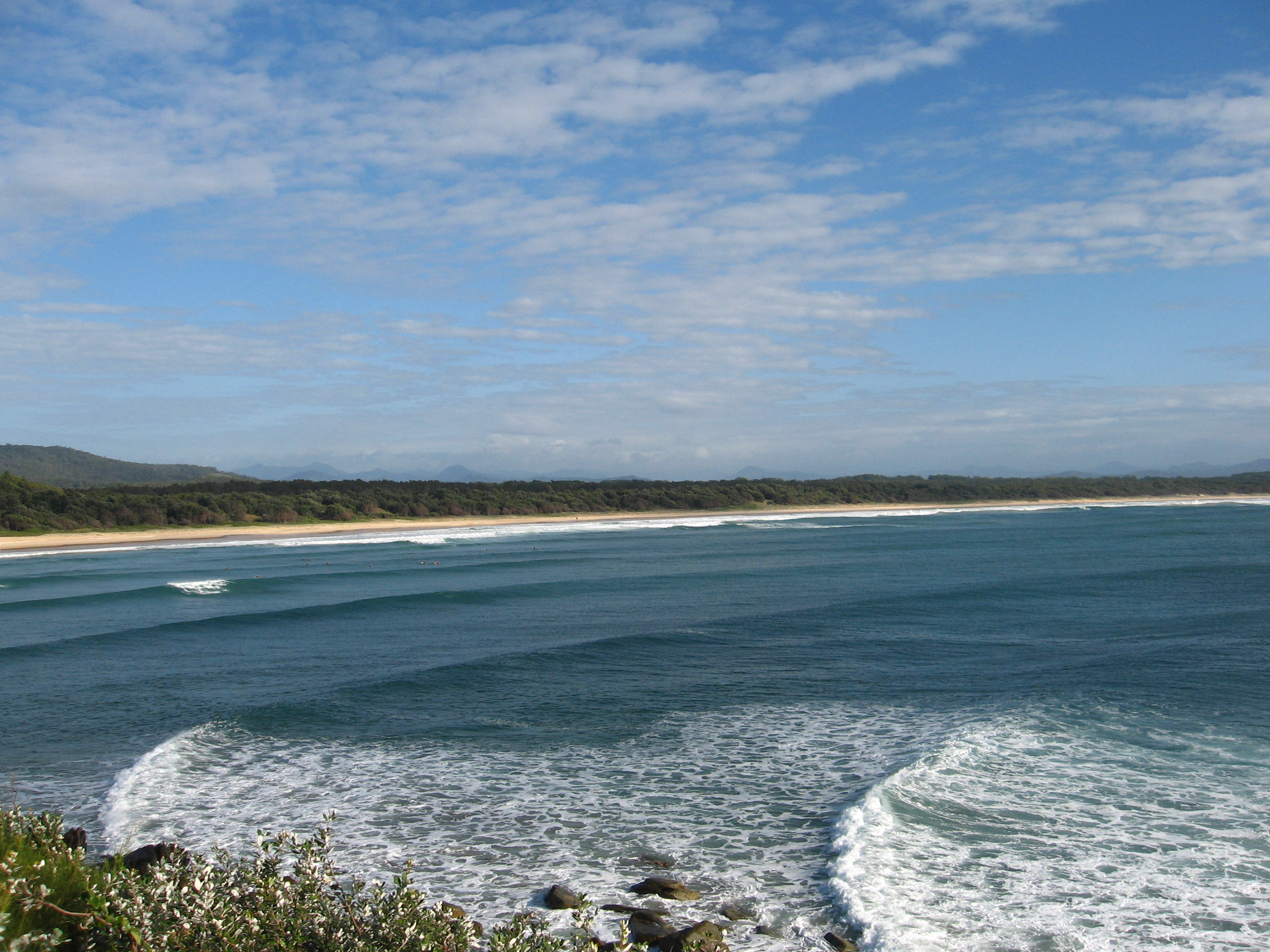
main beach headland
