= Raleigh, New South Wales =

Raleigh
- Town
- Coordinates: 30°28′S 152°59′E
- Country: Australia
- State: New South Wales
- LGA: Bellingen Shire
- Location: 510 km (320 mi) NE of Sydney; 24 km (15 mi) S of Coffs Harbour; 16 km (9.9 mi) E of Bellingen; 27 km (17 mi) N of Nambucca Heads

Government
  - State electorate: Oxley
  - Federal division: Cowper
- Elevation: 7 m (23 ft)

Population
  - Total: 681 (2021 census)
- Postcode: 2454
Localities around Raleigh
Valery	Repton	Sawtell
Fernmount	Raleigh	Mylestom
Brierfield	Urunga	Urunga

Raleigh (/rɑːli/; RAH-lee) is a small town in the Mid North Coast region of New South Wales, Australia, in Bellingen Shire. At the 2011 census, Raleigh had a population of 550. The town is south of Coffs Harbour and Sawtell and north of Nambucca Heads. It is located in Raleigh County and is perhaps named after it. It has one school, Raleigh Public School, which is located opposite a Norco dairy factory. A railway station on the North Coast line opened in 1915, but was subsequently closed and demolished.

Preceding station	Former services	Following station
Repton towards Brisbane	North Coast Line	Urunga towards Maitland
