= Never Never River =

River in New South Wales, Australia

Never Never River Never Never Creek, North Creek

Location
- Country: Australia
- State: New South Wales
- IBRA: NSW North Coast
- District: Mid North Coast
- local government area: Bellingen

Physical characteristics
- Source: Eastern slopes of the Dorrigo Plateau
  - location: Tallowpoint, near Dorrigo
  - coordinates: 30.32219°S 152.83227°E
  - elevation: 82 m (269 ft)
- Mouth: confluence with the Bellinger River
  - location: near Gordonville, northwest of Bellingen
  - coordinates: 30.40970°S 152.85287°E
  - elevation: 18 m (59 ft)
- Length: 9 km (5.6 mi)

Basin features
- River system: Bellinger River catchment
- National park: Dorrigo National Park

Never Never River, a perennial stream of the Bellinger River catchment, is located in the Mid North Coast region of New South Wales, Australia.

== Course and features ==
Never Never River rises on the eastern slopes of the Dorrigo Plateau, near Tallowood Point, east northeast of Dorrigo within the Dorrigo National Park, and flows generally southeast and southwest, before reaching its confluence with the Bellinger River, near Gordonville, northwest of Bellingen. The river descends 64 metres (210 ft) over its 9 kilometres (5.6 mi) course.

== See also ==
- List of rivers of Australia
