= Taylors Arm (New South Wales) =

Coordinates: 30°39′S 153°01′E

Location
- Country: Australia
- State: New South Wales
- Region: NSW North Coast (IBRA), Mid North Coast
- local government area: Nambucca
- Town: Macksville

Physical characteristics
- Source: Killiekrankie Mountain, Dorrigo Plateau, Great Dividing Range
  - location: New England National Park
  - elevation: 235 m (771 ft)
- Mouth: confluence with the Nambucca River
  - location: Macksville
- Length: 83 km (52 mi)

Basin features
- Tributaries
  - left: Bakers Creek (New South Wales)
  - right: Thumb Creek
- National park: New England

Taylors Arm is a perennial river of the Nambucca River catchment, located in the Mid North Coast region of New South Wales, Australia.

== Course and features ==
Taylors Arm rises within New England National Park on the eastern slopes of Killiekrankie Mountain, below the Dorrigo Plateau that is part of the Great Dividing Range. The river flows generally southeast and then east northeast, joined by two minor tributaries, before reaching its confluence with the Nambucca River northwest of Macksville. The river descends 235 metres (771 ft) over its 83 kilometres (52 mi) course.

== See also ==
- List of rivers of New South Wales (L–Z)
- List of rivers of Australia
- Rivers of New South Wales
- Taylors Arm
