= Archville =

Archville may refer to:

- Archville, New South Wales
- Archville, New York
