= Repton, New South Wales =

Repton New South Wales
- Coordinates: 30°26′10″S 153°01′50″E
- Population: 667 (2021 census)
- Postcode(s): 2454
- Location: 23 km (14 mi) S of Coffs Harbour; 514 km (319 mi) NNE of Sydney
- LGA(s): Bellingen Shire
- State electorate(s): Coffs Harbour; Oxley
- Federal division(s): Cowper

Repton is a small town in New South Wales, Australia, located near the mouth of the Bellinger River. At the 2021 census, Repton had a population of 667 people.

A railway station on the North Coast line was open between 1916 and 1974.

== Schools ==
- Repton Public School

== Notable residents ==
- Dick Smith – entrepreneur

Preceding station	Former services	Following station
Archville towards Brisbane	North Coast Line	Raleigh towards Maitland
