= Hammond and Wheatley Commercial Emporium =

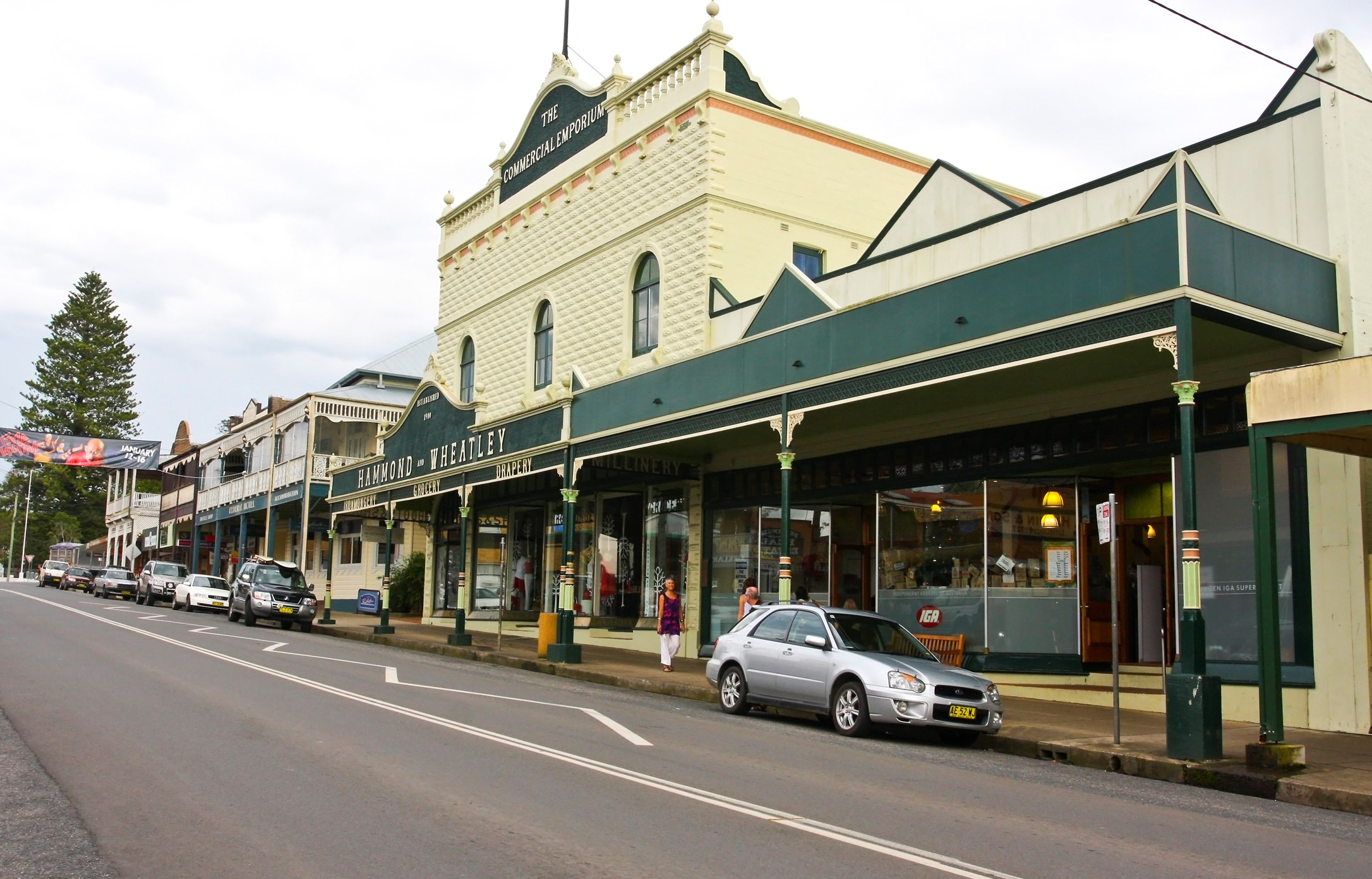
- Hammand on Wheatly Commercial Emporium, main street, 2008

- Location within New South Wales Location within Australia
- 30.4518°S 152.8964°E
- Location: 69–75 Hyde Street, Bellingen, Bellingen Shire, New South Wales, Australia

History
- Built: 1908–1909

Site notes
- Architect: George Edward Moore
- Owner: Davpond Pty. Ltd.

New South Wales Heritage Register
- Official name: Hammond and Wheatley Commercial Emporium
- Type: state heritage (built)
- Designated: 2 April 1999
- Reference no.: 186
- Type: Shop
- Category: Retail and Wholesale
- Builders: George Edward Moore

Hammond and Wheatley Commercial Emporium is a heritage-listed commercial building at 69–75 Hyde Street, Bellingen on the Mid North Coast in New South Wales, Australia. It was designed by George Edward Moore and built by Moore from 1908 to 1909. The property is owned by Davpond Pty. Ltd. It was added to the New South Wales State Heritage Register on 2 April 1999.

== History ==
In 1900 W. J. Hammond and A. E. Wheatley purchased The Reform Store and changed the name to Hammond & Wheatley Pty Ltd. They built the business up to such an extent the building was not large enough and they decided to extend.

The two storey premises were constructed over the original Hammond & Wheatley store which began operations in 1900. The current building, Australia's first cement brick building, was completed in 1909. George Moore cast a sign on the front of the building claiming he was both the architect and the builder. In a small village, the project was a grand one. It is likely that the proprieters were influenced by grand shopping arcades such as 'The Strand" and "The Queen Victoria Building".

The store serviced the local areas by bullock team and boat. Its remarkable success and ensuing prosperity made possible the erection of a single storey addition in 1917. Wheatley died early but the business remained in the Hammond family until 1988.

The 1908–09 building was one of the first buildings in Australia to be made of concrete block. George Moore was an extremely innovative builder and had imported a machine from America to build the blocks with. He put the machine to good use, building a number of other premises using the blocks. The Emporium was also one of the first buildings in Bellingen to use rolled steel beams as few buildings had previously had the scale to warrant this type of construction.

In the mid-1980s the exterior of the building was reconstructed, having deteriorated very badly over the passing years. During the reconstruction the shop continued to operate along its traditional lines, selling principally clothing and fabrics. However, a door was opened through to the next door supermarket and a small museum for local displays was built on the first floor.

In 1988 redevelopment of Hammond & Wheatley was begun under the new owner. A cafe was added and the ground floor was subdivided into three shops. The subdivision was sympathetic to the floor and little else of the interior was altered.

== Description ==
The emporium is a two-storey building constructed of concrete blocks. Steel beams support the first floor front facade and were initially used to span across the shop windows below. Steel beams are also used within the floor to increase the available floor span. The beams are supported by slender steel columns which have been encased in timber and mirrors.

The ground floor is constructed of conventional timber framing with hardwood boarding. The first floor is in hardwood framing and boarding but panelled on the underside with an ornate "Wunderlich" pressed metal ceiling.

The roof is a trussed roof, sheeted on top with galvanised corrugated steel and internally with pine tongue and groove boards. At the centre of the roof is a high clerestory surrounded by pivoting opening sashes.

The joinery in the turned posts on the top floor and the handrail around the mezzanine and staircase are made from local timbers - cedar, rosewood and hoop pine. An awning extends over the footpath. Shop fittings do not generally survive.

The building is generally intact, having been restored.

== Heritage listing ==
The Hammond & Wheatley Commercial Emporium is a rare two-storey commercial building type, formerly common in regional areas. The construction of concrete block and large steel beams is unusual for the Federation period. Considerable original detail remains including decorative cement render to the facade, pressed metal ceilings and cedar joinery.

Hammond and Wheatley Commercial Emporium was listed on the New South Wales State Heritage Register on 2 April 1999 having satisfied the following criteria.

The place is important in demonstrating the course, or pattern, of cultural or natural history in New South Wales.

Associative - Its association with the commercial development of the town

The place is important in demonstrating aesthetic characteristics and/or a high degree of creative or technical achievement in New South Wales.

Its contribution to the visual character of the main street of the settlement and the architectural quality of detail and the intactness of the fabric.

The place has potential to yield information that will contribute to an understanding of the cultural or natural history of New South Wales.

An early example of the use of concrete blocks

The place possesses uncommon, rare or endangered aspects of the cultural or natural history of New South Wales.

Aesthetically rare
