= Scotts Head =

Scotts Head may refer to:

- Scotts Head, New South Wales, a town in Australia
- Scotts Head, Dominica, a village in the south of Dominica
