= Raleigh County =

Raleigh County may refer to:

- Raleigh County, West Virginia, United States
- Raleigh County, New South Wales, Australia
