= Valla, New South Wales =

Valla New South Wales
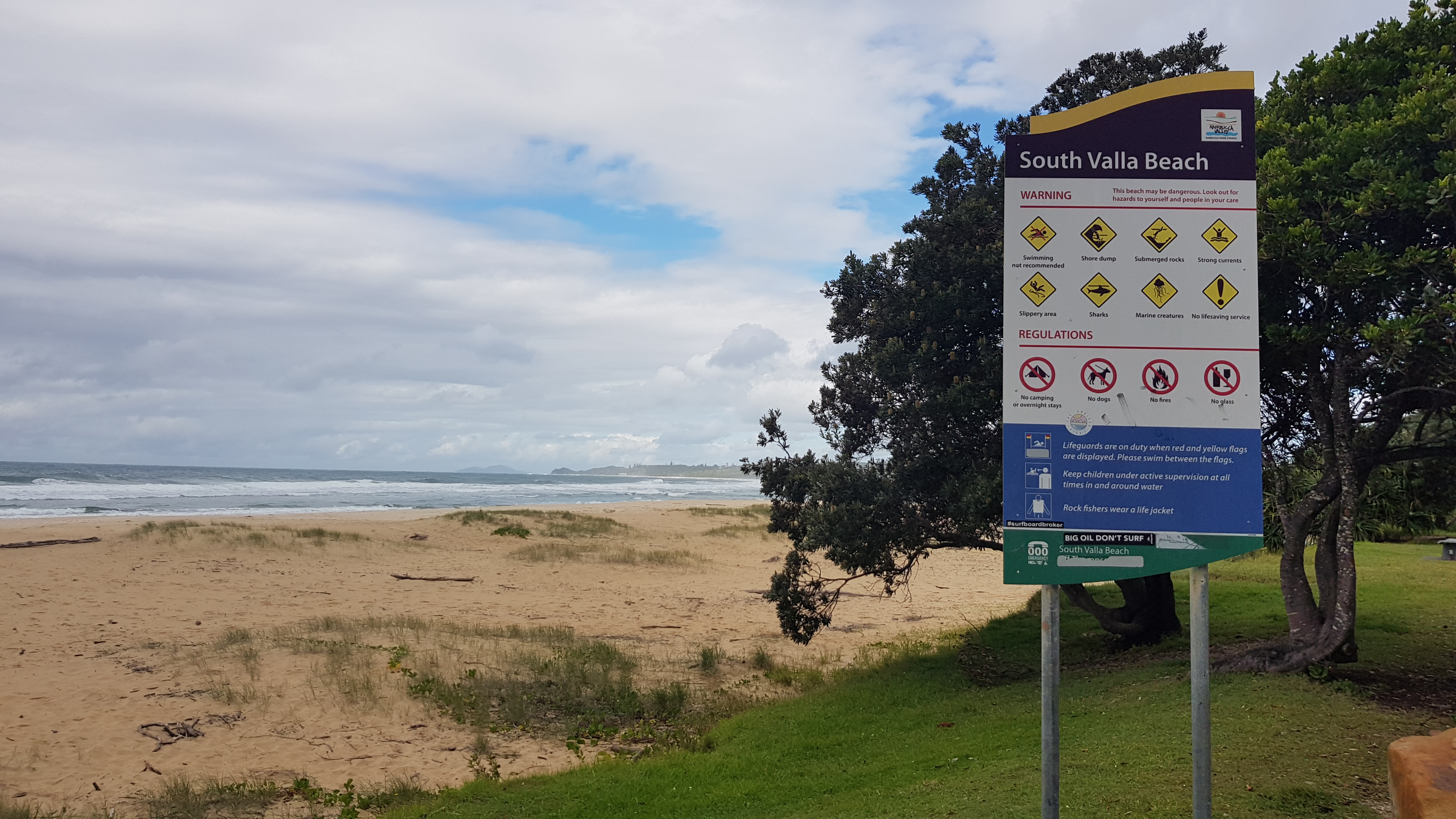
- South Valla Beach, 2023

- Coordinates: 30°36′S 152°59′E
- Population: 1,455 (2021 census)
- Postcode(s): 2448
- Location: 7 km (4 mi) north of Nambucca Heads; 33 km (21 mi) south of Coffs Harbour
- LGA(s): Nambucca Valley Council
- State electorate(s): Oxley
- Federal division(s): Cowper

Valla is a suburb in the Nambucca Valley, on the Mid North Coast of New South Wales, Australia. The name was chosen to match that of the British residence of nineteenth century diplomat Andrew Buchanan.

== History ==
Deep Creek Post Office opened on 16 November 1905, was renamed Valla in 1906 and closed in 1942.

== Surfing ==
Valla Beach has a range of surf spots. South Beach is usually an easy wave but with swell can get fun for experienced surfers. North Valla is a wave for the more experienced surfers. It is known for its long right over rocks and further down the beach has a fast A-frame good for all surfers in average swells.

== Demographics ==
The population of Valla is predominantly Australian-born (80.8%) and English-speaking (90.1%). Places of birth other than Australia include England, New Zealand, Germany, Canada, and Malaysia. Valla residents are significantly older than the state average of 39, with the median age being 55 years old.

== Industries and services ==
The village was formerly a logging town, surrounded by red cedar forest. A remnant logging industry remains as part of the adjacent state forests administered by the New South Wales Department of Primary Industries. More recent industries include macadamia plantations and tourism.

Village services include a pub, pharmacy, real estate agent, cafe/general store, community preschool and a caravan park. The nearby Valla Beach is well known for surfing.

A railway station was located in the village on the North Coast railway between 1939 and 1974.

Preceding station	Former services	Following station
Dalhousie Creek towards Brisbane	North Coast Line	Nambucca Heads towards Maitland
