= Nathan Smith (rugby league, born 1988) =

Australian rugby league footballer

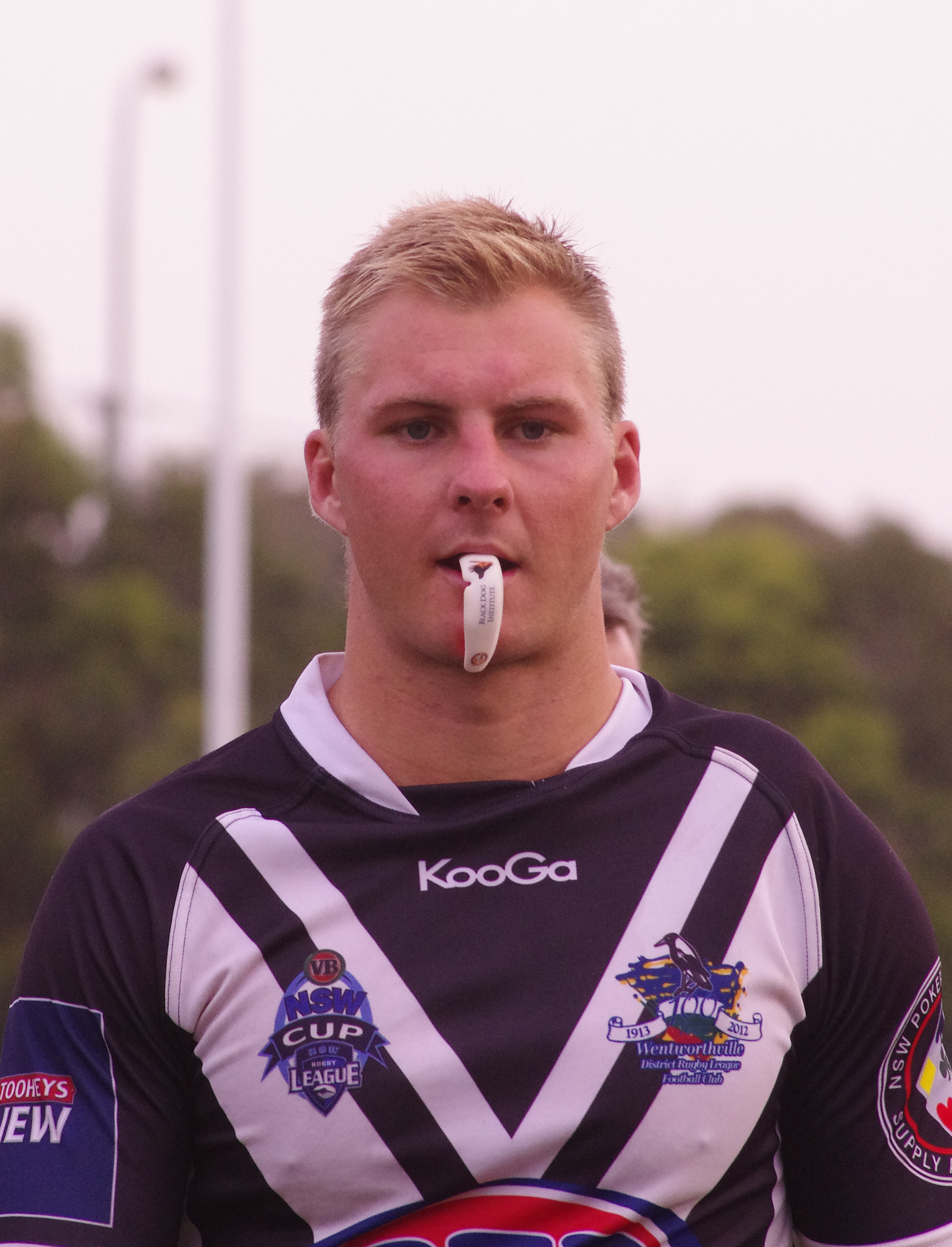
- Smith playing for the Wentworthville Magpies in 2012

Personal information
- Born: 17 July 1988 (age 38) Bowraville, New South Wales, Australia
- Height: 182 cm (6 ft 0 in)
- Weight: 84 kg (13 st 3 lb)

Playing information
- Position: Hooker
Club
| Years | Team | Pld | T | G | FG | P |
|---|---|---|---|---|---|---|
| 2012 | Parramatta Eels | 9 | 1 | 0 | 0 | 4 |
- Source: As of 17 February 2018

Nathan Smith (born 17 July 1988) is an Australian professional rugby league footballer. He previously played for the Parramatta Eels of the National Rugby League. He primarily plays as a hooker.

== Early life ==
Born in Bowraville, New South Wales, Smith played his junior football for the Bowraville Tigers before being signed by the Canterbury-Bankstown Bulldogs.

== Rugby league career ==
=== 2008-2010: Early playing career ===
He played for Canterbury's Toyota Cup team in 2008, playing 20 games before moving on to the Canterbury NSW Cup reserve-grade team in 2009.

=== 2011: Move to Parramatta ===
At the end of 2011, Smith signed with the Parramatta Eels after a lack of first-grade opportunities at the Canterbury-Bankstown club.

=== 2012: First-grade debut ===
In round 18 of the 2012 NRL season he made his NRL debut for the Eels against the Manly-Warringah Sea Eagles after Parramatta hooker, Matt Keating was injured during the warm-up. Smith replaced Keating for the rest of the 2012 NRL season after Keating was ruled out for the rest of the year. On 12 September 2012, Smith was named at hooker in the 2012 NSW Cup Team of the Year.

=== 2013 ===
In June 2013, Smith was one of 12 Parramatta players that were told that their futures at the club were uncertain by coach, Ricky Stuart.
