= Les Murdoch =

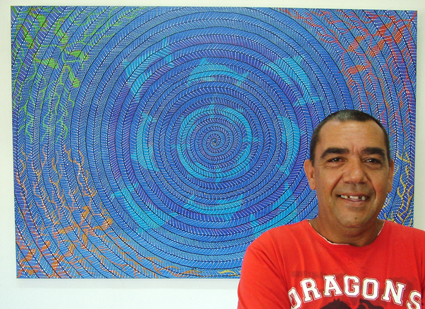
Les Murdoch with one of his paintings in 2005

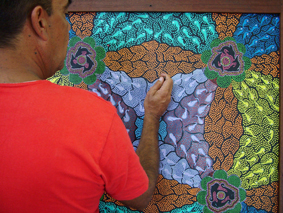
Les Murdoch at work in 2005

Les Murdoch (born 1957), based in Bowraville, New South Wales, Australia is a contemporary artist who began painting in the mid-1990s.

Completely self-taught, Murdoch has developed his own style, and is recognized as the pioneer of a new movement of art: Aboriginal Op art Surrealism. The style is described as a combination of indigenous dot painting and op art illusions with surreal qualities.

Les began painting in his unique style in the mid 90's and from 2005, displayed his work at the Bowraville Art Gallery at the invitation of Gallery Curator Darren Green. Describing Murdoch's work in 2005, gallery curator Darren Green said “Les is the Pioneer of a new aboriginal art movement called Aboriginal Op Art Surrealism, there is nothing else like it in the world. Les sold out his first exhibition after partnering with Darren at the Bowraville Art Gallery, his second at The Sydney Art Show also sold out and he has been busy with commissioned works and several other exhibitions ever since. Les also had the honour of being visited by Dame Marie Roslyn Bashir AD CVO, the Governor of New South Wales and her husband in 2005 after they requested to meet him and see his artworks personally at the Art Gallery during their visit to Bowraville in 2005.

Les was also invited to enter one of his paintings into The Indigenous Art Prize 2005 at NSW Parliament House later that year, with other recognized Aboriginal Artists such as Margaret Adams, Douglas Keith Ah-See, Terrence Allen, Shirley Amos, Brook Andrew, Bronwyn Bancroft, Roy Barker Jnr, Thelma Bartman, Badger (WB) Bates, Leonie Binge, Brenda L. Croft, Mandy Davis, Joy Duncan, Geoffrey Ferguson, Adam Hill, Beverley (Aunty May) Hinch, Brian Irving, Colin Isaacs, Warwick Keen, Gus Kelly, Anthony Kelly, Roy D Kennedy, Sonia Kennedy, Graham Davis King, Beverly L. King, Danielle Mate, Neville McGrady, Neville McKenzie, Lesley John Murdoch, Gail Naden, Brett Parker, Frances Bell Parker, Matthew T. Priestly, Kelly Roach, Elaine Russell, Jeffrey Samuels, Brenda Saunders, Regina (rea) M Saunders, James Simon, Renee Smith, Ross Smith, Jack Soewardie, Barrina South, Jean South, Gordon Syron, Esme Timbery (Russell), Leeanne Tobin, Daphne Wallace, Donella Waters, Colin Wightman, Alison Williams, Shane Williams, Rex Winston.

"

Although not a qualified teacher, Les has also been involved in a mentor program through the Junuy's Aboriginal Youth Project where he has personally encouraged aboriginal youths to pursue their love for art.
