= Macksville Post Office =

- Location within New South Wales
- 30.7067°S 152.9207°E
- Location: Corner of Cooper and River streets, Macksville, New South Wales, Australia

Commonwealth Heritage List
- Official name: Macksville Post Office
- Type: Listed place (Historic)
- Designated: 8 November 2011
- Reference no.: 106127

Macksville Post Office is a heritage-listed post office on the corner of Cooper and River streets, Macksville, New South Wales, Australia. It was added to the Australian Commonwealth Heritage List on 8 November 2011.

== History ==
The Nambucca Post Office opened in Macksville on 1 August 1868 and was renamed Macksville Post Office in 1889. However, as the population in the area grew, the post office became inadequate, leading to an announcement in 1912 to erect a new post office at a new location. However, there were issues over purchase of a new site, and in 1914 it was decided that the existing post office would suffice and the need for a new post office would be reconsidered in 1915–1916. By 1915, there was considerable local agitation for the construction of a new post office, with one of the residents describing the existing post office as "a medium sized dog kennel". Through 1916, there were numerous promises made to construct the new post office, but it was not until January 1917 that residents were advised that the Department of Works & Railways were instructed to build the post office. The new Macksville Post Office opened for business on Monday 18 February 1918 without any ceremony.

Macksville Post Office was designed and constructed c. 1917. It was built with a small free-standing telephone exchange beside it, on River Street, which now serves as a mail contractors space. Recent additions include a new private box area, toilets and a lunch/staff room.

The National Inventory of Federation Places lists Macksville Post Office as, "one of the first two post offices built entirely by the Commonwealth from 1917".

The building was designed by the Commonwealth Department of Works and Railways (NSW Branch) under the direction of George Oakeshott with E. Ferguson probably being the design architect.

== Description ==
Macksville Post Office is on the southwest corner of Cooper and River streets, just south of the Nambucca Bridge. It comprises the whole of Lot 1 DP816339. The L-shaped building is expressed in two face brick arms projecting east and north, each fronted with a trio of double-hung timber framed sash windows, single-paned to the lower sash and six-paned in the upper. The face brick is capped by a stucco frieze below the eaves line that cuts across the grouped windows about 30 cm below their heads. The frieze facing Cooper Street carries the inscription MACKSVILLE POST OFFICE. The entry is via an oblong porch between the two wings, and linked to the roofline with a shared pitch line. The porch is supported at the intersection corner by a pair of face brick piers. The roof, clad in corrugated galvanised iron, is a shallow hipped roof, and all pitches are fairly low, brought out to a shallow fascia that is largely concealed behind the guttering. The eaves project c. 60 cm out from the walls, providing some northern and eastern sun shading. The soffits appear to follow the roof pitch. The rafters are exposed on the original section, and the soffit is lined with timber boards, as is the porch ceiling.

The projecting north front, facing the river, houses the retail area, and the projecting east front, facing Cooper Street, is now the back office. Two pedestrian ramps have been built up across the Cooper Street frontage. They are paved in a brick tile, as is the porch area.

A later addition houses the lunch room and a Post Office box bay, set back from the original Cooper Street frontage, was added after that, probably in the 1970s or early 1980s. The lunch room may have replaced an open, southeast facing porch on the south side of the Cooper Street breakfront, where earlier PO box installations were common. The back yard has an original bicycle shed which has been relined on its exposed face with "hardiplank". An old garage stands at the end of the Cooper Street yard and is now used for storage. Locker rooms and toilets are located behind the PO box areas. The postal manager has an office in a projecting area to the rear, with an attached storeroom. This office has been completely refurbished in recent times.

A former Telecom Australia shed, facing River Street, now houses the contractors' back office, and is sited next to the bicycle shed. The telephone exchange shed is timber-lined and weatherboard clad and in need of repair. It contains a double hung timber framed window which is only visible from within the bicycle store.

=== Condition ===
The building is in good condition generally given its age and changes in use.

Externally Macksville Post Office's integrity is good with respect to the original concept and design. Changes since that period have been to the south side and away from the principal view from the road intersection. Accretions such as signage, pavements, ramped access and lighting are minor, and have not diminished the overall integrity of this building.

Internally, changes are minimal especially in the public space which still retains its original ceiling. Visually it remains a Federation building. One fireplace remains but is bricked in. The chimney remains in place. The original rendered walls with expressed dado moulding and some picture rails are still in situ. The current post office fit-outs include modern shelving systems, furnishings and fit-out that tend to obscure the original fixtures, windows and doors.

The former telephone exchange, a freestanding structure beside the post office, was converted to mail contractors space.

The additions of the private box area, toilets and lunch space, probably occurred during the 1980s.

== Heritage listing ==
Macksville Post Office was listed on the Australian Commonwealth Heritage List on 8 November 2011 having satisfied the following criteria.

Criterion A: Processes

Macksville Post Office, constructed in 1917, is of historical significance as one of the first two New South Wales post offices, along with Botany Post Office, designed by Commonwealth architects. Although extended and modified, the building still presents as a 1917-era structure. The free-standing timber-clad telephone exchange is extant, although in poor condition and no longer used for its original function.
