= Dalhousie Creek =

Coordinates: 30°31′S 153°02′E

Dalhousie Creek is a small coastal creek on the North Coast of New South Wales, Australia. Its entrance lies just to the south of Hungry Head. It is crossed by the North Coast railway line, and a small station was located there between 1943 and 1963.

Preceding station	Former services	Following station
Urunga towards Brisbane	North Coast Line	Valla towards Maitland
