= Nambucca River =

River in Australia

Coordinates: 30°39′S 153°01′E

Nambucca River North Creek, Bowra River
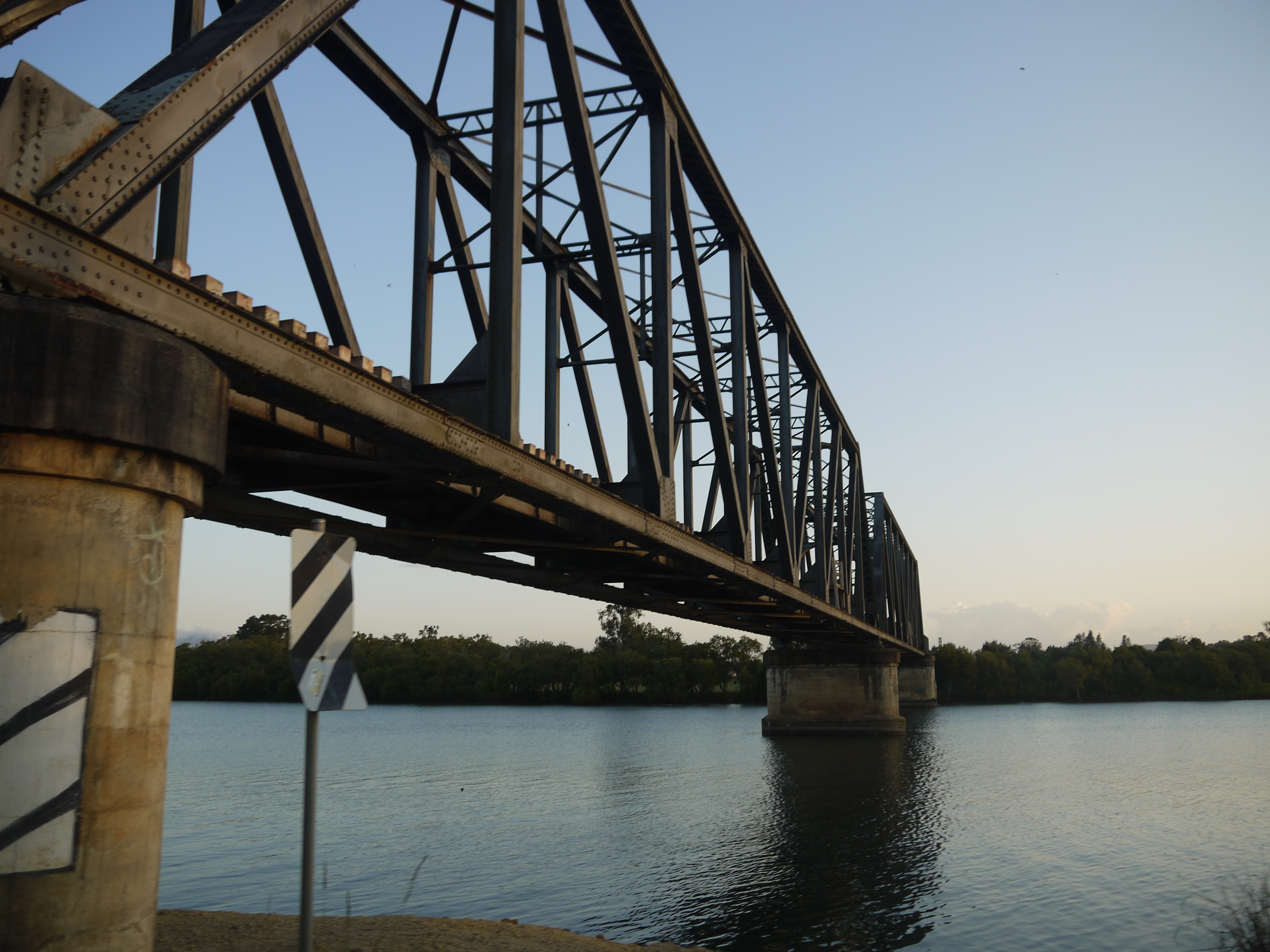
- North Coast Railway Bridge at Macksville

Location
- Country: Australia
- State: New South Wales
- IBRA: NSW North Coast
- District: Mid North Coast
- local government area: Nambucca

Physical characteristics
- Source: Killiekrankie Mountain, Dorrigo Plateau, Great Dividing Range
  - elevation: 594 m (1,949 ft)
- Mouth: Tasman Sea, South Pacific Ocean
  - location: Nambucca Heads
  - elevation: 0 m (0 ft)
- Length: 87 km (54 mi)
- Basin size: 1,299 km^{2} (502 sq mi)

Basin features
- Tributaries
  - left: Missabotti Creek, Newee Creek (New South Wales)
  - right: South Creek (Nambucca), Taylors Arm

The Nambucca River is a river in the Mid North Coast region of New South Wales, Australia.

== Course and features ==
Nambucca River rises below Killiekrankie Mountain on the Dorrigo Plateau, part of the Great Dividing Range, and flows generally east southeast, joined by four tributaries including Taylors Arm, before reaching its mouth at the Tasman Sea of the South Pacific Ocean, at Nambucca Heads. The river descends 594 metres (1,949 ft) over its 87 kilometres (54 mi) course; adjacent to the towns of Bowraville, Macksville and Nambucca Heads.

The Nambucca River area has a fine subtropical climate, high rainfall and fertile volcanic soils. It was originally covered by rainforest, much of which has been cleared, although some rainforests remain in several national parks and reserves. The lowlands along the river are used for farming.

Nambucca River is transversed by the Pacific Highway and the North Coast railway line, near Macksville.

== See also ==
- List of rivers of Australia
- Rivers of New South Wales
