= Bellingen, New South Wales =

Bellingen
- Town
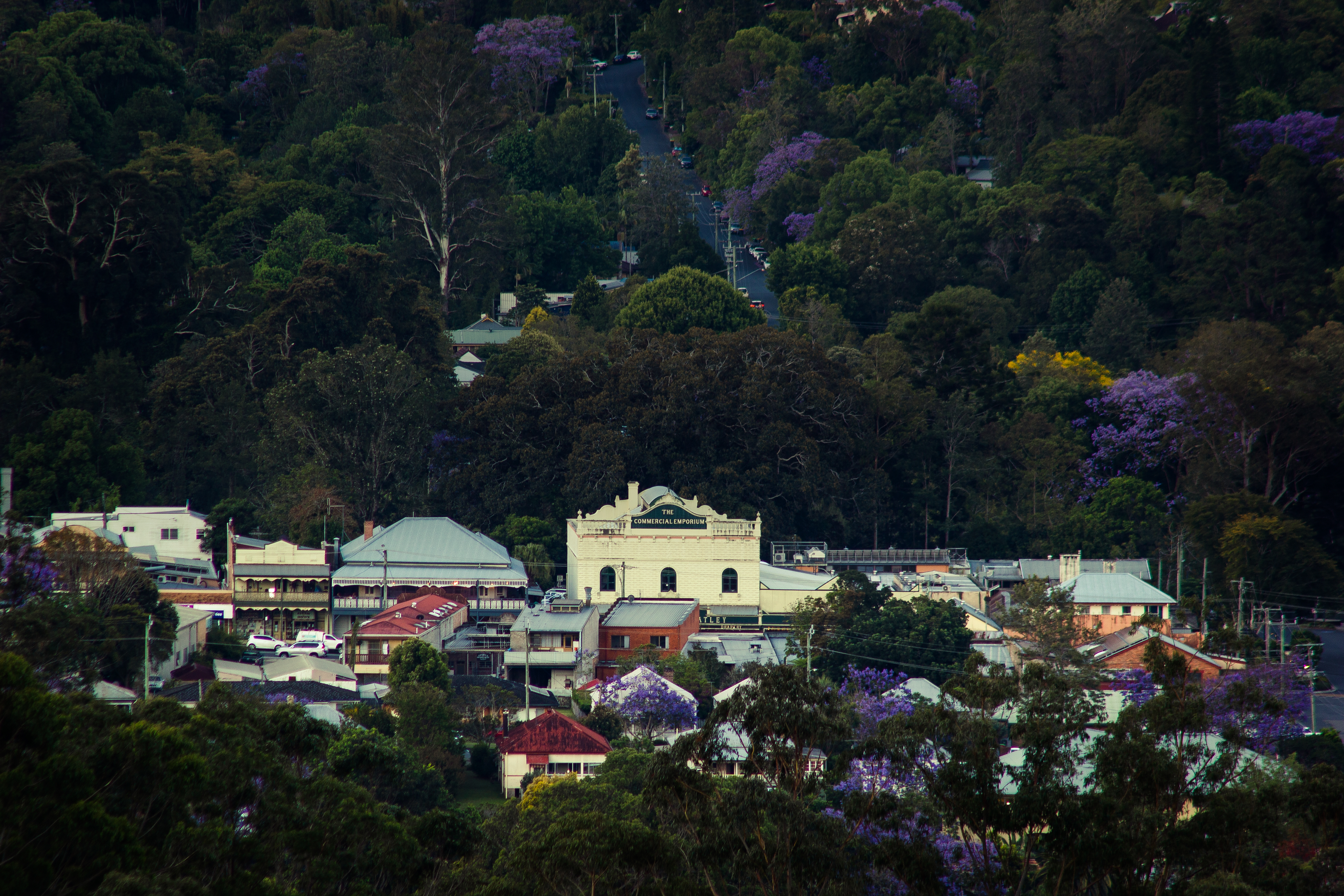
- The view of Bellingen from the south c. 2020

- Coordinates: 30°26′S 152°54′E
- Country: Australia
- State: New South Wales
- LGA: Bellingen Shire
- Location: 547 km (340 mi) from Sydney; 35 km (22 mi) from Coffs Harbour; 29 km (18 mi) from Dorrigo; 156 km (97 mi) from Armidale

Government
  - State electorate: Oxley
  - Federal division: Cowper
- Elevation: 15 m (49 ft)

Population
  - Total: 3,923 (2021 census)
- Postcode: 2454
- County: Raleigh
- Mean max temp: 35.4 °C (95.7 °F)
- Mean min temp: 0.2 °C (32.4 °F)
- Annual rainfall: 1,519.8 mm (59.83 in)

Bellingen (/ˈbɛlɪndʒən/ BEL-in-jen) is a small town in the Mid North Coast of New South Wales, Australia. Located on Waterfall Way on the Bellinger River, it lies approximately halfway between the major Australian cities of Sydney and Brisbane. It is the council seat of Bellingen Shire.

Bellingen is known for its alternative subculture and diverse arts community.

== History ==
The Bellinger Valley was first settled by the Gumbaynggirr people. The first European to come across the Bellinger Valley was the stockman William Myles who arrived in 1840 looking for new valleys north of Kempsey and the Macleay River. The following year, Myles returned accompanied by government surveyor Clement Hodgkinson. Hodgkinson decided to name the area after the word that the Gumbaynggir people in the area used for the river, "Billingen", pronounced like "Billing-en". When it came time to write the word, the Aboriginal voice and the European ear combined to give the spelling of "Bellingen", and over time usage has altered the pronunciation to the current "Bell-in-jen".

At some point, a draughtsman who was compiling the Colony map from original documents misread Hodgkinson's final handwritten "n" as an "r"; meaning that the Bellingen River officially became, and is still the "Bellinger", while the town retained the name of "Bellingen".

Hodgkinson had spoken up about how the area contained a great deal of fine cedar and rosewood, and by 1842 there were cedar cutters at the mouth of the Bellinger River and sheep grazing in the valley. In July 1843 the first cargo of red cedar from the Bellinger Valley was transported to Sydney.

The growth of cedar cutting throughout the 1840s was dramatic, with 20 pit sawers operating along the river by 1843. By 1849, the first timber vessel, the 'Minerva', being built by a shipwright named William Darbyshire. So rich was the area in cedar that it was estimated that over 2 million feet of cedar were being extracted each year.

The Bellinger Valley was progressively settled throughout the 1850s. In 1864, a site was set apart and reserved for the village of Bellingen. In 1869, the Police Station and Court House were built in Bellingen, and the town allotments were surveyed in 1869 and were sold by public auction at West Kempsey Court House on 14 September 1870.

By the early 1900s, red cedar supplies in the Bellinger Valley were virtually depleted. The cleared areas were turned into prime farming land and the valley became a dairying centre. The indigenous population had been decimated by disease and inability to move across the land to locate traditional food supplies, and many were killed in their bid to drive away the cedar getters and new settlers from traditional Gumbaynggir land. 'Black Jimmy' was reported to be the last full-blood member of the Bellinger Gumbaynggir People. Black Jimmy died in 1922 and is buried in Bellingen Cemetery. The Gumbaynggir People still live in the area of Bellingen.

The dairy industry crashed in the 1960s with the rise of the European Common Market, when export prices fell (with Britain no longer relying on Australian dairy products) and the margarine industry finally overcame laws restricting its production levels. Dairy farming still continues to a lesser extent.

Rainforest logging ceased altogether in 1975. Sclerophyll forest logging is still carried out, but to a much lesser extent than in the past.

== Heritage listings ==
Bellingen has a number of heritage-listed sites, including:

- 69–75 Hyde Street: Hammond and Wheatley Commercial Emporium

== Population ==
Historical population
Year	Pop.	±%
1954	1,324	—
1961	1,418	+7.1%
1966	1,390	−2.0%
1971	1,371	−1.4%
1976	1,398	+2.0%
1981	1,593	+13.9%
1986	1,834	+15.1%
1991	2,298	+25.3%
1996	2,690	+17.1%
2001	2,721	+1.2%
2006	2,876	+5.7%
2011	3,038	+5.6%
2016	3,074	+1.2%
2021	3,201	+4.1%
Source: Australian Bureau of Statistics data.

According to the 2021 census of population, there were 3,923 people living in the town of Bellingen.

- 79.4% of people were born in Australia. The next most common country of birth was England at 4.7%.
- 88.8% of people only spoke English at home.
- The most common responses for religion were No Religion 50.8%, Anglican 14.1% and Catholic 11.7%.

According to the 2016 census of population, there were 3,074 people living in the town of Bellingen.

- 78.8% of people were born in Australia. The next most common country of birth was England at 5.2%.
- 89.8% of people only spoke English at home.
- The most common responses for religion were No Religion 46.9%, Catholic 13.1% and Anglican 12.5%.

== Climate ==
Bellingen has a humid subtropical climate (Cfa) with hot, wet summers and mild winters with chilly nights. Owing to high rainfall and its proximity to the valleys of the Bellinger and Kalang rivers, Bellingen is known for its frequent flooding. Tallowood Point near Bellingen often has the State's highest annual rainfall.

Climate data for Bellingen Post Office, New South Wales, Australia (1947–1986 normals, extremes 1957–1986)
Month	Jan	Feb	Mar	Apr	May	Jun	Jul	Aug	Sep	Oct	Nov	Dec	Year
Record high °C (°F)	42.4 (108.3)	41.0 (105.8)	39.5 (103.1)	35.2 (95.4)	31.9 (89.4)	28.3 (82.9)	30.0 (86.0)	32.3 (90.1)	37.1 (98.8)	40.6 (105.1)	45.0 (113.0)	43.6 (110.5)	45.0 (113.0)
Mean daily maximum °C (°F)	29.8 (85.6)	29.4 (84.9)	28.2 (82.8)	25.9 (78.6)	22.7 (72.9)	20.4 (68.7)	20.0 (68.0)	21.7 (71.1)	24.3 (75.7)	26.4 (79.5)	28.4 (83.1)	29.7 (85.5)	25.6 (78.0)
Daily mean °C (°F)	23.6 (74.5)	23.9 (75.0)	22.5 (72.5)	19.6 (67.3)	16.0 (60.8)	13.6 (56.5)	12.4 (54.3)	13.7 (56.7)	16.3 (61.3)	19.1 (66.4)	21.3 (70.3)	23.2 (73.8)	18.8 (65.8)
Mean daily minimum °C (°F)	17.8 (64.0)	18.3 (64.9)	16.8 (62.2)	13.3 (55.9)	9.2 (48.6)	6.8 (44.2)	4.8 (40.6)	5.6 (42.1)	8.3 (46.9)	11.7 (53.1)	14.1 (57.4)	16.6 (61.9)	11.9 (53.5)
Record low °C (°F)	11.1 (52.0)	10.7 (51.3)	8.3 (46.9)	3.8 (38.8)	−0.6 (30.9)	−1.7 (28.9)	−3.7 (25.3)	−3.3 (26.1)	−1.7 (28.9)	0.6 (33.1)	5.0 (41.0)	7.2 (45.0)	−3.7 (25.3)
Average precipitation mm (inches)	183.5 (7.22)	196.4 (7.73)	218.3 (8.59)	153.7 (6.05)	119.9 (4.72)	108.6 (4.28)	79.9 (3.15)	57.5 (2.26)	57.1 (2.25)	95.9 (3.78)	111.4 (4.39)	137.6 (5.42)	1,519.8 (59.84)
Average precipitation days (≥ 1.0 mm)	10.4	10.6	11.8	8.4	7.4	5.9	4.5	4.7	5.1	6.9	8.2	9.0	92.9
Average relative humidity (%)	67	69	71	68	61	63	58	54	56	59	60	64	63
Mean daily daylight hours	13.9	13.2	12.3	11.4	10.6	10.2	10.4	11.0	11.9	12.8	13.7	14.1	12.1
Source: Bureau of Meteorology

== Culture ==
Bellingen is home to numerous festivals: the Global Carnival, the Bellingen Jazz and Blues Festival, Camp Creative, the Bellingen Music Festival, Bello Winter Music Festival, and the Bellingen Readers and Writers Festival, held for the first time in 2011. The first one was the annual Azalea Festival, which included a procession of floats, the local brass band and pipe band, and various community organisations marching down Hyde Street to the cheers and applause of the spectators.

Some events of the Screenwave International Film Festival (2015–2023), based in Coffs Harbour, took place in Bellingen.

Bellingen was the notional setting of the Booker Prize-winning book Oscar and Lucinda by Peter Carey. It was one of the filming locations for the 2003 comedy film Danny Deckchair, written and directed by Jeff Balsmeyer. It was chosen as the location for filming an adaptation of Murray Bail's novel Eucalyptus, and a set costing $6.4 million was constructed. However, due to differences between director Jocelyn Moorhouse and actor Russell Crowe, filming never commenced.

Bellingen also hosts the twice yearly Plant Fairs as a fundraiser for the Bellingen Environment Centre. These fairs attract thousands of visitors to the town. The 70+ stall-holders provide information and sell bushland-friendly Australian native, food-bearing and landscape plants and heirloom seeds, garden equipment, furniture and supplies to provide local food, and habitat for native birds and animals.

The Bellingen Community Market is held monthly and has been running for over 40 years. Live music is provided with more than 200 stalls operating.

== Schools ==
- Bellingen Public School
- St Mary's Primary School
- Chrysalis School for Rudolph Steiner Education
- Bellingen High School

== Notable residents ==
- Saskia Burmeister – actress
- Mike Cockerill – Australian Football journalist
- Bruce Cowan – politician
- Ben Cropp – ocean adventurer, shipwreck hound, marine conservationist, and filmmaker
- Keith Froome – Australian national Rugby League Test captain
- Adam Gilchrist – Australian test cricketer/sportscaster
- Jimmy Hannan – Australian radio and television personality
- David Helfgott – Australian concert pianist
- Sarah Kemp - Australian actress
- Matthew Locke – Sergeant of the Special Air Service Regiment, and Medal for Gallantry recipient
- Oliver McGill – Australian musician, keyboard player and backing vocalist for The Cat Empire.
- George Negus – Australian author, journalist, and television presenter, and host of Dateline
- Gordon Parsons – country music singer-songwriter, best known as the composer of Slim Dusty's 1957 hit song A Pub With No Beer
- John Vallins – musician and composer best known for the band Tin Tin
- Colin Thompson – author and illustrator
- John Warwick – actor and dramatist
- Ziggy Ramo – singer
