= Mylestom, New South Wales =

Mylestom New South Wales
- Coordinates: 30°27′S 153°03′E
- Population: 336 (2021 census)
- Postcode(s): 2454
- Location: 678 km (421 mi) NE of Sydney; 29 km (18 mi) S of Coffs Harbour; 12 km (7 mi) NE of Urunga
- LGA(s): Bellingen Shire Council
- State electorate(s): Oxley
- Federal division(s): Cowper

Mylestom is a small town in New South Wales, Australia, located on the coast near the mouth of the Bellinger River. At the 2021 census, Mylestom (North Beach) had a population of 336.

It has a surf lifesaving club, a caravan park, a hotel, and shops.

On the second weekend of January each year there is the Annual Putt Bennett Fishing Festival. The town has over 9 kilometres of pristine beach with the Bellinger River, two boat ramps, swimming in Riverside Tidal Pool, the Alma Doepel Park Children's Playground. There is a disabled access pathway from the beach down past Alama Doepel Park, right along the picturesque Bellinger River, crossing over at Christian Parade and with access to the BMX track and skatepark. The pathway continues on down to the Recreation and Bowling Club.

Historical population
Year	Pop.	±%
1976	265	—
1981	388	+46.4%
1986	428	+10.3%
1991	436	+1.9%
1996	384	−11.9%
2001	379	−1.3%
2006	338	−10.8%
2011	339	+0.3%
2016	344	+1.5%
2021	336	−2.3%
Source: Australian Bureau of Statistics data.
