= Dunggir National Park =

National park in New South Wales, Australia

- IUCN category II (national park)
- Location within New South Wales
- Location: New South Wales
- Coordinates: 30°40′36″S 152°39′07″E
- Area: 25 km^{2} (9.7 sq mi)
- Established: 1997
- Governing body: NSW National Parks & Wildlife Service

Dunggir is a national park located in New South Wales, Australia, 382 kilometres (237 mi) northeast of Sydney. It features the Kosekai Lookout, offering a view of the Nambucca Valley. Dungir (Gumbaynggirr) means "koala".

The park is home to twelve endangered animal species, 400 indigenous plants and three types of rainforest.

== See also ==
- Protected areas of New South Wales
