= Congarinni, New South Wales =

Locality in New South Wales, Australia

Coordinates: 30.754°S 152.877°E

Congarinni is located in the Mid North Coast of New South Wales, Australia.

Congarinni is also split up primarily into Congarinni North and Congarinni. The closest main town is Macksville.

The suburb and its surroundings are primarily rural farming areas.
