= Bonville, New South Wales =

Town in New South Wales, Australia

Coordinates: 30°23′S 153°03′E

Bonville is a small town located on the Mid North Coast of New South Wales, Australia, 11 kilometres south of Coffs Harbour and in the local government area of City of Coffs Harbour. It has a population of 1,891 as of 2006. The town's name supposedly derives from "Bongol Bongol/Bongil Bongil", which in Gumbaingirr, means a place where one stays a long time.

The town is known for Bonville International Golf Course. It has a Christian high school and two public primary schools. The town has now been bypassed by the Pacific Highway A railway station on the North Coast line was open between 1915 and 1974, it was subsequently demolished and no trace remains.

Preceding station	Former services	Following station
Sawtell towards Brisbane	North Coast Line	Archville towards Maitland
