= Missabotti, New South Wales =

Suburb in Australia

Missabotti
- Town
- Coordinates: 30°34′03″S 152°48′20″E
- Country: Australia
- State: New South Wales
- LGA: Nambucca Shire

Government
  - State electorate: Oxley
  - Federal division: Cowper

Population
  - Total: 246 (SAL 2021)
- Postcode: 2449

Missabotti is a small valley located in the Mid North Coast Region of New South Wales.
