= Raleigh County, New South Wales =

Raleigh New South Wales
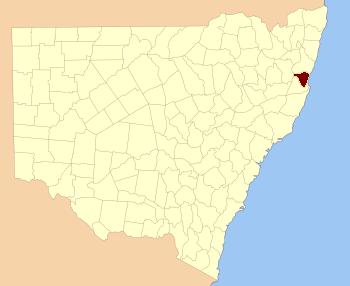
- Location in New South Wales
Lands administrative divisions around Raleigh:
| Fitzroy | Fitzroy | Pacific Ocean |
| Clarke | Raleigh | Pacific Ocean |
| Dudley | Dudley | Pacific Ocean |

Raleigh County is one of the 141 cadastral divisions of New South Wales, Australia. It includes Nambucca Heads and lies south of the Bellinger River.

The origin of the name "Raleigh County" is unknown.

== Parishes within this county ==
A full list of parishes found within this county, their current local government area (LGA) and mapping co-ordinates to the approximate centre of each location is as follows:

| Parish | LGA | Co-ordinates |
|---|---|---|
| Allgomera | Nambucca Shire Council | 30°45′54″S 152°50′04″E |
| Belmore | Bellingen Shire Council | 30°28′54″S 152°46′04″E |
| Bonville | City of Coffs Harbour | 30°22′54″S 153°00′04″E |
| Bowra | Nambucca Shire Council | 30°40′54″S 152°52′04″E |
| Buckra Bendinni | Nambucca Shire Council | 30°36′54″S 152°46′04″E |
| Congarinni | Nambucca Shire Council | 30°43′54″S 152°54′04″E |
| Denison | Nambucca Shire Council | 30°46′54″S 152°44′04″E |
| Dingle | Bellingen Shire Council | 30°24′54″S 152°35′04″E |
| Dudley | Bellingen Shire Council | 30°29′54″S 152°41′04″E |
| Gladstone | Bellingen Shire Council | 30°29′54″S 152°50′04″E |
| Herborn | Nambucca Shire Council | 30°38′54″S 152°38′04″E |
| Ingalba | Nambucca Shire Council | 30°49′54″S 152°43′04″E |
| Ketelghay | Nambucca Shire Council | 30°39′31″S 152°44′56″E |
| Medlow | Nambucca Shire Council | 30°45′54″S 152°39′04″E |
| Merrylegai | Nambucca Shire Council | 30°33′54″S 152°41′04″E |
| Missabotti | Nambucca Shire Council | 30°34′54″S 152°50′04″E |
| Nambucca | Nambucca Shire Council | 30°38′54″S 152°56′04″E |
| Never Never | Bellingen Shire Council | 30°21′54″S 152°50′04″E |
| Newry | Bellingen Shire Council | 30°29′54″S 153°00′04″E |
| North Bellingen | Bellingen Shire Council | 30°24′54″S 152°57′04″E |
| North Creek | Nambucca Shire Council | 30°37′24″S 152°35′04″E |
| Oakes | Bellingen Shire Council | 30°29′54″S 152°34′04″E |
| Raleigh | Nambucca Shire Council | 30°32′54″S 152°31′04″E |
| South Bellingen | Bellingen Shire Council | 30°29′54″S 152°57′04″E |
| Timboon | Bellingen Shire Council | 30°21′54″S 152°56′04″E |
| Unkya | Nambucca Shire Council | 30°51′54″S 152°50′04″E |
| Valley Valley | Nambucca Shire Council | 30°35′54″S 152°58′04″E |
| Vautin | Bellingen Shire Council | 30°23′54″S 152°43′04″E |
| Warrell | Nambucca Shire Council | 30°47′54″S 152°56′04″E |
| Waverley | Bellingen Shire Council | 30°27′54″S 152°28′04″E |
| Yarranbella | Nambucca Shire Council | 30°44′54″S 152°43′04″E |
