= Archville, New South Wales =

Coordinates: 30°23′55″S 153°03′04″E

Archville New South Wales
- Postcode(s): 2450
- LGA(s): City of Coffs Harbour

Archville is a locality of Bonville in the Mid North Coast region of New South Wales, Australia. A railway station on the North Coast line opened in 1936, but was subsequently closed in 1974 and demolished. No trace remains. It is remembered by 'Archville Station Road', the main road. Pine Creek serves as the southern boundary.

Preceding station	Former services	Following station
Bonville towards Brisbane	North Coast Line	Repton towards Maitland
