= The Coffs Coast Advocate =

- Type: Newspaper
- Format: Tabloid
- Owner: News Corp Australia
- Founded: 1907
- Language: English
- Headquarters: Coffs Harbour, New South Wales, Australia; P.O. Box 534; Coffs Harbour NSW 2450
- Circulation: 62,000 Wednesday and Saturday
- Price: A$1.0 Mon, Tues, Thur, Fri; A$0.00 Wed, Sat
- Website: coffscoastadvocate.com.au

The Coffs Coast Advocate is a bi-weekly newspaper serving Coffs Harbour in New South Wales, Australia. The newspaper is owned by News Corp Australia.

The Coffs Coast Advocate is circulated to the Coffs Harbour surrounds from Macksville in the south, west to Dorrigo and as far north as Halfway Creek.

The circulation of The Coffs Coast Advocate is 62,000 Wednesday and Saturday (publisher's claim) and 31,179 on Wednesday and Saturday.

The Coffs Coast Advocate website is part of News Corp Australia's News Regional Media network.

== See also ==
- List of newspapers in Australia
