= Taylors Arm, New South Wales =

Taylors Arm
- Town
- Coordinates: 30°45′S 152°53′E
- Country: Australia
- State: New South Wales
- LGA: Nambucca Valley Council

Government
  - State electorate: Oxley
  - Federal division: Cowper
- Elevation: 24.8 m (81 ft)

Population
  - Total: 133 (2021 census)
- Postcode: 2447
- County: Raleigh

Taylors Arm is a village in the Nambucca Valley in New South Wales, Australia.

== History ==
When its main industries of cedar felling and dairying were at their peak the small village of Taylors Arm was thriving. It had a boarding house built around 1890, then five years later the pub was built. Taylors Arm Post Office opened on 1 August 1891. Other stores were built including a bakery, butchery and a grocery store. There were apparently seven schools from Thumb Creek to Macksville. Medlow Primary School at Upper Taylors Arm now has approximately 30 students.

=== Pub with No Beer ===
Gordon Parsons (Australian country music singer) is believed to have written the song "The Pub With No Beer" based on the original poem "The Pub Without Beer" written by Dan Sheahan of Ingham, North Queensland.

In 1943 Sheahan was a local cane farmer and rode 20 miles to his local pub in Ingham, the Day Dawn Hotel owned by the Harvey family. When Sheahan arrived Gladys Harvey told him that the American troops stationed near Ingham during the war had drunk the entire month's allocation of beer - beer being rationed during WW2. Sheahan rode home dry and wrote the poem. The original Day Dawn Hotel in Ingham was partially demolished and was replaced by Lees Hotel which still stands to this day.

The original poem by Sheahan was published in Ben Bowyangs column in the NQ Register in 1944.

In 1956, Gordon Parsons was performing his version of the song at the Taylors Arm Hotel when Slim Dusty asked if he could record it. Parsons passed the song on to Slim Dusty who needed a song for a B side of his record Saddle Boy.

== Environment ==
Taylors Arm and surrounding area has an undulating landscape, State Forest, National Parks and Thumb Creek to Taylors Arm river, that consists of some very inviting water holes in the hot summer. On entry into the quiet village, an avenue of Paulownia trees is set in the foreground with blue mountains in the background.

Camping is available on the Reserve for a small fee. There are tennis courts, cricket pitch and barbecue facilities.

The main industry today is beef cattle, dairy cattle, organic crops, cedar wood works, lemon myrtle, and smaller cottage industries.
