= Bellinger River =

River in New South Wales, Australia

Coordinates: 30°30′S 153°02′E

Bellinger River North Arm Bellingen River, North Arm Bellinger River
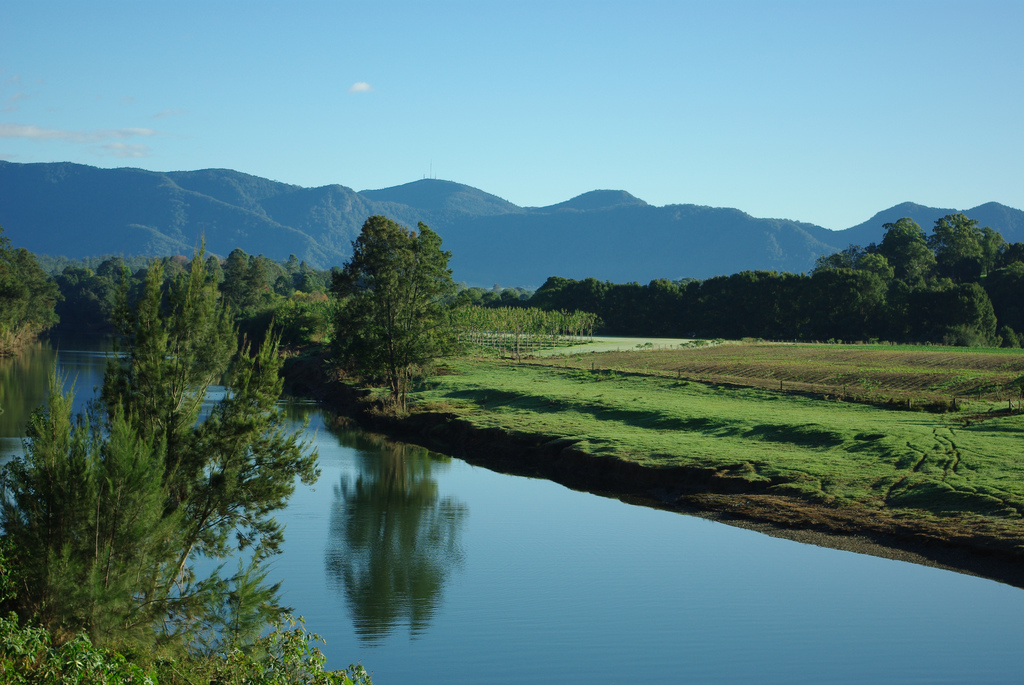
- 2009

- Location within Australia

Location
- Country: Australia
- State: New South Wales
- IBRA: NSW North Coast
- District: Mid North Coast
- Local government area: Bellingen

Physical characteristics
- Source: Great Dividing Range
  - location: below Point Lookout, near Ebor
  - elevation: 1,150 m (3,770 ft)
- Mouth: Tasman Sea, South Pacific Ocean
  - location: east of Urunga
  - elevation: 0 m (0 ft)
- Length: 109 km (68 mi)
- Basin size: 1,100 km^{2} (420 sq mi)

Basin features
- Tributaries
  - left: Hydes Creek, Woods Creek (New South Wales), Never Never River
  - right: Boggy Creek
- National parks: New England NP, Bellinger River NP

Bellinger River, an open and trained mature wave dominated, barrier estuary, is located in the Mid North Coast region of New South Wales, Australia.

== Course and features ==
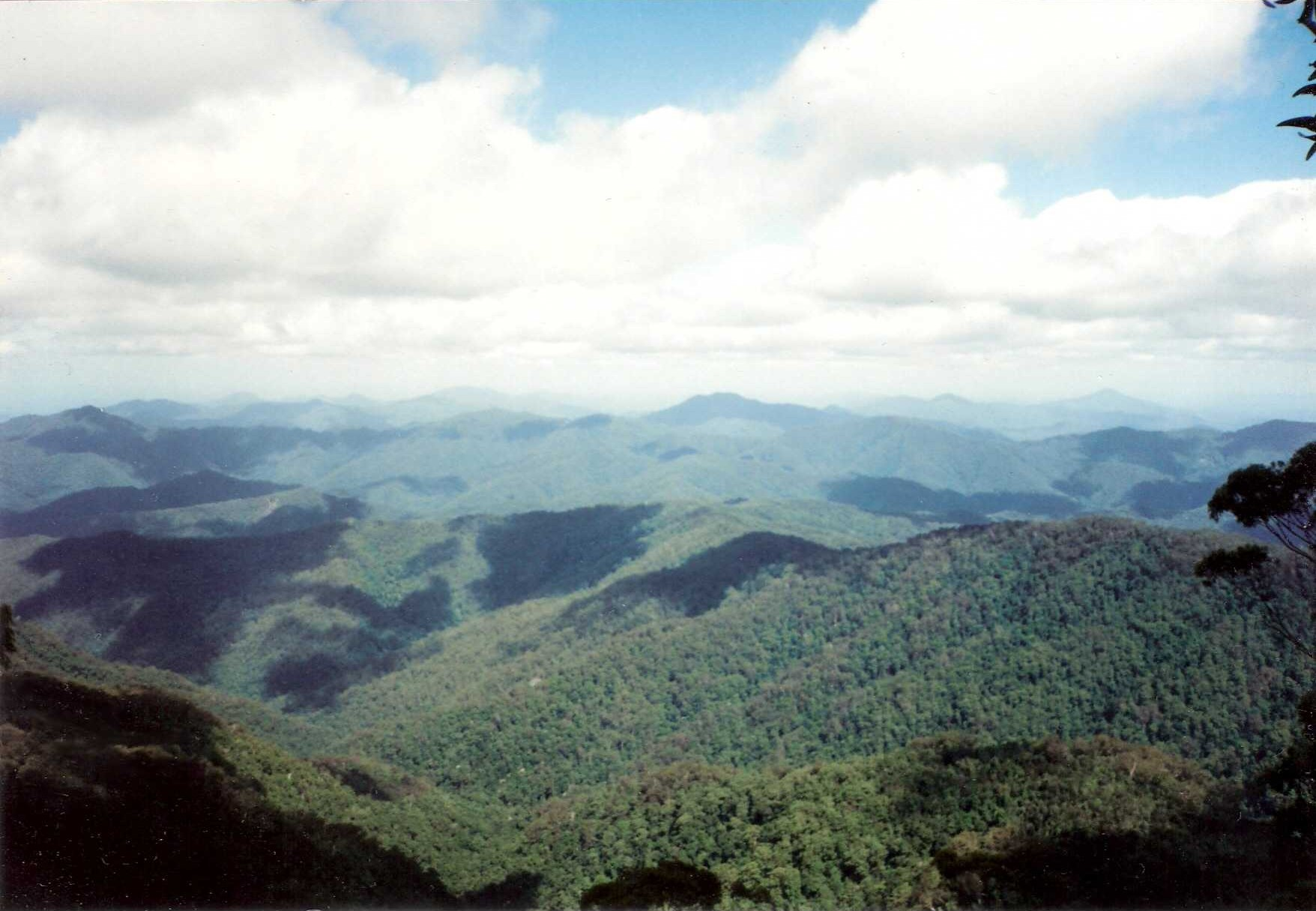
The Bellinger River is home to the rare freshwater snapping turtle the, Bellinger River is the only place they are found on Earth. Bellinger River Valley, as seen from Point Lookout, 1995

Bellinger River rises below Point Lookout within the Great Dividing Range, southeast of Ebor, and flows in a meandering course generally east, joined by four tributaries including Never Never River, before reaching its mouth at the Tasman Sea of the South Pacific Ocean, east of Urunga. The river descends 1,150 metres (3,770 ft) over its 69 kilometres (43 mi) course.

Parts of the Bellinger River are contained within the Bellinger River National Park and the New England National Park. Other land uses in the valley include livestock grazing and forestry.

Waterfall Way is located adjacent to the middle reaches of the Bellinger River; and towards its mouth, the river is transversed by the Pacific Highway, near Raleigh.

A rare Australian turtle, the Bellinger River snapping turtle (Myuchelys georgesi), has a restricted distribution in the upper Bellinger River above Thora.

== History ==
Clement Hodgkinson was the first European to explore the area in March 1841.

== See also ==
- Rivers of New South Wales
- List of rivers of Australia
