= Nambucca Heads =

- Town
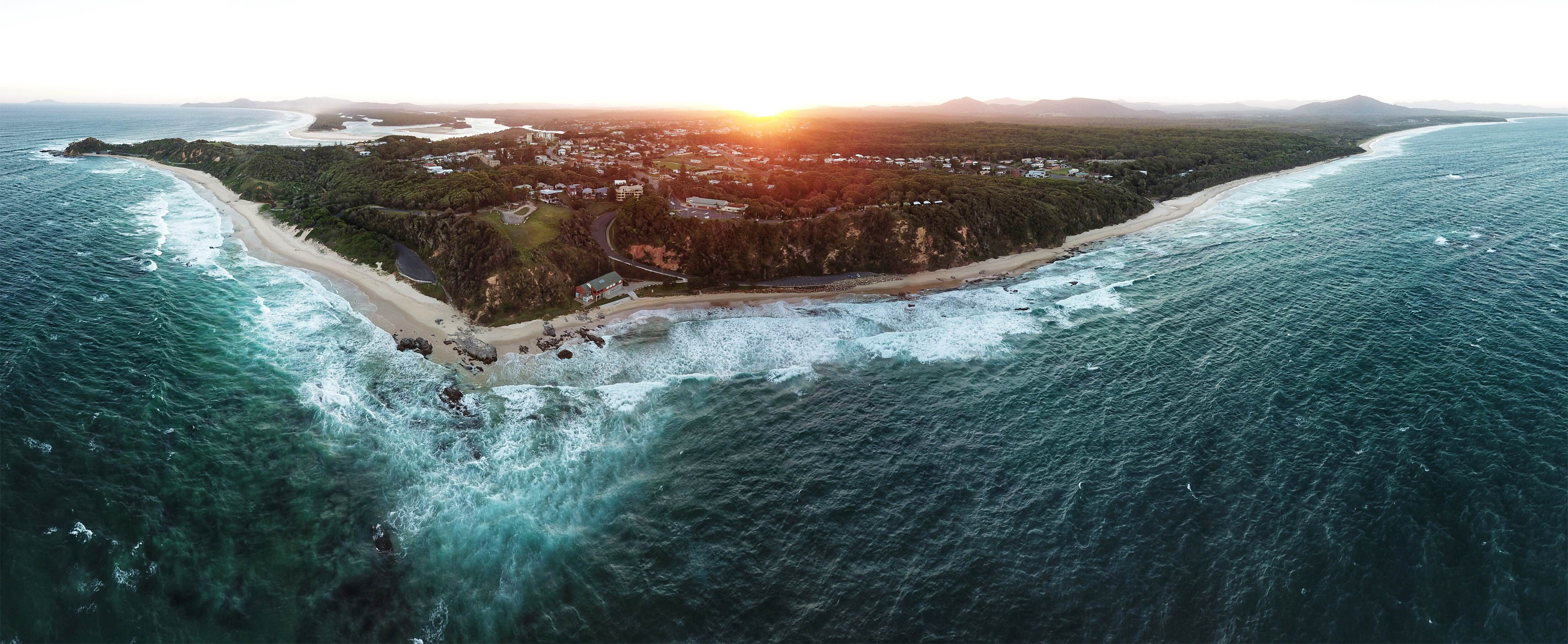
- Nambucca Heads aerial panorama at sunset

- Coordinates: 30°39′0″S 153°00′0″E
- Country: Australia
- State: New South Wales
- LGA: Nambucca Valley Council
- Location: 493 km (306 mi) N of Sydney; 431 km (268 mi) S of Brisbane; 13 km (8.1 mi) NE of Macksville; 47 km (29 mi) SSW of Coffs Harbour; 64 km (40 mi) NE of Kempsey

Government
  - State electorate: Oxley
  - Federal division: Cowper

Area
  - Total: 31.39 km^{2} (12.12 sq mi)
- Elevation: 26 m (85 ft)

Population
  - Total: 6,668 (UCL 2021)
  - Density: 227.8/km^{2} (590/sq mi)
- Postcode: 2448
- County: Raleigh

Nambucca Heads is a town on the Mid North Coast of New South Wales, Australia in the Nambucca Valley. It is located on a ridge, north of the estuary of the Nambucca River near the Pacific Highway. Its population at the 2021 census was 6,668 (6,314 in the 2016 census and 6,220 in the 2011 census), including 5,220 (78.3%) Australian–born persons; followed by 262 (3.9%) English people, 86 (1.3%) New Zealand people, 36 (0.5%) Scottish people, 33 (0.5%) German people, and 32 (0.5%) Filipino people. and 672 (10.1%) indigenous persons.

The place name is derived from an Gumbaynggirr word Ngambagabaga. Clement Hodgkinson asked two Ngamba men what the name of the area was they responded to Nyambagabaga as the spot they were standing was a bend in the river where a Ngamba giant was speared in the leg in the Dreaming. This location is the Foreshore Caravan Park now. Ngamba is a subsection of Gumbaynggirr Nation & Baga Baga means Knee. This was later interpreted as Nambucca. It is a popular holiday and retirement destination.

The town is located on the North Coast railway line, and is served by the three daily NSW TrainLink services.

== History ==
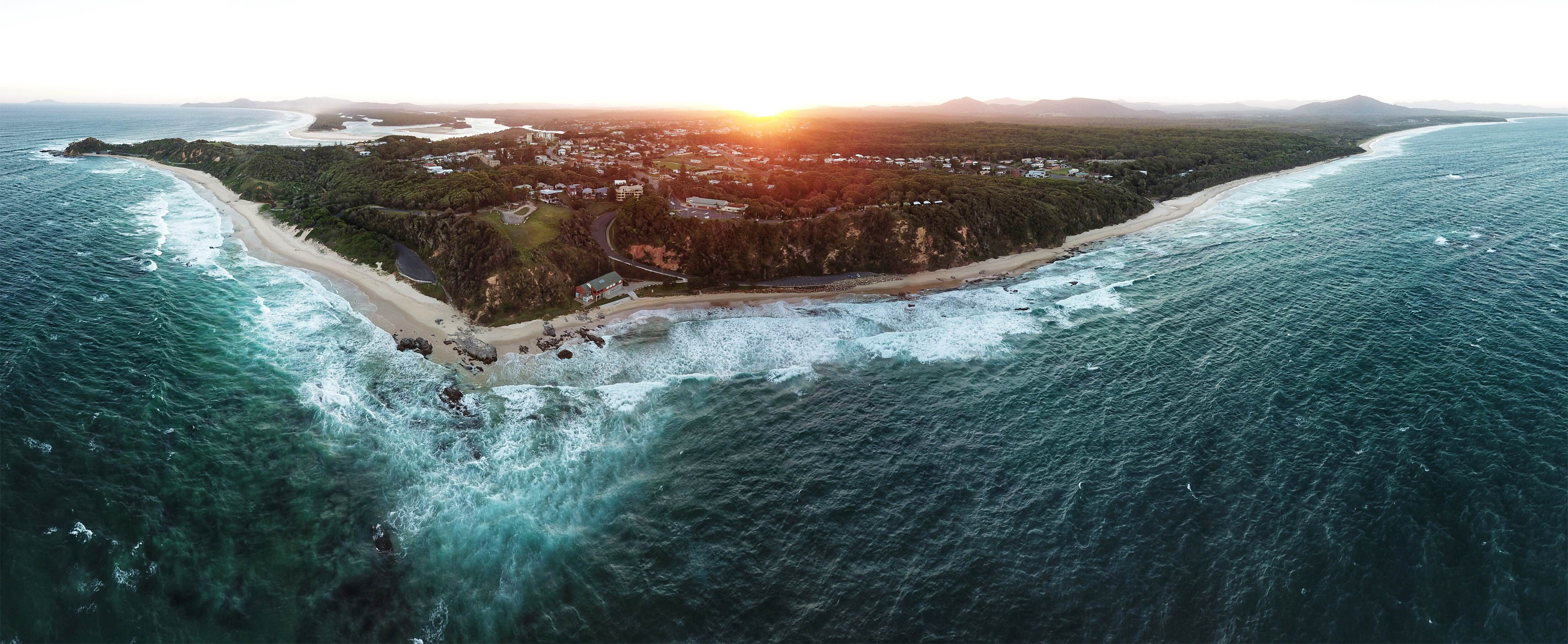
Nambucca Heads aerial panorama – sunset in 2018

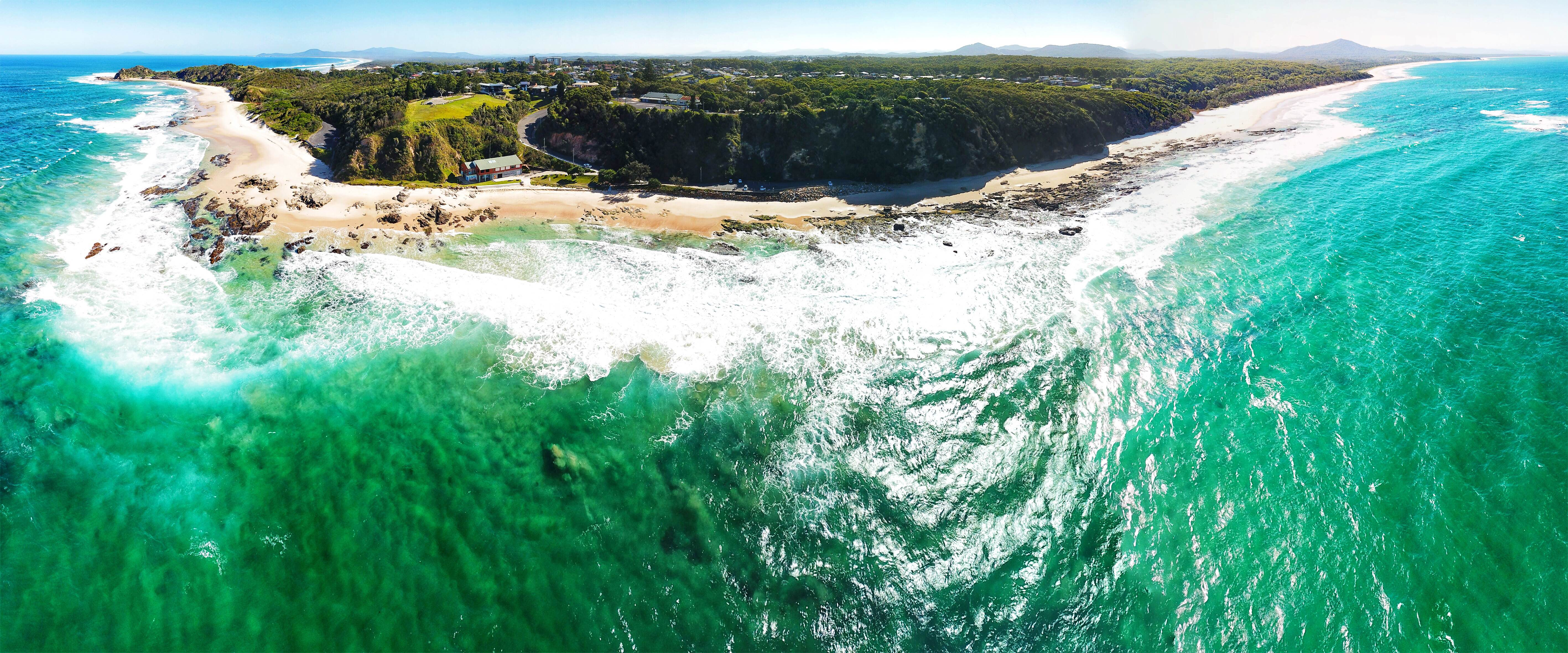
Nambucca Heads panoramic perspective

Nambucca Heads is the current and historical homeland of the Gumbaynggirr people. Gumbaynggirr lands stretch from Pillar Valley, Tyndale, Grafton and Copmanhurst in the north, to Glen Innes, Guyra and Black Mountain to the west, and to Bowraville to the south. The Nambucca River separated the Gumbaynggirr from the Dunghutti Ngaku. The name Nambucca comes from an Aboriginal word, ngambugka, variously translated as "winding or crooked river", and as "entrance to the waters."

Europeans may have explored the area in 1818, and John Oxley surveyed the area in 1820.

The cutting of Australian red cedar had started in the area by 1842. It is believed that the first house was built in 1867, when about 50 people had settled in the valley to cut cedar or grow corn. The site of the town was surveyed in 1874 and the first hotel and school were both established in 1884. It was proclaimed a village in 1885. The North Coast railway was extended from Taree to South Grafton in 1915, but Nambucca Heads station was not opened until 1923.

Nambucca Heads has one of the oldest surf lifesaving clubs in Australia and also invented junior surf lifesaving known as Nippers.

In December 1980 the five kilometre Belwood Deviation of the Pacific Highway opened bypassing Nambucca Heads.

Historical population
Year	Pop.	±%
1954	1,998	—
1961	2,252	+12.7%
1966	2,385	+5.9%
1971	2,708	+13.5%
1976	3,217	+18.8%
1981	4,053	+26.0%
1986	4,923	+21.5%
1991	5,683	+15.4%
1996	6,253	+10.0%
2001	6,121	−2.1%
2006	5,873	−4.1%
2011	6,220	+5.9%
2016	6,314	+1.5%
2021	6,668	+5.6%
Source: Australian Bureau of Statistics data.

== Local media ==
Radio Stations: 2CS-FM (106.3), Star FM (105.5 & 105.1), 2MC-FM (106.7), Triple J (91.5 & 96.3), 2NVR FM (105.9)

The Nambucca Valley's community radio station, 2NVR 105.9FM, focuses on Macksville, Bowraville, Nambucca Heads and surrounding communities.

Newspapers: Midcoast Observer, Hibiscus Happynings, Guardian News, Coffs Coast Advocate.

Television: ABC, SBS, Seven Network, Network 10, Nine (NBN)

== Schools ==
- Nambucca Heads Public School
- Frank Partridge VC Public School
- Nambucca Valley Christian Community School
- Nambucca Heads High School

== Transport ==
Nambucca Heads railway station, opened in 1923, on the North Coast Line. It is serviced by three NSW TrainLink trains per day in each direction.

== Notable Residents ==
- Aretha Brown, First Nations youth activist
- Frank Partridge VC, Australia's youngest recipient of the Victoria Cross
- Geoff Huegill, former competitive butterfly swimmer
- Belinda Emmett, Australian singer and actress
- Peter Cundall, television presenter
- Rod McRae, former New South Wales Rugby League (NSWRL) player
- Max Boyd, Australian contemporary ceramics artist
- Gary Edward Foley, First Nations activist
- Aden Ridgeway, former Australian Senator
