= Nambucca Valley Council =

- Local government area
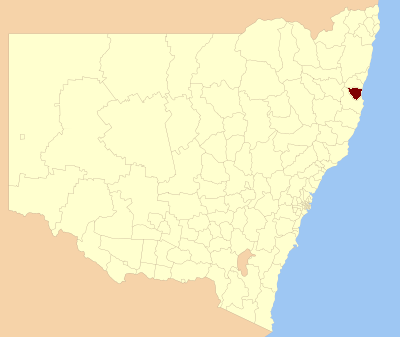
- Location in New South Wales

- Interactive map of Nambucca Valley Council
- Coordinates: 30°43′S 152°55′E
- Country: Australia
- State: New South Wales
- Region: Mid North Coast
- Established: 15 December 1915
- Council seat: Macksville

Government
  - Mayor: Gary Lee (Independent)
  - State electorate: Oxley
  - Federal division: Cowper

Area
  - Total: 1,491 km^{2} (576 sq mi)

Population
  - Total: 20,407 (2021 census)
  - Density: 13.687/km^{2} (35.449/sq mi)
- Website: Nambucca Valley Council
LGAs around Nambucca Valley Council
Armidale	Bellingen	Tasman Sea
Armidale	Nambucca Valley Council	Tasman Sea
Kempsey	Kempsey	Tasman Sea

Nambucca Valley Council is a local government area in the Mid North Coast region of New South Wales, Australia.

The shire services an area of 1,491 square kilometres (576 sq mi) and is located adjacent to the Pacific Highway and the North Coast railway line. At the 2016 census, Nambucca Valley Council had a high proportion of Aboriginal and Torres Strait Islander people residing within its boundaries; being 7.6 per cent of the population, nearly treble the national and state averages of 2.8 and 2.9 per cent respectively. Within the Shire's boundaries is Bowraville, one of the most socially disadvantaged areas in Australia.

The mayor of the Nambucca Valley Council is Gary Lee, an independent politician.

The local government area was created on 15 December 1915, from land excised from Bellingen Shire, and was originally called Nambucca Shire. The area was renamed Nambucca Valley from 4 December 2019.

== Towns and localities ==
Towns and localities in the Nambucca Valley Council area:

- Allgomerra
- Bowraville
- Burrapine
- Congarinni
- Eungai Creek
- Eungai Rail
- Gumma
- Hyland Park
- Macksville
- Medlow
- Missabotti
- Nambucca Heads
- Newee Creek
- Scotts Head
- Talarm
- Tamban
- Taylors Arm
- Tewinga
- Thumb Creek
- Utungun
- Valla
- Valla Beach
- Warrell Creek
- Wirrimbi
- Yarranbella

== Heritage listings ==
The Nambucca Valley has a number of heritage-listed sites, including:

- Macksville, North Coast railway: Macksville railway station

== Demographics ==
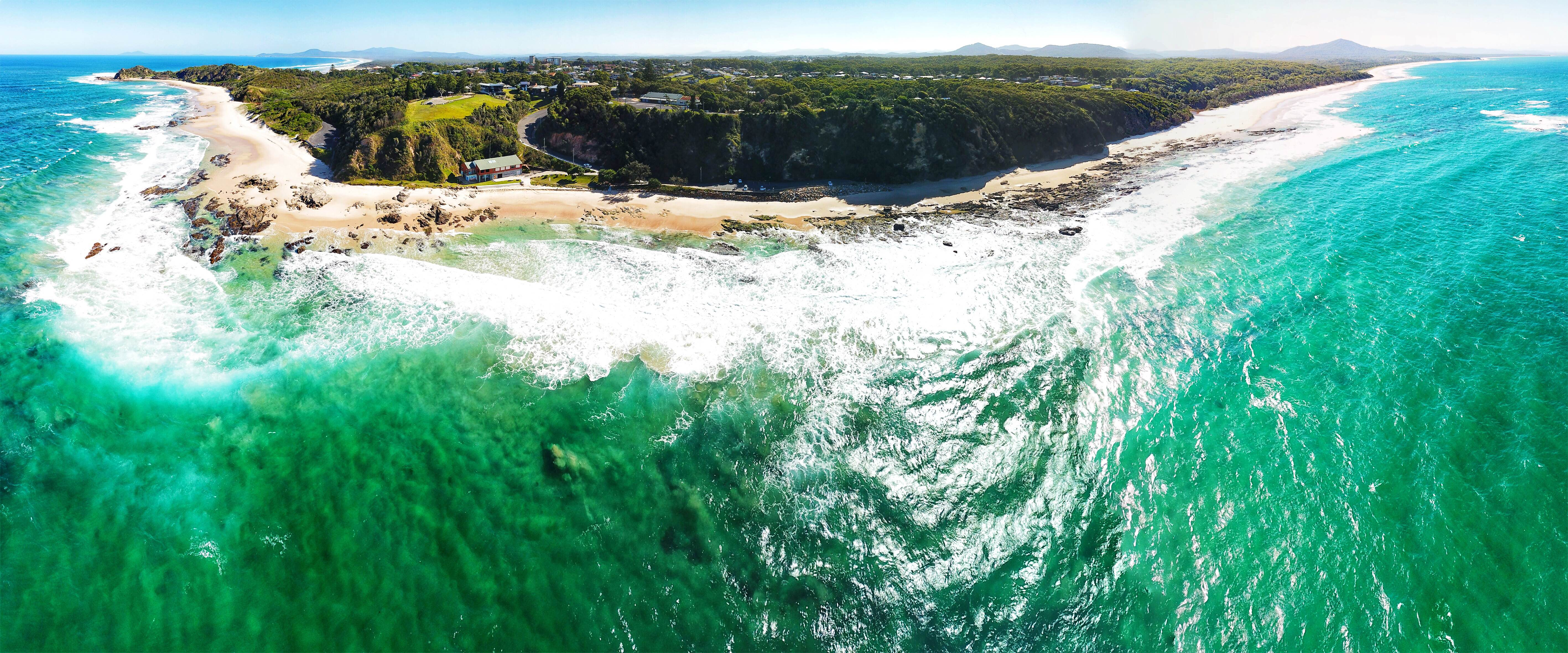
Nambucca Heads aerial panorama

At the 2021 census, there were 20,407 people in the Nambucca Valley local government area, of these 48.7 per cent were male and 51.3 per cent were female. Aboriginal and Torres Strait Islander people made up 8.0 per cent of the population, which was greater than the national and state averages of 3.2 and 3.4 per cent respectively. The median age of people in the Nambucca Valley Council was 52 years, some fourteen years higher than the national median. Children aged 0 – 14 years made up 15.7 per cent of the population and people aged 65 years and over made up 30.0 per cent of the population. Of people in the area aged 15 years and over, 42.4 per cent were married and 17.6 per cent were either divorced or separated.

The median weekly income for residents within the Nambucca Valley Council was significantly below the national average with $976 household income compared to $1,746 nationally, being one of the factors that place parts of the Nambucca Valley Council in an area of social disadvantage.

At the 2021 Census, the proportion of residents in the Nambucca Valley Council local government area who stated their ancestry as Australian or Anglo-Saxon was 84.2 per cent of all residents (the national average was 62.9 per cent). About 40.4 per cent of all residents in the Nambucca Valley Council identified with No Religion, so described at the 2021 census, which was slightly higher than the national average of 38.4 per cent. Meanwhile, as at the 2021 census date, compared to the national average, households in the Nambucca Valley Council local government area had a significantly lower than average proportion of residents that 4.3 per cent spoke two or more languages at home (the national average was 24.8 per cent); and a significantly higher proportion of residents 89.0 per cent where English only was spoken at home (the national average was 72.0 per cent). Of the other languages, 0.3% of residents stated they speak Punjabi, 0.2% of residents stated they speak German, 0.2% stated they speak Nepali, 0.2% of residents stated that they speak Gumbaynggir, an Australian Aboriginal language, and 0.2% of residents stated they speak French.

Selected historical census data for Nambucca local government area
Census year		2001	2006	2011	2016	2021
Population	Estimated residents on census night	17,660	▲17,897	▲18,644	▲19,212	▲20,407
Population	LGA rank in terms of size within New South Wales			71st		
Population	% of New South Wales population	–	–	0.27%	▼0.26%	▼0.25%
Population	% of Australian population	0.09%	0.09%	0.09%	▼0.08	0.08%
Cultural and language diversity						
Ancestry, top responses	Australian	–	–	33.4%	▼33.2%	▲41.0%
Ancestry, top responses	English	–	–	32.6%	▼31.9%	▲43.2%
Ancestry, top responses	Irish	–	–	8.7%	▼8.6%	▲11.6%
Ancestry, top responses	Scottish	–	–	7.9%	▼7.8%	▲11.2%
Ancestry, top responses	German	–	–	3.0%	▼2.9%	–
Ancestry, top responses	Australian Aboriginal	–	–	–	–	7.4%
Language, top responses (other than English)	German	0.3%	0.3%	▼0.2%	▼0.1%	▲0.2%
Language, top responses (other than English)	Gumbaynggir	–	0.1%	▲0.2%	▼0.1%	▲0.2%
Language, top responses (other than English)	French	0.1%	0.1%	▲0.2%	0.2%	0.2%
Language, top responses (other than English)	Dutch	–	0.1%	▲0.2%	–	–
Language, top responses (other than English)	Nepali	–	–	–	–	0.2%
Language, top responses (other than English)	Italian	0.2%	▼0.1%	0.1%	–	–
Religious affiliation						
Religious affiliation, top responses	Anglican	30.3%	▼28.1%	▼25.7%	▼21.7%	▼15.8%
Religious affiliation, top responses	Catholic	22.1%	▼21.4%	▲21.8%	▼19.4%	▼17.2%
Religious affiliation, top responses	No Religion	13.5%	▲17.8%	▲21.2%	▲29.2%	▲40.4%
Religious affiliation, top responses	Presbyterian and Reformed	6.2%	▼5.8%	▼5.5%	▼4.8%	▼3.6%
Religious affiliation, top responses	Uniting Church	6.8%	▼6.4%	▼5.3%	–	–
Religious affiliation, top responses	Median weekly incomes					
Personal income	Median weekly personal income		$296	▲$377	▲$467	▲$527
Personal income	% of Australian median income		63.5%	▲65.3%	▲70.5%	▼65.2%
Family income	Median weekly family income		$562	▲$853	▲$1080	▲$1309
Family income	% of Australian median income		54.7%	▲57.6%	▲62.2%	▼61.74%
Household income	Median weekly household income		$642	▲$700	▲$835	▲$976
Household income	% of Australian median income		54.8%	▲56.7%	▲58.1%	▼55.8

== Council ==
=== Current composition and election method ===
Nambucca Valley Council is composed of nine councillors, including the mayor, for a fixed four-year term of office. The mayor is directly elected while the eight other councillors are elected proportionally as one entire ward. The most recent election was held on 4 December 2021.

Party	Councillors
Independents	7
Labor	1
Greens	1
Total	9

The current Council, elected in 2024, in order of election, is:

Councillor	Party	Notes
Gary Lee	Independent	Mayor
James Angel	Independent	
Ljubov Simson	Independent	
David Jones	Greens	
Susan Jenvey	Labor	
Jane Smith	Independent	
Troy Vance	Independent	
Tamara Castle	Independent	
Martin Ballangarry	Independent	

== Election results ==
=== 2024 ===
2024 New South Wales local elections: Nambucca Valley
Party	Candidate	Votes	%	±%
Independent	Gary Lee	2,282	18.4	
Labor	Susan Jenvey (elected)	1,835	14.8	−1.7
Independent	James Angel (elected)	1,787	14.4	+7.5
Greens	David Jones (elected)	1,378	11.1	+7.7
Independent	Ljubov Simson (elected)	1,303	10.5	
Independent	Jane Smith (elected)	1,277	10.3	
Independent	Tamara Castle (elected)	1,131	9.1	
Independent	Troy Vance (elected)	658	5.3	+2.5
Independent	Martin Ballangarry (elected)	590	4.8	−1.4
Independent	Marc Percival	169	1.4	
Total formal votes		12,410	90.8	
Informal votes		1,261	9.2	
Turnout		13,671	81.7	

=== 2021 ===
2021 New South Wales local elections: Nambucca Valley
Party	Candidate	Votes	%	±%
Independent	Rhonda Hoban	5,161	42.9	
Labor	Susan Jenvey (elected)	1,984	16.5	
Independent	James Angel (elected)	828	6.9	
Independent	Ricky Buchanan (elected)	602	5.0	
Independent	Trevor Ballangarry (elected)	524	4.4	
Independent	David Hall	498	4.1	
Independent	David Jones (elected)	415	3.4	
Independent	Martin Ballangarry (elected)	414	3.4	
Independent	Barry Clow	365	3.0	
Independent	Peter Sobey	352	2.9	
Independent	Michael Scafidi	345	2.9	
Independent	Troy Vance (elected)	342	2.8	
Independent	John Wilson (elected)	213	1.8	
Total formal votes		12,043	93.9	
Informal votes		783	6.1	
Turnout		12,826	80.4	

== See also ==
- Local government in New South Wales
