= Bellingen Shire =

- Local government area
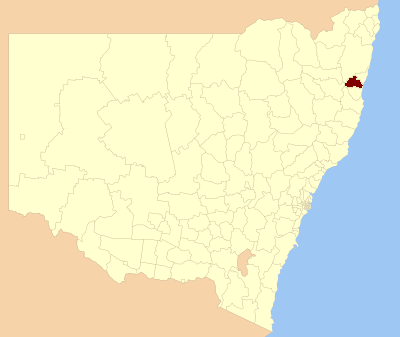
- Location in New South Wales

- Interactive map of Bellingen Shire
- Coordinates: 30°27′S 152°54′E
- Country: Australia
- State: New South Wales
- Region: Mid North Coast
- Council seat: Bellingen

Government
  - Mayor: Steve Allan (Independent)
  - State electorates: Oxley; Coffs Harbour
  - Federal division: Cowper

Area
  - Total: 1,602 km^{2} (619 sq mi)

Population
  - Total: 13,253 (2021 census)
  - Density: 8.2728/km^{2} (21.426/sq mi)
- Website: Bellingen Shire
LGAs around Bellingen Shire
Clarence Valley	Coffs Harbour	Coffs Harbour
Armidale	Bellingen Shire	Tasman Sea
Kempsey	Nambucca	Tasman Sea

Bellingen Shire is a local government area in the Mid North Coast region of New South Wales, Australia. The shire is located adjacent to the Pacific Highway, Waterfall Way and the North Coast railway line.

The mayor of the Bellingen Shire is Steve Allan, an independent.

== Towns and localities ==
Towns and localities in the Bellingen Shire are:

- Bellingen
- Bostobrick
- Brierfield
- Cascade
- Darkwood
- Deer Vale
- Dorrigo
- Fernmount
- Gleniffer
- Hydes Creek
- Leigh
- Megan
- Mylestom
- Orama
- Raleigh
- Repton
- Tarkeeth
- Thora
- Urunga
- Valery

== Demographics ==
At the 2011 census, there were 12,518 people in the Bellingen local government area, of these 48.5 per cent were male and 51.5 per cent were female. Aboriginal and Torres Strait Islander people made up 3.0 per cent of the population which is higher than the national and state averages of 2.5 per cent. The median age of people in the Bellingen Shire was 46 years; some 10 years higher than the national median. Children aged 0 – 14 years made up 19.5 per cent of the population and people aged 65 years and over made up 19.9 per cent of the population. Of people in the area aged 15 years and over, 46.1 per cent were married and 17.4 per cent were either divorced or separated.

Population growth in the Bellingen Shire between the 2001 census, 2006 census, and the 2011 census was marginal. When compared with total population growth of Australia for the same periods, being 5.78 per cent and 8.32 per cent respectively, population growth in the Bellingen local government area was significantly lower than the national average. The median weekly income for residents within the Bellingen Shire was significantly below the national average, being one of the factors that place the Bellingen Shire in an area of social disadvantage.

At the 2011 Census, the proportion of residents in the Bellingen local government area who stated their ancestry as Australian or Anglo-Celtic exceeded 82 per cent of all residents (national average was 65.2 per cent). In excess of 69 per cent of all residents in the Bellingen Shire nominated a religious affiliation with Christianity at the 2011 Census, which was significantly above the national average of 50.2 per cent. Meanwhile, as at the Census date, compared to the national average, households in the Bellingen local government area had a significantly lower than average proportion (4.7 per cent) where two or more languages are spoken (national average was 20.4 per cent); and a significantly higher proportion (94.1 per cent) where English only was spoken at home (national average was 76.8 per cent).

Selected historical census data for Bellingen local government area
Census year		2001	2006	2011	2016	2021
Population	Estimated residents on census night	12,171	▲12,416	▲12,518	▲12,668	▲13,253
Population	LGA rank in terms of size within New South Wales			85th	▲84th	▲81st
Population	% of New South Wales population			0.18%		
Population	% of Australian population	0.06%	0.06%	0.06%		
Cultural and language diversity						
Ancestry, top responses	English			32.3%		
Ancestry, top responses	Australian			31.5%		
Ancestry, top responses	Irish			10.3%		
Ancestry, top responses	Scottish			8.7%		
Ancestry, top responses	German			3.4%		
Language, top responses (other than English)	German	0.8%	▼0.6%	▲0.7%		
Language, top responses (other than English)	Dutch	0.2%	0.2%	▲0.4%		
Language, top responses (other than English)	Spanish	n/c	▲0.1%	▲0.3%		
Language, top responses (other than English)	French	0.2%	▼0.1%	▲0.3%		
Language, top responses (other than English)	Cantonese	0.2%	0.2%	▼0.1%		
Religious affiliation						
Religious affiliation, top responses	No Religion	20.5%	▲26.0%	▲31.5%		
Religious affiliation, top responses	Anglican	26.8%	▼24.9%	▼23.4%		
Religious affiliation, top responses	Catholic	18.0%	▼17.4%	▼16.1%		
Religious affiliation, top responses	Uniting Church	9.1%	▼7.7%	▼6.8%		
Religious affiliation, top responses	Presbyterian and Reformed	3.4%	▼2.9%	▲3.1%		
Median weekly incomes						
Personal income	Median weekly personal income		A$336	A$416		
Personal income	% of Australian median income		72.1%	72.1%		
Family income	Median weekly family income		A$622	A$938		
Family income	% of Australian median income		60.6%	63.3%		
Household income	Median weekly household income		A$777	A$787		
Household income	% of Australian median income		66.4%	63.8%		

== Council ==
Bellingen Shire Council is composed of seven councillors, including the mayor, for a fixed four-year term of office. The mayor is directly elected while the six other councillors are elected proportionally as one entire ward. The most recent election was held on 4 December 2021, and the makeup of the council, including the mayor, is as follows:

Party	Councillors
Waterfall Way Independents	3
The Greens	2
Independents	1
Stephen Glyde Group	1
Total	7

The current Council, elected in 2021, in order of election, is:

Councillor	Party	Notes
Steve Allan	Waterfall Way Independents	Mayor
Dominic King	Greens	
Jo Brotherton	Waterfall Way Independents	
Ellie Tree	Waterfall Way Independents	
Joanne Cook	Independent	Deputy mayor
Stephen Glyde	Stephen Glyde Group	
Jennie Fenton	Greens	

== Election results ==
=== 2024 ===
2024 New South Wales local elections: Bellingen
Party	Candidate	Votes	%	±%
Waterfall Way Inds	1. Steve Allan; 2. Eleanor Tree (elected 1); 3. Jo Brotherton (elected 3); 4. Andrew O'Keefe (elected 6); 5. Linda Coomber; 6. Steve Ryan	4,342	53.6	+19.8
Greens	1. Dominic King (elected 2); 2. Jennie Fenton (elected 4); 3. Gary Fry; 4. Wendy Firefly	2,481	30.6	+4.7
Community First	1. Graeme Shephard (elected 5); 2. Joanne Cook; 3. Cathryn McGuire; 4. Stephen Glyde	1,273	15.7	+1.7 (Note: Compared with Team Joanne Cook at the 2021 election.)
Total formal votes		8,096	95.3	
Informal votes		404	4.7	
Turnout		8,500	81.5	

=== 2021 ===
2021 New South Wales local elections: Bellingen
Party	Candidate	Votes	%	±%
Waterfall Way Inds	1. Steve Allan; 2. Jo Brotherton; 3. Eleanor Tree; 4. Lee Grundy; 5. Janette Fairleigh; 6. Steve Ryan	2,800	33.9	+33.9
Greens	1. Dominic King; 2. Jennie Fenton; 3. Alison Heeley; 4. Toni Wright-Turner	2,145	25.9	−2.5
Team Joanne Cook	1. Joanne Cook; 2. Graeme Shephard; 3. Tabitha Vanzanten; 4. Christopher Shirley; 5. Philip Kennedy	1,163	14.1	
Stephen Glyde Group	1. Stephen Glyde; 2. Vanessa Machon; 3. James Anderson	990	12.0	
Labor	1. Andrew Woodward; 2. Paul Hemphill; 3. Paul Mulally; 4. Danielle Matignier-Babb	838	10.1	
Independent	1. Steve Klipin; 2. Boaz Keeda; 3. Robin Ashley	334	4.0	
Total formal votes		8,270	95.9	
Informal votes		352	4.1	
Turnout		8,622	83.8	

== See also ==
- Local government areas of New South Wales
