= Macksville, New South Wales =

Macksville New South Wales
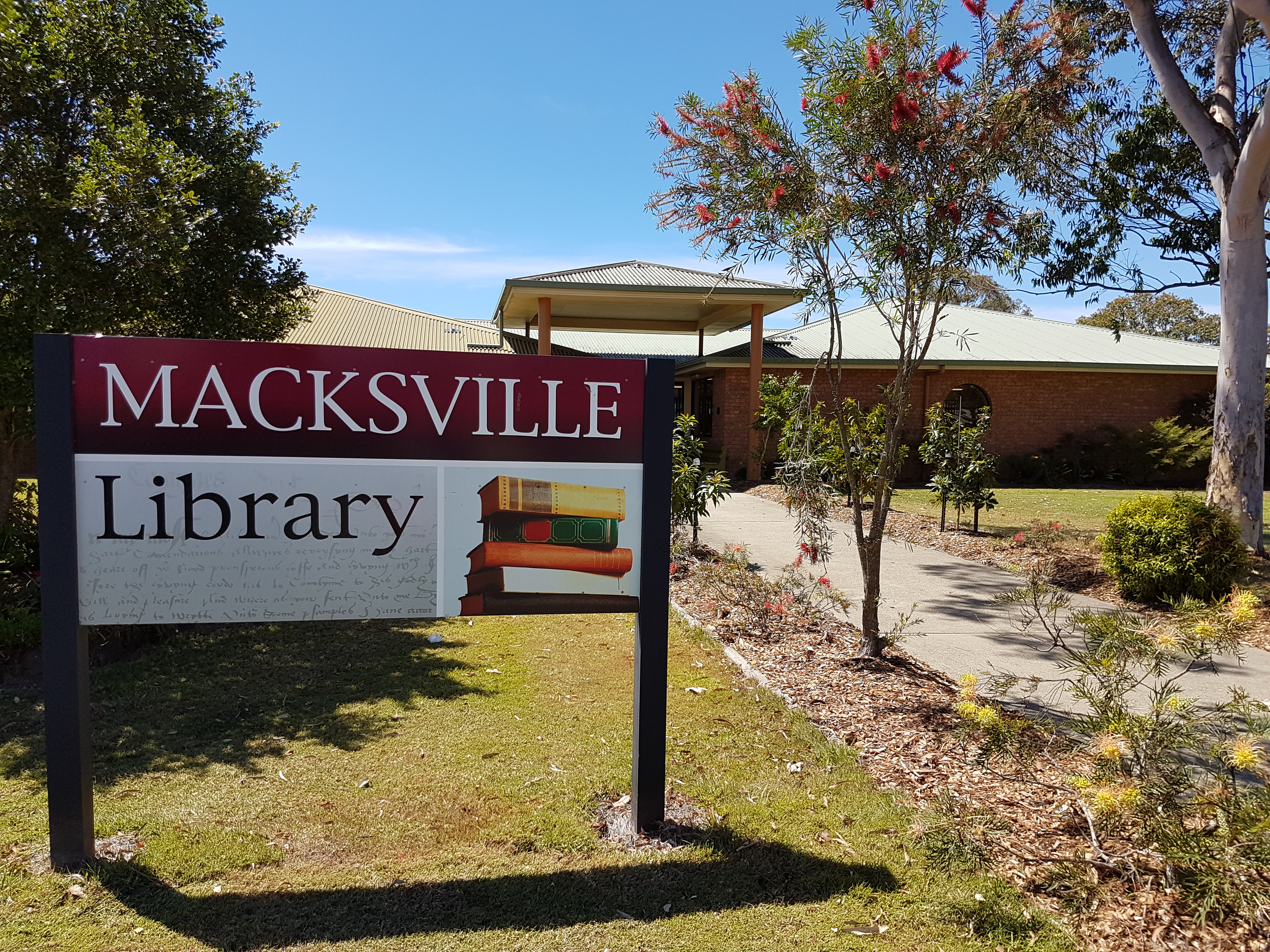

- Coordinates: 30°43′0″S 152°55′0″E
- Population: 2,782 (2021 census)
- Postcode(s): 2447
- Elevation: 3 m (10 ft)
- Time zone: AEST (UTC+10)
  - Summer (DST): AEDT (UTC+11)
- Location: 471 km (293 mi) N of Sydney; 441 km (274 mi) S of Brisbane; 57 km (35 mi) SSW of Coffs Harbour; 13 km (8 mi) SW of Nambucca Heads; 47 km (29 mi) NNE of Kempsey
- LGA(s): Nambucca Valley Council
- State electorate(s): Oxley
- Federal division(s): Cowper

Macksville is a small town on the Nambucca River in the Nambucca Valley, New South Wales, Australia. It is halfway between Sydney and Brisbane, along the Pacific Highway, approximately 40 minutes north of Kempsey, 40 minutes south of Coffs Harbour, 70 minutes north of Port Macquarie, five hours south of Brisbane and five hours north of Sydney.

== Demographics ==
At the 2021 census, Macksville had a population of 2,782, despite the sign at the entrance to the town claiming a population of 7000 (this figure represents the population of Macksville & surrounds). This included 8.9% Indigenous persons, 5.6% born overseas, and 84.7% born in Australia.

Historical population
Year	Pop.	±%
1954	2,007	—
1961	2,114	+5.3%
1966	2,129	+0.7%
1971	2,252	+5.8%
1976	2,277	+1.1%
1981	2,352	+3.3%
1986	2,811	+19.5%
1991	2,869	+2.1%
1996	2712	—
2001	2,658	—
2006	2,658	+0.0%
2011	2,786	+4.8%
2016	2,598	−6.7%
2021	2,782	+7.1%
Source: Australian Bureau of Statistics data.

== Facilities ==
It is home to the Macksville Bridge, Macksville RSL, and Star Hotel, located on River Street and overlooking the Nambucca River. The Nambucca Valley Council chambers are located in Macksville.

== History ==
Macksville was named after Angus Mackay and Hugh McNally, who built the Star Hotel in 1885. The town became Macks Village before changing to Macksville.

Nambucca Post Office opened on 1 August 1868 and was renamed Macksville in 1889. The first Nambucca River road bridge that carried the Pacific Highway, opened on 12 December 1931 replacing a ferry service.

Australian Test cricketer Phillip Hughes, who was born and raised in Macksville, was struck on the neck by a cricket ball in a Sheffield Shield match in November 2014, and died several days later. The funeral, held at Macksville High School, brought global attention to the quiet country town. In December 2017, the Pacific Highway bridge bypassing the town, over the Nambucca River, was named in his honour.

== Heritage listings ==
Macksville has a number of heritage-listed sites, including:

- North Coast railway: Macksville railway station
- River Street: Macksville Post Office

== Industry ==
Express Coach Builders, formerly Nambucca River Engineering, has been bodying buses in Macksville since 1971.

== Media ==
Radio stations accessible in Macksville include Triple M (2CS-FM 106.3 and 2MC-FM 106.7), hit (105.5 & 105.1) and Triple J (91.5 & 96.3). There is also a Nambucca Valley community radio station (2NVR 105.9FM) which focuses on the Macksville, Bowraville, Nambucca Heads and surrounding communities. Local papers include the Midcoast Observer, Hibiscus Happynings and Guardian News. There are no local television stations but all major free-to-air networks broadcast to the town.

== Sport and recreation ==
Macksville has a strong sporting history. Each November it holds NSW's oldest professional foot race, the 120m Macksville Gift. In 2023 the Men's Gift winner was Leonard King and the Women's Gift winner was Emma Lee.

Macksville is known for its passion for rugby league and has been the home of Group 2 Rugby League club Macksville Sea Eagles since 1912. Between 2002 and 2007 Macksville won five Group 2 titles.

== Notable people ==
- Daniel Fitzhenry, rugby league player for Wests Tigers
- Matt Gillett, rugby league player for Brisbane Broncos and Australia
- Phillip Hughes, Test cricketer
- Greg Inglis, rugby league player for South Sydney Rabbitohs and Australia, spent part of his childhood in Macksville
- Albert Kelly, rugby league player for Brisbane Broncos
- Frank Partridge VC, decorated World War II soldier and regular on radio quiz show Pick a Box
- David Pereira, cellist
- Aden Ridgeway, former NSW Senator
- Noel Rowe, poet
- Ryan Stig, rugby league player for Newcastle Knights

== Schools ==
- Macksville Public School
- St Patrick's Primary School
- Macksville High School
- Macksville Adventist School

== Culture, events and festivals ==
Macksville holds an annual show. The Macksville Show is held on the last weekend in April. The showground also hosts a range of other events throughout the year including cattle sales, the "Rusty Iron Rally" and "Pro-Ag". Since 2013 Macksville has held a river festival that includes fireworks, music, magical floating lanterns and show rides. It is organised by both Macksville and Nambucca Rotary Clubs. A new riverside stage was constructed for the 2015 event. In 2016 the event was discontinued due to being financially unviable.

== Transportation ==
Macksville is halfway between Sydney and Brisbane on the Pacific Highway. The town was bypassed in late 2017. The new bridge across the Nambucca River built as part of the Macksville bypass is officially named The Phillip Hughes Bridge, named after the late cricketer originally from the town. Macksville railway station is on North Coast railway line.
