= Smoky Cape Lighthouse =

Lighthouse in New South Wales, Australia

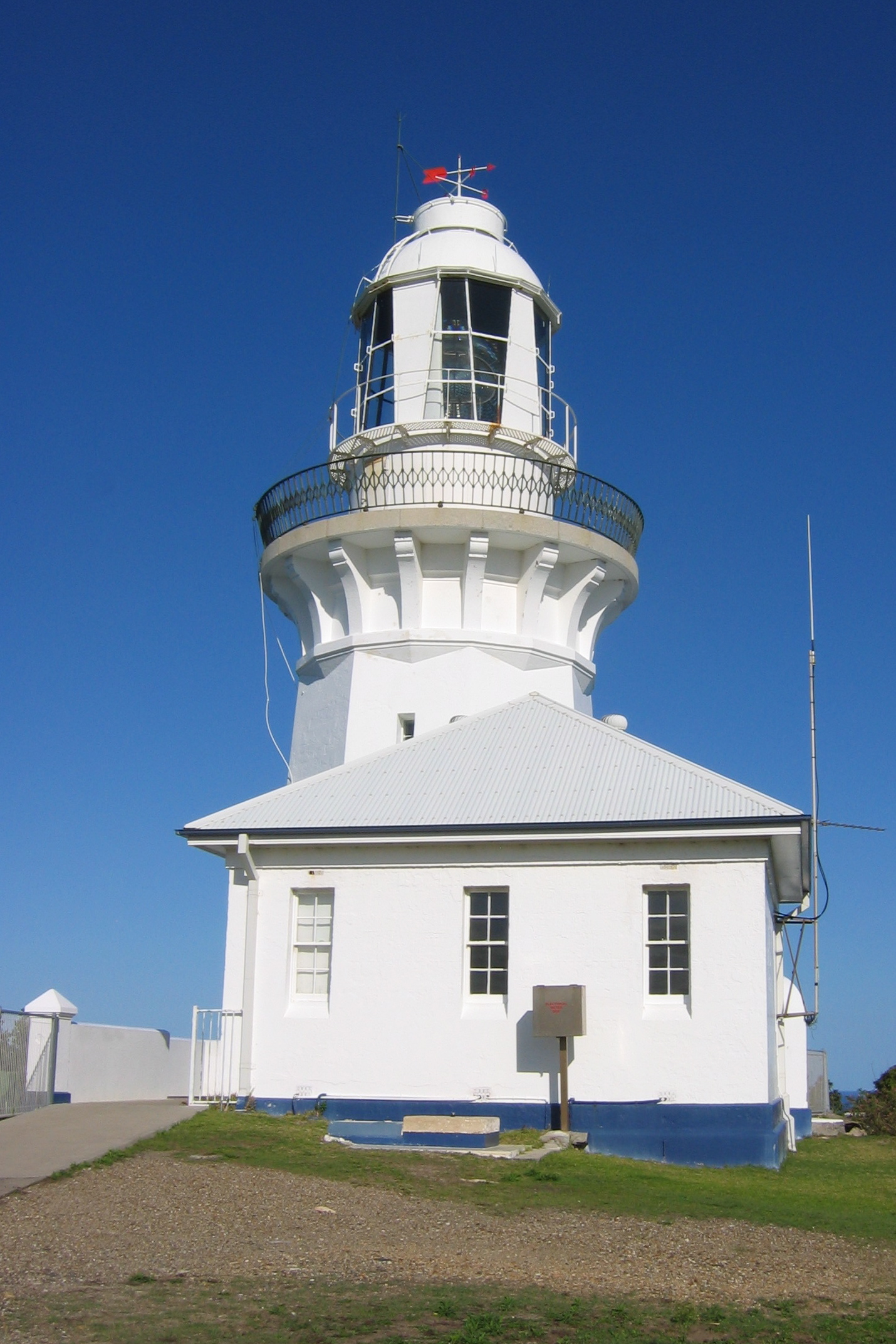
- Smoky Cape Lighthouse, near South West Rocks
- Location: Smoky Cape; New South Wales; Australia
- Coordinates: 30°55′22.4″S 153°05′14.5″E

Tower
- Constructed: 1891
- Construction: concrete tower
- Automated: 1988
- Height: 17.4 metres (57 ft)
- Shape: octagonal tower with balcony and lantern attached to 1-story building
- Markings: white tower and building
- Power source: mains electricity
- Operator: Australian Maritime Safety Authority
- Heritage: listed on the Commonwealth Heritage List, Heritage Act — State Heritage Register

Light
- Focal height: 128 metres (420 ft)
- Lens: First order Fresnel lens
- Intensity: 1,000,000 cd
- Range: 26 nautical miles (48 km; 30 mi)
- Characteristic: Fl (3) W 20s.

Smoky Cape Lighthouse is a heritage-listed active lighthouse located on Smoky Cape, a headland in Arakoon east of the town of South West Rocks, Kempsey Shire, New South Wales, Australia, and within the Hat Head National Park. It directs boats towards the entrance to the Macleay River, which is located just to the north of the lighthouse.

It is one of the last major lighthouse complexes designed by the New South Wales colonial architect of the time, James Barnet, and was one of Australia's last lighthouses to be designed for architectural excellence. Standing on a granite headland 111 metres (364 ft) above the sea, its light is the highest in New South Wales.

It was added to the New South Wales State Heritage Register on 2 April 1999.

== History ==
The South West Rocks area was well known for many years because of its prominent coastal geography. A journal entry recorded on Sunday May 13, 1770 by Captain James Cook describes a point "or a head land, on which we saw fires that produced a great quantity of smoke, bore W. distant four leagues. To this point, I gave the name of Smoky Cape; it is of a considerable height, and over the pitch of the Point, is a round hillock; within it are two others, much higher and larger and within them the land is very low". Earliest European contact was not until 1816, when the brig, Trial, hijacked by convicts was wrecked at Trial Bay. Subsequently, explorer John Oxley visited the area in 1817. Trial Bay was noted early as a valuable haven for passing ships during southerly gales because of its northerly aspect and position midway between Sydney and Brisbane. Shipping was the primary mode of trade and transport for the eastern seaboard communities.

More than twenty wrecks have occurred in the area of the headland, several of them with losses of life. Three men died when the ketch Woolloomooloo was wrecked in Trial Bay in 1864 and nine died in the wreck of the brig Annie Ogle in 1875. A number of ships have been wrecked in the Bay area with more lost around the headland and immediate coastline. The first action to establish a light at Smoky Cape was taken by Alexander Kethel, member for West Sydney in the New South Wales Legislative Assembly, who in 1886 passed a resolution stating that, for the benefit of the increasing coast trade and navigation it was necessary to erect a lighthouse at Smoky Cape.

A sum of 18,000 pounds was set aside for the construction of the complex. The Colonial Architect, James Barnet, who played an important role in the design and construction of lights at South Solitary Island, Montague Island and Green Cape, selected the site and prepared the necessary documentation. During the design stage major changes in organisation occurred. James Barnet was dismissed in 1890 and the office of the Colonial Architect was replaced with that of Government Architect. The project was then handed to C. W. Darley, Engineer-in-Chief for Harbours and Rivers. Barnets original design was however used for the Lighthouse.

Tenders for the work were called in January 1889 and the offer from Messrs. Oakes and Company was successful. The contract called for the construction of the tower and annex, the head keeper's residence and semi detached assistant keepers cottages, a coach house and stables. All were to be erected on an 81 acres reserve, 128 metres above sea level. By 1889 construction was well underway and a notice was given to mariner's informing them of the construction of the lighthouse with full particulars coming at a later date. It was reported the contractor, a Mr Oakes died during the construction of the complex, however it was completed by his heirs within budget.

The light was first exhibited on the 15 April 1891. The official ceremony, attended by Darley and members of the Marine Board, taking place on the 29 April 1891. In 1912 the original light source was replaced and in 1962 was changed again to an electric lamp and new thrust bearing pedestal system.

As a result of the Commonwealth Lighthouses Act of 1911, management of the lighthouse was transferred in 1915 to Federal control because of its status as a coastal light.

Since 1939, the lighthouse has been an Australian Bureau of Meteorology site for the gathering of climate statistics.

During the World War 2, the lighthouse precinct was used for military purposes. There was a searchlight battery and light gun emplacement, and possibly a radio room, operating there at that time. The concrete remains of the military installation are still visible.

In 1962 the light was electrified and around 1988 it was automated. The optic system is still the original first order Fresnel lens.

On May 14, 1998, Smoky Cape was the first NSW Parks and Wildlife Service lighthouse to be opened for tours.

== Design ==
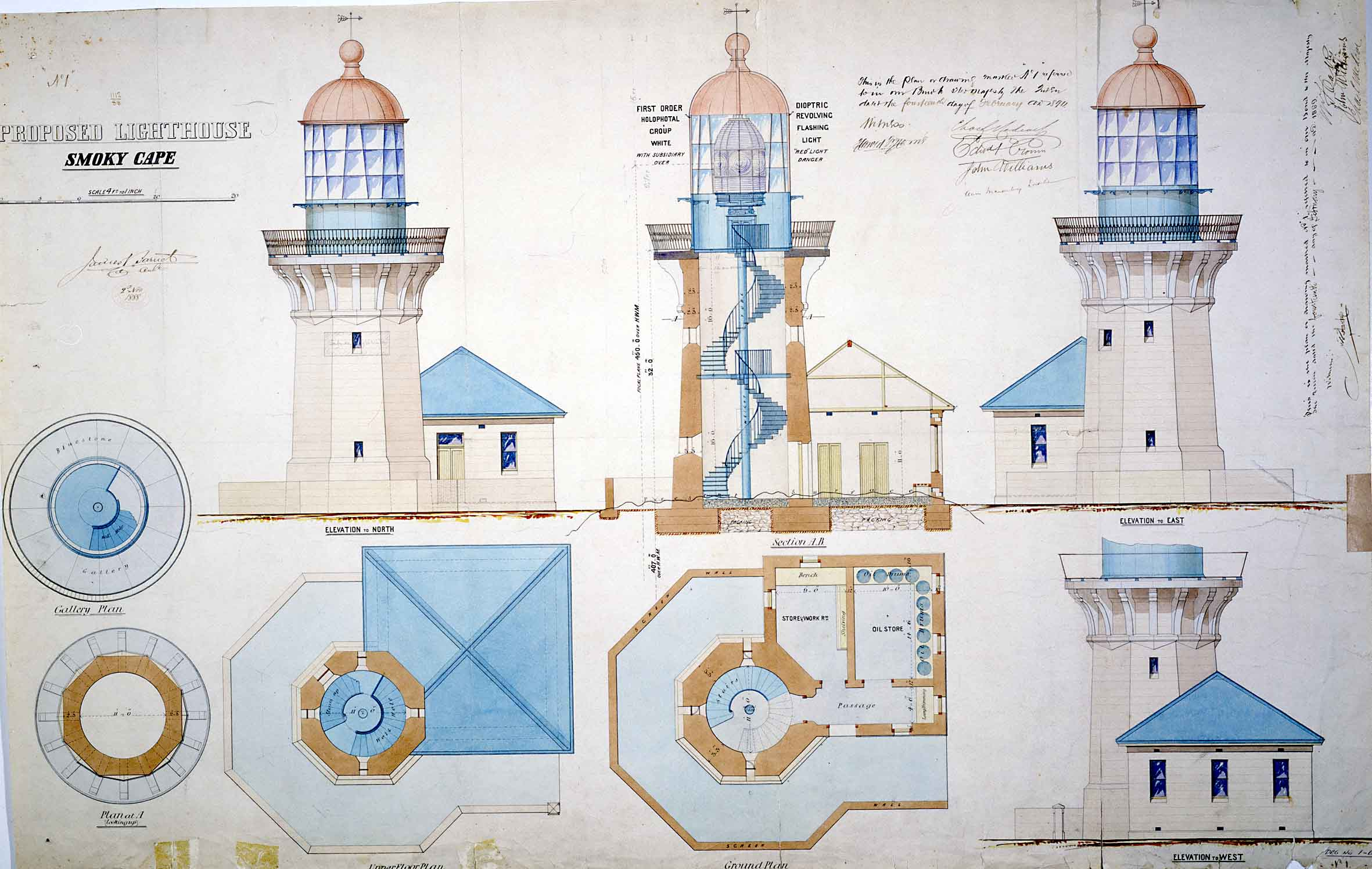
Lighthouse plans, 1888

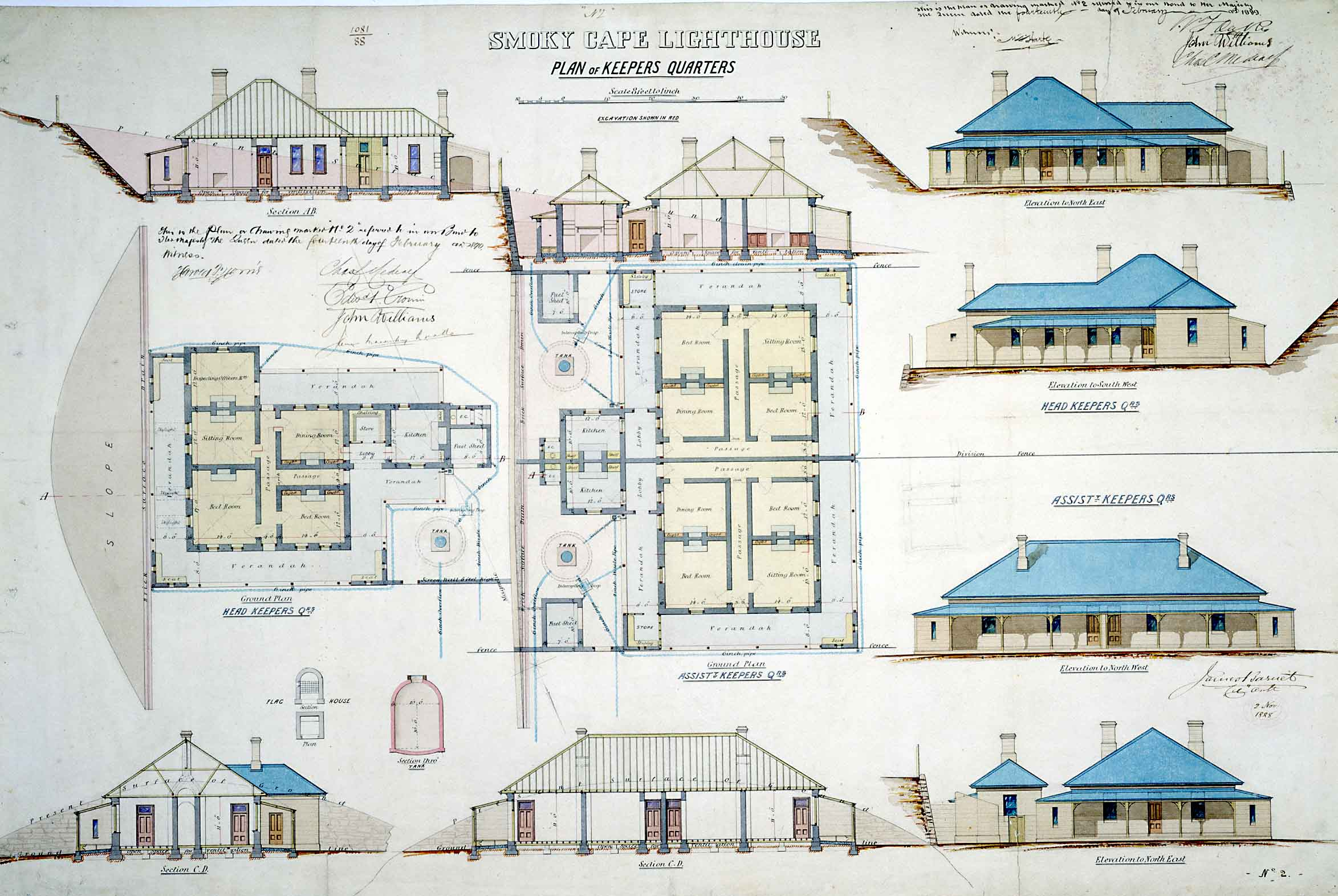
Keepers' quarters plans, 1888

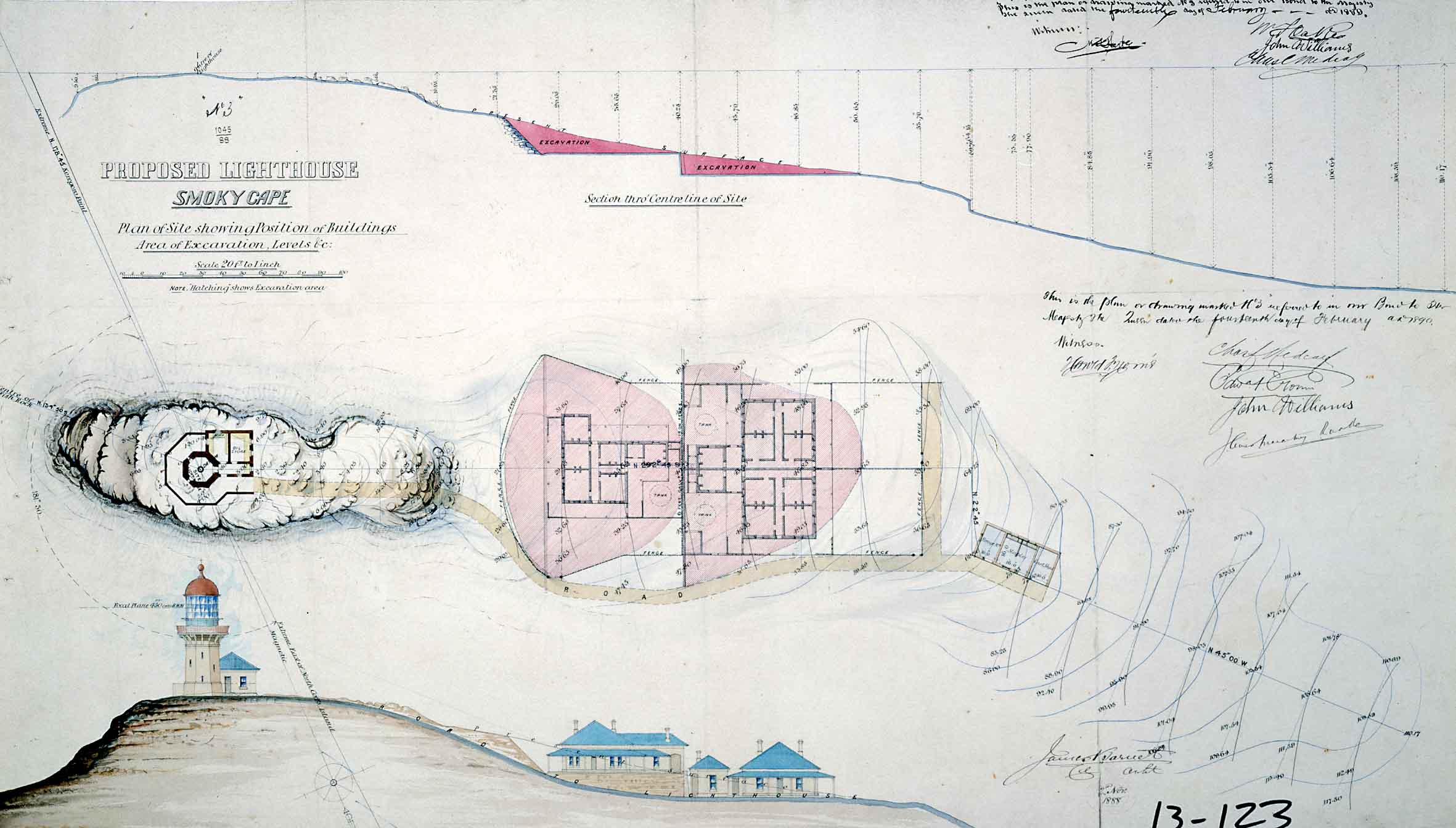
Plan of site, 1888

The lighthouse's design is unusual for its octagonal tower, and was so designed because it was easier to cast the tower in the octagonal formwork than round formwork. It has a single-story pavilion entrance, cast-iron staircase and distinctive gunmetal balustrade. It is one of only three nineteenth century mass concrete lighthouses in NSW (the others being South Solitary Island Lighthouse and Green Cape Lighthouse). The fact that it has its original Chance Brothers revolving apparatus and lens, and lantern house, makes it an important example of late nineteenth century industrial maritime technology.

== Description ==
=== Context ===
Smoky Cape is located to the south east of South West Rocks a seaside resort town situated at the mouth of the Macleay River, 35 kilometres north east of Kempsey and midway between Coffs Harbour and Port Macquarie. South West Rocks has a variety of beaches facing in different directions. East of the township is Laggers Point which extends north west with a west facing beach at its base. Southeast of the point are a number of small protected beaches such as Horseshoe Bay and Little Bay. Gap Beach and North Smoky are long stretches of forest fringed beaches. Trial Bay Gaol, which occupies Laggers Point is a prominent tourist attraction dating from the same period as Smoky Cape.

The Lighthouse is sited on the top of a bluff, which then falls away to the sea below. The support buildings are set below and behind the lighthouse for more protection from adverse weather. The main cottage and two assistants cottages are sited on level platforms, cut into the steep slopes and stabilised by high concrete retaining walls. The stables are set well below the cottages, near the entry to the precinct. The site rises steeply from the carpark to the Lighthouse and its narrow pathway is known as "Heart Attack Hill". There is little on site car parking. Cars presently can drive up a narrow driveway, but must traverse all the way up the lighthouse forecourt before turning around and descending to the small grassed plot in front of the Head Lighthouse keeper's cottage

=== Buildings and structures ===
The Lighthouse Precinct consists of:

- Lighthouse and attached engine room
- Signal House
- Headkeepers Cottage
- Two attached Assistant keepers cottages
- Former Stables buildings
- Garage
- Small freestanding office/weather station
- Small flag room and several former fuel stores.

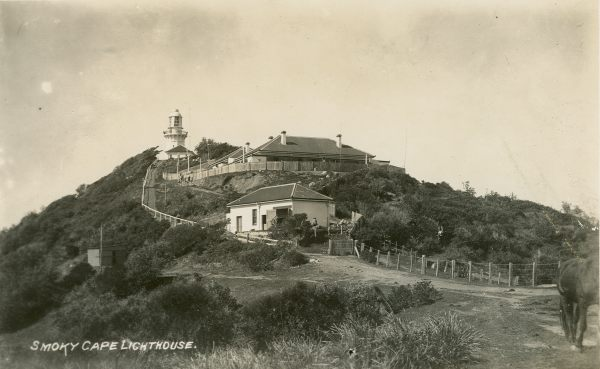
An historic view of the lighthouse

==== The Lighthouse Tower ====
The Lighthouse is octagonal with large single storey entry pavilion. Constructed in mass concrete the tower is 17.4 metres tall and has a Chance Bros. lantern and lens. Cast iron stairs lead up to the gallery level.

An early description of the tower refers to two storeys with iron floors and staircases and walls of mass concrete. The gallery round lantern is of granite supported on moulded granite cantilevers with gun metal railing. The tower is entered from an enclosed passage protected by a screen wall which is constructed around the base of the structure. The floors of the storerooms are paved in concrete and cemented. The tower is divided into two storeys with iron floors and staircases. The walls are 920mm thick at the base and taper to 620mm at the top and are constructed of mass concrete using locally mined granite as the aggregate and are cemented externally and internally. The gallery floor of the lantern is formed of granite voussoir blocks supported on molded granite brackets. An ornate metal railing featuring Queen Victoria's mark is used for the handrailing at this level.

The tower walls feature a number of openings including a light opening located below the balcony which housed a subsidiary red light to cover Fish Rock. The tower is entered from an enclosed passage which also accesses the two store rooms and are also constructed of mass concrete. A screen wall also of mass concrete is built around the tower.

The ground floor rooms were originally used as store and work room. In 1912 the original burner was replaced by an incandescent vaporised kerosene burner. Again in 1962 the light was altered to a mains electric operation with an increased power. The structure has also undergone a number of other fabric alterations including the roofing to the pavilion which was replaced in zincalume in 1990.

The Lighthouse is maintained by AMSA and has recently been painted. The original optic remains but the light source has been updated. The light still operates at night and is screened from view towards the settled areas to the south west.

==== Head Lighthouse Keeper's Cottage ====
The Headkeeper's Quarters designed in 1888 is also constructed in concrete with rendered finish. The building was constructed with two bedrooms, sitting room Inspecting Officer's Room, dining room, kitchens and stores. Most of the building was surrounded by verandah with the corner windbreaks at the north and south eastern corners. The building extends from the north western corner and incorporates store and enclosure forming a courtyard which houses one of the underground water tanks. The building also has verandahs on the northern and southern facades which are connected by a central passage. Another verandah is located on the eastern facade of the building and faces a concrete retaining wall.

==== Assistant Keeper's Cottages ====
The Assistants quarters are two semi-detached cottages originally containing four rooms, with kitchen and store areas. The buildings were also constructed of mass concrete cement rendered externally and plastered internally. The roofs originally clad in galvanised iron.

The northern residence has the characteristic corner wind break at the north western corner flanked by two open verandahs on the northern and western facades. A verandah located on the eastern facade of the building was enclosed during the 1970s, however the kitchen and store areas continue to enclose the courtyard space to the east of the building. A concrete retaining wall forms the eastern boundary of the courtyard. All of the ceilings were battened during the 1920s through to the 1940s over either the original lath and plaster or later fibrous plaster. The ceilings to the lobby and kitchen appear to be fibre board with timber battens.

The northern residence now has three bedrooms, a door opening was made in the dividing party wall between the two residences and partitions erected to facilitate the use of an extra bedroom. The other, southern residence has two bedrooms in addition to kitchen, bathroom and outside toilets. Enclosed balconies provide additional space. The residences generally feature hipped roofs with painted brick chimneys and skillion roof verandahs supported on simply decorated timber posts.

A car park and sealed access road were added in the 1970s.

==== Other structures and elements ====
Three cement rendered underground water tanks remain the capacity in proportion with each residence. The accompanying pumps however have been removed. A modern steel water tank has been constructed in the courtyard of northern assistant keeper's residence. Paving, fencing, retaining walls and remnant gardens surround the complex. The footings of the flagstaff remain in front of the lighthouse, but the flagstaff has been removed. It was an integral part of the operation of the Lighthouse and can be partly seen in the AMSA brochure on the Lighthouse.

== Operation and tourism ==
The lighthouse is operated by the Australian Maritime Safety Authority and is classified by the National Trust of Australia (NSW).

Its nearest lighthouses are South Solitary Island Lighthouse north of Coffs Harbour, to the north, and Tacking Point Lighthouse at Port Macquarie, to the south.

The lighthouse complex is located in Hat Head National Park. The head keeper's cottage is now run as a bed and breakfast, and two other cottages as holiday houses, leased from the NSW National Parks and Wildlife Service.

The cape is a popular point for whale-watching.

== Heritage listing ==
Smoky Cape Lightstation and its setting are highly significant as one of a collection of lighthouses which combine the natural values of a rugged coastal environment with the cultural values of a prominent landmark. Built as an isolated outpost of European settlement it demonstrates the development of coastal shipping in the late 19th century. The light tower retains its original function today using recent technology to allow for automated operation. It is a notable work of NSW Colonial Architect James Barnet which retains components of 19th-century lighthouse technologies. This site retains evidence of cultural values, both Aboriginal and European which demonstrates the changing uses of the site, against a constant of natural values.

Smoky Cape Lighthouse was listed on the New South Wales State Heritage Register on 2 April 1999 having satisfied the following criteria:

The place is important in demonstrating the course, or pattern, of cultural or natural history in New South Wales.

Smoky Cape was named by Captain Cook in 1770 for the large number of fires observed along the range. The Lighthouse precinct and Trial Bay Goal together provide a fine example of Colonial architecture and planning and of Colonial government settlement in the area. World War 2 radar installations and ruins show the more recent use of the area for defence purposes. James Barnet designed a series of lighthouse towers in NSW which are reported as being the most architecturally sophisticated in Australia. Smoky Cape retains the distinctive bracketed capital and gunmetal balcony balustrade characteristic to Barnet's design. The pavilion entrance is also a feature reintroduced by Barnet and in evidence at Smoky Cape. The cast-iron stair is also a good example of its type.

The place is important in demonstrating aesthetic characteristics and/or a high degree of creative or technical achievement in New South Wales.

Smoky Cape is an outstanding and relatively intact example of a late Victorian Lightstation unique in NSW for the use of in-situ mass concrete in the construction of its main buildings. The lighthouse is a fine example constructed in an unusual hexagonal shape with a rare first order Chance Bros. rotating optic. The residences display the robust design typical of Barnet's work, planned to embody the hierarchy of the keepers. Each has a view to the tower. The design is more elaborate than its contemporaries in other States. The natural setting provides a picturesque landscape quality with a sense of isolation accentuated by the siting, with no other man-made elements visible from most of the headland or beaches.

The place has a strong or special association with a particular community or cultural group in New South Wales for social, cultural or spiritual reasons.

The Smoky Range is significant to the Aboriginal populations with a number of mythological associations. In addition, the lightstation and its setting have significance to Europeans as a remote outpost continuously occupied for over 100 years and closely associated with the maritime history of the area. It is a place that attracts many visitors to admire its character, setting and history. It is highly regarded by local and regional populations of the area as one of the oldest and substantially intact building complexes surviving from the Colonial era. The location offers scope for the interpretation of coastal processes in conjunction with cultural values.

The place has potential to yield information that will contribute to an understanding of the cultural or natural history of New South Wales.

Smoky Cape is part of a cohesive group of late 19th- and early 20th-century lightstations in NSW each of which demonstrates the incremental changes in the design and construction of the various complexes. The tower and houses are constructed of mass concrete using aggregate of locally quarried granite and cement rendered both internally and externally. The use of concrete in Australian lighthouses was relatively widespread. In NSW, however, Green Cape and Smoky Cape lighthouses are the only known in-situ concrete towers and both are relatively early uses of concrete. Throughout Australia Smoky Cape is one of approximately 10 in-situ concrete towers constructed prior to 1920. The optic, cast-iron and copper lantern house are examples of the late 19th-century industrial technology. The optic is rare due to its detailed configuration consisting of triple panels which provide the triple group flash. One of numerous 12' diameter Chance lanterns, it is one of only four known to have both a trapezoidal glazing pattern and Trinity type vent.

The place possesses uncommon, rare or endangered aspects of the cultural or natural history of New South Wales.

Early use of mass concrete, together with unusual technology in lantern and lens.

The place is important in demonstrating the principal characteristics of a class of cultural or natural places/environments in New South Wales.

Representative of the work of James Barnet, NSW Colonial Architect.

== See also ==
- List of lighthouses in Australia
