= South West Rocks Pilot Station Complex =

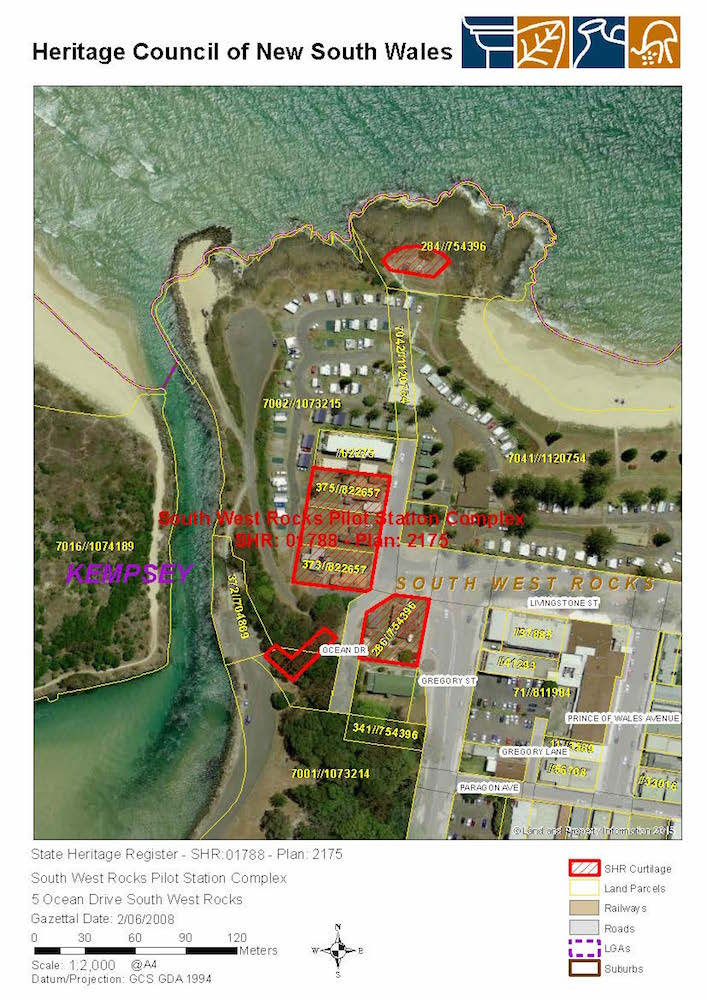
- Heritage boundaries

- Location within New South Wales Location within Australia
- 30.8840°S 153.0388°E
- Location: 5 Ocean Drive, South West Rocks, Kempsey Shire, New South Wales, Australia

History
- Built: 1902–1902

New South Wales Heritage Register
- Official name: South West Rocks Pilot Station Complex; South West Rocks Pilot Station
- Type: state heritage (complex / group)
- Designated: 2 June 2008
- Reference no.: 1788
- Type: Other - Maritime Industry
- Category: Maritime Industry
- Builders: C B Smith

South West Rocks Pilot Station Complex is a heritage-listed former pilot station at 5 Ocean Drive, South West Rocks, Kempsey Shire, New South Wales, Australia. It was built in 1902 by C. B. Smith. It was added to the New South Wales State Heritage Register on 2 June 2008.

== History ==
This group of maritime buildings was a 1902 transplant forced to its new location by an 1893 flood. Until 1893 the Pilot, his crew, and all their families worked at Grassy Head a few kilometers north of South West Rocks. In 1893 the valley was devastated by one of the worst floods in its history. It rampaged through the district finally bursting through the sand hills near South West Rocks to form a new entrance, the name it now bears.

The Government of New South Wales decided in 1895 to stabilise this most recent breakout and close the rapidly shoaling channel under Grassy Head.

Three thousand pounds was voted for a new pilot station at South West Rocks. The new site was pegged out on the eastern side of South West Rocks Creek (known locally as "Backwater Creek"), a small water body that lies between South West Rocks and the New Entrance.

The lowest bid was that of C.B. Smith. The Department of Navigation then amended the plans but Smith agreed to incorporate the changes without increasing the charges. The cottages were pre-cut and were probably the first pre-cut buildings to be built in the Macleay Valley.

The complex consisted of five cottages to house the pilot and his four crewmen. The boatman's cottages are numbered sequentially from 1 to 4 and eastward from the Pilot's residence. A boatshed on the banks of Back Creek connected by a flight of stone steps led to the Pilot's residence. The site was chosen due to the uninterrupted views it provided for the Pilot to observe the arrival and departure of vessels at the Macleay River to the northwest and harbouring in Trial Bay to the east. These views were essential for the conduct of the Pilot service and rapid deployment of boat crews.

A signal station and flagstaff was built on the headland adjacent to the maritime buildings. This little building was fitted out with lockers for the flags and windows with copper flaps on three sides to act as rests for a telescope. When the crew were delayed by working on the bar or attending to the beacons in the river, their wives would light the beacon a short distance from the station. The first Pilot was Captain John Jamieson who had been in charge of the station at Grassy Head.

The wooden Pilot Launch "MV Macleay" was built and commissioned for service at the South West Rocks Pilot Station. This vessel was one of four pilot boats built to one design for the Maritime Services Board (the other pilot boats were "Camden", "Hastings" and "Nowra"). The "Macleay" was constructed by Holmes of Sydney. The keel was laid in 1935 and the vessel was commissioned into service in the same year. The "Macleay" replaced the launch "MV Ajax" which came into service in 1932 but was destroyed by fire on 21 September 1934. The boat was housed in a boat shed on the eastern bank of South West Rocks Creek where the concrete slab of the boat shed still remains. The "Macleay" serviced the Trial Bay area until the vessel was decommissioned in the 1960s. Some years later, the "Macleay" was found at Dora Creek, Lake Macquarie. With funding from a local businessman, Kempsey Shire Council purchased the "Macleay" and returned it to the Pilot Station complex where it is now situated under a covered shelter in the yard of Boatman's Cottage 2.

In 1991 the Macleay River Historical Society urged the community of South West Rocks to organise a working group to restore the boatman's cottage no1. Kempsey Shire council instigated a planning amendment enabling the listing of the Pilot station group of buildings at South West Rocks as items of environmental heritage on its LEP.

In 1992 the community of South West Rocks restored Boatman's Cottage No 1.

Subsequent representation secured the use of the land for essential heritage purposes and tourism. In 1998 Council obtained a grant of $24,000 under the NSW Department of Planning Heritage Assistance programme. The purpose of the grant was for the restoration of the cottage which formed part of the Pilot Station Group and which was in a state of disrepair at the time of application.

Council Operations department supervised the restoration, which was carried out by the community under the direction of Al Geronomi. The plan of restoration and construction was prepared by Messrs David Boram and Associates, Architects and Planners.

It was decided to use the cottage as a maritime museum and visitors' information centre. The opening was performed by His Excellency Rear Admiral Peter Sinclair AC, Governor of New South Wales, on 10 September 1993.

Boatman's Cottage 1 was used prior to 1990 by the Department of Agriculture and Fisheries.

Boatman's Cottage No. 2 was formerly used as a holiday cottage for staff of the Maritime Services Board. The cottage was later transferred from the office of Maritime Safety and Port Strategy (MSS) to the Department for Land and Water Conservation.

Boatman's Cottage No. 3 has been used as a police station since the closure of the Pilot Station.

== Description ==
The Pilot Station complex is located in an area known as the Horseshoe Bay Reserve on the southern side of Trial Bay. The Reserve is bordered by:

- South West Rocks Creek (Backwater Creek) to the west
- Trial Bay and Saltwater Creek to the north
- Arakoon State Recreation Area to the east and
- Fig Tree Lane, Livingstone Street, Memorial Avenue, Paragon Avenue, Mitchell and Landsborough Streets and Phillip Drive to the south.

Horseshoe Bay Reserve incorporates part of the Crown Land Reserve Number 82364 which is listed for Public Recreation. The Reserve is administered by the Department of Lands. Part of the Reserve includes a lease for the operation of the Caravan Park and sub lease for the operation of a Kiosk. Native Title was extinguished on the Reserve as of 22 May 1995.

Backwater Creek separates the South West Rocks township from the main entrance to the Macleay River which lies further to the west. To the north of the Pilot Station residences is the flagstaff on Point Briner. Laggers Point, a north-running extension of Smoky Cape, provides shelter from south-easterly winds and enabled the use of Trial Bay as a harbour. The main part of the township of Trial Bay lies to the southeast of the Pilot Station. A caravan park is situated to the west, north and east of the Pilot Station buildings.

The complex consists of the Pilot's residence, three of the four original cottages, the signal station and flagstaff at Point Briner, the steps leading to the old boat shed boat which housed the Pilot launch in the adjacent Back Creek, the wooden hulled Pilot launch "Macleay" and the vistas - north towards the entrance to the Macleay River and SE towards the Trial Bay harbour area.

The Pilot's residence and the three existing cottages are of timber construction with red tiled roofs. The red tiles, while not original, retain a feature which caused comment at the time of construction when they were described as "rather glaring". The floors are tallowwood and the linings are mahogany. The doors and windows are timber and timber framed. Brick chimney pots are intact.

The Pilot's residence was built with three bedrooms and the boatman's cottages had 2 bedrooms. The out buildings of the Pilot's residence are intact. The outbuildings include a "Rocket Shed", storeroom, another shed in the form of a garage, a yard shed, an outside toilet and an outside shower.

Boatman's Cottage 1 is currently used as a museum and Visitor Information Centre. The out buildings of this cottage are intact.

Boatman's Cottage 2 has been faithfully restored and is a fine example of the Pilot Station Group. The Boatman's Cottage No. 2 comprises a single storey three bedroom weather board residence constructed in approximately 1902. Significant features of the dwelling and curtilage include: 1) Lounge room with original fireplace/chimney; 2) Kitchen; 3) Bathroom; 4) Outside, attached laundry/toilet; 5) Front veranda enclosed; 6) Paling fence; 7) Steel mesh front fence; 8) Tile roofing. The cottage is currently used as a craft centre.

Cottage No. 3 has been used as a police station since 1932.

Cottage No. 4 was removed in 1968 to make way for a block of units.

The wooden signal house and 19m wooden flagstaff on Point Briner are intact. The small signal house, (2.4m x 3m and 3.2m in height,) was fitted with lockers for the flags and there were windows with copper flaps as rests for a telescope on three sides. A black ball would be hoisted on the yardarm to signify if the river bar was closed to shipping. Cones and balls could be used to signal the conditions on the bar, the depth of water and the weather. A set of international flags and Alidis lamps were on hand at all times. The flags are now in the possession of the South West Rocks Maritime Museum.

Concrete steps (1.15m wide and 7.4m in length) lead from the Pilot's Cottage to the site of the old boat shed are intact as is the concrete slab on which the boat shed was originally built. The shed and stepped access were built around 1902 in conjunction with the Pilot's residence.

Spatially, the complex retains its position and functional layout of various elements which provided convenient control of the movement of vessels in Trial Bay.

The wooden hulled Pilot Boat "MV Macleay" is 34 feet (10.4 m) overall, 28 feet (8.5 m) on the waterline and had a 9-foot (2.7 m) beam. The vessel was fitted with a Reynolds-Newbury (Manchester) diesel 20 hp engine and was self righting. The concrete slab of the boat shed where the Pilot boats were kept is still in situ on the eastern bank of South West Rocks Creek. In 2003 a shelter for the vessel, partially funded by a $10,000 Heritage Incentives Program grant, was constructed by Kempsey Shire Council. The shelter has stabilised the deterioration of the vessel which, although not seaworthy, is in fair condition.

=== Condition ===
All the cottages were reported to be in reasonable condition as at 24 May 2006. The Pilot cottage was in need of repair but was not derelict.

The grounds of the cottages have not been disturbed by redevelopment and retain potential for archaeological for evidence of the inhabitant's lifestyles and working methods during the active life of the complex.

The various components of this complex, including the vistas, substantially retain their original form and, therefore, evidence of their original function. Minor alterations, including the enclosure of the veranda of the Pilot's residence do not impact substantially on that integrity. The original function and authenticity of the complex is further emphasised by the presence of the "MV Macleay", a Pilot boat that was built specifically for the South West Rocks Pilot Station and which was serving at the Pilot Station when it closed in the 1960s.

The profile of the adjacent caravan park has minimum impact on the vistas.

The main visual intrusion of the site arises from the residential building erected on the site of Boatman's Cottage No. 4. However, this does not impede the key vistas to the entrance of the Macleay River, to Trial Bay Harbour to the south east or the vistas directly east of the Pilot's residence.

=== Modifications and dates ===
The whole group was built during the original construction in 1902. The Pilot cottage had an open veranda. The enclosure of the veranda has timber-framed windows which is a sympathetic addition probably about 1910. A small addition at the side was approved by the Department of Navigation in 1905 to house a post office.

The flagstaff and flag locker were integral parts of the Pilot Station. After restoration of the boatman's cottage No.1 in 1997, the flagstaff was lowered, repainted and re-erected securely. The locker was painted and re-roofed by volunteers of the newly formed South West Rocks branch of the Macleay River Historical Society. Since 2001 the fence has been mended and painted.

== Heritage listing ==
The Pilot Station complex at South West Rocks is of State significance in demonstrating the importance of the shipping trade along the east coast of New South Wales and the central role of Pilot Stations in maintaining those routes. While the "highway of lighthouses" assisted ship's captains to navigate past headlands and coastal shoals, the Pilot service was essential to safe passage entering and leaving port. Substantially intact, the South West Rocks Station and associated vistas are a strong representation of an in-situ maritime precinct and the role of these facilities in providing safe passage. Of a total of 21 Pilot Stations established in New South Wales, most have been demolished, had their buildings relocated or retain only a small portion of the original facility. Only at Kiama is there an in-situ Pilot's residence and a comparable associated complex. The South West Rocks Pilot Station therefore possesses significant potential for the study of the management of coastal shipping and navigation in this State.

South West Rocks Pilot Station Complex was listed on the New South Wales State Heritage Register on 2 June 2008 having satisfied the following criteria.

The place is important in demonstrating the course, or pattern, of cultural or natural history in New South Wales.

The South West Rocks Pilot Station precinct is of State significance as evidence of the importance of the development of patterns of coastal shipping to the New South Wales economy and the crucial role of navigational services in providing safe passage. The success of coastal shipping was central to servicing the centralised commercial needs of Sydney as well as regional communities and economies before the spread of rail and road links. Pilot stations were as essential to the safety of shipping arrivals and departures at coastal ports as lighthouses were to passage between ports.

The Pilot Station was relocated from its original site at Grassy Head, a few kilometres to the north, following an 1895 decision to stabilise the mouth of the Macleay River. This relocation is therefore associated with the late 19th century State Government investment in high cost port infrastructure at relatively minor ports such as the Macleay River, Coffs Harbour and the Manning River. The costsof these projects lead to the eventual retreat from investment in coastal trade, prioritisation of rail infrastructure and the demise of the Pilot Service at minor ports.

The place is important in demonstrating aesthetic characteristics and/or a high degree of creative or technical achievement in New South Wales.

The South West Rocks Pilot Station and associated vistas are of local significance as a distinctive aspect of South West Rocks landscape/seascape interaction. With the sea as a background, the buildings provide a positive and sensory connection to the history and life-style at South West Rocks in the early 20th century. The presence of the diesel Pilot boat "MV Macleay", on display in the yard of Boatman's Cottage No.1, a vessel which served at this Pilot Station, provides a level of visual coherence in interpreting the function of this facility the is unmatched in this State. The design of the Pilot boat, the buildings and associated structures exemplifies the style and technology of the Pilot Service at that time.

The place has strong or special association with a particular community or cultural group in New South Wales for social, cultural or spiritual reasons.

The social value of the Pilot Station complex to the local communities at South West Rocks and the lower Macleay River is evidenced by the site being listed on the Kempsey Shire Council Local Environment Plan, the submission of a nomination for listing on the State Heritage Register and an ongoing community campaign for appropriate management of the various components of the site. This includes community working groups and successful submissions by Kempsey Council for Department of Planning Heritage Assistance Program funding to maintain the cottages and Pilot boat "Macleay".

The place has potential to yield information that will contribute to an understanding of the cultural or natural history of New South Wales.

The South West Rocks Pilot Station precinct is of State significance for its potential for archaeological research and comparative study with the sites of other less intact pilot stations on the New South Wales coast to better understand the everyday functioning of the stations and working of the Pilots and boatmen.

The place possesses uncommon, rare or endangered aspects of the cultural or natural history of New South Wales.

The South West Rocks Pilot Station precinct is of State significance for its rarity. Twenty-one pilotstation facilities once operated along the New South Wales coast. Most of these have been completely or partially demolished and many of were much smaller than the South West Rocks complex. The only comparable station still in situ and with the original buildings substantially intact is the Kiama Pilot Station. The South West Rocks complex is therefore one of only two, substantially intact pilot station complexes surviving in New South Wales - one north and one south of Sydney.

The place is important in demonstrating the principal characteristics of a class of cultural or natural places/environments in New South Wales.

The South West Rocks Pilot Station complex and associated vistas are of State significance as an example of the facilities that were once in place along the length of New South Wales coast from the Queensland border to Twofold Bay in the late 19th and early 20th centuries. As one of only two substantially intact facilities in New South Wales, the site is representative of the 21 such facilities that were once an integral part of coastal navigation services. The complex includes the principle characteristics of these facilities - Pilot's and boatman's residences, flagstaff and flag locker for signalling to ships, access to the Pilot boat and boatshed, the Pilot boat itself and views of the key approaches to the port or harbour.
