= Trial Bay Gaol =

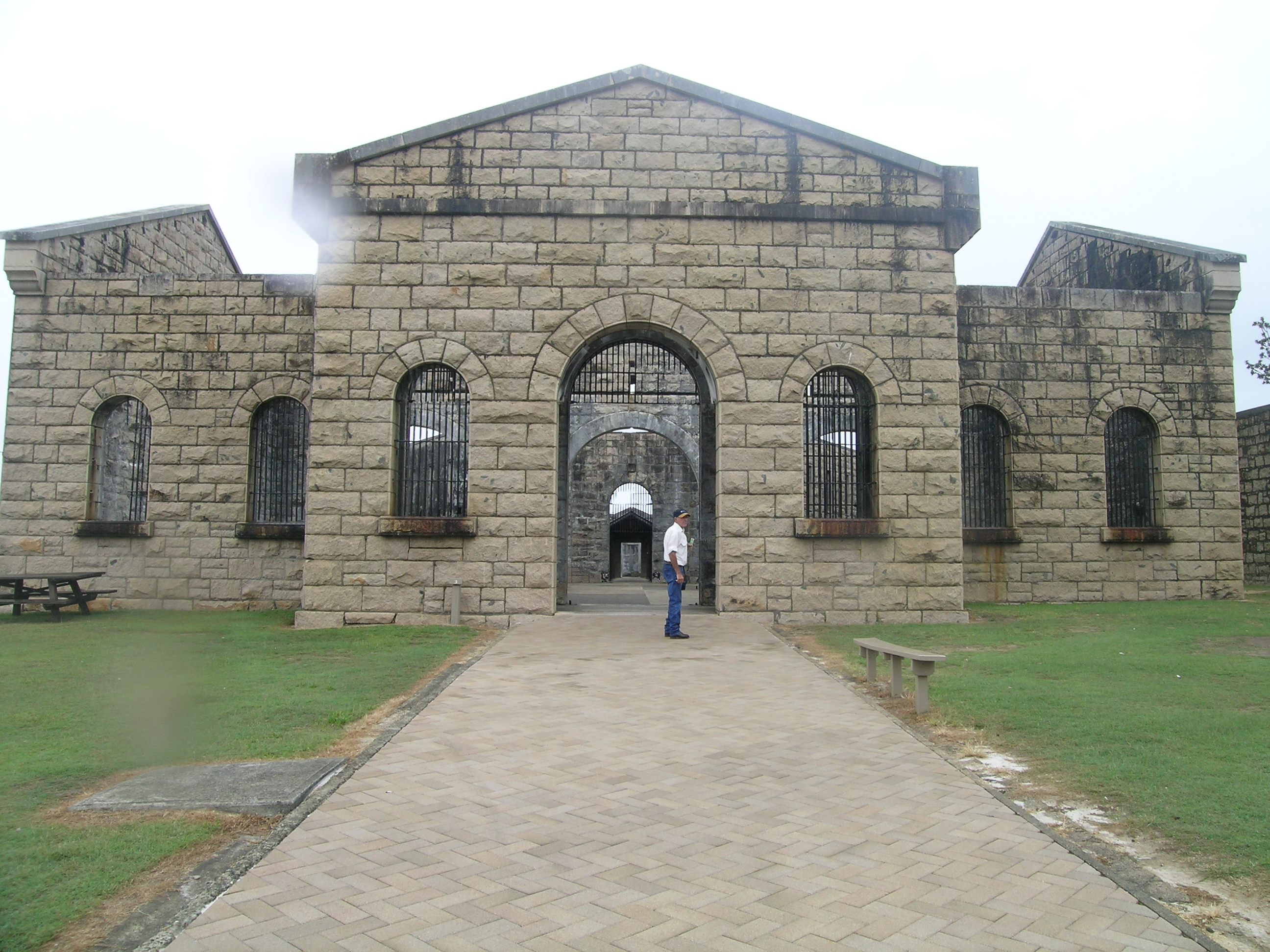

- Location within New South Wales Location within Australia
- 30.877175°S 153.070252°E
- Location: Cardwell Street, Arakoon, Kempsey Shire, New South Wales, Australia

Site notes
- Owner: Violet Winter.

New South Wales Heritage Register
- Official name: Trial Bay Gaol, Breakwater and Environs; Trial Bay Jail
- Type: state heritage (complex/group)
- Designated: 14 May 2010
- Reference no.: 1825
- Type: Gaol/Lock-up
- Category: Law Enforcement

Trial Bay Gaol is a heritage-listed former public works prison and internment camp at Cardwell Street, Arakoon, Kempsey Shire, New South Wales, Australia.

The property is owned and operated by the NSW National Parks and Wildlife Service. It was added to the New South Wales State Heritage Register on 14 May 2010.

== History ==
=== Colonisation of Trial Bay ===
Before European settlement in Australia the land now known as Arakoon National Park where Trial Bay Gaol is located was associated with the Dunghutti people who lived and moved through the Macleay Valley following the seasonal supply of food resources. The Macleay River, South West Rocks Creek, Salt Water Creek and the ocean would have supplied the indigenous people with fish and shell fish and the dunes in the area may have been a source of edible plants. Other plants found in the area such as cabbage palm, towwack and fern roots may have made the area around Trial Bay Gaol attractive to the pre-contact Dunghatti people.

Arakoon National Park would have also been frequented by Aboriginal people to maintain their cultural lives as the area is near the Smokey Cape Area which is closely associated with sacred beings such as Ulitarra important in the north coast Aboriginal creation stories. A site of spiritual significance to the local Aboriginal people is located near Trial Bay Gaol and another in nearby South West Rocks would have been a focus of ritual activity for the Dunghatti people.

One of the earliest contacts between the European settlers and the local Aboriginal people is reported to have occurred when the brig "Trial" was shipwrecked at what became known as Trial Bay in 1816. This ship, owned by Simeon Lord, had been hijacked by a number of convicts in Port Jackson who, in a bid for their freedom, forced the crew to set sail north up the coast. There was no news of the ship's progress until word of a shipwreck on the coast above Port Stephens was relayed to the Europeans by Aboriginal people. There were a number of survivors from the wreck who subsequently lost their lives attempting to sail or trek back to a settled area. It was reported that one female convict went to live with an Aboriginal man and had two children by him.

European settlement in the area began to accelerate after 1836 and the impact of this on the Dunghutti community was marked by the dispossession of them from their lands and thus their means of survival. By the 1860s many local Aboriginal people depended on government rations or rations from the settlers who had taken their land, often providing labour for the farms in return for rations. During the 1870s and 1880s moves were made to establish Reserves on which Aboriginal people should live and in the Macleay Valley such sites were located at Pelican, Shark, Kinchela and Fattorini Islands and at Euroka Creek. The initial step forwarded afforded by allocating Aboriginal people land was eroded through the implementation of the Aborigines Protection Board Act in 1909 which enabled the Board to remove children from their families and invested the power over Aboriginal peoples earnings to the Reserve Manager. All earnings from the land and other sources was turned over to the board in exchange for the provision of rations. Many people at this stage moved off the Reserves to camps and in 1925 the Reserves in the lower Macleay Valley were revoked.

In the course of his exploration of the north coast of the NSW colony, John Oxley noted Trial Bay as a sheltered bay and the area was soon noted as a safe haven for shipping travelling between Port Stephens and Moreton Bay. While it provided shelter during south-easterly gales, however, it offered no protection when the gale-force winds were easterly or north-easterly. To remedy this, Engineer in Chief for Harbours and Rivers, Edward Orpen Moriarty began to formulate a plan to construct a breakwater and safe harbour at Trial Bay in 1861. By 1866 the plan was considered by the NSW Parliament and finally, in 1877, a sum of money amounting to 10,000 pounds was set aside for the construction of the breakwater and also a gaol to house the prisoner labour force that would be assigned to the project.

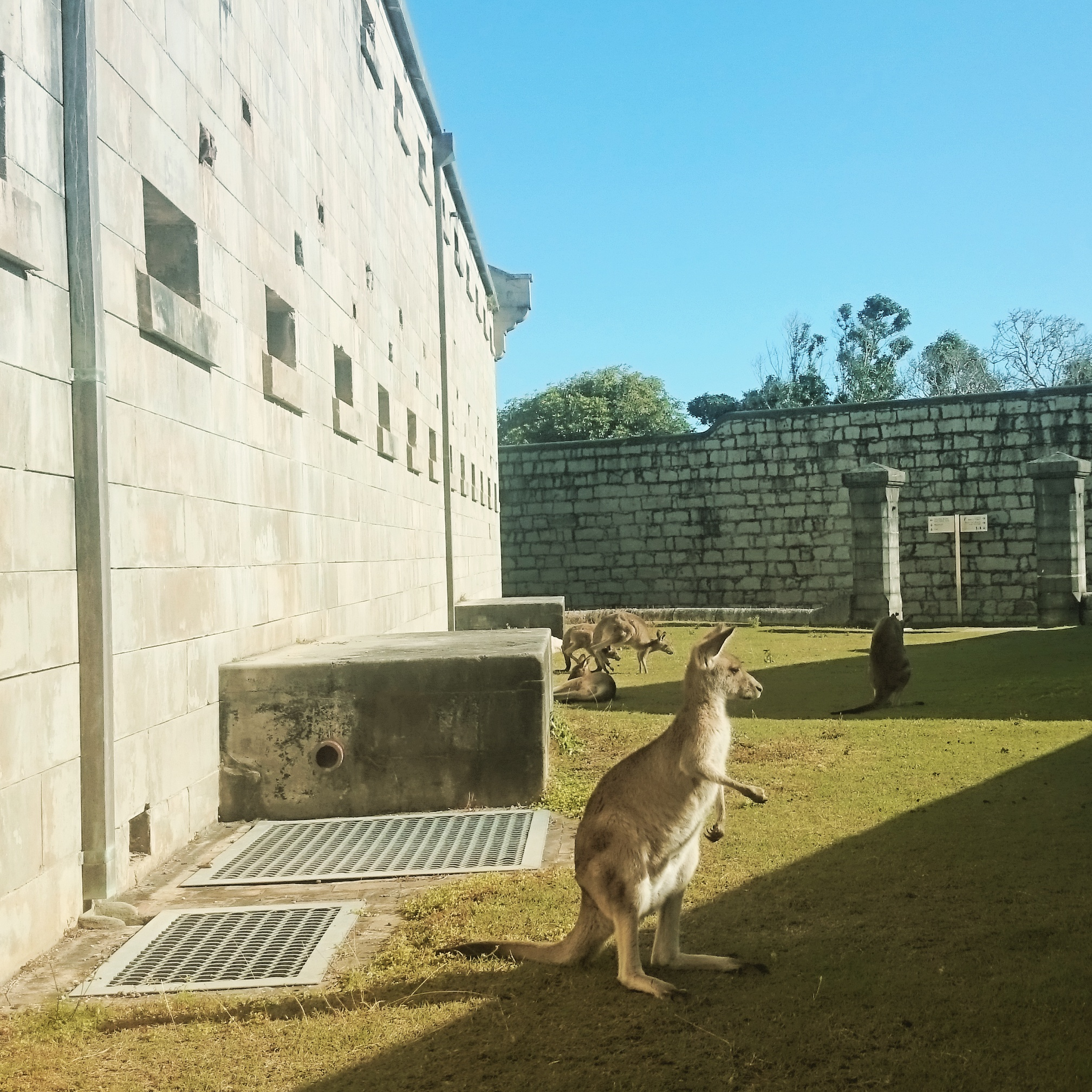
Wallabies grazing on the grounds of the gaol

=== Gaol ===
The design and construction of Trial Bay Gaol was carried out under the supervision of Sheriff Harold Maclean, a proponent of penal reform who advocated a number of principles of prison reform including the provision of substantial masonry accommodation rather than cheaply constructed barracks and reducing the spread of bad influence and ideas within the prison population through housing prisoners in individual cells. He was also a believer in the modern British penal model where long-term prisoners, reaching the last years of their sentence, were employed in the construction of public works projects. Here they could learn skills useful for future employment and enjoy new privileges and freedoms as they approached the time of their release from prison.

Construction of the gaol began in 1877 but was delayed on a number of occasions due to shortfalls in finance. By 1882 one cell block providing single-cell accommodation for only 64 of the 128 prisoners was completed. Temporary wooden barracks were used to accommodate the other half of the prisoners. A Mess Hall and adjoining kitchen and a hospital had also been constructed over these years. By 1884 the perimeter walls and watch towers, Gate House, Silent Cells and supplementary structures were established. Another period of construction of the gaol occurred between 1899 - 1900 when the final kitchen, scullery and bake house, cell block B, lavatories, shelter sheds, salt water storage, telephone communications and electric lighting system were installed. The last period of construction occurred during World War I when the gaol was used to accommodate German Internees.

Work constructing the Breakwater began in 1889 after the initial stages of the gaol were constructed. Granite for the Breakwater was cut from the quarry and transported to the breakwater site by steam crane and horse tramway. The prisoners were supervised by a senior warder and 14 warders who were accommodated on site along with the prison Governor, a resident surgeon, two chaplains and Department of Public Works employees such as the Supervising Engineer for the Breakwater project.

The majority of prisoners at Trial Bay, 111 out of 124, were categorised as Licensees and they had the freedom to fish, swim or play sport when not working. They could grow beards and were not obliged to wear prison uniform. They were paid a wage which was credited to their bank accounts and enjoyed a standard length work week of 36.5 hours. Under supervision, they learned the various skills required for the work.

This relatively benevolent treatment regimen was dismantled soon after the start of the Breakwater's construction following the death of Sheriff Maclean. Maclean was replaced in 1890 by George Miller as Comptroller General of Prisons. Under Miller, wages were reduced, stern discipline reintroduced and working hours lengthened. The ideal of one cell per prisoner was also discarded and shared accommodation (2 inmates per cell) became the norm. In 1895 the position as Comptroller General of Prisons was taken up by Captain Frederick Neitenstein who was a supporter of the idea of separation of prisoners and reinstigated the idea of a single cells for each prisoner.

While the Justice Department administered the business of the prison and prisoners, the Harbours and Rivers Department was in charge of the breakwater's construction until 1898. In 1898 the Prisons Department took on the administration of both the breakwater and prison. Progress on the construction of the breakwater was constantly hampered over the years due to the work being washed away in storms. By 1903 the breakwater had reached less than 20% of its planned finished length at a huge cost of 67,000 pounds. The cost plus other factors (including the silting of the harbour caused by the construction of the breakwater, the establishment of a serviceable overland system of transportation along the coast and the improvement in sea-going transport) led the Department of Public Works to abandon the breakwater project in 1903. Shortly after, the prison was closed. The houses and buildings were sold off and removed to various places around the district including the new Pilot Station at South West Rocks.

=== Internment camp ===
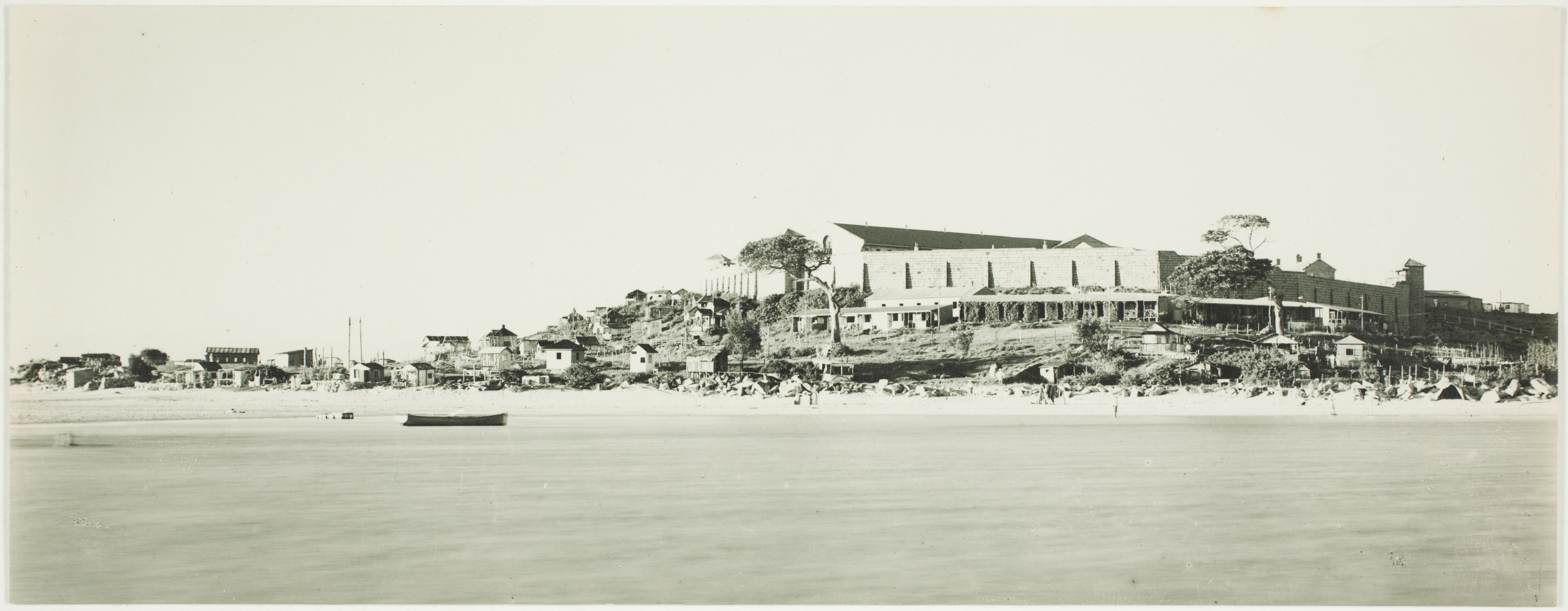
Internment camp on the beach, Trial Bay, New South Wales, 1918

The gaol remained unused until 1915 when it was commandeered by the Department of Defence for use as an internment camp for German Prisoners and resident "enemy aliens" interned for the duration of World War I. This was initially under the command of Major Sands. Other German internment camps in NSW and the ACT were located at Berrima on the South Coast of NSW, Bourke in the west of this State, Molonglo in the ACT and the major camp at Holsworthy in south-west Sydney. The camp at Trial Bay was used to intern Germans of social standing, often prominent businessmen and professionals. Two prominent figures among the internees were two German Scientists attending the Congress of the British Association for the Advancement of Science at the request of the Australian Government. Unfortunately for Professors Pringsheim and Grabner, war broke out during the Congress proceedings and they were interned as "enemy aliens". German Naval Officers and elite German residents of neighbouring British Commonwealth countries in the Pacific and South East Asia were also interned at the gaol. Trial Bay was the only internment camp to house internees from overseas.

The internment camp received its first internees on 1 August 1915 after they had marched to South West Rocks from their disembarkation point at Jerseyville. First accommodated in tents set up within the perimeter walls of the gaol, the internees were put to work constructing furniture and cleaning and maintaining the cells at the gaol which eventually accommodated most of the internees. Officers and Consuls interned at Trial Bay were accommodated in temporary timber barracks located within the perimeter walls and in 1916 they were given newly constructed barracks outside the walls of the gaol.

The structure of an internee's day while confined at Trial Bay Gaol and the other camps was defined initially by a royal warrant, a British code of instructions, in August 1914 and was later superseded by the Australian "Rules for the Custody of and Maintenance of Discipline among Prisoners of War in NSW". This document noted the schedule for mandatory activities such as the twice daily roll call, meal times, times of rising and retiring for sleep.

The "Rules" also lay out that the "general welfare" of the camp was to be looked after by an elected internee Camp Committee which was the conduit of communication between the internees and the Camp commandant. The committee had a number of subcommittees set up to facilitate different aspects of camp life. One committee was the Education and Lectures committee which organised an impressive array of courses in languages, accounting, mathematics, engineering and navigation, among other things. Another subcommittee managed the library, and others the theatre, orchestra, kitchen and other services.

Despite being confined to the gaol surrounds and the structure of each day being prescribed by a set of rules, the internees were relatively free to move within the borders of the gaol during daylight hours and under the eye of guards located in the four watchtowers of the gaol. Swimming and fishing in the beautiful waters surrounding Trial Bay Gaol and playing tennis at one of the three internee established tennis courts were among the leisure pastimes of the internees. There were opportunities to participate in work activities either in internee established private businesses such as providing welding, shoemaking or furniture building services, camp functions such as cooking, gardening, cleaning and sanitation or government work projects such as land clearing. About a third of the internees were involved in such activities.

Food was prepared and eaten in the Kitchen and Mess Hall wings of the gaol. The internees food ration included a quantity of meat bread, milk, vegetables, rice and other food staples which was supplemented by fruit and vegetables grown in the camp grounds by the internees. A canteen also offered other foods which and the Trial Bay Gaol camp boasted a gourmet quality restaurant named "The Duck Coup" and a more bohemian establishment "The Artists Den", a cafe established on the beach which was noted as the centre of social life for the camp.

While interned at Trial Bay the internees established various clubs and activities to reduce the negative impacts of their confinement. Aside from the athletics, boxing, bowling and chess clubs there was a newspaper (at first published bi-weekly and then weekly) which contained editorial on world events, especially the progress of the war in Europe as well as information on the camp activities. A thriving theatre company kept the internees entertained with performances of a new play each week. Members of the theatre troupe made all the necessary stage sets and costumes and between 1915 and 1918 had accumulated a respectable repertoire of performances and infrastructure necessary to stage them. There was also an orchestra which was very popular. Fischer et al. note that the theatre and orchestra was particularly strong on the performance of German literary and musical works and this entertainment served to reinforce the internees perception of themselves as culturally superior to the Australian people.

The attitude of the internees vis a vis their Australian surroundings offered the exact opposite of this process of identification with and idealisation of, German culture, which found its quintessential expression in the duplication of a cultural life with all its public institutions such as theatre, orchestra, newspaper festivals, educational establishments sporting and professional activities."

— Fisher G and Helmi N. 2005. Internment at Trial Bay During WWI

The internment camp at Trial Bay Gaol closed in July 1918 and all internees were taken to Holsworthy Internment Camp. Prior to their departure, the Germans requested that they be able to erect a memorial to five fellow internees who died while confined at the Trial Bay Gaol Internment Camp. A stone cairn was erected on the crest of what is now known as Monument Hill where two of the five deceased Germans were buried. Shortly after the German internees had been transferred, the monument was destroyed. In 1959 it was restored with funds and assistance from the West German Government, Macleay Shire Council and the Kempsey Rotary Club.

=== Reserve ===
Once the gaol was left vacant work began to strip the gaol buildings of moveable fittings and these and the timber barracks and other buildings were auctioned. In 1922 all interior fittings, roofs and gates were dismantled and sold off. After this the gaol began to deteriorate and began its time as an iconic ruin, the focus of much attention from tourists and campers who since the demise of the gaol have frequented the old gaol site.

Even before its immediate surrounds became accessible, the views of the remote and imposing prison building and breakwater were of interest to those visiting the area. The steady increase in visitation led to the area being declared a Reserve for Public Recreation in 1946 and in 1965 the Trial Bay Gaol Trust was established to manage the ruins. In 1974 this function was taken over by the Arakoon State Recreation Area Trust and in 1987 by the National Parks and Wildlife Service.

== Description ==
Trial Bay Gaol is located on the rocky headland, Laggers Point, Arakoon on the southern edge of Trial Bay, near the towns of Arakoon and South West Rocks. It is part of Arakoon National Park (previously known as Arakoon State Conservation Area and, before 2003, as Arakoon State Recreation Area). The curtilage boundary for the listing comprises two parcels of land that contain significant infrastructure features, gaol ruins, archaeology, memorials, graves and landscape features.

The larger of these parcels is located on the north-facing headland and contains the historic gaol ruins, the remains of the breakwater, the breakwater quarry and numerous archaeological sites relating to the accommodation of gaol staff and other workshops and infrastructure relating to the period prior to 1900 as well as a memorial and grave sites relating to the internment of Germans during WWI. This site was chosen to establish the gaol as it was relatively easy to guard and the listing curtilage for this parcel of land coincides with the 1886 gazetted boundary of the gaol. The second, smaller parcel contains an overshoot dam and infrastructure relating to the provision of freshwater to the prison during its 19th century and WWI uses.

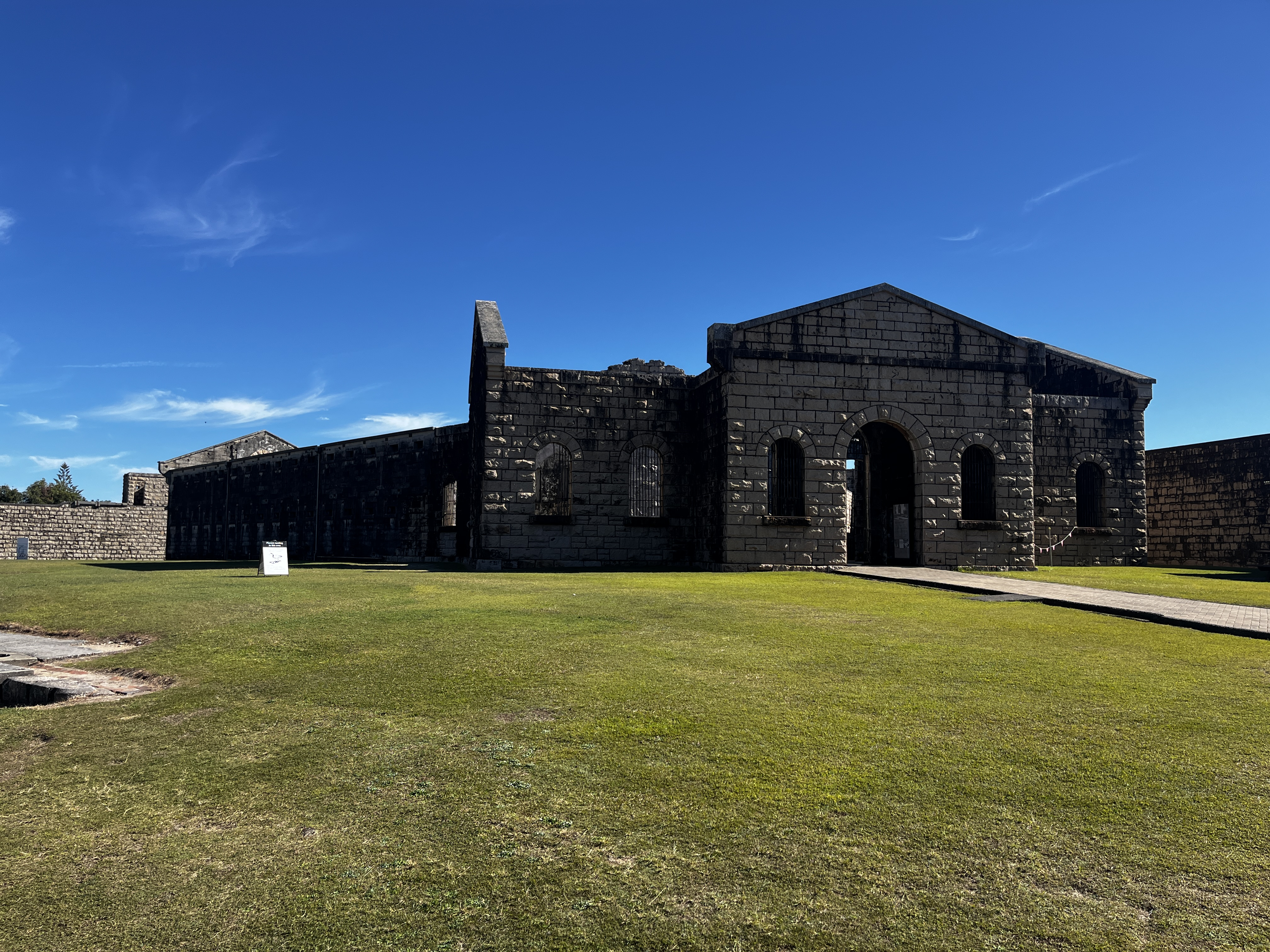
An internal view of Trail Bay Gaol, July 2025

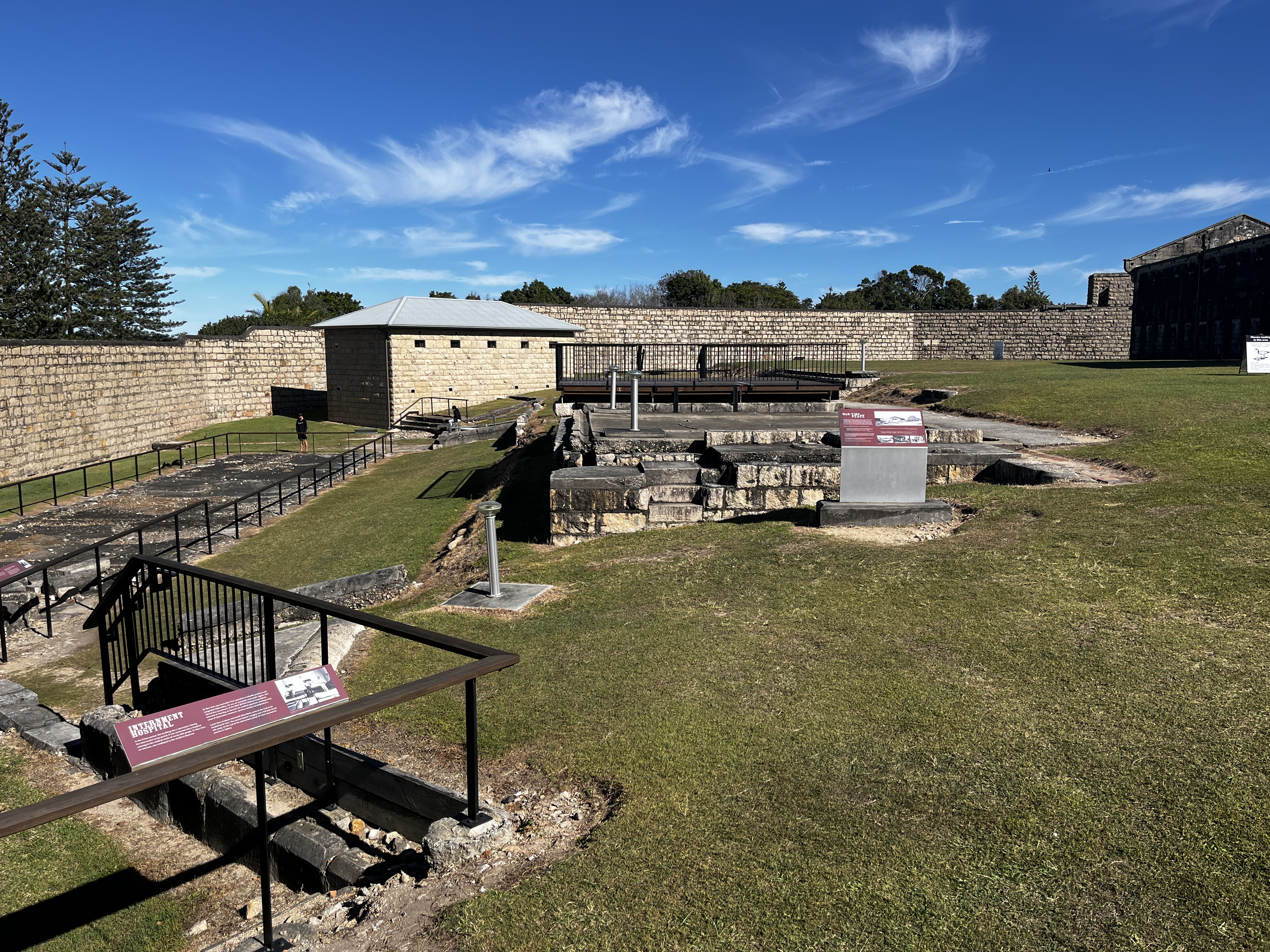
A view of the ruins of the internment hospital, bathhouse and kitchen, July 2025

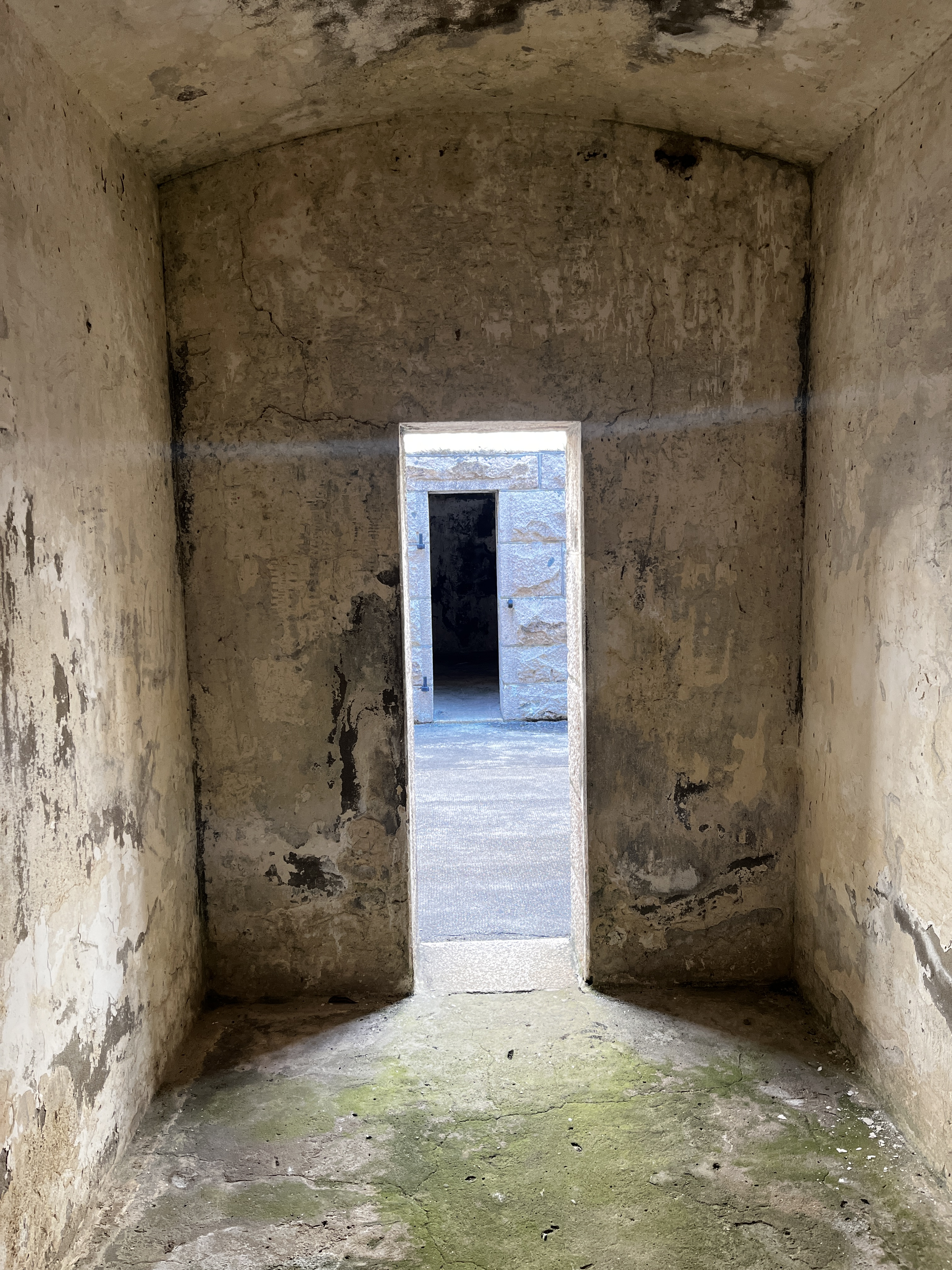
An internal view of a cell at the public works prison, July 2025

=== Gaol ruins ===
The ruins of the gaol comprise the original perimeter walls constructed of coursed granite rubble and featuring regular external one or two stage buttresses with diagonal buttresses at the corners. There are 4 square watchtowers which were added after the completion of the walls. In the eastern side of the perimeter wall is a gatehouse and entry. The entry was arched with guard houses on the left and right of the entry with rooms above. Some elements of the telephone system installed at one time remain. This area is currently used as the by NPWS as the tourism entry area, offices and museum.

Inside the perimeter walls the central building in the complex is the remains of the mess hall. This structure has a seven bay facade of fine jointed granite masonry. The pediment and gable ends are supported on moulded corbels. The structure is no longer roofed as the original timber roof was sold off in the 1920s. Three large arches in the rear wall gave access to the two cell blocks and the kitchen.

Cell block A runs to the north west of the rear of the mess hall. It is a two-storey granite structure containing prisoner accommodation - originally intended to provide accommodation for one prisoner per cell. During WWI the German internees undertook to improve the internal finishes of the cell blocks and remnants of decorative friezes and dados are still in evidence in some of the cells. The structure is currently unroofed exposing the top storey to the elements.

Cell Block B was constructed between 1899 and 1900 and runs southwest from the rear of the mess hall. It is constructed in concrete block that has been plastered and lined out in an ashlar masonry pattern. The roof and stairs and sundry other ironwork was sold off in the 1920s.

Running between the Cell Blocks A and B, south from the rear of the mess hall stand the remains of a three-room structure which was the Kitchen scullery and bakehouse which was constructed in 1899 - 1900. The kitchen still contains the remains of four boilers and a huge fuel range stove. The drainage and fittings are still located in the scullery and the oven is mainly intact in the bakehouse. Like the other structures still standing this building is not roofed, although a protective modern roof has been added.

A set of five cells constructed of coursed granite walls with segmental vault ceilings originally covered by an earthed and later a hipped tiled roof were located south of the mess hall and just inside the perimeter wall. These silent cells were used as isolation cells for punishment. They featured a ventilation system designed to prevent intercell communication. They also had a signalling device to be used to catch the notice of a warder in emergency situations.

Most of the drainage system at the prison is still intact.

The granite and concrete cell blocks replaced the original temporary timber cell blocks that were situated inside the perimeter walls. Other early structures that no longer stand but in some cases footing and other evidence remains include the first kitchen and ablution block, three hospital buildings, blacksmiths shop, carpenters shop, two lots of toilets, shelter sheds iron rail and dwarf wall fence, water tanks and salt water storage tanks.

=== Sites exterior to the gaol perimeter walls on Laggers Point ===
A large number of residences and cottages, workshops and other buildings relating to the operation of the gaol in the 19th century and WWI uses of the site were located around the gaol. Most of the buildings have been removed but there are traces of these sites such as levelled building ground, drainage, brick rubble that remain in a number of cases. In some cases the levelled sites have been reused for the establishment of barbeques and other facilities. The extent of the area containing such potential archaeology runs down through the current camp site to the south and south west and to the east, north and west edges of the headland. Below are listed sites associated with the prison operation lying outside the gaol walls

- Chief Engineer's residence - due west of prison wall - no visible remains
- Governors Residence-.located south of the prison - crushed brick visible on northern boundary of tennis court
- Chief Warders Quarters - located just north of the main entrance - WC remains at base of watch tower
- General Warders Quarters and store - located near main entry - Fragments of building remain on site - concrete floor of store remains and tank stand
- Married men's quarters - located southeast of the prison - removed in prior to 1903 - later site of electricity generation equipment associated with the WWI uses of the site - fragments of various structures including drainage remain
- Blacksmith's Quarters - located south west of the prison - no visible evidence remains
- Warders cottages - located on 3 levelled sites to the south of the prison - remains of a concrete slab still in situ at the three sites as well as a levelled terrace with uphill retaining wall and batter bank down hill.
- Assistant Engineer's cottage - located north of current kiosk - dressed granite and brick remains visible - now used to house a barbeque unit
- Surgeons quarters - located on a terrace where the kiosk now stands
- Stables and cart shed - located below the southwest watch tower - concrete floor or footing remnants on the large levelled terrace
- Harbours and Rivers Office - located south of the prison near lagoon - terrace still visible
- Harbours and Rivers Store - located east of the steps to the quarry - terrace still visible
- Boat Shed - located to the south of the prison - remnant iron work visible - now a picnic area
- Sawmill, carpenter and paint shed - located just below the main entry road - levelled terrace remains and is used to locate a barbeque unity
- Morgue - located off the north corner of the prison wall overlooking the breakwater - levelled terrace remains
- Gasoline House located above the quarry - no visible evidence
- Gallon Underground Tank - located outside the main entrance - the masonry tank still in situ
- Main Drain - runs from the south side of prison wall to an outfall once located on Front Beach - line is intact
- Foreman's Quarters - due east of prison outline of levelled terrace still visible
- Unmarried Foreman's House located south of the prison near Harbour and Rivers Office - remains of fireplace and chimney
- Steps to Unmarried Warders Quarters - located below eastern Watchtower - in situ
- Steps to Quarry - 80 metres east of main entrance - in situ
- Saltwater Supply - located above Front Beach - no visible evidence
- Six Inch Sewer - from prison to sea NE of prison - line partly remnant
- 10 Unmarried Warders Cottages- located on the east side of Cardwell St, Arakoon - no visible remains
- Graves on Monument Hill and German Monument - located on hill overlooking prison - monument to 5 German Internees who died at the prison is in form of a granite obelisk surrounded by a cross. Erected on the gravesite. Destroyed in 1919 and re-erected in 1960, although one layer is missing as blocks were too damaged.
- Prison Burial Grounds - located in a sandy hollow to the south of the prison- no visible evidence
- Well - constructed during the German internment period and located on eastern side access road at the crossing of the Creek - extant
- Footbridge adjacent to new road between the prison and kiosk - new bridge in original location
- historic roads and tracks

=== Breakwater and associated sites ===
- Breakwater located on Laggers Point tip extending to the north east - 100 metres of the original 300 metres extant
- Wharf located adjacent to the breakwater - stumps of piles only remain
- Prison Quarry 150 metres east of the main prison entrance - no longer in evidence
- Breakwater Quarry - along the shore to the north and east of the prison - has subsumed the Prison quarry. Site of horse stable and blacksmith shop during breakwater construction and of three tennis courts during the German Internment period. Also contains remains of rail for quarry and wagons
- Powder Magazine No. 1 - on hill behind kiosk - demolished.
- Powder Magazine No 2. 70 metres south of Powder Magazine 1. Still stands.
- Footings of timekeepers Office - located adjacent to weighbridge at junction of land and breakwater
- Remains of weighbridge - located at the junction of land and breakwater.

=== Little Bay and Dam ===
- Overshoot dam and Pipeline - 1500 metres east south east of the prison entrance above Little Bay - original construction visible behind the new concrete dam wall
- Police Paddock - located behind Little Bay Beach
- stone abutments of Parkes St Bridge - located on the eastern side of the creek at the Bridge
- Brick Pit - located on private land 200 metres past the turn off to Gap Beach

=== Moveable heritage ===
The gaol's moveable heritage collection contains a large number of historic photographs manuscripts, drawings and other artefacts relating to the site during its phase as a public works prison, the WWI German Internment camp and the later phase of recreational use.

== Heritage listing ==
Trial Bay Gaol, breakwater and environs is of State heritage significance for its place in the development several aspects of the history and evolution of NSW. The gaol, designed and constructed under the auspices of penal reformer, Harold Maclean between 1877 and 1900, is a unique example of his ideas for prison reform and the evolution of the penal system in NSW. The construction of the breakwater at Laggers Point to provide a safe haven for wind powered shipping on the NSW coast is evidence of a significant phase in coast shipping and the development of maritime infrastructure along the North Coast of NSW. The historical significance of the place was further developed through the gaol's significant usage as one of only five internment camps for Germans in NSW during WWI.

The gaol's State heritage significance is enhanced through its historic association two figures important to the historical development of NSW; Comptroller of Prisons Harold Maclean who was a noted penal reformer and also Edmund Orpen Moriarty, Engineer in Chief of the Harbours and Rivers proponent and designer of the breakwater and an important figure in the development of water and maritime infrastructure in the later 19th century.

Significant contemporary social/community associations with the site include the ongoing association of the Thungutti people living throughout the State and the former German internees interned at the gaol during WWI and their families.

The gaol's technical significance and rarity lies in its layout, design and construction. The high perimeter walls, entry gates, pair of cell blocks is a unique demonstration of the principle tenets of "enlightened" nineteenth century prison design in NSW. The gaol, sited as it is, high on the peninsular above Trial Bay is aesthetically distinctive and has significant landmark qualities as a ruin which are unique throughout the State.

Trial Bay Gaol is a rare example of a large scale gaol constructed in NSW in a remote location for the purpose of carrying out a public work, the construction of Trial Bay Breakwater, a rare and ambitious project in itself. The gaol contains the only example of a double storey cell block constructed in precast mass concrete block in NSW.

The use of the gaol and environs as a German internment camp during WWI contributes to the rarity values of the site as it was one of only five such camps in NSW and the only one of these to house Germans of high social standing in the business and professional and political arenas. It was also the only internment camp to house internees from other colonial outposts.

The gaol and breakwater provide a unique research opportunity for the study of Victorian engineering works and construction. The impact the breakwater has had on the bay similarly provides a rare insight into the effects of human intervention on the landscape.

The significant potential archaeological resource at Trial Bay Gaol may provide a valuable insight into the construction, use and evolution of the goal and breakwater and later internment camp, the life of former inmates, internees and visitors. The archaeology on site has the potential to contribute to knowledge of a wider complex of penal and correctional institutions in NSW.

Trial Bay Goal was listed on the New South Wales State Heritage Register on 14 May 2010 having satisfied the following criteria.

The place is important in demonstrating the course, or pattern, of cultural or natural history in New South Wales.

Trial Bay Gaol, breakwater and environs is of State heritage significance for its place in the development of the penal service in NSW during the 19th century. Designed and constructed under the auspices of penal reformer, Sherriff Harold Maclean between 1877 and 1900, it is a unique example of his ideas for prison reform including the provision of substantial masonry accommodation rather than cheaply constructed shared barracks, the isolation of prisoners from each other (and hence bad influence and ideas) by the provision of a cell per prisoner. He was also a believer in the modern British penal model where categories of prisoners were separated from each other and most specifically where long term prisoners reaching the last years of their sentence, were employed in the construction of public works projects. Here they could learn skills useful for future employment and enjoy new privileges and freedoms as they approached the time of their release from prison.

The construction of the breakwater at Laggers Point is evidence of a significant phase in coast shipping along the North Coast of NSW. In the early years of the colony with transportation of goods and people up and down the coast of NSW dependent on wind power, the need for a safe haven on the trip between Port Stephens and Moreton Bay was widely recognised. While Trial Bay, halfway between these two ports was an ideal location for such a haven it proved not to be sheltered in all weathers and so the need for a breakwater was seen as essential to providing refuge for shipping along the north coast. The eventual abandonment of construction in 1903 coincides with advances in shipping technology and other transportation modes in NSW which made such a refuge unnecessary.

The place has a strong or special association with a person, or group of persons, of importance of cultural or natural history of New South Wales's history.

Trial Bay Gaol is of State Heritage significance for its association with two prominent colonial public servants one of whom helped to shape the nature of the penal system in NSW and the other being involved in the development of significant harbour infrastructure which enabled the economic development of the State.

Comptroller of Prisons Harold Maclean was a reformer who promoted and at Trial Bay Gaol instigated NSW first Public Works prison and oversaw its design along principles which endeavoured to ameliorate the circulation of bad influences between prisoners and rehabilitate prisoners ready for life after their prison sentence.

Edmund Orpen Moriarty was engineer in chief of the Harbours and Rivers Navigation Branch. Besides designing and promoting the construction of Trial Bay breakwater was associated with numerous strategic and significant maritime and other public works important to the development of the colony. Examples of works developed under his leadership are the development of water supply schemes for Wollongong, Bathurst, Wagga Wagga, Albury and Hunter Valley towns, the outer Wollongong Harbour, Wollongong Breakwater Lighthouse, the building of two bridges for the Penrith Nepean Bridge Co. and Pyrmont Bridge.

The gaol is also significant for its association with a number of prominent German businessmen and professionals, including the engineers from the SS Emden who were interned at the gaol during WWI. There are a number of features including the hand painted friezes and other wall art works which decorate the internal walls of a number of the cells, which date from the WWI German Internment period.

The place is important in demonstrating aesthetic characteristics and/or a high degree of creative or technical achievement in New South Wales.

The Gaol is of State heritage significance as the layout design and construction of the gaol including the high perimeter walls, entry gates, pair of cell blocks demonstrate the principle tenets of "enlightened" nineteenth century prison design in NSW. The design of the prison provided: substantial masonry accommodation rather than cheaply constructed barracks, for the isolation of prisoners from each other (and hence bad influence and ideas) by the provision of a cell per prisoner, and a prison environment that allowed the rehabilitation of late term prisoners.

In addition the gaol, sited as it is, high on the peninsular above Trial Bay is aesthetically distinctive and has significant landmark qualities as a ruin which are unique throughout the State. These qualities are enhanced by the isolated setting and dramatic scale of the remnant stone structures which heighten the sense of theatre and romance associated with the place and its use as a prison, an internment camp for Germans during World War II and also the earlier wreck of the convict escape ship, the Trial.

The place has strong or special association with a particular community or cultural group in New South Wales for social, cultural or spiritual reasons.

The gaol and the surrounding area has significant associations for Thangutti Aboriginal people living throughout the State. The Aboriginal community still maintain the continuity of ceremonial practices on the site.

Trial Bay Gaol has significant associations to a number of groups of people throughout the State. It has special significance for the former German internees interned at the gaol during WWI and their families.

In addition, the site has been the centre for recreational activity for locals and others from all over the State, many of whom have returned to camp at Trial Bay gaol for up to 30 years.

The place has potential to yield information that will contribute to an understanding of the cultural or natural history of New South Wales.

The gaol site and breakwater construction is of State heritage significance as a unique opportunity to study and research into Victorian engineering works and construction. The impact the breakwater has had on the bay similarly provides a rare insight into the effects of human intervention on the landscape.

The gaol's extensive archival collection of photographs and artefacts offers a substantial resource to research the social history, uses and operation of the site over all phases of its history.

The diverse flora in the area provides an example of a range of "bush tucker" foods that were used by the local Aboriginal community that today can still be researched in conjunction with input from the local Aboriginal Community.

The significant potential archaeological resource at Trial Bay Gaol could provide a valuable insight into the construction, use and evolution of the goal and breakwater and later internment camp, the life of former inmates, internees and visitors,. The archaeology on site has the potential to contribute to knowledge of a wider complex of penal and correctional institutions in NSW.

The archaeological sites are significant for their potential to be interpreted in a setting which retains a high degree of integrity.

The place possesses uncommon, rare or endangered aspects of the cultural or natural history of New South Wales.

The Trial Bay Gaol is of State significance as the only example of a large scale gaol constructed in NSW in a remote location for the purpose of carrying out a public work, the Trial Bay Breakwater, a rare and ambitious project in itself. It is also the only nineteenth century prison constructed by the Harbours and Rivers Navigation Branch of the Department of Public Works. It contains the only example of a double storey cell block constructed of precast mass concrete block in NSW.

The gaol complex is unusual in that its isolation allowed it and its outlying places of residence and storage to be relatively open, an uncommon feature in nineteenth century prisons in NSW.

The gaol was one of five internment camps for Germans during WWI. It was the only one of these to house Germans of high social standing in the business and professional and political arenas. It was also the only internment camp to house internees from other colonial outposts.

The rarity values of the gaol are enhanced by the fact that an extensive archival collection is associated with the site, providing unusually detailed information about the sit's history and operations.

The vegetation communities found within the Trial Bay Gaol site offer habitat for at least 29 threatened species of fauna and a number of threatened plant species.

The place is important in demonstrating the principal characteristics of a class of cultural or natural places/environments in New South Wales.

Trial Bay Gaol is of State heritage significance as a fine representative example of a Maclean-era gaol which were designed to implement reform in prisoner incarceration and rehabilitation in NSW.

The Trial Bay Breakwater is similarly a good representative example of a late 19th century breakwater in NSW designed by the Harbours and Rivers Navigation Branch of the Department of Public Works.
