= Arakoon National Park =

Park in New South Wales, Australia

- IUCN category II (national park)
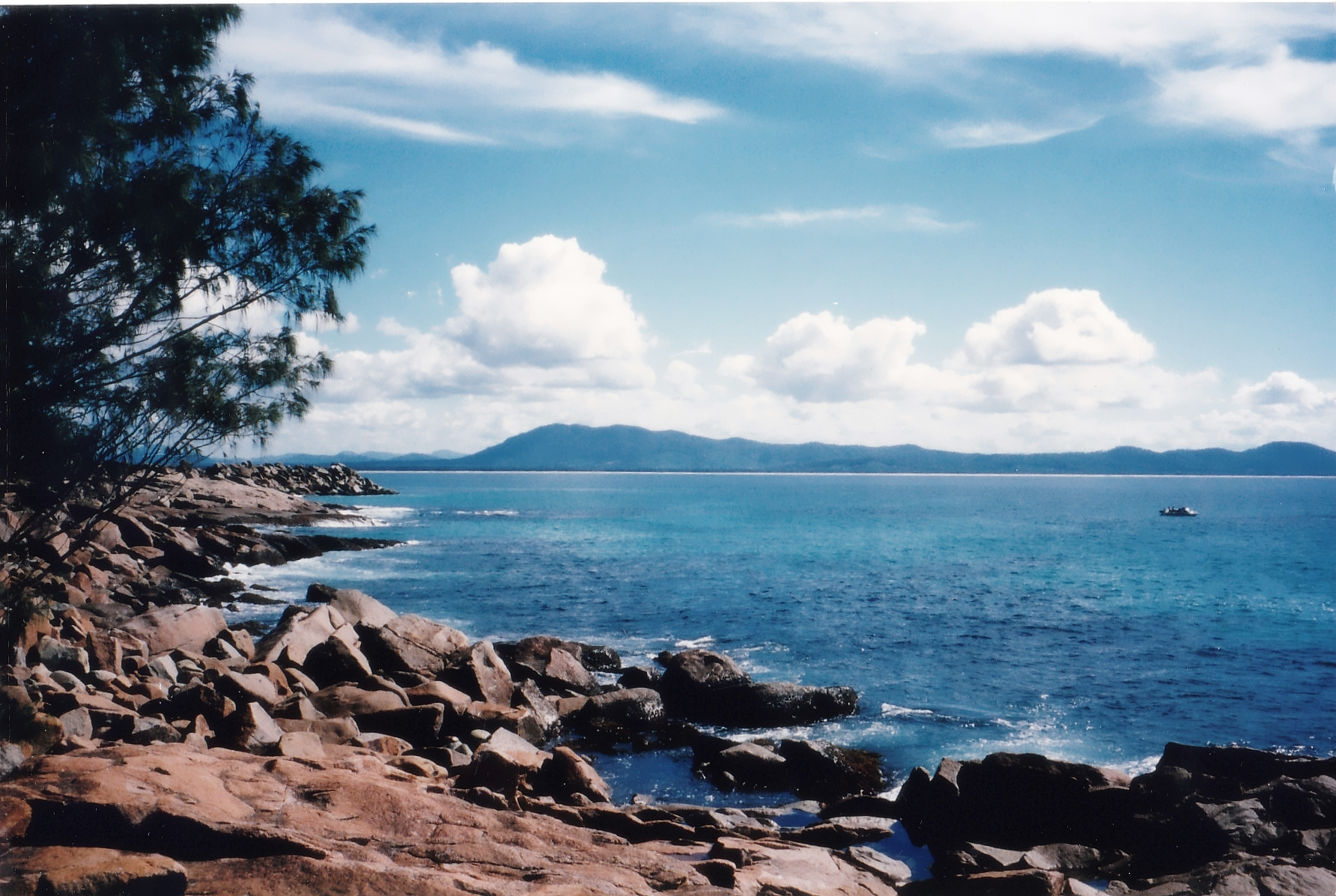
- The lookout from Trial Bay

- Location within New South Wales
- Location: New South Wales
- Nearest city: South West Rocks
- Coordinates: 30°52′38″S 153°4′4″E
- Area: 115 km^{2} (44 sq mi)
- Established: 2013
- Governing body: NSW National Parks and Wildlife Service
- Website: https://www.nationalparks.nsw.gov.au/visit-a-park/parks/arakoon-national-park

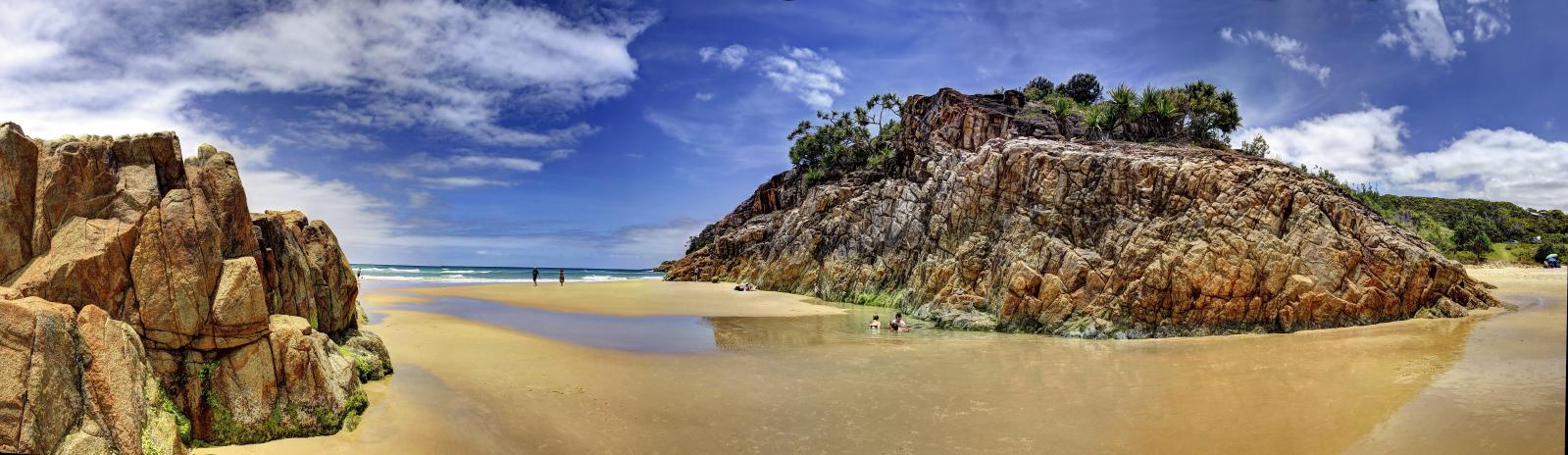
Little Bay Beach in Arakoon National Park

The Arakoon National Park is a 115-square-kilometre (44 sq mi) national park located on the north coast of New South Wales, Australia, 464 kilometres (288 mi) north-east of Sydney and 83 kilometres (52 mi) from Port Macquarie. The closest town to the national park is South West Rocks.

It is on the traditional lands of the Dunghutti people of whom it is of high cultural and spiritual significance. Within the park there are numerous sites of great spiritual and cultural significance and these include middens, stone arrangements and other spiritual sites.

The national park also contains Trial Bay Gaol, a heritage-listed former public works prison and internment camp, built in 1886.

It is located 25 kilometres (16 mi) from Hat Head National Park.

== Establishment ==
The beginnings of Arakoon National Park where when it was declared a reserve for public recreation in 1946, and then, in 1974, it became a state recreation area. It was then designated as a national park in 2013.

== Origin of place name ==
It is believed that the name Arakoon comes from the Dhanggati language word for 'hardwood parrying spear' although, it is alternately suggested, that it means 'echo' in the same language.

== See also ==
- Protected areas of New South Wales
