= Smoky Cape =

- Suburb
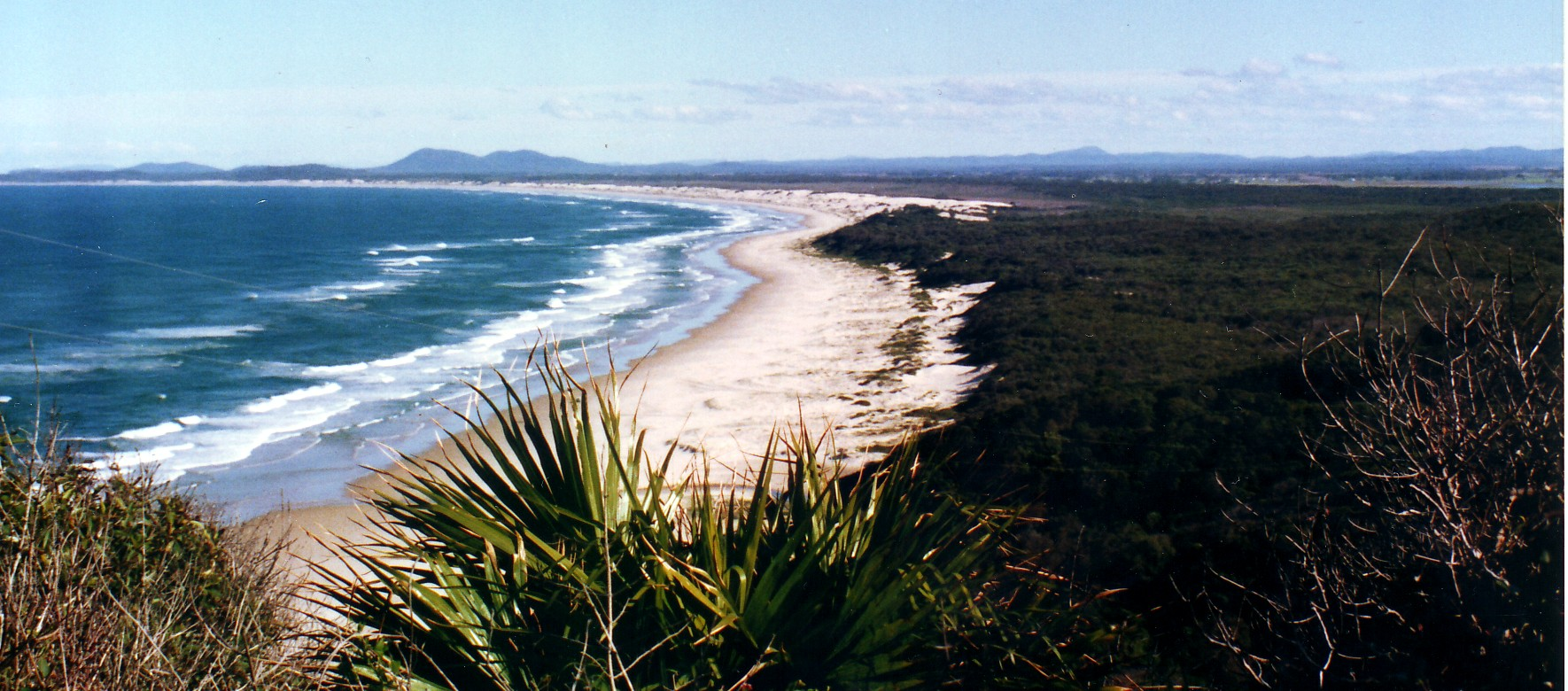

- Coordinates: 30.9237°S 153.0888°E
- Country: Australia
- State: New South Wales

Smoky Cape is a headland in Australia on the New South Wales Mid-North Coast. It lies just east of the town of South West Rocks, and within the Hat Head National Park.

== Cape ==
The cape was named Smoky Cape by Captain Cook when he passed it on 13 May 1770, writing of "a point or headland, on which were fires that caused a great quantity of smook, which occasioned my giving it the name of Smooky Cape". Smook was his usual spelling of smoke; the spelling for the cape now follows the modern spelling. The hills there were an important meeting place for aboriginal people from various surrounding areas; it's possible Cook saw fires from such a gathering.

A lighthouse was proposed for the cape in 1886 and completed in 1891. Known as the Smoky Cape Lighthouse, it was built from concrete and local granite aggregate in an octagonal shape at the highest point on the cape.

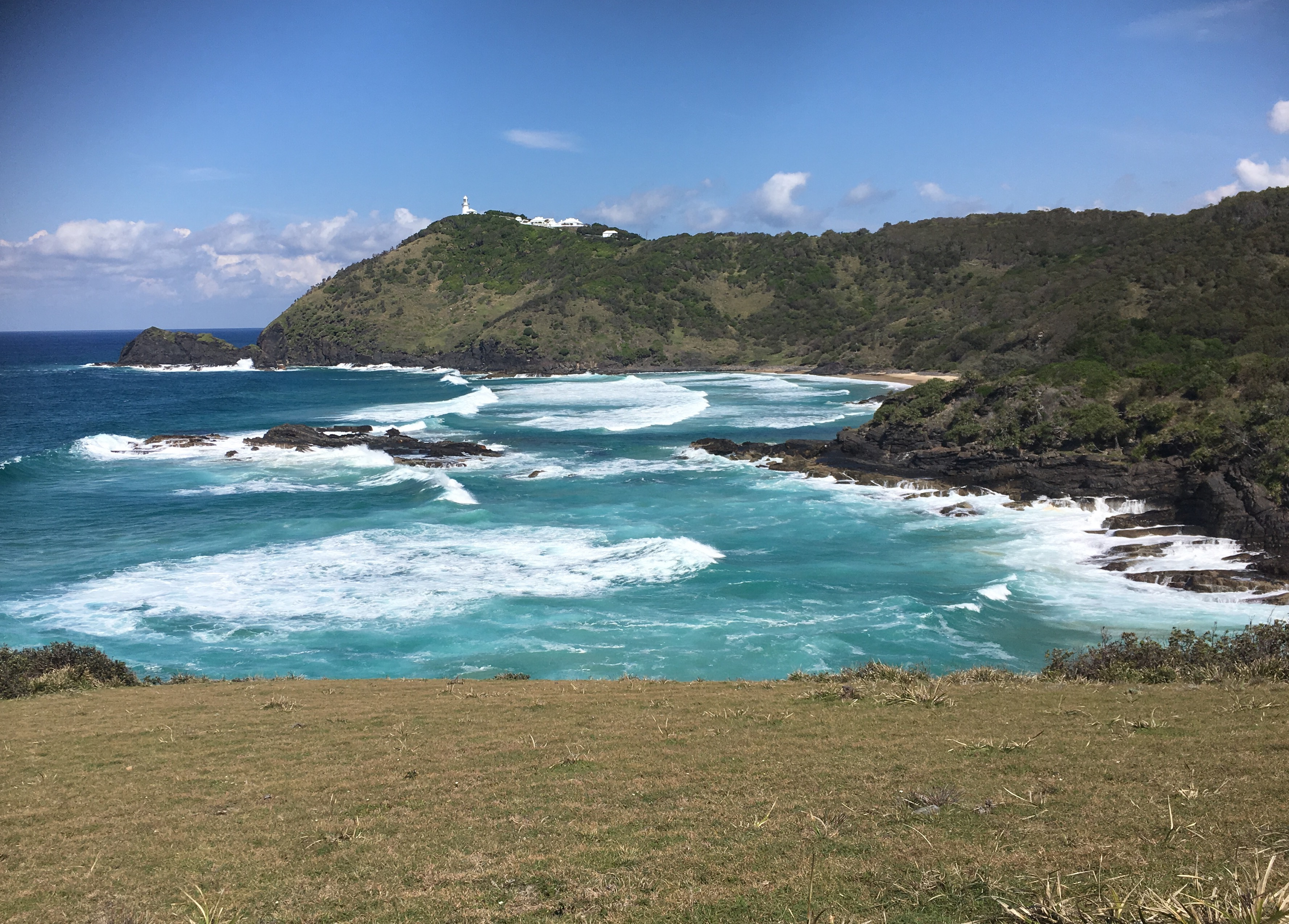
Smoky Cape

== Fish Rock ==
Fish Rock is a small, bare rock that juts out of the sea just south-east of the cape. It's a noted scuba diving location and home to various fish species. A 120-metre cave runs right under the rock, and there are various gutters nearby where grey nurse sharks live. The area is one of about a dozen in New South Wales recognised as critical for the shark, so fishing in the vicinity is restricted.

== Green Island ==
Green Island is a small island close to the coast just north of the cape. It has also been categorised as a critical habitat area for the grey nurse shark.
