= Arakoon, New South Wales =

Suburb in New South Wales, Australia

Arakoon
- Town
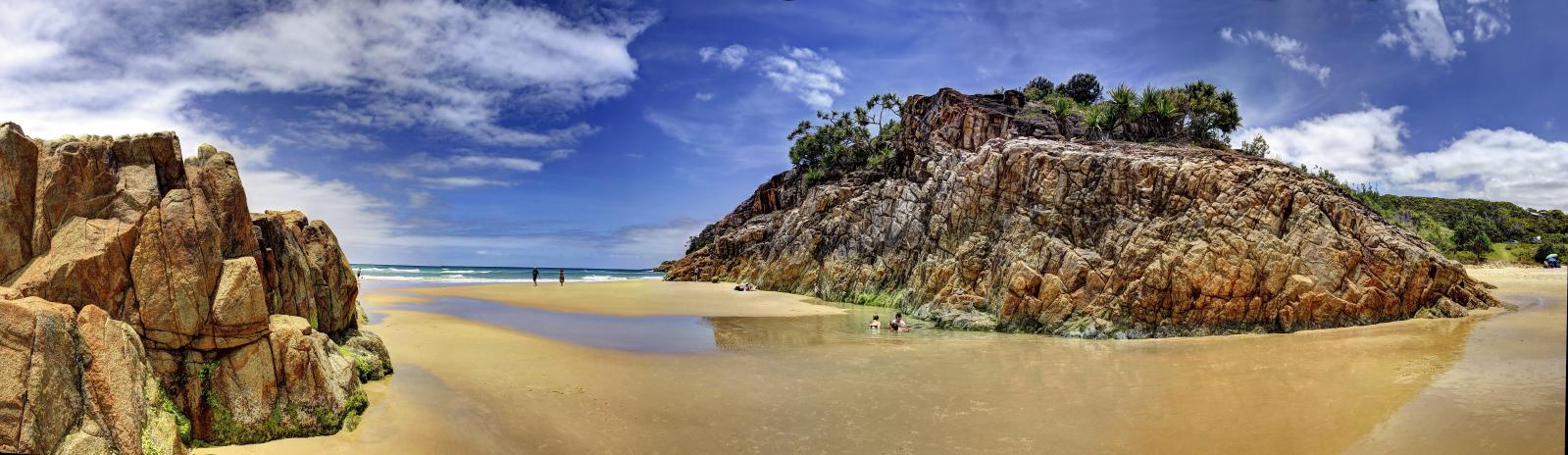
- Little Bay Beach

- Coordinates: 30°52′59.35″S 153°04′17.56″E
- Country: Australia
- State: New South Wales
- LGA: Kempsey Shire

Government
  - State electorate: Oxley
  - Federal division: Cowper

Population
  - Total: 445 (SAL 2021)
- Postcode: 2431

Arakoon is an eastern suburb of the town of South West Rocks in Kempsey Shire, New South Wales, Australia. At the 2021 census, Arakoon had a population of 445 people.

Arakoon was the original settlement of the town of South West Rocks. The settlement was later moved to the present location, where better land conditions for building were available.

The area today is home to a small number of houses, a café, a caravan park and the Trial Bay Gaol.

== Heritage listings ==
Arakoon has a number of heritage-listed sites, including:

- Cardwell Street: Trial Bay Gaol
- Lighthouse Road: Smoky Cape Lighthouse
