= Hat Head National Park =

Australian national park

- IUCN category Ib (wilderness area)
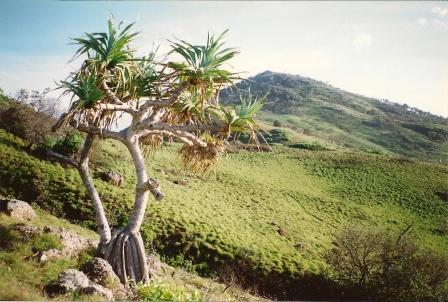
- Pandanus tectorius

- Location within New South Wales
- Location: New South Wales
- Nearest city: South West Rocks
- Coordinates: 31°04′49″S 153°01′49″E
- Area: 74 km^{2} (29 sq mi)
- Established: 28 July 1972
- Governing body: NSW National Parks & Wildlife Service

Hat Head is a national park on the Mid North Coast of New South Wales, Australia, 461.7 kilometres (286.9 mi) north-east of Sydney. It lies within the Hastings-Macleay Important Bird Area. Within the park is the eponymous village of Hat Head, with about 320 inhabitants.

It is located 25 kilometres (16 mi) from Arakoon National Park.

== Geography ==
=== Location ===
Hat Head National Park is located on the Mid North Coast of New South Wales near South West Rocks and Kempsey. The park consists of beaches, sand dunes, rocky headlands, rainforest and wetlands. The average altitude is eight metres.

== History ==
For the Dunghutti people some parts of the park remain a significant place as of their traditional land. The different areas of the park and the sea provided a rich source of food like fish and shellfish. The park is culturally important to Aboriginal people as it contains ceremonial grounds, burial sites, shell middens and campsites.

== Biodiversity ==
Hat Head National Park is rich with birdlife such as kookaburra, black swans, egrets, herons, fantails, and honeyeaters. Also hawks, falcons or eagles like white-bellied sea eagle soaring above the cliffs. Wildlife at Hat Head includes black sheoak, grass trees, glossy black cockatoo, red-necked and swamp wallabies as well as eastern grey kangaroos, sugar gliders, grey-headed flying fox and short-beaked echidna. The regent skipper (butterfly) is only found in Hat Head National Park and Limeburners Creek National Park.

== Leisure ==
Several walking tracks, fishing and whale watching can be done or just relax at the rocky headlands. Birdwatchers can look for black swans and spoonbills in the park's wetlands, hawks and eagles soaring above beach cliffs and shorebirds like curlews and plovers around the beach.

== See also ==
- Protected areas of New South Wales
- Arakoon National Park
- Smoky Cape, within the park
