= South West Rocks, New South Wales =

South West Rocks
- Town
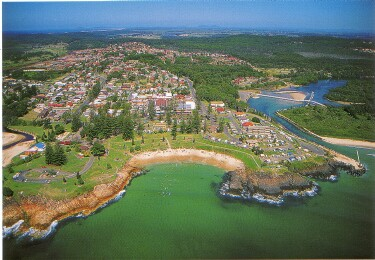
- South West Rocks

- Coordinates: 30°53′03″S 153°02′25″E
- Country: Australia
- State: New South Wales
- LGA: Kempsey Shire
- Location: 40 km (25 mi) from Kempsey

Government
  - State electorate: Oxley
  - Federal division: Cowper

Population
  - Total: 5,443 (2021 census)
- Postcode: 2431
- Mean max temp: 23.2 °C (73.8 °F)
- Mean min temp: 15.6 °C (60.1 °F)
- Annual rainfall: 1,489.7 mm (58.65 in)

South West Rocks is a town located on the Mid North Coast of New South Wales, Australia, near the mouth of the Macleay River. It is approximately 40 km (25 mi) from Kempsey. Jerseyville is located nearby.

The population of South West Rocks is 5,443 people, and maintains a steady growth rate. The tourist population of South West Rocks increases markedly during the holiday season. The area's beaches as well as man-made attractions such as Trial Bay Gaol and Smoky Cape Lighthouse are local tourist attractions. Because of the warm ocean in the area fed by the East Coast current which flows down from the tropical regions it is possible to swim all year round.

36% of the population of South West Rocks are over 65 and the town has an average age of 56 as of the 2016 Australian census.

Trial Bay is one of the few north facing bays on the Australian east coast.

== History ==
Arakoon was originally established as the township on Trial Bay in 1866. However, by 1889, South West Rocks had established itself as a popular bathing resort with people of the Macleay Valley. South West Rocks got its name most likely from the captains of passing ships, who claimed it was safest to moor vessels near the rocks, south west of Laggers Point (the point on which Trial Bay Gaol is built). Another theory is that their moorings would be safe if they kept the rocks to their south west. Trial Bay was named after a brig, The Trial, which was stolen and wrecked by convicts in 1816 in the bay that now bears its name.

On 13 May 1770, Captain James Cook observed smoke from a fire on a mountain which he named Smoky Cape. The headland in front of the mountain is now the location of Smoky Cape Lighthouse.

In 1972, a Sydney Harbour showboat, Sydney Queen, and the former Newcastle car carriers Lurgurena and Koondooloo, were wrecked on the Main Beach after breaking free from their moorings in heavy storms. Elements of all three vessels were salvaged, but the hull of Sydney Queen filled with sand and could not be removed. It was eventually burned to the waterline to remove the obstruction from the beach.

Historical population
Year	Pop.	±%
1966	636	—
1971	845	+32.9%
1976	1,176	+39.2%
1981	1,314	+11.7%
1986	1,947	+48.2%
1991	2,886	+48.2%
1996	3,514	+21.8%
2001	4,110	+17.0%
2006	4,069	−1.0%
2011	4,816	+18.4%
2016	5,009	+4.0%
2021	5,443	+8.7%
Source: Australian Bureau of Statistics data.

== Heritage listings ==
South West Rocks has a number of heritage-listed sites, including:

- 5 Ocean Drive: South West Rocks Pilot Station Complex

(in Arakoon);

- Cardwell Street: Trial Bay Gaol
- Lighthouse Road: Smoky Cape Lighthouse

== Climate ==
South West Rocks

Climate chart (precipitation, max. and min. temperature)
J	F	M	A	M	J	J	A	S	O	N	D
141 27 20	179 27 20	166 26 19	189 24 17	153 22 15	128 20 12	85 19 12	56 20 12	58 23 14	87 24 15	137 25 17	115 26 19
- █ Average max. and min. temperatures in °C
- █ Precipitation totals in mm
Imperial conversion
J	F	M	A	M	J	J	A	S	O	N	D
5.6 81 68	7 81 68	6.5 80 66	7.4 76 62	6 71 58	5 67 54	3.3 66 53	2.2 69 54	2.3 73 57	3.4 75 60	5.4 76 62	4.5 79 65
- █ Average max. and min. temperatures in °F
- █ Precipitation totals in inches

South West Rocks has a warm and wet humid subtropical climate. The warmest month on average is February with a mean maximum temperature of 27.0 °C (80.6 °F) and the coldest month on average is July with a mean maximum temperature of 18.7 °C (65.7 °F). On an annual basis, South West Rocks averages 121.2 clear days, the most in August with 14.7 and the least in January with 8.1. Dew-points in the summer average at around 20–21 °C (68–70 °F). The wettest month is March and the driest month is September. South West Rocks experiences a mean of 137.5 raindays annually, with the most occurring in March and the least occurring in July. South West Rocks gets the highest mean amount of rain during the Autumn and the lowest mean amount of rain during the Spring.

Some of the heaviest rainfall received at South West Rocks is quite often received from weather systems known as "East Coast Low Pressure systems" also known as "Mid Latitude Cyclones" not to be confused with Tropical Cyclones which are formed by different type of convection currents. These weather Systems often cause major flooding in the valley and also cause beach erosion and wind damage. Approximately an average of four of these systems impact on the area each year to varying degrees depending on their location and mostly occur from January to June although have been known to occur at other times of the year. Tropical cyclones which form further to the north have been known to impact on the area occasionally but this has only happened on an about half a dozen occasions over the last 100 years.

South West Rocks' thunderstorm activity is mainly during the period from September to March (inclusive), with October and November being the months where the risk of a severe thunderstorm is increased due to a relatively high frequency of unstable atmospheric conditions which favour frequent and strong thunderstorm development. Hail is relatively rare at South West Rocks, only occurring once every year or two, and it is usually less than 2 centimetres (0.8 in) in diameter.

=== Climatic Averages for South West Rocks (Smoky Cape Lighthouse) ===
Climate data for South West Rocks (Smoky Cape Lighthouse, averages 1991–2020, records 1939-2023)
Month	Jan	Feb	Mar	Apr	May	Jun	Jul	Aug	Sep	Oct	Nov	Dec	Year
Record high °C (°F)	39.5 (103.1)	39.2 (102.6)	34.3 (93.7)	32.8 (91.0)	29.5 (85.1)	26.3 (79.3)	28.3 (82.9)	31.5 (88.7)	35.6 (96.1)	39.2 (102.6)	41.7 (107.1)	39.5 (103.1)	41.7 (107.1)
Mean daily maximum °C (°F)	28.0 (82.4)	27.9 (82.2)	26.9 (80.4)	24.8 (76.6)	22.2 (72.0)	19.9 (67.8)	19.5 (67.1)	20.9 (69.6)	23.0 (73.4)	24.2 (75.6)	25.3 (77.5)	26.7 (80.1)	24.1 (75.4)
Mean daily minimum °C (°F)	20.2 (68.4)	20.0 (68.0)	19.0 (66.2)	16.8 (62.2)	14.6 (58.3)	12.5 (54.5)	11.8 (53.2)	12.2 (54.0)	14.0 (57.2)	15.5 (59.9)	16.8 (62.2)	18.8 (65.8)	16.0 (60.8)
Record low °C (°F)	13.3 (55.9)	12.0 (53.6)	11.0 (51.8)	9.1 (48.4)	5.9 (42.6)	4.2 (39.6)	4.4 (39.9)	4.0 (39.2)	4.4 (39.9)	7.8 (46.0)	9.0 (48.2)	8.0 (46.4)	4.0 (39.2)
Average rainfall mm (inches)	123.5 (4.86)	175.5 (6.91)	174.4 (6.87)	155.0 (6.10)	113.9 (4.48)	147.2 (5.80)	70.1 (2.76)	55.9 (2.20)	51.9 (2.04)	68.7 (2.70)	131.4 (5.17)	119.6 (4.71)	1,388.5 (54.67)
Average precipitation days	12.7	13.1	15.6	12.7	11.1	10.4	8.4	7.2	7.6	9.9	12.5	13.3	134.5
Average afternoon relative humidity (%)	73	74	74	72	72	68	63	60	66	70	72	74	70
Source: Bureau of Meteorology

South West Rocks (Smoky Cape Lighthouse) Rainfall Data 1939-2023
Month	Jan	Feb	Mar	Apr	May	Jun	Jul	Aug	Sep	Oct	Nov	Dec	Year
Average rainfall mm (inches)	140.6 (5.5)	171.5 (6.8)	192.1 (7.6)	166.1 (6.5)	126.8 (5.0)	135.2 (5.3)	74.9 (2.9)	77.3 (3.0)	56.6 (2.2)	91.8 (3.6)	111.4 (4.4)	121.7 (4.8)	1,466.7 (57.7)
Highest Daily rainfall mm (inches)	178.6 (7.0)	158.6 (6.2)	217.7 (8.6)	343.7 (13.5)	227.6 (9.0)	209.3 (8.2)	163.6 (6.4)	215.9 (8.5)	89.0 (3.5)	142.6 (5.6)	147.1 (5.8)	193.8 (7.6)	343.7 (13.5)
Highest Monthly rainfall mm (inches)	527.0 (20.7)	509.2 (20.0)	649.3 (25.6)	702.6 (27.7)	466.5 (18.4)	573.2 (22.6)	597.5 (23.5)	380.6 (15.0)	254.4 (10.0)	536.4 (21.1)	434.8 (17.1)	513.4 (20.2)	3,011.2 (118.6)
Lowest rainfall mm (inches)	0.0 (0.0)	3.8 (0.1)	24.2 (1.0)	7.2 (0.3)	1.4 (0.1)	5.6 (0.2)	0.0 (0.0)	0.0 (0.0)	0.0 (0.0)	2.4 (0.1)	6.9 (0.3)	15.5 (0.6)	772.2 (30.4)
Source: Bureau of Meteorology

== Industry ==
South West Rocks has a long history of commercial fishing. Local fishermen, OceanWatch Australia and the local surf life saving club hold an annual Loaves and Fishes Barbeque on Good Friday.

== Media ==
The South West Rocks News was once printed as a cover page to the Tuesday edition of The Macleay Valley Argus. This is no longer the case. A weekly free paper The Mid Coast Observer and magazine the Macleay Valley Happynings are home delivered every Wednesday to households within South West Rocks. TV broadcasts are usually received from Mt Moombil, west of Coffs Harbour, though in some locations it is possible to receive signals from Middlebrother Mtn, Northeast of Taree. Radio signals are able to be received from multiple locations, including; Port Macquarie, Kempsey, and Coffs Harbour.

== Development ==
Development in the town has increased from the turn of the 21st century, with The Rocks Central Shopping Centre opening in 2002, and an adjacent housing subdivision known as Oceanside.

South West Rocks may be divided into five main areas: South West Rocks, Arakoon, Oceanside, New Entrance and Spencerville. Arakoon is located to the east of South West Rocks and is home to Trial Bay Gaol. New Entrance is the river mouth located to the west of South West Rocks and locals also refer to the residential area on a ridge just to the east of the Macleay River at the river mouth as Sandfly Hill.

Oceanside is located adjacent to The Rocks Shopping Fair; it is a relatively new subdivision in South West Rocks and consists of recently built houses. Spencerville is the most southern area of South West Rocks. It runs from The Rocks Shopping Fair south to Spencers Creek Bridge and was its own village prior to recent development in Oceanside that joined South West Rocks and Spencerville.

In 2023, the Land and Environment Court of New South Wales ruled in favour of a residential project proceeding on the basis of a development application originally applied for in 1993.

== Suburbs ==
- South West Rocks
- Arakoon
- Sandfly Hill
- Jerseyville
- Oceanside
- Spencerville

== Schools ==
South West Rocks has two pre-schools and a Government primary school, South West Rocks Public School. There is no high school despite the efforts of the Lower Macleay Valley High School Association. High school students travel to Kempsey to one of the three high schools, Melville High School, Kempsey High School or St Paul's Catholic College. Some primary school students also travel to St Josephs Primary School, Kempsey East Public School, Kinchela Primary School or Kempsey Adventist School (which is both a pre-kindigarten, primary and secondary school).

== Sport ==
The South West Rocks Marlins play in the Hastings District Rugby League competition.
