= Jerseyville, New South Wales =

Coordinates: 30°56′S 153°02′E

Jerseyville is a small village on the Mid North Coast of New South Wales, Australia in Kempsey Shire. It is on South West Rocks Road, near South West Rocks. It is situated between Spencers Creek and the Macleay River. The village consists of only a handful of streets. It is a satellite suburb of South West Rocks and is a well-known fishing village. The town was originally called "Robinson's Wharf" and was founded in the 19th century after George Robinson subdivided his property. It was also known as ' Pelican's Island'. Its importance during the next generation or so was based upon the fact that coastal shipping was the main method of transport between the major Australian cities and the Macleay River Valley.
