= Trial Bay =

Bay in New South Wales, Australia

Coordinates: 30°52′S 153°03′E

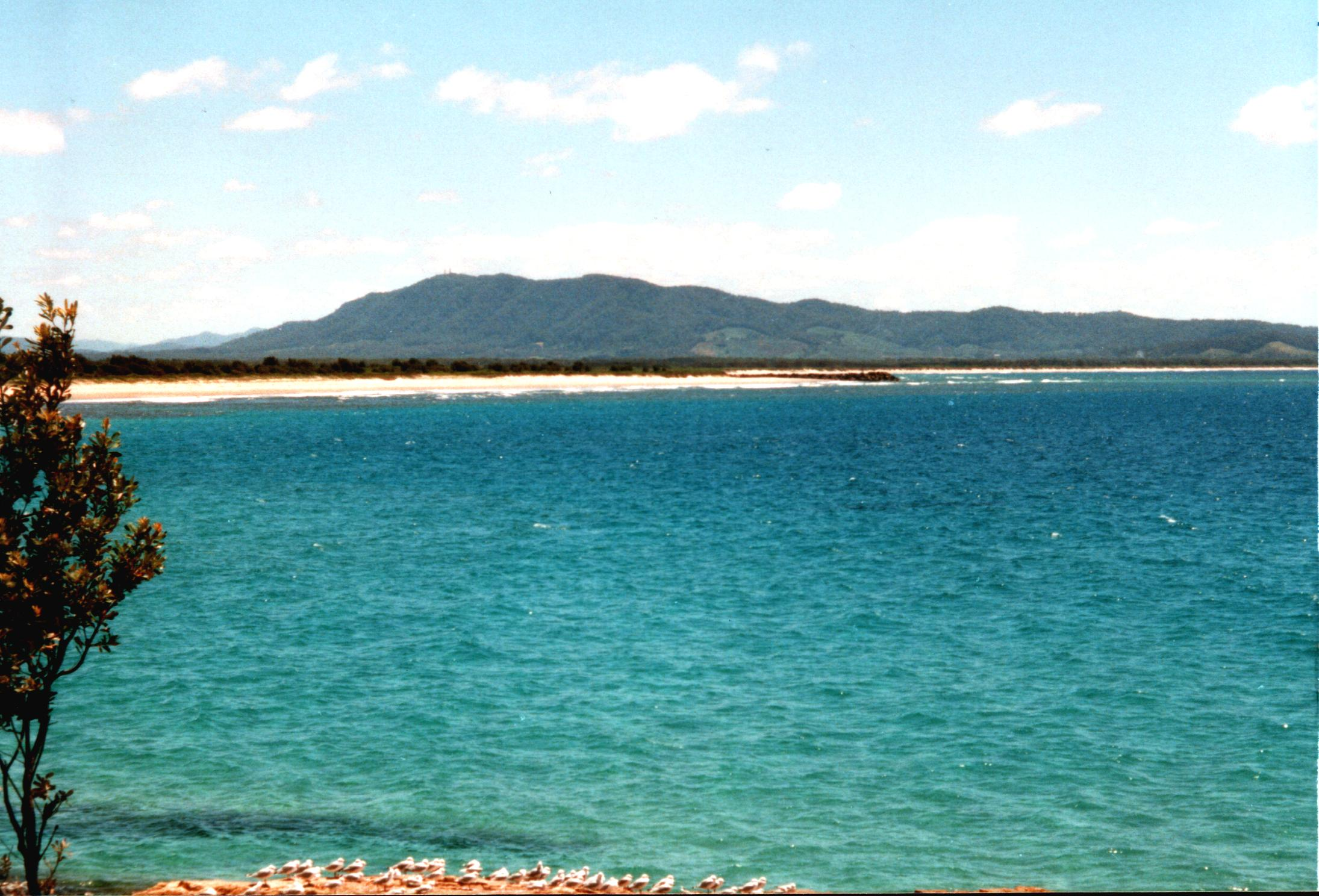
Trial Bay

Trial Bay is a broad bay on the Mid North Coast of New South Wales, Australia. The bay faces northwards and extends from Laggers Point in the east around to Grassy Head to the west, past the town of South West Rocks and the Macleay River mouth.

The bay is named after the Trial, a brig which was shipwrecked there in 1816 after being seized by a group of convicts.

In 1820 John Oxley explored the area. He reported Port Macquarie as more favourable for settlement than Trial Bay, though Trial Bay might offer an anchorage while waiting for favourable winds to cross the bar at Port Macquarie.

Trial Bay has a northerly facing opening and is sheltered from the predominant southerly swells. There have been various plans over the years to make it a full harbour, protected in all conditions. Its location in between other sheltered waters of Moreton Bay and Port Stephens recommended such a project. Trial Bay Gaol was established with the intention of using prison labour to build a breakwater extending from Laggers Point. The attempt was abandoned in 1903 (progress kept being washed away by storms) and the prison closed soon after. It was also the site of an internment camp during WW1.

In the 1960s an oil terminal established near South West Rocks reignited interest in a harbour, but the Department of Public Works concluded the cost would not be warranted. Ships moored in the bay and delivered oil via a pipeline extending approximately 2 km to the terminal operated by Caltex. The terminal is noted as decommissioned in 2003.
