= Kempsey Shire =

- Local government area
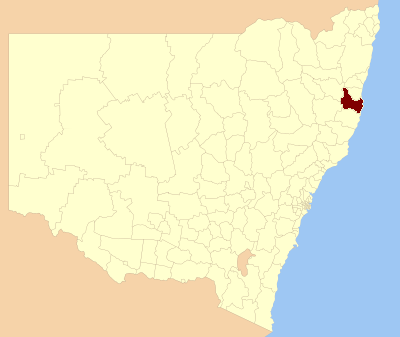
- Location in New South Wales

- Interactive map of Kempsey Shire
- Coordinates: 31°05′S 152°50′E
- Country: Australia
- State: New South Wales
- Region: Mid North Coast
- Established: 1 October 1975
- Council seat: Kempsey

Government
  - Mayor: Kinne Ring (Independent)
  - State electorate: Oxley
  - Federal division: Cowper

Area
  - Total: 3,380 km^{2} (1,310 sq mi)

Population
  - Totals: 28,885 (2016 census); 29,665 (2018 est.)
  - Density: 8.546/km^{2} (22.13/sq mi)
- Website: Kempsey Shire
LGAs around Kempsey Shire
| Armidale | Bellingen & Nambucca | Tasman Sea |
| Walcha | Kempsey Shire | Tasman Sea |
| Walcha | Port Macquarie-Hastings | Tasman Sea |

Kempsey Shire is a local government area in the Mid North Coast region of New South Wales, Australia.

The shire services an area of 3,380 square kilometres (1,310 sq mi) and is located on the Pacific Highway and the North Coast railway line. Kempsey Shire was formed on 1 October 1975 by the amalgamation of the former Kempsey Municipality and the former Macleay Shire.

At the 2011 census, Kempsey Shire had a high proportion of Aboriginal and Torres Strait Islander people residing within its boundaries; being 11.1 per cent of the resident population, more than four times the national and state averages of 2.5 per cent. The shire also contains a coastal strip that was identified in 2007, and confirmed in 2015, as one of the most socially disadvantaged areas in Australia.

The mayor of the Kempsey Shire is Kinne Ring, an independent politician.

== Suburbs ==
- Aldavilla
- Burnt Bridge
- Dondingalong
- East Kempsey
- Euroka
- Greenhill
- Kempsey
- Sherwood
- South Kempsey
- West Kempsey
- Yarravel

== Towns and localities ==
Towns and localities in the Kempsey Shire are:

=== Kempsey suburbs ===
- Kempsey
- East Kempsey
- South Kempsey
- West Kempsey

=== Other localities ===
- Aldavilla
- Arakoon
- Bellbrook
- Bellimbopinni
- Belmore River
- Burnt Bridge
- Carcolla
- Clybucca
- Collombatti
- Comara
- Crescent Head
- Dondingalong
- Euroka
- Frederickton
- Gladstone
- Greenhill
- Hat Head
- Jerseyville
- Kinchela
- Kundabung
- Millbank
- Mungay Creek
- New Entrance
- Nulla Nulla
- Oceanside
- Rainbow Beach
- Sherwood
- Smithtown
- South West Rocks
- Stuarts Point
- Turners Flat
- Warbro
- Willawarrin
- Yarrahapinni
- Yarravel

== Demographics ==
At the 2016 census, there were 28,885 people in the Kempsey Shire local government area, of these 50 per cent were male and 50 per cent were female. The median age of people in the Kempsey Shire was 47 years; some nine years older than the national median. Children aged 0 – 14 years made up 17.2 per cent of the population and people aged 65 years and over made up 23.9 per cent of the population. Of people in the area aged 15 years and over, 43.9 per cent were married and 15.7 per cent were either divorced or separated. At the 2011 Census Aboriginal and Torres Strait Islander people made up 11.1 per cent of the population, more than four times the national average.

Population growth in the Kempsey Shire between the 2001 census and 2006 census was 1.86 per cent; and in the subsequent five years to the 2011 census was 2.73 per cent. Following this, the growth between the 2011 Census and the 2016 Census was 2.67 per cent. When compared with total population growth of Australia for the same periods, being 5.78 per cent, 8.32 per cent and 8.81 per cent respectively, population growth in the Kempsey Shire local government area was significantly lower than the national average. The median weekly income for residents within the Kempsey Shire was significantly below the national average, being one of the factors that place parts of the Kempsey Shire in an area of social disadvantage.

At the 2011 Census, the proportion of residents in the Kempsey Shire local government area who stated their ancestry as Australian or Anglo-Celtic exceeded 81 per cent of all residents (national average was 65.2 per cent) and in the 2016 Census, this value was 79.4 per cent compared to the national average of 62.3 per cent. In excess of 62 per cent of all residents in the Kempsey Shire nominated a religious affiliation with Christianity at the 2011 census (62.9 per cent in 2016), which was higher than the national average of 50.2 per cent (49.2 per cent in 2016).

Meanwhile, as at the 2011 Census date, compared to the national average, households in the Kempsey Shire local government area had a significantly lower than average proportion (3.3 per cent) where two or more languages are spoken (national average was 20.4 per cent); and a significantly higher proportion (91.9 per cent) where English only was spoken at home (national average was 76.8 per cent).

Selected historical census data for Kempsey local government area
| Census year | | 2001 | 2006 | 2011 | 2016 | 2021 |
|---|---|---|---|---|---|---|
| Population | Estimated residents on census night | 26,887 | 27,387 | 28,134 | 28,885 | 30,688 |
| Population | LGA rank in terms of size within New South Wales | | | 62nd | 61st | 60th |
| Population | % of New South Wales population | | | 0.41% | | |
| Population | % of Australian population | 0.14% | 0.14% | ▼0.13% | | |
Cultural and language diversity
| Ancestry, top responses | Australian | | | 35.3% | 34.2% | ▲41.1% |
| Ancestry, top responses | English | | | 31.7% | 30.4% | ▲40.4% |
| Ancestry, top responses | Aboriginal Australian | | | | | 11.3% |
| Ancestry, top responses | Irish | | | 8.3% | 8.5% | ▲9.5% |
| Ancestry, top responses | Scottish | | | 6.0% | 6.3% | ▲8.7% |
| Ancestry, top responses | German | | | 2.6% | 2.7% | ▲3.5% |
| Language, top responses (other than English) | German | 0.2% | 0.2% | 0.2% | | |
| Language, top responses (other than English) | Tagalog | 0.1% | 0.1% | 0.1% | | |
| Language, top responses (other than English) | Cantonese | n/c | n/c | ▲0.1% | | |
| Language, top responses (other than English) | Dutch | 0.1% | 0.1% | 0.1% | | |
| Language, top responses (other than English) | French | 0.1% | 0.1% | 0.1% | | |
Religious affiliation
| Religious affiliation, top responses | Anglican | 29.9% | ▼27.7% | ▼26.6% | ▼22.1% | ▼17.2% |
| Religious affiliation, top responses | Catholic | 25.9% | ▼25.4% | ▼25.1% | ▼22.0% | ▼18.5% |
| Religious affiliation, top responses | No religion | 11.9% | ▲14.6% | ▲17.8% | ▲25.6% | ▲37.5% |
| Religious affiliation, top responses | Uniting Church | 9.8% | ▼8.7% | ▼7.6% | ▼5.9% | ▼4.5% |
| Religious affiliation, top responses | Presbyterian and Reformed | 3.9% | ▼3.5% | ▼3.2% | | |
Median weekly incomes
| Personal income | Median weekly personal income | | A$319 | A$386 | A$474 | A$550 |
| Personal income | % of Australian median income | | 68.5% | ▼66.9% | ▲71.6% | ▼68.32% |
| Family income | Median weekly family income | | A$614 | A$902 | A$1,107 | A$1,347 |
| Family income | % of Australian median income | | 59.8% | ▲60.9% | ▲63.84% | ▼63.54% |
| Household income | Median weekly household income | | A$737 | A$748 | A$894 | A$1,085 |
| Household income | % of Australian median income | | 62.9% | ▼60.6% | ▲62.17% | ▼62.14% |

== Council ==
=== Current composition and election method ===
Kempsey Shire Council is composed of nine councillors, including the mayor, for a fixed four-year term of office. The mayor is directly elected while the eight other councillors are elected proportionally as one entire ward. The most recent election was held on 30 July 2022.

== Election results ==
=== 2024 ===
2024 New South Wales local elections: Kempsey
| Party | Candidate | Votes | % | ±% |
|---|---|---|---|---|
| Independent | 1. Alexandra Wyatt (elected 1); 2. Julie Coburn (elected 6); 3. June Wilson; 4. Gail Ryan | 5,195 | 29.6 | +20.6 |
| Independent | 1. Kinne Ring; 2. Annette Lawrence (elected 2); 3. Adam Matchett (elected 8); 4. Tyrone Walker | 3,639 | 20.7 | +13.4 |
| The Selby Team | 1. Noel Selby (elected 5); 2. Charanjit Bedi; 3. Richard Pearson; 4. Lindsay Keay | 2,299 | 13.1 | +8.7 |
| Independent | 1. Dean Saul (elected 3); 2. Scott Butterfield; 3. Rebecca Clifford; 4. Grant Simpson; 5. Tina Carney | 2,253 | 12.8 | −9.8 |
| Greens | 1. Arthur Bain (elected 4); 2. Michael Jones; 3. Vicki Taylor; 4. Beris Derwent | 2,213 | 12.6 | −7.3 |
| Independent | Ben Paix (elected 7) | 1,551 | 8.8 | +8.8 |
| Independent | Troy Irwin | 252 | 1.4 | −2.6 |
| Independent | Trevor Martin | 107 | 0.6 | +0.6 |
| Independent | Stephen McNamara | 29 | 0.2 | −0.3 |
| Total formal votes | | 17,538 | 89.3 | −3.5 |
| Informal votes | | 2,108 | 10.7 | +3.5 |
| Turnout | | 19,646 | 81.8 | +3.1 |

=== 2022 ===
2022 New South Wales local elections: Kempsey (Note: Changes compared with the results at the 2021 elections.)
| Party | Candidate | Votes | % | ±% |
|---|---|---|---|---|
| Quota | | 1,890 | | |
| Independent | 1. Dean Saul (elected 3); 2. Scott Butterfield (elected 5); 3. Michael Vella; 4. George Thring | 3,843 | 22.60 | +18.40 |
| Greens | 1. Arthur Bain (elected 1); 2. Dianne Nolan; 3. Caroline George; 4. Graeme Carrad | 3,246 | 19.90 | +9.70 |
| Independent | 1. Simon Fergusson (elected 2); 2. Joshua Freeman; 3. Daniel Freeman; 4. Margaret Moir | 2,099 | 12.35 | −8.85 |
| Independent | Anthony Patterson (elected 4) | 1,909 | 11.23 | +7.83 |
| Independent | Kerri Riddington (elected 7) | 1,562 | 9.19 | +3.39 |
| Independent | Alexandra Wyatt (elected 6) | 1,537 | 9.04 | +1.04 |
| Independent | Kinne Ring (elected 8) | 1,234 | 7.26 | +2.96 |
| Independent | Noel Selby | 753 | 4.43 | +1.43 |
| Independent SFF | Troy Irwin | 507 | 2.98 | −0.32 |
| Independent | Bruce Raeburn | 119 | 0.70 | −1.80 |
| Independent | Andrew Evans | 102 | 0.60 | +1.40 |
| Independent | Stephen McNamara | 91 | 0.54 | +0.54 |
| Total formal votes | | 17,002 | 92.82 | +5.22 |
| Informal votes | | 1,315 | 7.18 | −5.22 |
| Turnout | | 18,317 | 78.50 | −2.80 |

=== 2021 ===
2021 New South Wales local elections: Kempsey
| Party | Candidate | Votes | % | ±% |
|---|---|---|---|---|
| Independent | 1. Simon Fergusson (elected); 2. Joshua Freeman (elected); 3. Amber Piercy; 4. Daniel Freeman | 3,440 | 21.2 | |
| Independent | Liz Campbell (elected) | 1,912 | 11.8 | |
| Independent | 1. Vijay Craigie (elected); 2. Kevin Thorne; 3. Mark Shanney; 4. Leslie Freeman | 1,886 | 11.6 | |
| Greens | Arthur Bain (elected) | 1,649 | 10.2 | |
| Independent | Alexandra Wyatt (elected) | 1,299 | 8.0 | |
| Independent | Kerri Riddington (elected) | 934 | 5.8 | |
| Independent | Kinne Ring | 704 | 4.3 | |
| Independent | Dean Saul | 685 | 4.2 | |
| Independent | Mark Baxter | 618 | 3.8 | |
| Independent | Anthony Patterson (elected) | 558 | 3.4 | |
| Independent SFF | Troy Irwin | 537 | 3.3 | |
| Independent | Sue McGinn | 509 | 3.1 | |
| Independent | Byron Fegan | 416 | 2.6 | |
| Independent | Bruce Raeburn | 397 | 2.5 | |
| Independent | Andrew Evans | 331 | 2.0 | |
| Independent | Noel Selby | 329 | 2.0 | |
| Total formal votes | | 16,204 | 87.6 | |
| Informal votes | | 2,289 | 12.4 | |
| Turnout | | 18,493 | 81.3 | |

- Election re-run in July 2022 after the New South Wales Electoral Commission's online voting system crashed

== See also ==
- Local government in New South Wales
