= Biriwal Bulga National Park =

National park in New South Wales, Australia

- IUCN category II (national park)
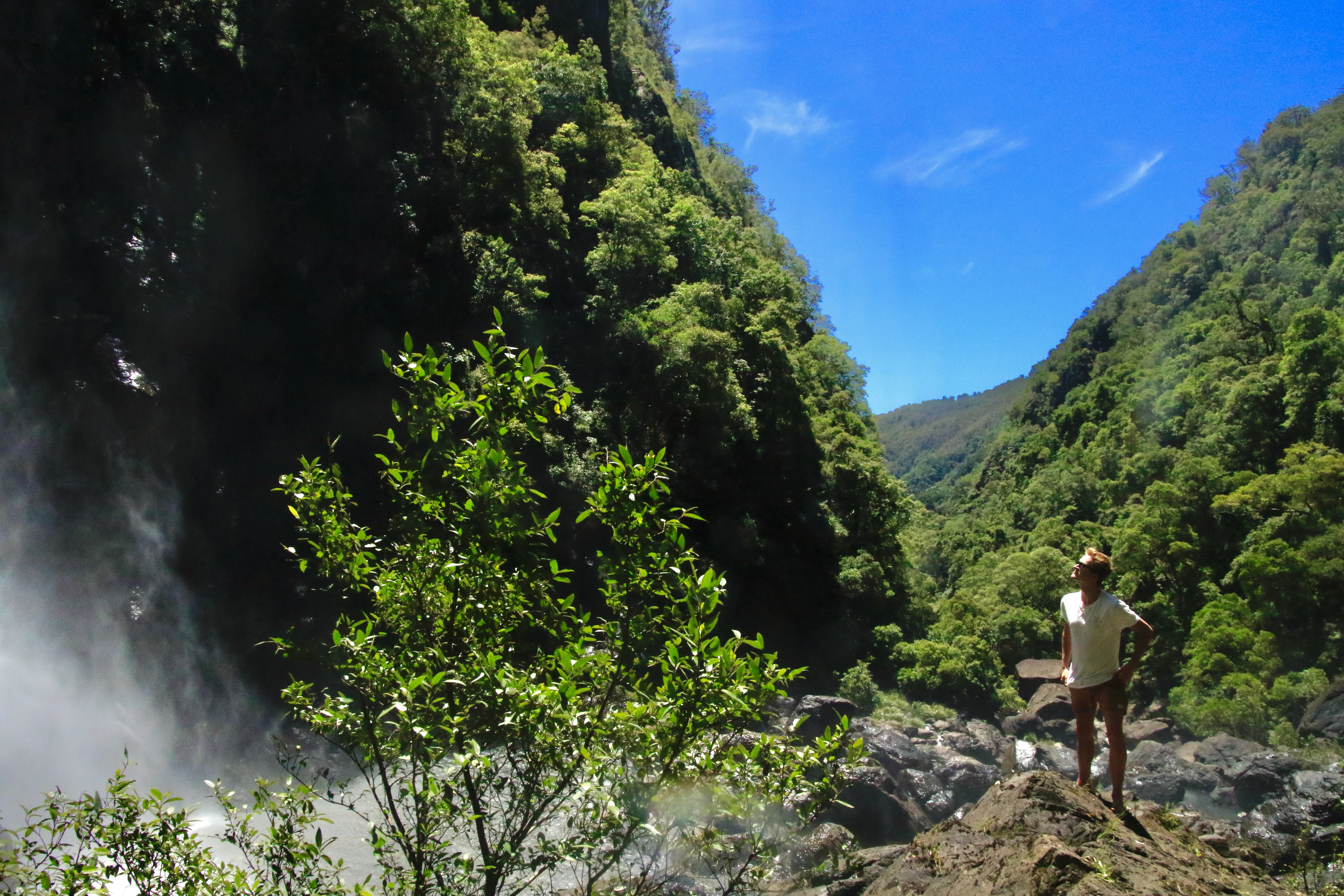
- Ellenborough Falls, Biriwal Bulga National Park

- Location within New South Wales
- Location: New South Wales
- Coordinates: 31°30′26″S 152°18′23″E
- Area: 65.28 km^{2} (25.20 sq mi)
- Established: 1999
- Governing body: NSW National Parks and Wildlife Service

Biriwal Bulga National Park is an Australian national park in New South Wales. It is approximately 45 km northwest of Taree and 60 km west of Port Macquarie on the Bulga Plateau.

The national park contains biodiverse ecosystems as well as culturally significant Indigenous Australian sites. The residents of the park range from animals to trees and bushes. The animals reside in an escarpment terrain. The park's soil varies in depth depending on the slope. Relatively high annual rainfall contributes to the types of native plants found.

There are different conservation and management plans in place to maintain the natural and cultural heritage of the park whilst also providing research opportunities for visitors. The plans are set out and authorised by NSW National Parks and Wildlife Services. Some plans include conservation regions for koalas and plants, limiting the spread and influence of pests and prevention of potential bushfires.

== Etymology and indigenous heritage ==
The name Biriwal Bulga originates from the Indigenous Birpai or Biripi people who have resided in the area for over 15,000 years. The Indigenous Australians in the local neighbourhood speak the Birpai language. The language spoken by the tribes surrounding the Birpai people is Gadjang.

Campsites and artifacts found within the park indicate long-term habitation of Indigenous Australians within the area. Truyard Pty. Ltd estimated that originally anywhere from 800 to 1000 Indigenous Australians inhabited the national park and surrounding regions. The people were dispersed throughout the land in smaller clan groups, with the most prominent being the Winmurra people.

== History ==
Exploration occurred initially in the surrounding areas of Biriwal Bulga in the 1800s after European settlement. It was not until 1982 that settlers began making discoveries within the park. The date of the first discoveries marks Biriwal Bulga National Park as one of the latest National Parks to be discovered in the Port Macquarie region.

In the early 1900s, Bulga State Forest Area was predominantly utilised for timber harvesting and logging operations. This resulted in the implementation of a pine plantation within the National Park. In 1990, the State government placed a moratorium on further harvesting to ensure survival of the ecosystem. This resulted in the area shifting from Bulga State Forest Area to a conservation national park known today as Biriwal Bulga.

== Region description ==
Biriwal Bulga is a 5,813-hectare national park on the northern edge of the Bulga plateau. It ranges in elevation from 130 m to 670 m above sea level. The landscape is predominantly dissected foothills, which contribute to its elevation. The most common rocks are mudstone and shale. Its average rainfall during the year ranges from 1300 to 1600 mm. If there is vegetation cover over the land, the rainfall can potentially cause erosion of soil.

The park has few visitors due to its remote location and lack of accessibility for two-wheel drive cars and bike tracks. There are no facilities or walking trails within the national park. The nearest recreational facilities are at Tapin Tops National Park and Ellenborough Falls at Elands.

=== Weelah Nature Reserve ===
Weelah Nature Reserve is situated in the southeast of Biriwal Bulga National Park, covering an area of 37 ha. It contains one of the few rainforest remnants on the Bulga Plateau.

== Biology and ecology ==
=== Fauna ===
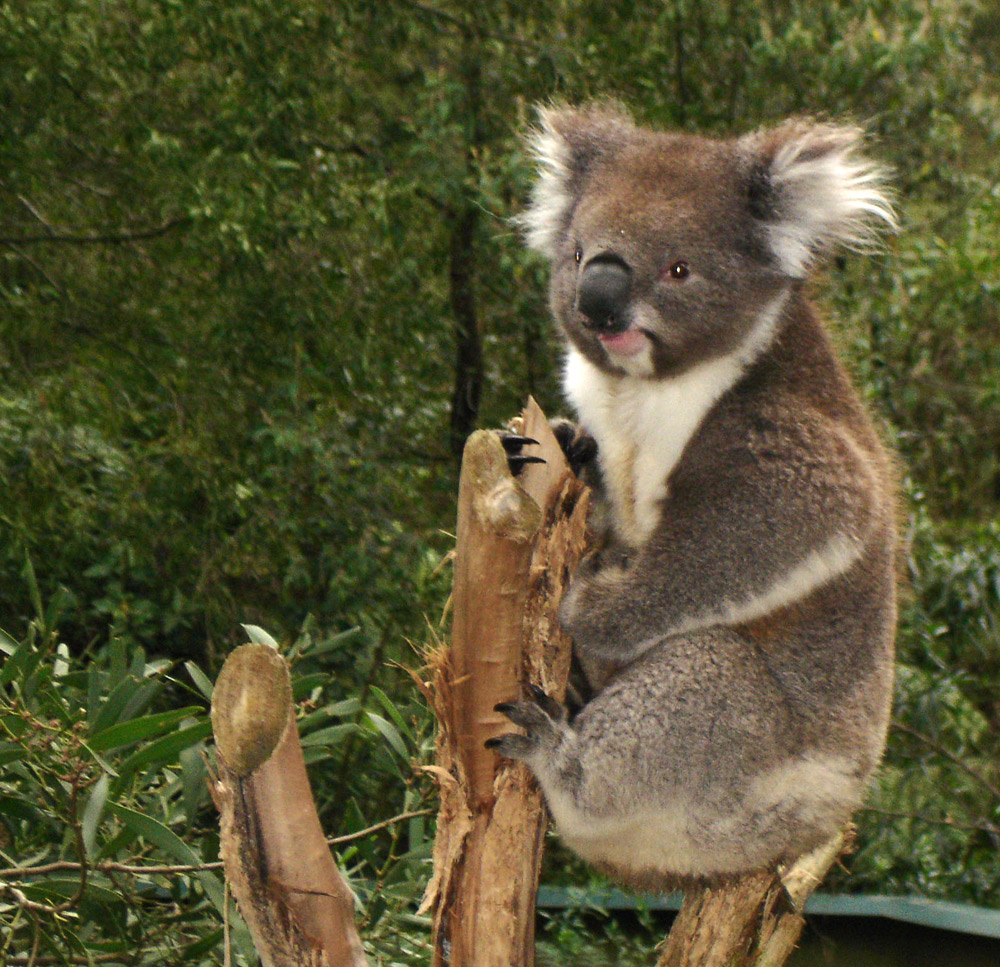
The koala, a native to Biriwal Bulga National Park

Seventy-four fauna species have been recorded in the area. Amongst these seventy-four species; according to NSW National Parks and Wildlife Service,

“the following are recorded as vulnerable and at risk of becoming endangered: powerful owl, glossy black cockatoo, fruit doves, spotted-tailed quoll, brush-tailed phascogale, yellow-bellied glider, koala, long-nosed potoroo, large bent-wing bat”.

The most common are koalas. Different subspecies of koalas interact with the natural flora forming the ecosystem within the park. These subspecies often roam and move from neighbouring regions into the park. An estimated 500–1000 individual koalas are recorded throughout the Biriwal Bulga region.

=== Flora ===
Sixteen types of plants have been recorded within Biriwal Bulga National Park. The predominant plants are dry sclerophyll forests. During its early discovery, the park was subject to selective logging for businesses due to its dense forests. The logging caused forest destruction and disturbed the natural ecosystem of the park.

The 1950s brought an end to all logging in the park, and the majority of the forest has now been restored. The Central Eastern Rainforest Reserves of Australia (CERRA) World Heritage Area has identified the park as a potential addition to its list as a development listing due to its undisturbed and intact rainforest. As of 2004, there were no recorded threatened plant species. Plectranthus suaveolens is listed as the only rare plant found in the park. The plants listed as endangered by the NSW Wildlife Services are vine (Cynanchum elegans) and ground orchid (Diuris flavescens).

=== Catchment ===
Biriwal Bulga National Park drains the majority of its rainfall into surrounding creeks which eventually lead to the Hastings River. The main nearby body of water is the Doyles River, which is approximately 6 km in length. This is found on the southeastern border of the park. Inside the park are two catchments of water, Green Gully Creek and Big Creek. The water that leaves the park supplies stock on some downstream farms and partially supplies Port Macquarie.

== Environmental threats ==
=== Pests ===
Biriwal Bulga National Park contains different animals, some of which are considered pests and disturb the natural ecosystem of the park. Pests sighted within the area include wild dogs, foxes, pigs and cats. The most prevalent danger are wild dogs, particularly dingoes. Dingoes pose threats to the native koala population within the national park. Their speed allows them to track and hunt koalas that have left their trees. Foxes and pigs are also a concern for the park's natural catchment. The pests' movement throughout the park can cause damage to the soil. This can lead to increased erosion which causes dirt to be run-off along with the water to the park's neighbouring catchments.

In addition to animal pests, there are also noxious plants and weeds which threaten to damage the habitat. In 1968–1969, a pine plantation plot was established as a trial for future pine plantation programs on the plateau. These pine trees have started to disperse to the surrounding areas outside their original allocation. This can cause problems if left uncontrolled as it damages the natural ecosystem of the park. There are also a number of pest plants which have invaded the park from the neighbouring Yarras Mountain Trail. The most common of these is in the genus Lantana.

=== Fires ===
Due to the area's dense forest, the park is susceptible to fires. These fires pose a threat to the wet sclerophyll communities which are abundant in the park. The fires have the capability to burn the rainforest and threaten the biodiversity within the park if they occur regularly. The main type of fire is vegetation fire, most commonly known as bushfire.

Biriwal Bulga National Park was one of the areas affected by the 2019–2020 bushfire season in Australia. The fire burned during the periods of mid-December to mid-January. Torrential rain and large thunderstorms helped firefighters to contain the spread throughout the park.

=== Bacteria ===
Within the National Park, there are some bacteria that pose potential problems to the wildlife which inhabit it. Chlamydia pecorum is a bacterial pathogen dangerous to the wildlife, in particular koalas. This pathogen is an infectious disease which harms koalas and potentially could cause fatality. It is dangerous due to the ease with which it spreads between individuals. As koalas move regularly from neighbouring regions into the national park, the spread of this disease is apparent in the park. There are management plans in place to restrict the influence of bacteria on the koala population within the park.

== Management ==
Biriwal Bulga National Park is recognised as an area of significant cultural importance to Indigenous Australians. Any discussion in plans of conservation must involve direct consultation with a member of the Biripi people. The Biripi people must be involved in negotiations of plans in order to maintain the Aboriginal heritage within the park. Currently there are nine recognised sites in Biriwal Bulga that are significant to the local Indigenous population. A further two potentially significant sites are being investigated with the help of the Indigenous community around Biriwal Bulga.

The issues of pests within the park have been identified by the NPWS Mid-North Coast regional pest management. They have included strategies such as preparing a mapping of areas within the park that display high activities of pest animals and plants. This allows for wildlife services to control the growth of pests, ensuring that they are kept only within those areas. The maps allow for services to plan for conservation sites and ensure that native species have minimal interactions with pests. There is a focus on park services to help control the pines surrounding the plantation area. This is to ensure the prevention of weeds spreading into the natural habitat.

Biriwal Bulga is recognised as a conservation site for koalas. The terrain and environment surrounding the park provide stability for steady growth of the koala population. The national park's lack of human visitors allows for the koalas to live peacefully and undisturbed. Research and surveys are conducted to ensure that the growth of koalas is being monitored. This is to ensure that koalas are not at risk of the potential bacteria that could cause a decrease in population.

Biriwal Bulga's dense forest are a concern for the bushfire seasons which occur in Australia. To preserve the national park's habitat, back-burning is a method that prevents fires from destroying the ecosystem. The NSW National Parks and Wildlife Services attempts to establish strong communication with the local Rural Fire Services to ensure a fire-free interval of land is maintained every 10 to 15 years.

To implement all the management plans mentioned above, easier access into the national park is required. NSW Wildlife Services plans to negotiate with relevant neighbours of the park for the development of safety tracks to ensure for easier access into the park. If this occurs, the park wishes to establish guidelines to ensure that visitors will not disturb the local ecosystem.

NSW Wildlife Services also plans to promote Biriwal Bulga as a remote location that offers visitors the experience to be self-reliant in nature. Facilities will not be developed and instead visitors will be encouraged to use the facilities offered by surrounding areas. This encouragement can be done through signs within the park or uploading information onto the park's website. Services plan to monitor activities of visitors to ensure that they are following guidelines set up to ensure the safety of both visitors and the park. Suggestions for monitoring activities include surveys of how many utilise the park as well as observing whether occupants have left belongings behind such as valuables or rubbish.

== See also ==
- Protected areas of New South Wales
