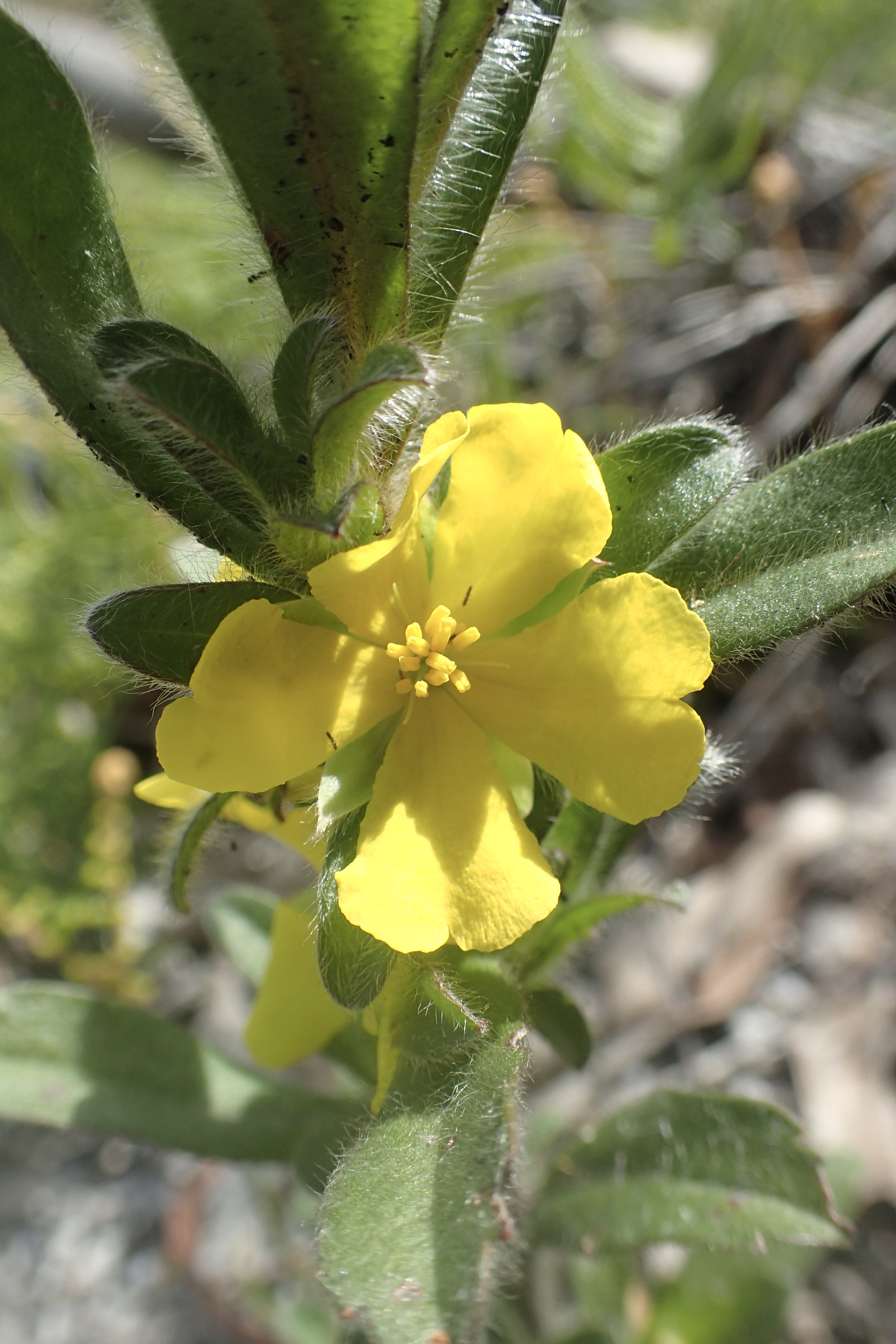

Scientific classification
- Kingdom: Plantae
- Clade: Tracheophytes
- Clade: Angiosperms
- Clade: Eudicots
- Order: Dilleniales
- Family: Dilleniaceae
- Genus: Hibbertia
- Species: H. villosa

Binomial name
- Hibbertia villosa B.J.Conn

= Hibbertia villosa =

Species of flowering plant

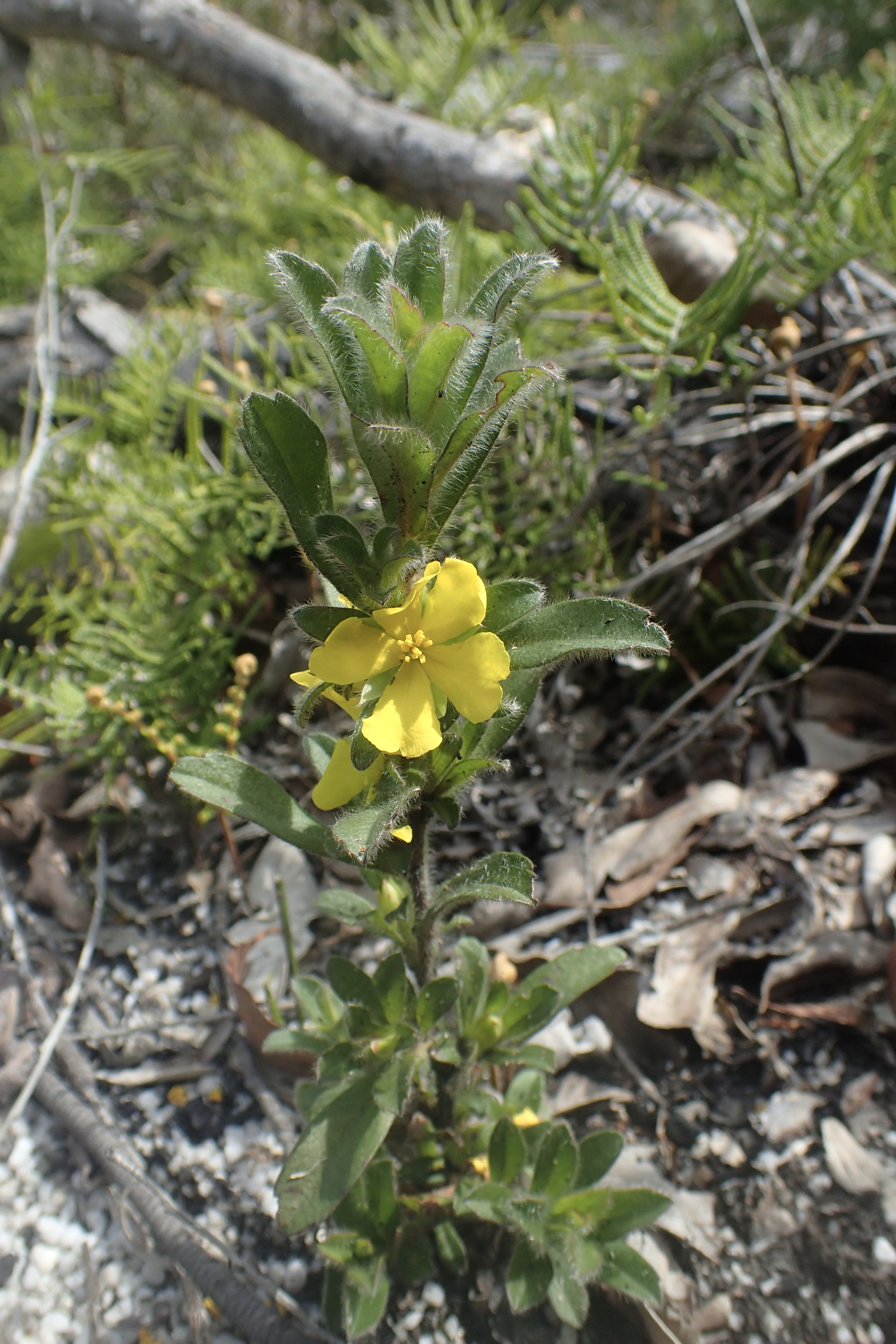
Habit in the Gibraltar Range National Park

Hibbertia villosa is a species of flowering plant in the family Dilleniaceae and is endemic to northern New South Wales. It is an erect shrub with hairy branches and leaves, spatula-shaped to narrow egg-shaped leaves with the narrower end towards the base and yellow flowers with fifteen to twenty stamens in three groups arranged around three carpels.

== Description ==
Hibbertia villosa is an erect shrub that typically grows to a height of up to 50 cm (20 in) and has its branches and leaves covered with whitish hairs up to 3 mm (0.12 in) long. The leaves are spatula-shaped to egg-shaped with the narrower end towards the base, 7–25 mm (0.28–0.98 in) long, 3–10 mm (0.12–0.39 in) wide and sessile. The flowers are arranged in leaf axils and are sessile with hairy bracts about 1.5 mm (0.059 in) long at the base. The sepals are narrow egg-shaped, 6.3–9 mm (0.25–0.35 in) long, the petals yellow, spatula-shaped, 10–23 mm (0.39–0.91 in) long and 7–10 mm (0.28–0.39 in) wide. There are usually fifteen to twenty stamens arranged in three groups around three glabrous carpels. Flowering occurs from August to November.

== Taxonomy ==
Hibbertia villosa was first formally described in 1990 by Barry Conn in the journal Muelleria from specimens collected in the Gibraltar Range National Park in 1974.

== Distribution and habitat ==
This hibbertia grows in open forest from the Gibraltar Range National Park to Werrikimbe National Park in northern New South Wales.
