= Doyles River (New South Wales) =

Coordinates: 31°32′S 152°21′E

Doyles River Big Hill Creek

Location
- Country: Australia
- State: New South Wales
- Region: NSW North Coast (IBRA), Mid North Coast
- Local government areas: Port Macquarie-Hastings

Physical characteristics
- Source: Great Dividing Range
  - location: southeast of Tobins Creek
- Mouth: confluence with the Ellenborough River
  - location: southwest of Ellenborough

Basin features
- River system: Hastings River catchment
- National parks: Tapin Tops, Biriwal Bulga

Doyles River, a perennial river of the Hastings River catchment, is located in the Mid North Coast region of New South Wales, Australia.

== Course and features ==
Doyles River rises on the eastern slopes of the Great Dividing Range, southeast of Tobins Creek, and flows generally south southeast, northeast, and then southeast, before reaching its confluence with the Ellenborough River, southwest of Ellenborough.

== See also ==
- Rivers of New South Wales
- List of rivers of Australia
