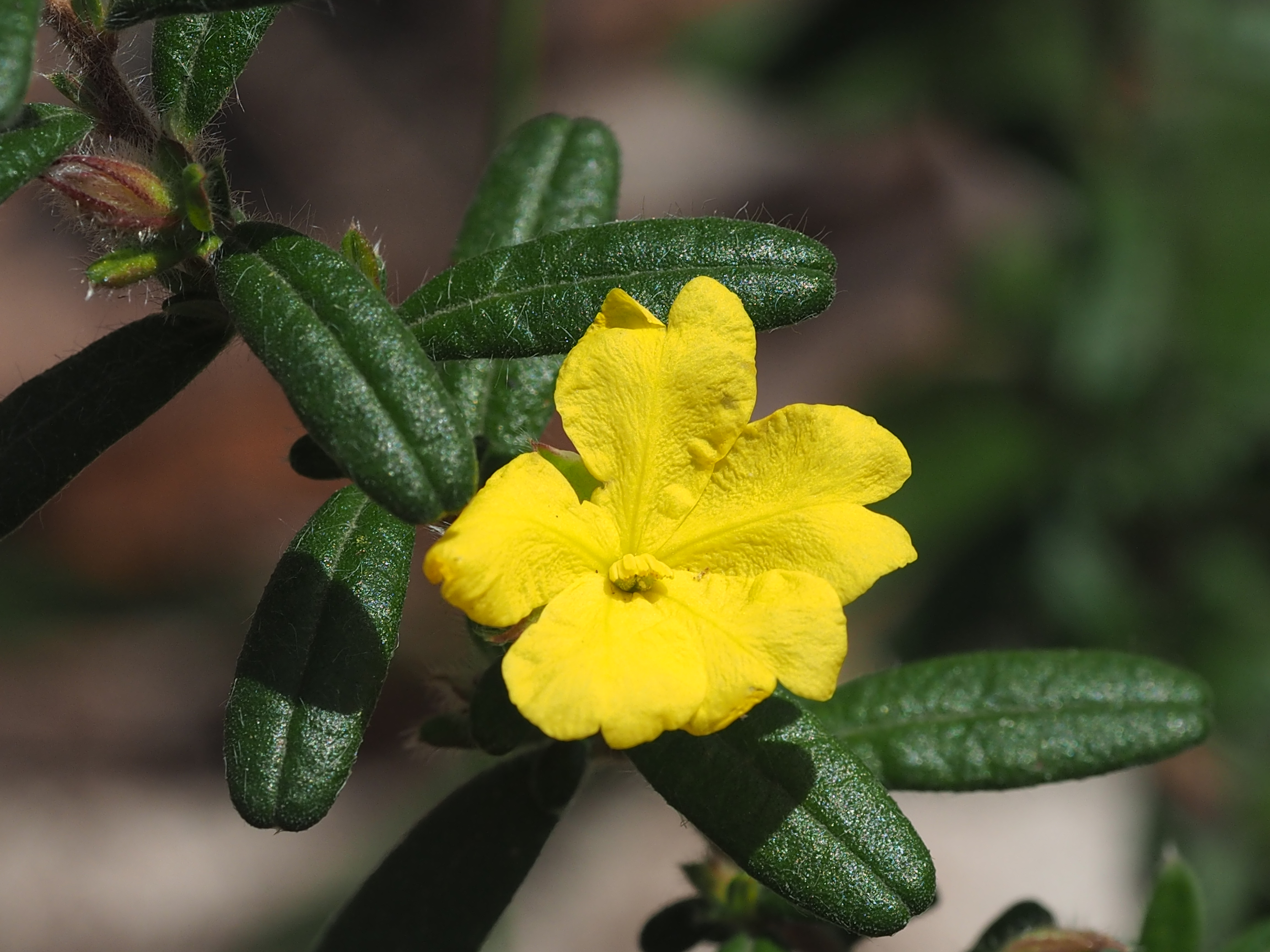

Scientific classification
- Kingdom: Plantae
- Clade: Tracheophytes
- Clade: Angiosperms
- Clade: Eudicots
- Order: Dilleniales
- Family: Dilleniaceae
- Genus: Hibbertia
- Species: H. rhynchocalyx

Binomial name
- Hibbertia rhynchocalyx Toelken

= Hibbertia rhynchocalyx =

Species of flowering plant

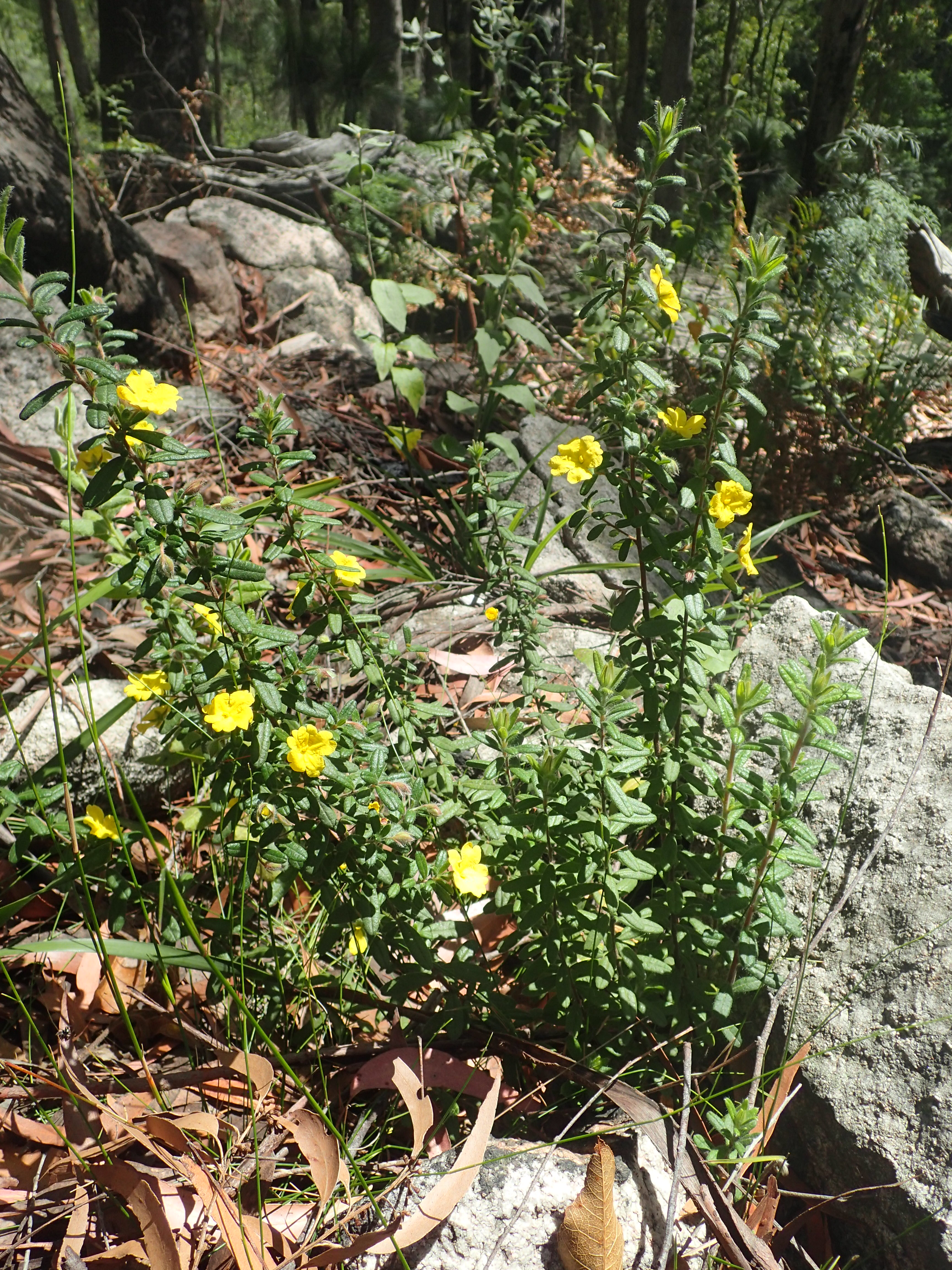
Near The Needles lookout in the Gibraltar Range National Park

Hibbertia rhynchocalyx is a species of flowering plant in the family Dilleniaceae and is endemic to the Gibraltar Range National Park in eastern Australia. It is a low shrub with hairy foliage, oblong leaves and yellow flowers with twelve stamens joined at the base on one side of two hairy carpels.

== Description ==
Hibbertia rhynchocalyx is a low shrub with spreading, hairy branches. The leaves are more or less oblong, 7–22 mm (0.28–0.87 in) long, 3–7 mm (0.12–0.28 in) wide on a petiole 0.5–2 mm (0.020–0.079 in) long, and covered with both long, simple hairs and short, star-like hairs. The flowers are mainly arranged singly on the ends of side shoots on a peduncle 3.2–6.4 mm (0.13–0.25 in) long with a linear bracts 4.4–5.1 mm (0.17–0.20 in) long at the base. The five sepal are joined at the base, the outer lobes 4.8–6.1 mm (0.19–0.24 in) long, the inner lobes slightly shorter. The petals are yellow, egg-shaped with the narrower end towards the base or spatula-shaped, 4.5–6.6 mm (0.18–0.26 in) long with twelve stamens joined at the base, on one side of the two carpels, each carpel with two ovules. Flowering mostly occurs in October.

== Taxonomy ==
Hibbertia rhynchocalyx was first formally described in 1998 by Hellmut R. Toelken in the Journal of the Adelaide Botanic Gardens from specimens collected by John Beaumont Williams and Keith Winterhalder in the Gibraltar Range National Park.

== Distribution and habitat ==
This hibbertia grows on east-facing slopes, usually in Eucalyptus resinifera forest, in the Gibraltar National Park in north-eastern New South Wales.

== See also ==
- List of Hibbertia species
