= Tobins River =

Coordinates: 31°09′S 152°50′E

Tobins River Tobins Creek

Location
- Country: Australia
- State: New South Wales
- IBRA: NSW North Coast
- District: Northern Tablelands, Mid North Coast
- local government area: Walcha

Physical characteristics
- Source: Mount Seaview, Great Dividing Range
  - location: within Cottan-Bimbang National Park, near Myrtle Scrub
  - elevation: 1,200 m (3,900 ft)
- Mouth: confluence with the Hastings River
  - location: west of Birdwood
  - elevation: 141 m (463 ft)
- Length: 35 km (22 mi)

Basin features
- River system: Hastings River catchment
- National park: Cottan-Bimbang

Tobins River, a perennial stream of the Hastings River catchment, is located in the Northern Tablelands and Mid North Coast districts of New South Wales, Australia.

== Course and features ==
Tobins River rises below Mount Seaview, on the south-eastern slopes of the Great Dividing Range within Cotton Bimbang National Park, near the village of Myrtle Scrub, and flows generally east southeast, before reaching its confluence with the Hastings River, west of Birdwood. The river descends 1,060 metres (3,480 ft) over its 35 kilometres (22 mi) course.

== See also ==
- Rivers of New South Wales
- List of rivers of New South Wales (L-Z)
- List of rivers of Australia
