= Forbes River (New South Wales) =

Coordinates: 31°19′S 152°19′E

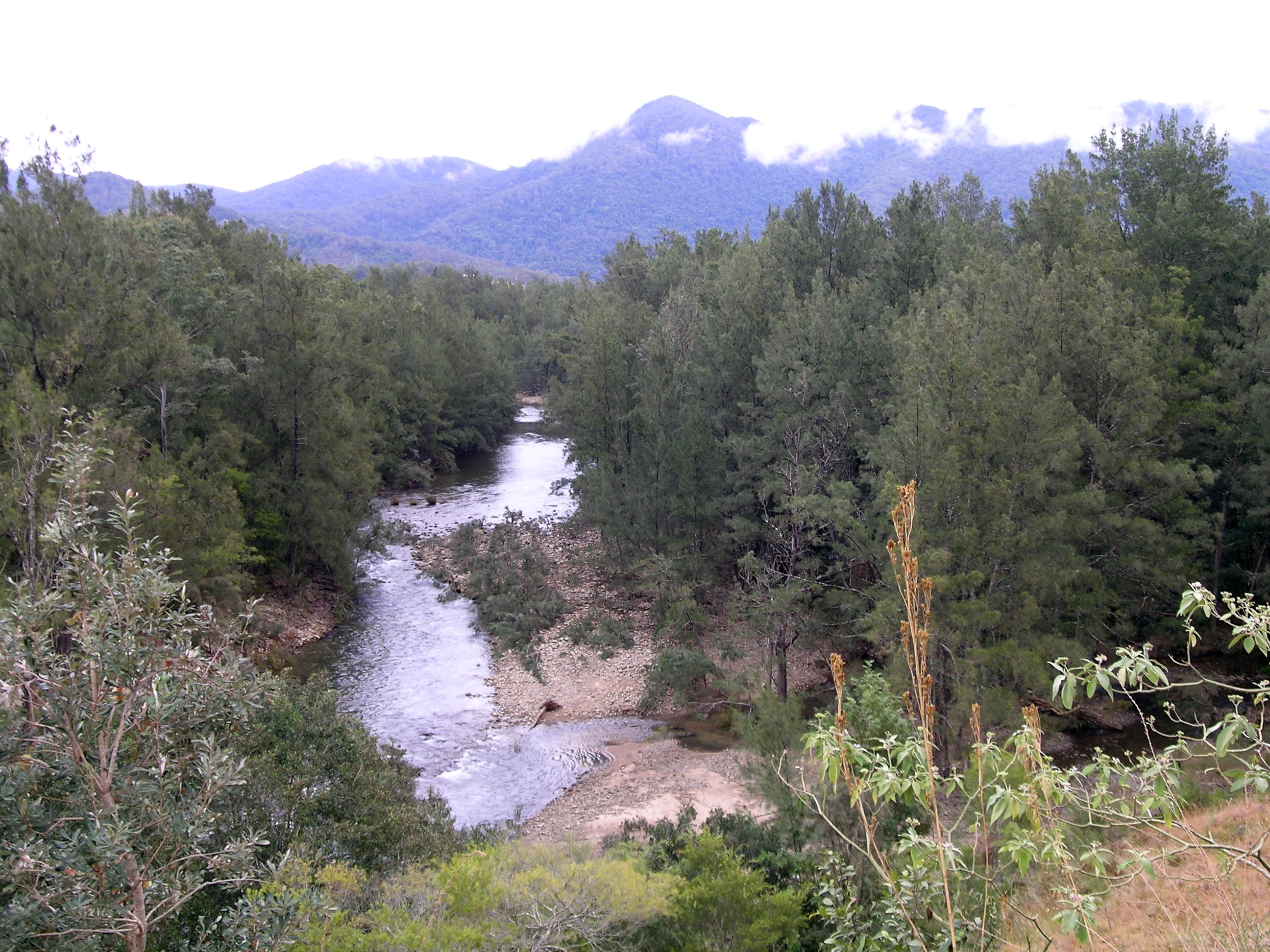
- Forbes River, viewed from the Forbes River Road.
- Etymology: In honour of Francis Forbes

Location
- Country: Australia
- State: New South Wales
- IBRA: NSW North Coast
- District: Mid North Coast
- Local government area: Port Macquarie-Hastings

Physical characteristics
- Source: west of Spokes Mountain in Abbotsmith Ridge, Great Dividing Range
  - location: Willi Willi National Park
  - elevation: 1,060 m (3,480 ft)
- Mouth: confluence with the Hastings River
  - location: near Yarras
  - elevation: 95 m (312 ft)
- Length: 53 km (33 mi)

Basin features
- River system: Hastings River catchment
- National parks: Willi Willi, Werrikimbe

Forbes River, a perennial river of the Hastings River catchment, is located in the Mid North Coast region of New South Wales, Australia.

== Course and features ==
The Forbes River originates west of Spokes Mountain, on the northern slopes of Abbotsmith Ridge in the Great Dividing Range, located within Willi Willi National Park. It then flows southward and eventually joins the Hastings River near Yarras. The river spans a distance of 53 kilometres (33 mi) and descends 965 metres (3,166 ft) in elevation over its course.

The river was named by Surveyor-General John Oxley in tribute to Francis Forbes, who later became the first Chief Justice of the NSW Supreme Court.

The areas surrounding the Forbes River have been significant for logging timber, and several sawmills were operational along the river. In the past, the lower reaches of the river were utilized for dairy farming, but currently, these farms primarily rear beef cattle. The Forbes River is also home to a variety of wildlife, including dingos, carpet pythons, and goannas in certain sections.

== See also ==
- Rivers of New South Wales
- List of rivers of New South Wales (A–K)
- List of rivers of Australia
