= Pappinbarra River =

Coordinates: 31°21′S 152°28′E

Pappinbarra River Pappinbarra Creek, Left Arm of Pappinbarra Creek

Location
- Country: Australia
- State: New South Wales
- IBRA: NSW North Coast
- District: Mid North Coast
- local government area: Port Macquarie-Hastings

Physical characteristics
- Source: Mount Boss, Gibraltar Range
  - location: northwest of Pappinbarra Junction, New South Wales
  - elevation: 392 m (1,286 ft)
- Mouth: confluence with the Hastings River
  - location: near Beechwood, New South Wales
  - elevation: 16 m (52 ft)
- Length: 62 km (39 mi)

Basin features
- River system: Hastings River catchment
- National park: Werrikimbe NP

The Pappinbarra River, a perennial stream of the Hastings River catchment, is located in the Mid North Coast region of New South Wales, Australia.

== Course and features ==
The Pappinbarra River rises below Mount Boss on the slopes of the Gibraltar Range within the Werrikimbe National Park, northwest of Pappinbarra Junction, New South Wales, and flows generally southeast before reaching its confluence with the Hastings River, near Beechwood. The river descends 376 metres (1,234 ft) over its 58 kilometres (36 mi) course.

== See also ==
- List of rivers of Australia
