= Ellenborough River =

Coordinates: 31°26′S 152°28′E

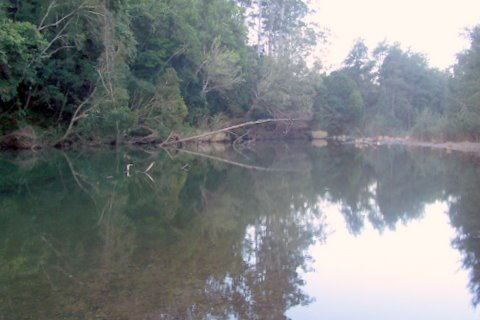
- Ellenborough River downstream of Ellenborough Falls.

Location
- Country: Australia
- State: New South Wales
- Region: NSW North Coast (IBRA), Mid North Coast
- Local government areas: Port Macquarie-Hastings

Physical characteristics
- Source: Great Dividing Range
  - location: southwest of Blue Knob
  - elevation: 772 m (2,533 ft)
- Mouth: confluence with the Hastings River
  - location: near Ellenborough
  - elevation: 55 m (180 ft)
- Length: 70 km (43 mi)

Basin features
- River system: Hastings River catchment
- National parks: Tapin Tops, Biriwal Bulga

Ellenborough River, a perennial river of the Hastings River catchment, is located in the Mid North Coast region of New South Wales, Australia.

== Course and features ==
Ellenborough River rises on the eastern slopes of the Great Dividing Range, southwest of Blue Knob, and flows generally northeast before reaching its confluence with the Hastings River, near Ellenborough. The river descends 717 metres (2,352 ft) over its 70 kilometres (43 mi) course.

The river descends over Ellenborough Falls, a sheer drop of circa 160 metres (520 ft), located on the middle reaches of the river, south of Biriwal Bulga National Park.

== See also ==
- Rivers of New South Wales
- List of rivers of Australia
