= Ralfes Creek =

Coordinates: 31°15′S 152°50′E

Ralfes Creek Sheepstation Creek, Ralfes Rivulet

Location
- Country: Australia
- State: New South Wales
- Region: NSW North Coast (IBRA), Mid North Coast
- Local government area: Port Macquarie-Hastings

Physical characteristics
- Source: Great Dividing Range
  - location: Doyles River State Forest
  - elevation: 869 m (2,851 ft)
- Mouth: confluence with the Hastings River
  - location: near Ellenborough
  - elevation: 115 m (377 ft)
- Length: 28 km (17 mi)

Basin features
- River system: Hastings River catchment

The Ralfes Creek, a perennial stream that is part of the Hastings River catchment, is located in the Mid North Coast region of New South Wales, Australia.

== Course and features ==
Ralfes Creek rises within the Great Dividing Range, about 1.2 kilometres (0.75 mi) northeast of the Oxley Trigonometrical Station, within the Doyles River State Forest. The river flows generally southeast, northeast, southeast, and then north northeast before reaching its confluence with the Hastings River west of the locality of Ellenborough. The river descends 754 metres (2,474 ft) over its 28 kilometres (17 mi) course.

The Oxley Highway transverses the river near its confluence with the Hastings River.

== See also ==
- Rivers of New South Wales
- List of rivers of New South Wales (L-Z)
- List of rivers of Australia
