= Dennis Bridge =

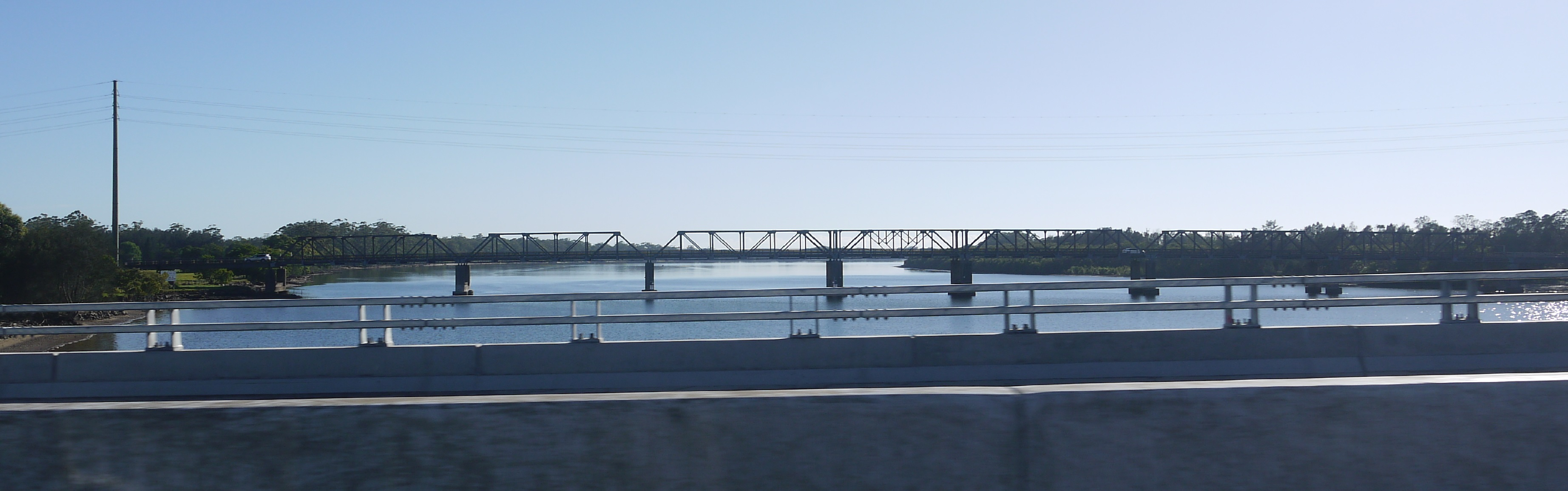
- View of Dennis Bridge, looking east from the new Hastings River Bridge in November 2017
- Coordinates: 31°24′31″S 152°49′18″E
- Carries: Hastings River Drive
- Crosses: Hastings River
- Locale: Port Macquarie, New South Wales, Australia
- Named for: Spencer Dennis
- Owner: Port Macquarie-Hastings Council
- Preceded by: Hastings River Bridge

Characteristics
- Design: Truss bridge
- Material: Steel
- Total length: 468 metres (1,535 ft)
- Longest span: 37 metres (121 ft)
- No. of spans: 7
- No. of lanes: 2 traffic; 1 pedestrian

History
- Opened: December 1961
- Replaces: Blackmans Point ferry
- Replaced by: Hastings River Bridge (November 2017)

The Dennis Bridge is a steel truss road bridge that carries Hastings River Drive across the Hastings River, near Port Macquarie, New South Wales, Australia. The bridge carried the Pacific Highway from December 1961 until November 2017, when it was replaced by the (new) Hastings River Bridge, a concrete road bridge. The Dennis Bridge is managed by the Port Macquarie-Hastings Council.

== History ==
The Dennis Bridge was opened in December 1961 as part of a project to replace the Blackmans Point ferry across the Hastings River and to bypass Port Macquarie. As well as the Dennis Bridge, this project included a 10-kilometre (6 mi) deviation of the Pacific Highway and a three-kilometre (two-mile) connecting road from the old to the new highway route, Hastings River Drive.

The bridge was named after Department of Main Roads engineer Spencer Dennis, and is one of a series of steel truss bridges of standardised design erected by the Department of Main Roads in the 1950s and 1960s, predominantly across the wide coastal rivers of New South Wales.

== Description ==
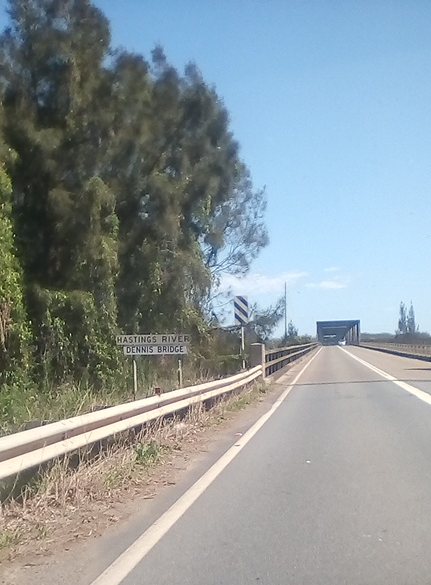
Approaches to the Dennis Bridge in 2018

The Dennis Bridge has a total length of 468 metres (1,535 ft), and consists of six 37-metre (121 ft) truss spans and one 25.6-metre (84 ft) truss span, as well as ten steel plate girder approach spans. The deck carries two lanes of traffic and a footway.

Three of the truss spans form a continuous truss, with the central of these three spans (of 25.6 metres (84 ft)) being designed for conversion to a lift span. However this has never occurred.

On 17 November 2017, a new bridge carrying the Pacific Highway across the Hastings River officially opened to traffic. Located to the west of the Dennis Bridge, the new bridge is part of the 18-kilometre-long (11 mi) Oxley Highway to Kundabung upgrade project. The Dennis Bridge remains in use for local traffic, as part of the northern access from the rerouted Pacific Highway at Blackman's Point interchange to Port Macquarie, managed by the Port Macquarie-Hastings Council.
