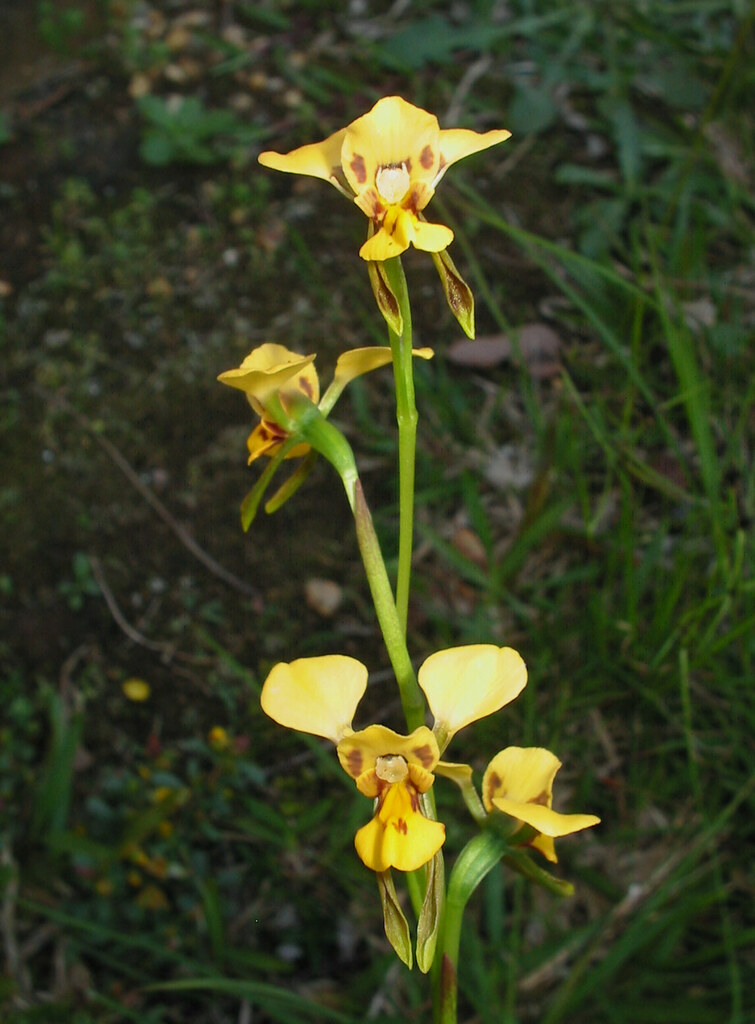

Conservation status
- Critically endangered (EPBC Act)

Scientific classification
- Kingdom: Plantae
- Clade: Tracheophytes
- Clade: Angiosperms
- Clade: Monocots
- Order: Asparagales
- Family: Orchidaceae
- Subfamily: Orchidoideae
- Tribe: Diurideae
- Genus: Diuris
- Species: D. flavescens

Binomial name
- Diuris flavescens D.L.Jones

= Diuris flavescens =

Pale yellow doubletail

Species of orchid

Diuris flavescens, commonly called the pale yellow doubletail or Wingham doubletail, is a species of orchid which is endemic to a small area in New South Wales. It has two linear leaves at its base and up to five pale yellow flowers with dark brown markings. Fewer than 200 plants survive in grassy forest near Wingham.

== Description ==
Diuris flavescens is a tuberous, perennial herb with two linear leaves 80–170 mm (3–7 in) long, 3–4 mm (0.1–0.2 in) wide and folded lengthwise. Up to five pale yellow flowers with dark brown markings, 12 mm (0.5 in) wide are borne on a flowering stem 100–200 mm (4–8 in) tall. The dorsal sepal projects forward and is narrow egg-shaped, 6–9 mm (0.2–0.4 in) long and 4–5 mm (0.16–0.20 in) wide. It is yellow with greenish brown and reddish brown blotches. The lateral sepals are lance-shaped with the narrower end towards the base, green and brown, 12–18 mm (0.5–0.7 in) long, 1–2 mm (0.04–0.08 in) wide, turned downwards and parallel to, or crossed over each other. The petals are more or less erect, spread apart from each other with an elliptic to almost circular blade 6–9 mm (0.2–0.4 in) long and 4–5 mm (0.16–0.20 in) wide on a curved, green to brown stalk 4–6 mm (0.16–0.24 in) long. The labellum is 6–8 mm (0.2–0.3 in) long and has three lobes. The centre lobe is egg-shaped, 4.5–6.5 mm (0.2–0.3 in) wide with reddish brown markings and folded lengthwise. The side lobes are linear to narrow egg-shaped, 2–3 mm (0.08–0.1 in) long and about 1 mm (0.04 in) wide. There are two ridge-like calli about 5 mm (0.20 in) long near the base of the mid-line of the base of the labellum. Flowering occurs in September and October.

== Taxonomy and naming ==
Diuris flavescens was first formally described in 1991 by David Jones from a specimen collected south-east of Wingham and the description was published in Australian Orchid Research. The specific epithet (flavescens) is a Latin word meaning "pale yellow", referring to the colour of the flowers of this species.

== Distribution and habitat ==
The pale yellow doubletail grows in grassy forest in the Wingham district.

== Conservation ==
Diuris flavescens is classified as "critically endangered" under the Australian government Environment Protection and Biodiversity Conservation Act 1999 and the New South Wales Biodiversity Conservation Act 2016. The main threats to the species are illegal collecting, weed invasion and habitat disturbance. The staff at the Australian Botanic Garden Mount Annan are working to secure the future of the species by growing it from collected seed with the fungus required by the orchid.
