= Hastings River =

River in New South Wales, Australia

Hastings River Mooraback Creek
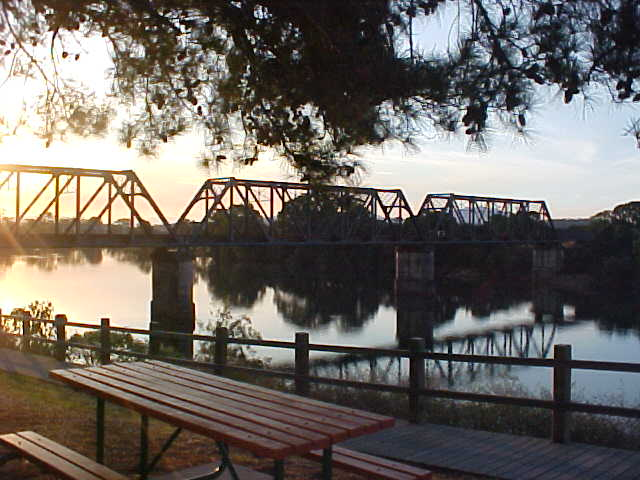
- North Coast railway bridge over the Hastings River at Wauchope
- Etymology: In honour of 1st Marquess of Hastings
- Native name: Doongang (Birrpayi)

Location
- Country: Australia
- State: New South Wales
- IBRA: New England Tablelands, NSW North Coast
- District: Northern Tablelands, Mid North Coast
- local government area: Port Macquarie-Hastings

Physical characteristics
- Source: Great Dividing Range
  - location: southwest of Kemps Pinnacle, within Oxley Wild Rivers National Park
  - coordinates: 31°25′54″S 152°22′4″E
  - elevation: 1,040 m (3,410 ft)
- Mouth: Tasman Sea, South Pacific Ocean
  - location: Port Macquarie
  - coordinates: 31°25′48″S 152°55′12″E
  - elevation: 0 m (0 ft)
- Length: 180 km (110 mi)
- Basin size: 3,658 km^{2} (1,412 sq mi)
- Discharge
  - location: Near mouth
  - average: 46.6 m^{3}/s (1,470 GL/a)

Basin features
- Tributaries
  - left: Forbes River, Pappinbarra River, Mortons Creek, Maria River
  - right: Fenwicks Creek, Tobins River, Ralfes Creek, Ellenborough River, Thone River
- National Parks: Oxley Wild Rivers, Werrikimbe, Cottan-Bimbang

Hastings River (Birpai: Doongang), an open and trained intermediate wave dominated barrier estuary, is located in the Northern Tablelands and Mid North Coast districts of New South Wales, Australia.

== Course and features ==
Hastings River rises in the Great Dividing Range, southwest of Kemps Pinnacle, in the area surrounding Oxley Wild Rivers National Park and Werrikimbe National Park and flows generally south, southeast and east, joined by six tributaries including the Tobins, Forbes, Ellenborough, Pappinbarra, Maria and Thone rivers, before reaching its mouth, flowing into the Tasman Sea of the South Pacific Ocean, at Port Macquarie. The river descends 1,040 metres (3,410 ft) over its 180 kilometres (110 mi) course.

The course of the river flows adjacent to the settlements Ellenborough, Long Flat, Beechwood, Wauchope and Port Macquarie. The Oxley Highway is generally aligned with the middle and lower reaches of the river. West of Port Macquarie, the Pacific Highway crosses the Hastings River.

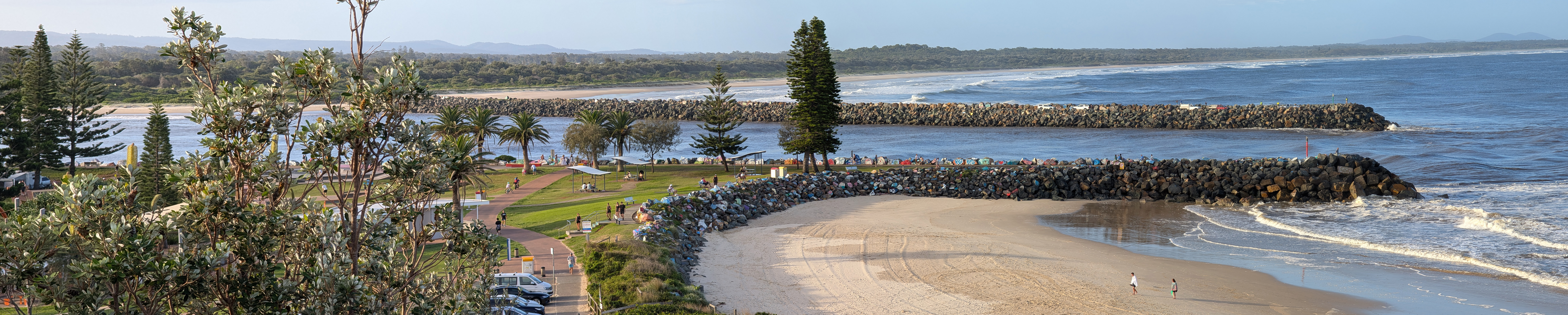
Panoramic view of the mouth of the Hastings River between the North Wall and South Wall, at Port Macquarie, New South Wales, with Town Beach in right foreground

== History ==
The Hastings River has been inhabited by Birpai Aboriginal people for thousands of years, who knew it as Doongang.

The river was first charted by European explorers in 1818, after being sighted by John Oxley. He named the river the Hastings River for the then Governor-General of India, Francis Rawdon-Hastings, 1st Marquess of Hastings.

On 19 November 2002, two anglers found the dismembered body of murdered Sydney drug dealer, Terry Falconer. Investigations revealed that Falconer had died three days beforehand, after his corpse had been cut up and dumped in the Hastings River by Anthony Perish and his criminal gang associates.

The River flooded in March 2021 during a severe weather event affecting much of New South Wales.

== Recreation, flora and fauna ==
The Hastings River gives its name to the Hastings River wine region and to an endangered species of mammal, the Hastings River Mouse (Pseudomys oralis).

Fishing opportunities on the Hastings River exist for freshwater bass and catfish in the upper reaches to estuarine species such as bream, flathead and luderick near the river mouth.

== See also ==
- Rivers of New South Wales
- List of rivers in New South Wales (A-K)
- List of rivers of Australia

== Gallery ==
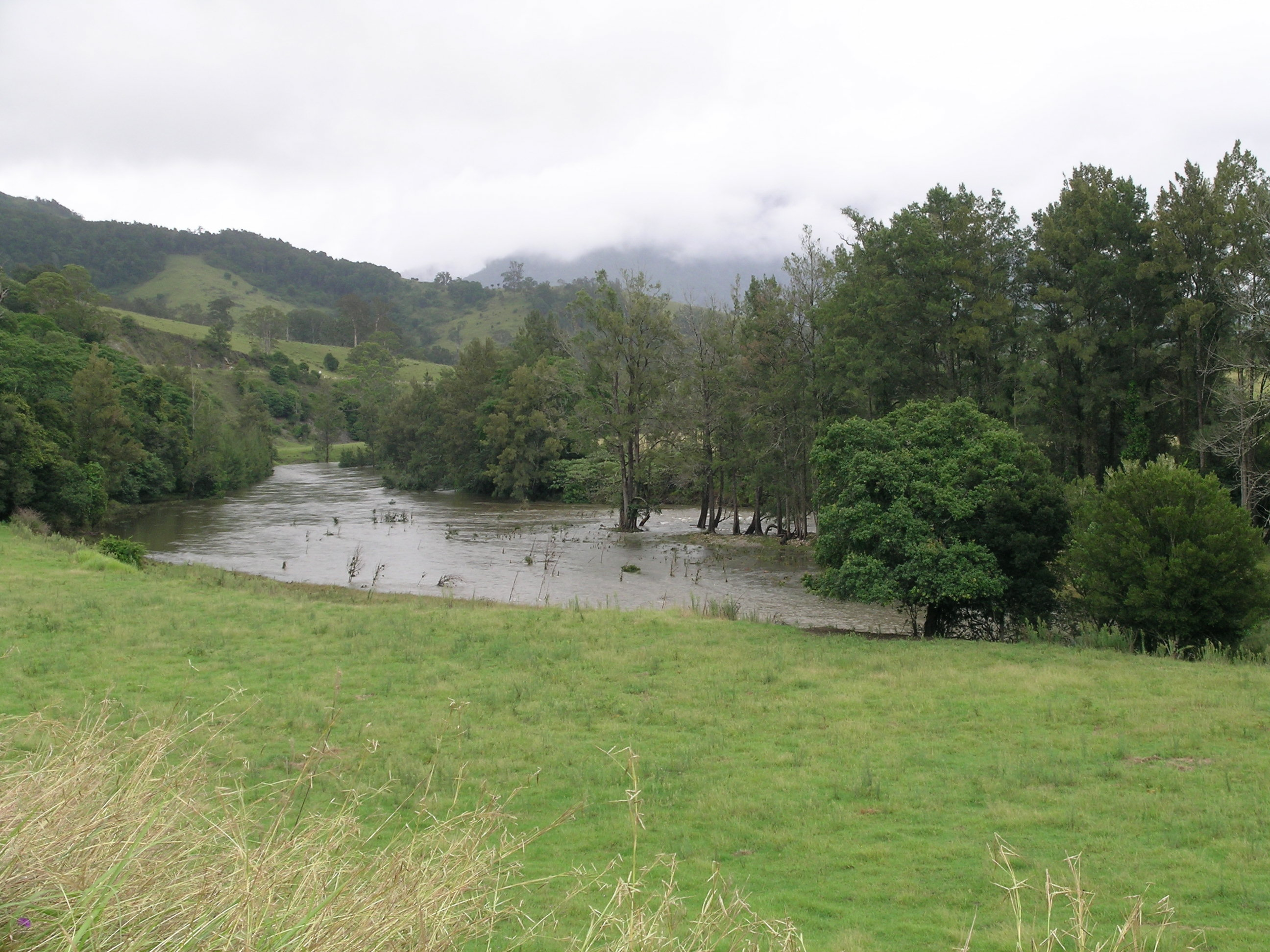
Hastings River, flooded, west of Ellenborough, 2009.

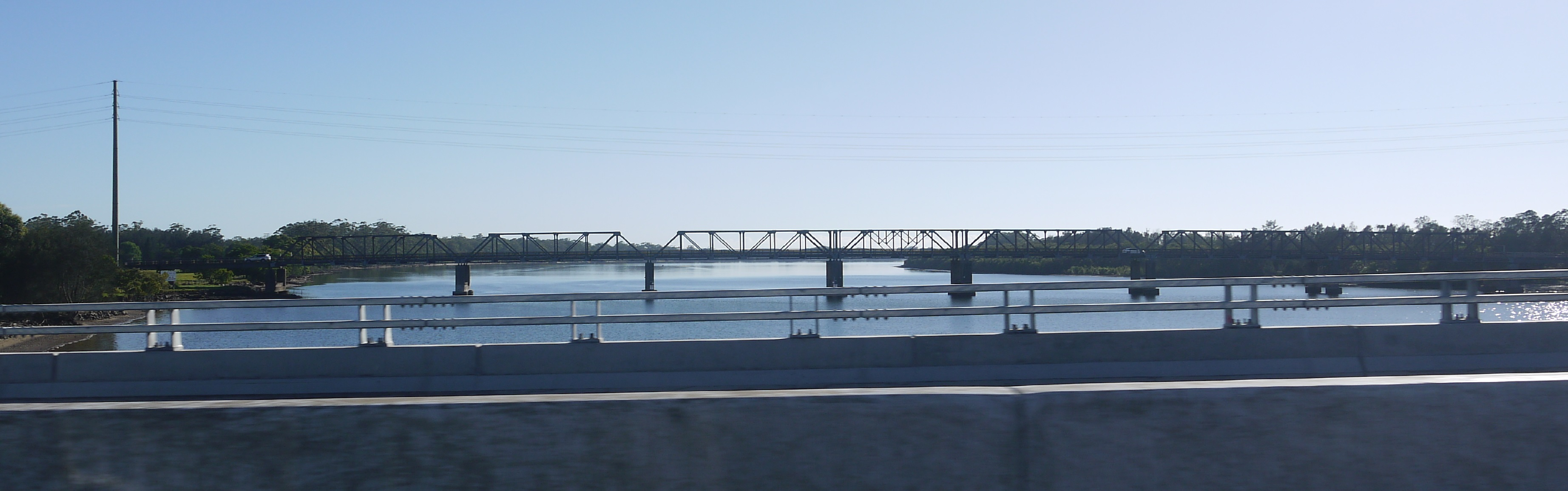
Dennis Bridge from the new Pacific Highway bridge to the west

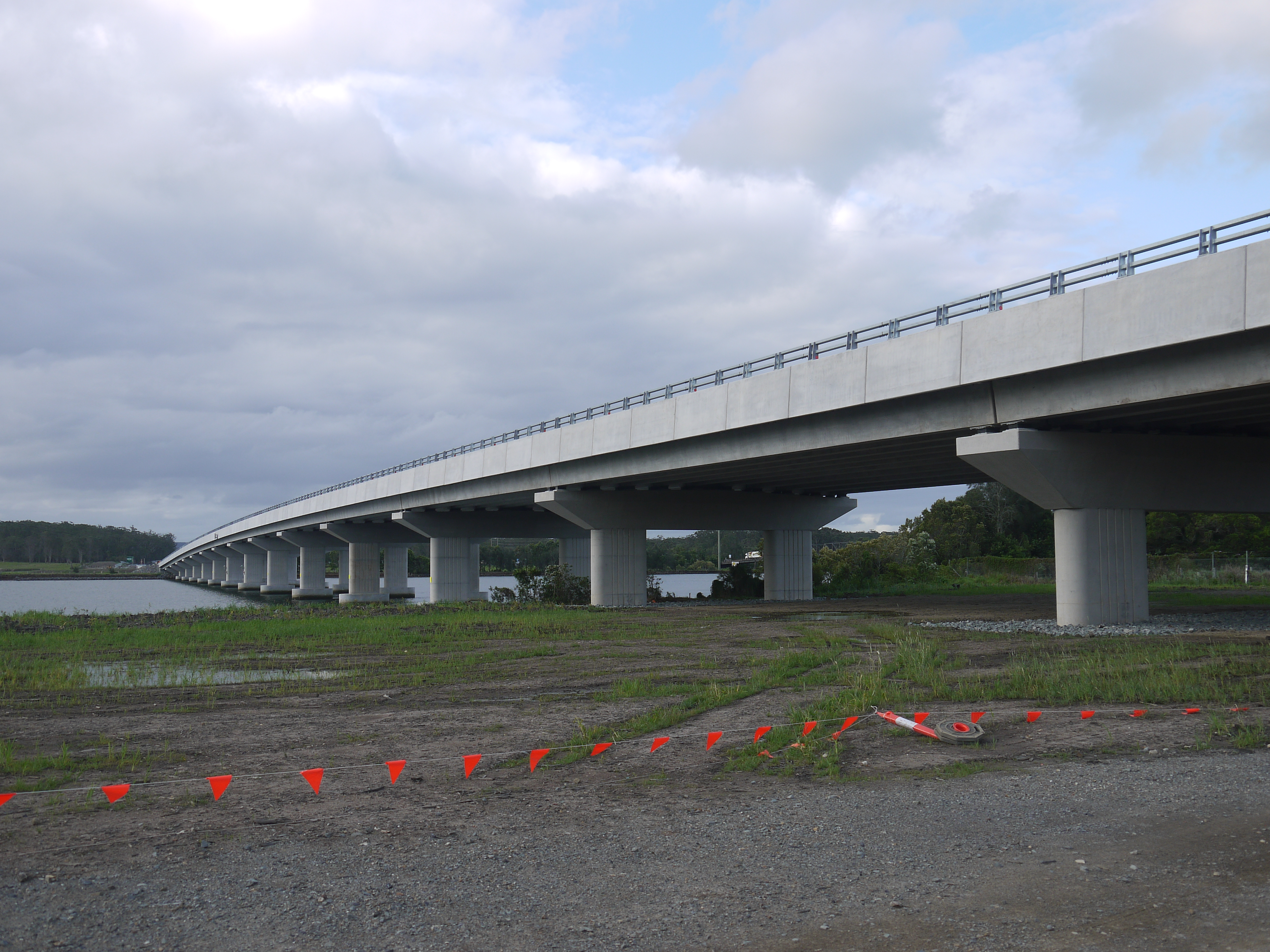
New Hastings River Bridge carrying the Pacific Highway
