= Cottan-Bimbang National Park =

National park in New South Wales, Australia

- IUCN category II (national park)
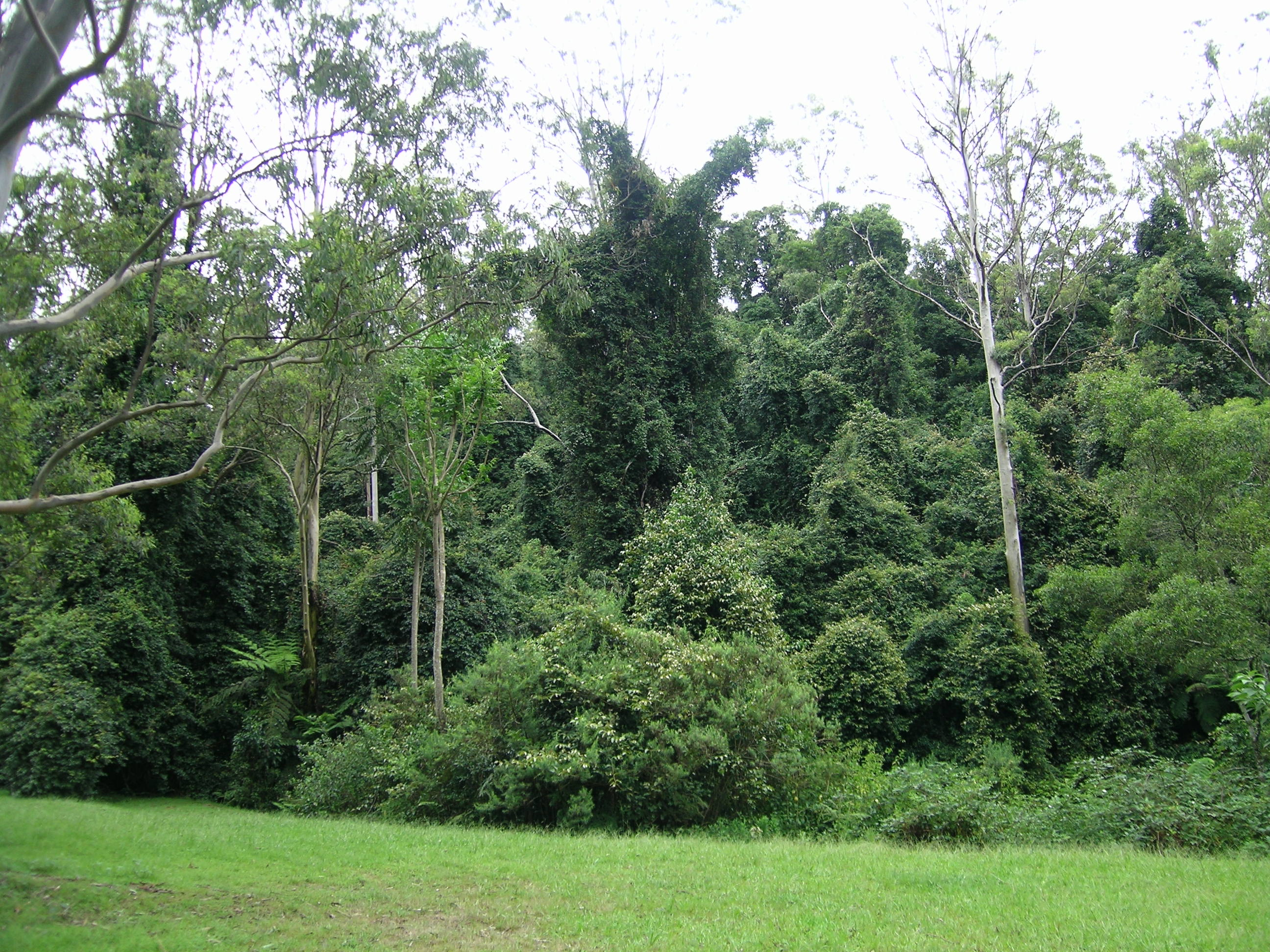
- Rainforest in Cottan-Bimbang National Park at the Stockyard Creek picnic area

- Location within New South Wales
- Location: New South Wales
- Nearest city: Walcha
- Coordinates: 31°21′02″S 152°08′02″E
- Area: 269 km^{2} (104 sq mi)
- Established: 1999
- Governing body: NSW National Parks & Wildlife Service
- Website: http://www.nationalparks.nsw.gov.au

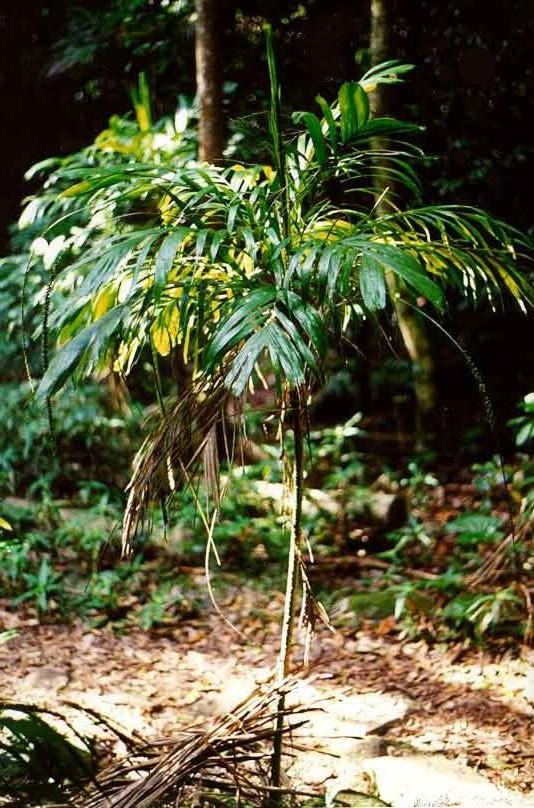
Linospadix monostachya (walking stick palm)

Cottan-Bimbang is a national park in New South Wales, Australia, 443 km north of Sydney and 65 km south east of Walcha and was formerly a state forest. The Oxley Highway crosses the park south of Werrikimbe National Park. Myrtle Scrub Road is a 15-kilometre circuit in the west of the park that connects with the Oxley Highway.

== Flora and fauna ==
This park is situated on the eastern escarpment with extensive tall old-growth eucalypt forest, rainforest, threatened frog species, yellow-bellied gliders (Petaurus australis) and koalas. 'Cottan-bimbang' is the local Aboriginal word for the walking stick palm (Linospadix monostachyos), which grows in the park's temperate rainforests.

Blackberries (Rubus) are creating a serious weed problem in the park.

There is a barbecue area, picnic area and public toilets at Stockyard Creek on the Oxley Highway and a cleared area for picnics next to Cells River on Myrtle Scrub Road. There is a cleared area for camping at Maxwells Flat on the Causeway Road, and a long drop toilet.

== See also ==
- Protected areas of New South Wales

== See also ==
- Cottan-Bimbang National Park travel guide from Wikivoyage
- Media related to Cottan-Bimbang National Park at Wikimedia Commons
