= Gibraltar Range National Park =

National park in Australia

- IUCN category Ib (wilderness area)
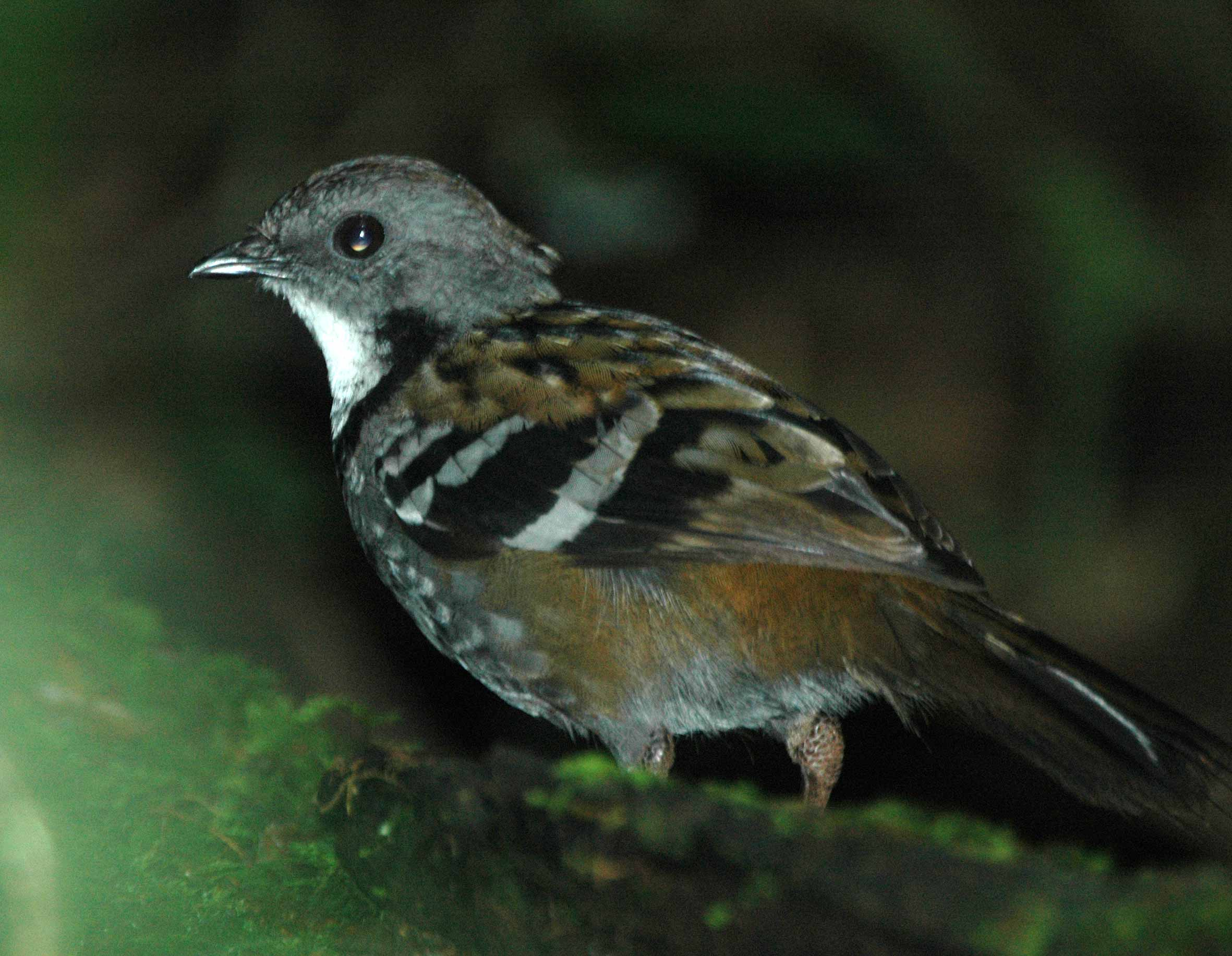
- The park is an important site for Australian logrunners.
- Location: New South Wales
- Nearest city: Glen Innes
- Area: 253 km^{2} (98 sq mi)
- Established: 1 October 1987
- Governing body: NSW National Parks & Wildlife Service

Gibraltar Range is a national park located in northeastern New South Wales, Australia. It is situated 79 kilometres (49 mi) northeast of Glen Innes and 493 kilometres (306 mi) north of Sydney. The Park is part of the Washpool and Gibraltar Range area, which is designated as a World Heritage Site Gondwana Rainforests of Australia. This area was inscribed in 1986 and was later added to the Australian National Heritage List in 2007.

== Birds ==
The Gibraltar Range a national park encompasses an area of 366-square-kilometre (141 sq mi) and is recognised as the Gibraltar Range Important Bird Area (IBA) by BirdLife International because it is a block of highland forest that supports one of only five remaining populations of the vulnerable rufous scrub-bird, as well as significant populations of green catbirds, Australian logrunners, paradise riflebirds and pale-yellow robins.

== See also ==
- Protected areas of New South Wales
- Pappinbarra River
- Camden Haven River
- High Conservation Value Old Growth forest

=== Gallery ===
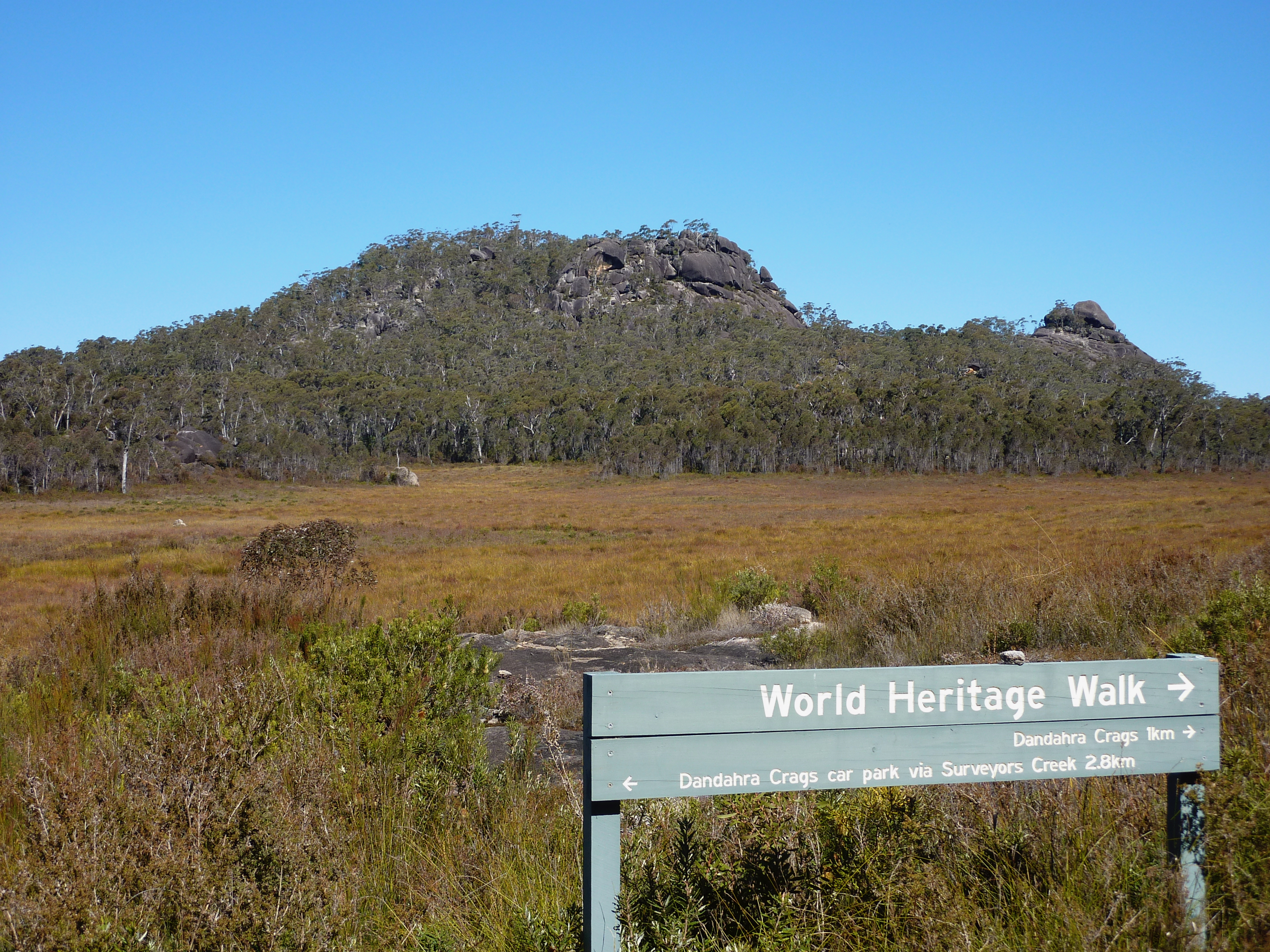
Dandahra Crags

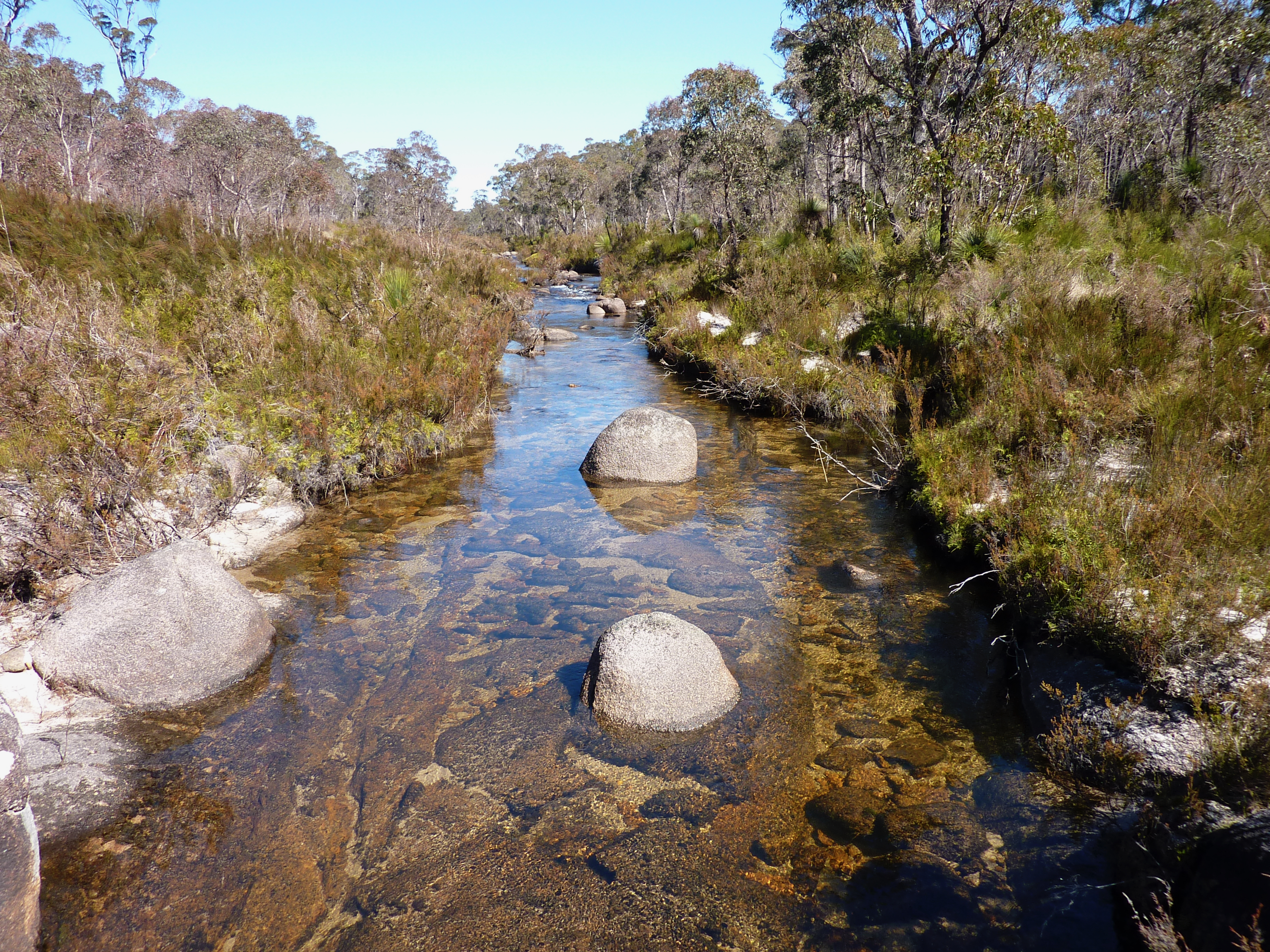
Little Dandahra Creek

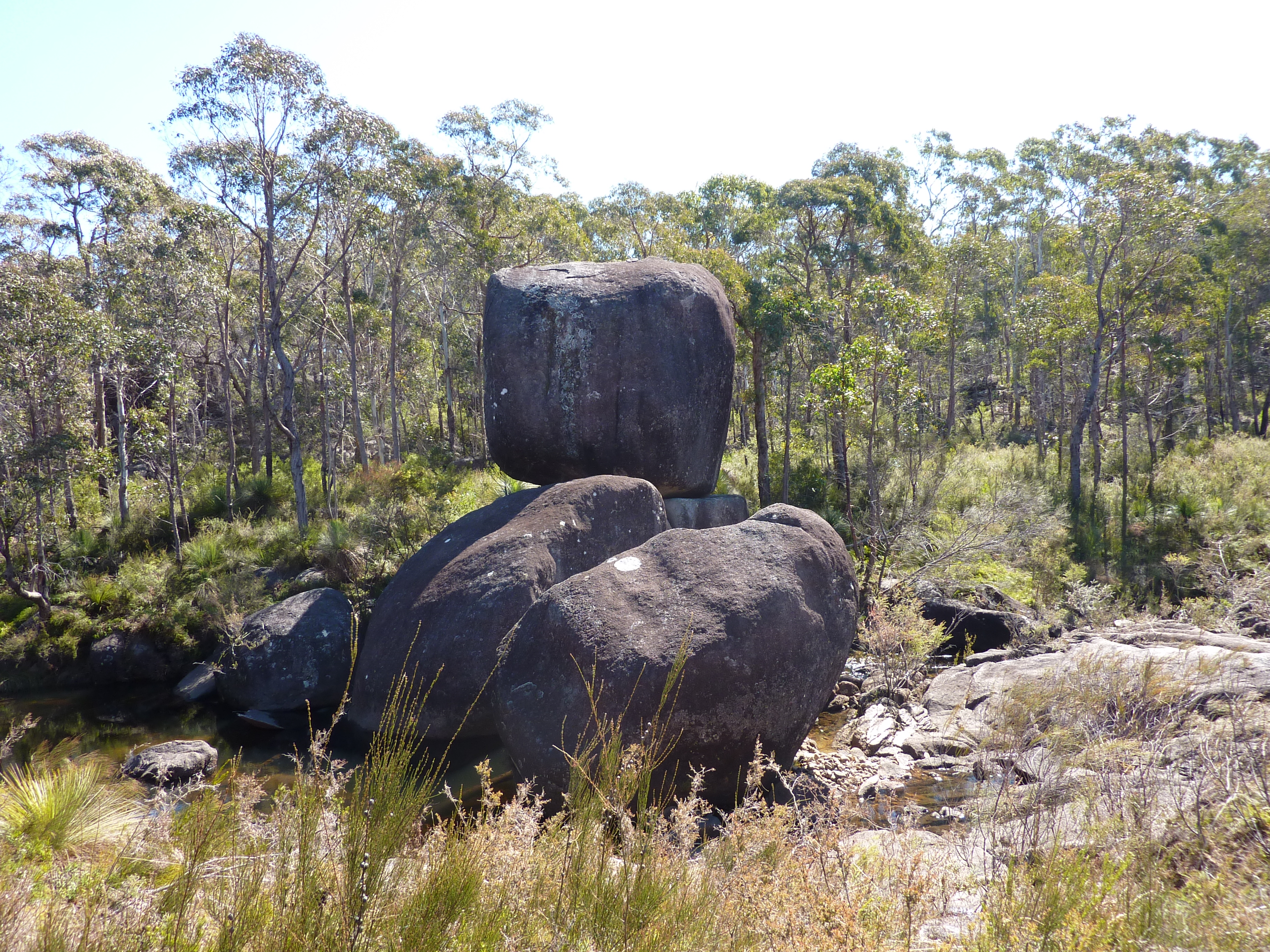
Granite boulders on Surveyors Creek

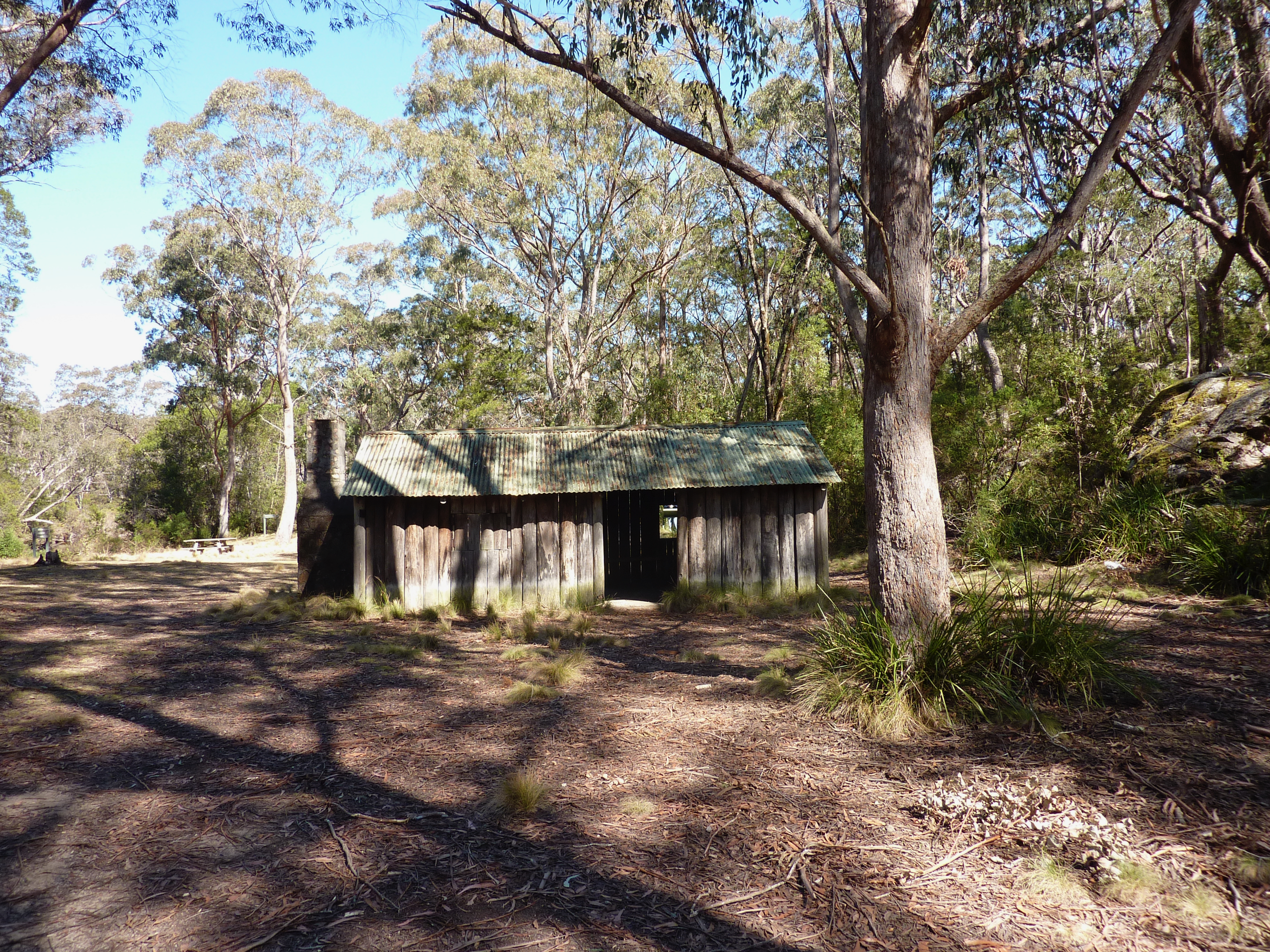
Mulligans Hut

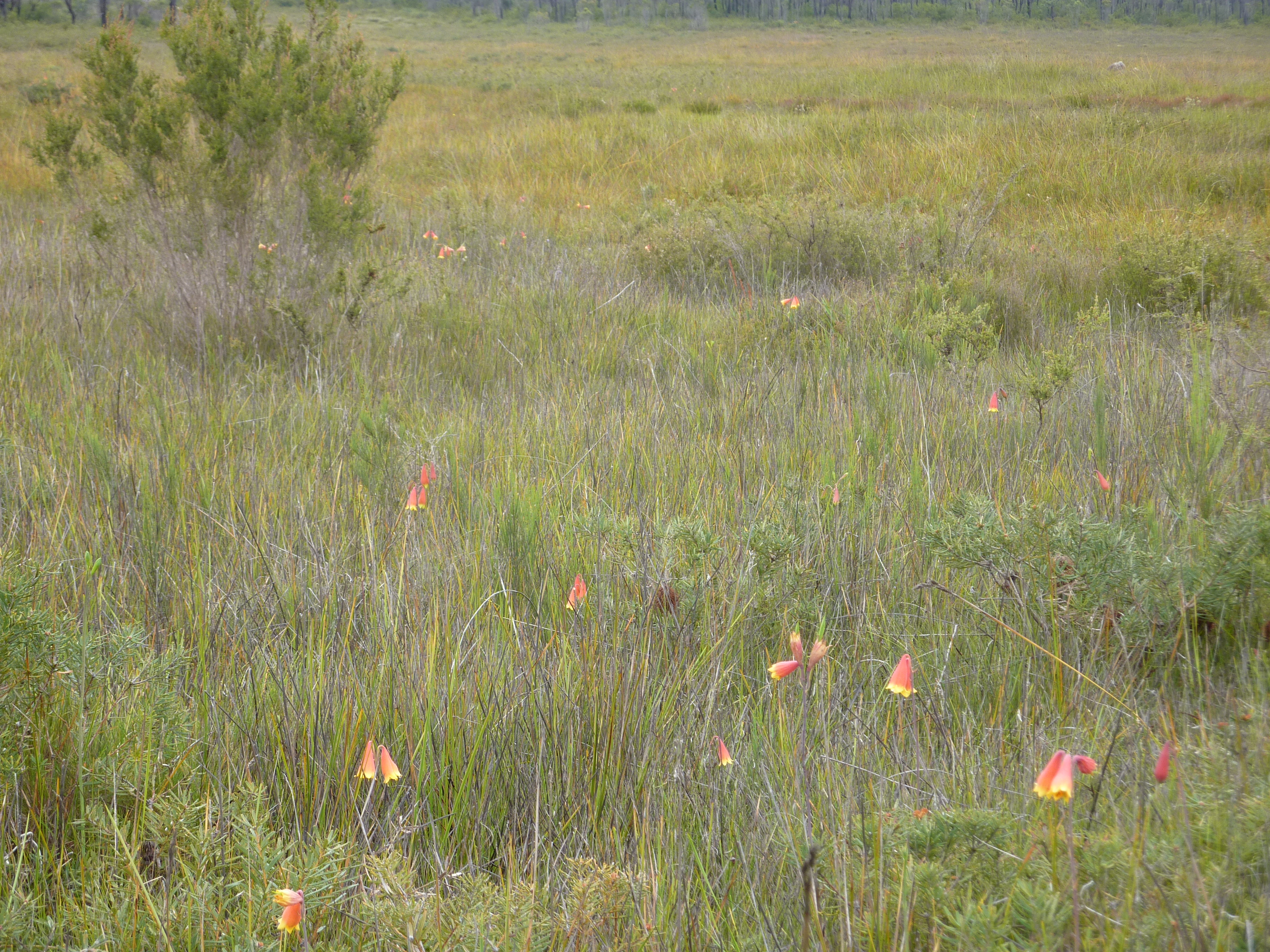
Christmas bells in sedge heath near Surveyors Creek
