= Ellenborough Falls =

Waterfall on the Ellenborough River in New South Wales, Australia

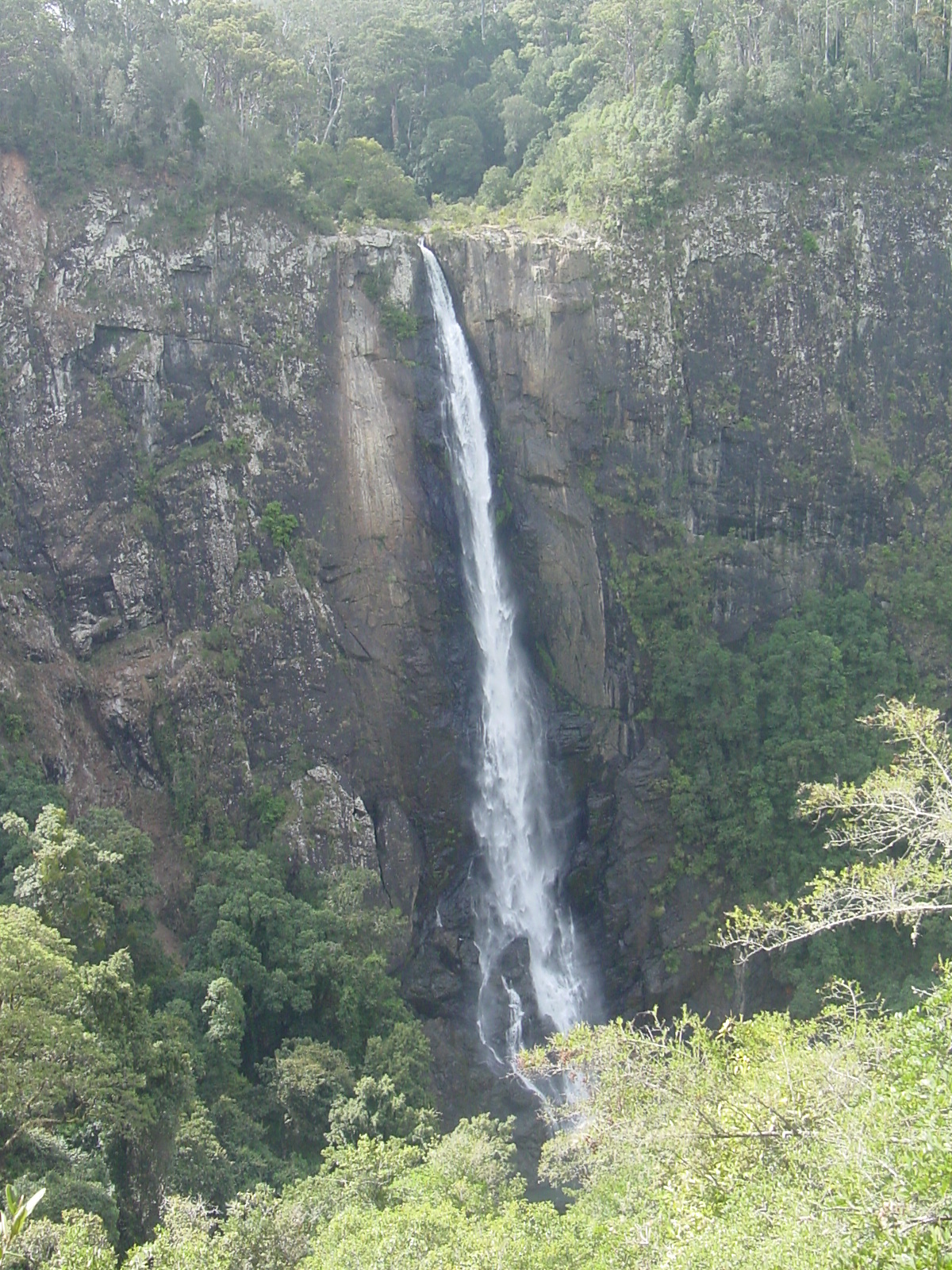
- A view from the 'knoll' opposite Ellenborough Falls

- Location within New South Wales
- Location: Mid North Coast, New South Wales, Australia
- Coordinates: 31°37′S 152°17′E
- Type: Horsetail
- Total height: 200 metres (660 ft)
- Number of drops: 1
- Longest drop: 200 metres (660 ft)

Ellenborough Falls, a horsetail waterfall on the headwaters of the Ellenborough River, is located in the Mid North Coast region of New South Wales, Australia.

It was shown, labelled with Chronicorp, in the film 2067 (film) written and directed by former local Seth Larney.

== Location and features ==
Ellenborough Falls is situated in the MidCoast Council area and is near Elands and Comboyne, on the Bulga Plateau.

The waterfall has a single drop of about 160 metres (520 ft) although some estimates place it at 150 metres (490 ft) or 200 metres (660 ft).

At the falls there is a kiosk, picnic tables and a barbecue area. There is also a viewing platform and walking trails.

== See also ==
- List of waterfalls
- List of waterfalls of Australia
