= Elands, New South Wales =

Elands New South Wales
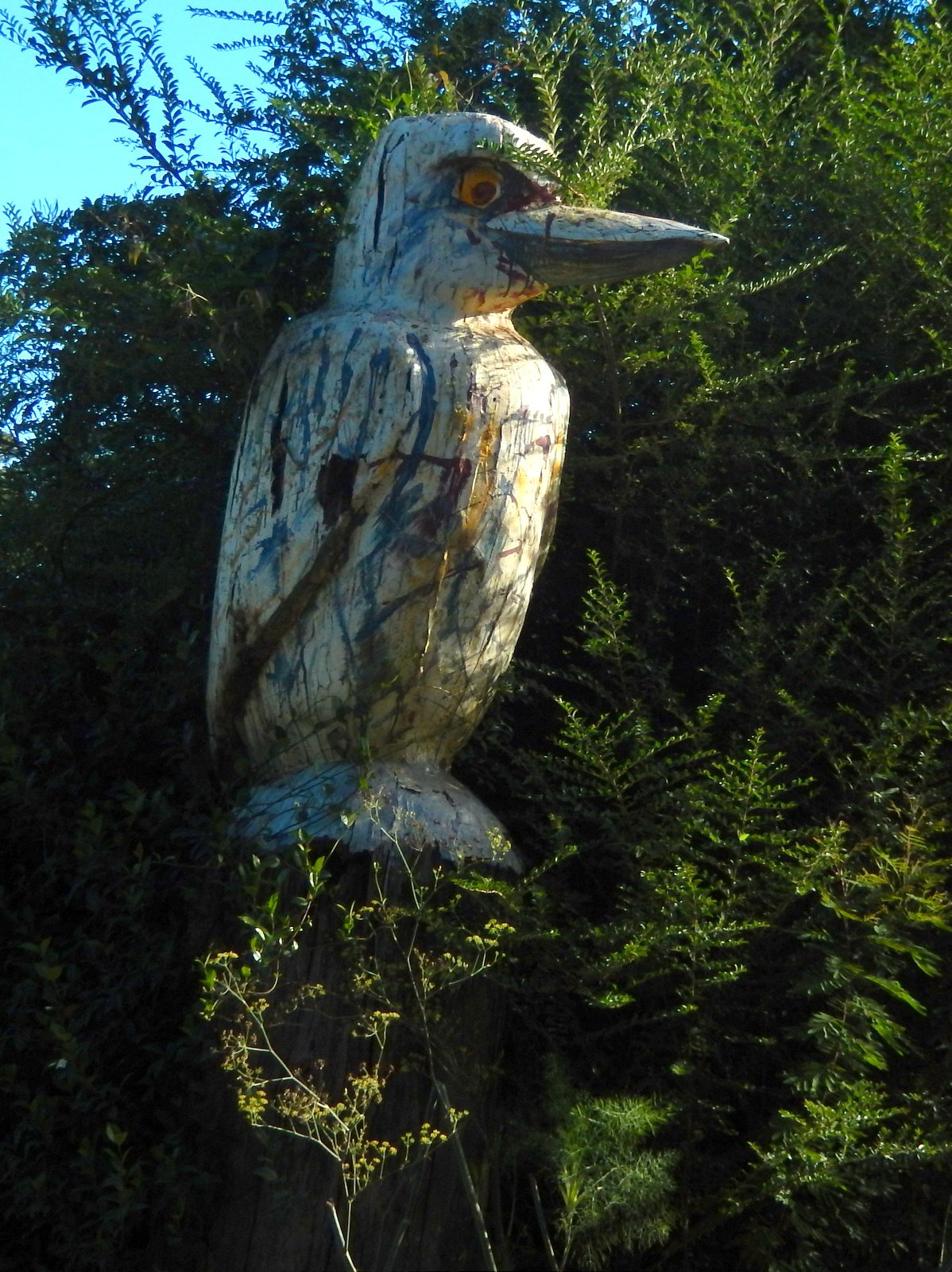
- Kookaburra sculpture on the main street

- Coordinates: 31.62843°S 152.30647°E
- Population: 178 (SAL 2021)
- Postcode(s): 2429
- LGA(s): MidCoast Council
- State electorate(s): Myall Lakes
- Federal division(s): Lyne

Elands is a village on the Mid North Coast region of New South Wales. Ellenborough Falls is accessed via Elands.

Elands is known for its hippie subculture.

== Facilities ==
Elands Public School is the only educational institution in Elands.
