= Werrikimbe National Park =

National park in New South Wales, Australia

- IUCN category Ib (wilderness area)
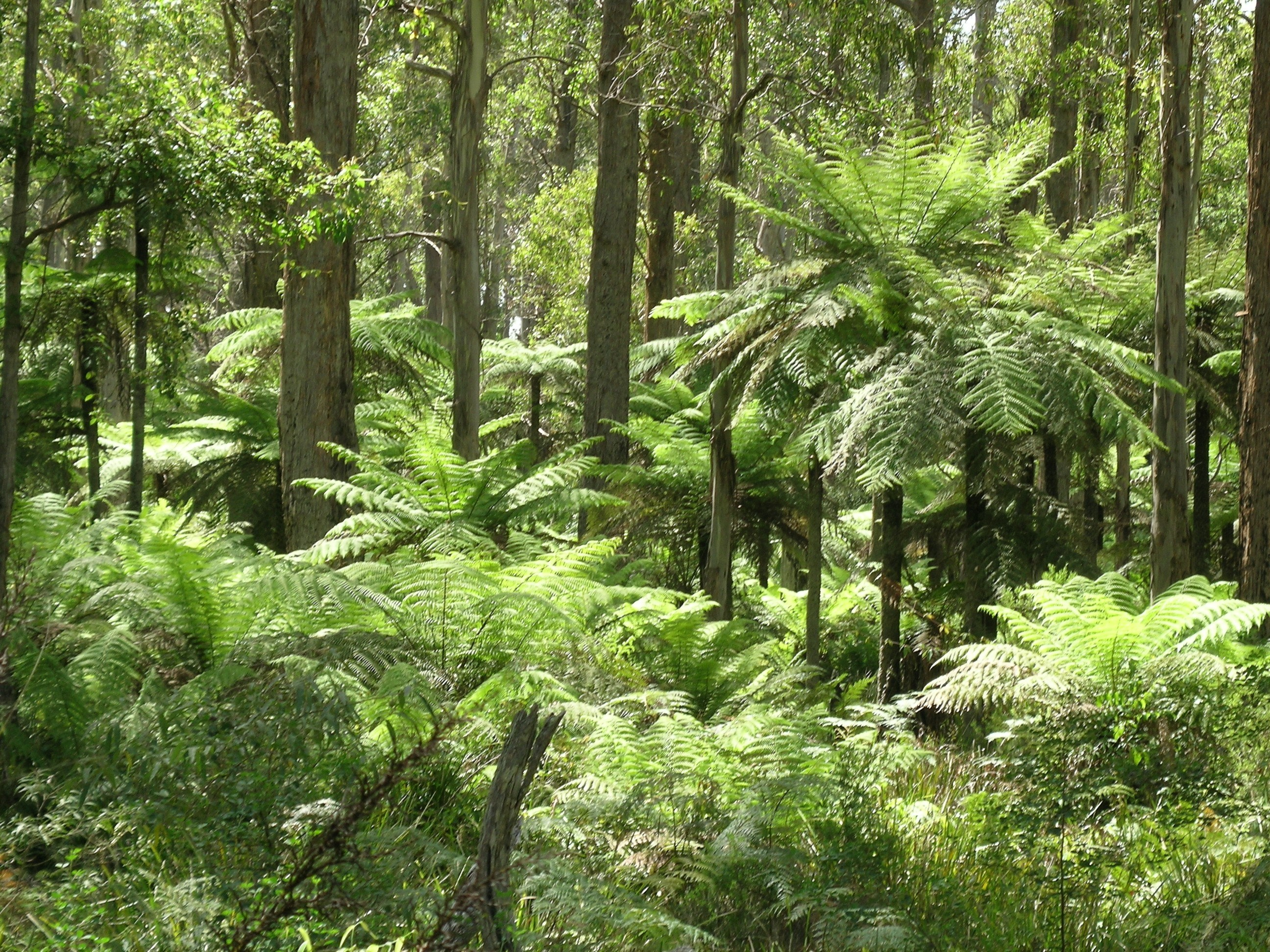
- Tree ferns in Werrikimbe National Park

- Location within New South Wales
- Location: New South Wales
- Nearest city: Walcha
- Coordinates: 31°12′S 152°14′E
- Area: 333 km^{2} (129 sq mi)
- Established: 11 July 1975
- Governing body: NSW National Parks & Wildlife Service
- Website: Official website

The Werrikimbe National Park is a protected national park located in the catchment zone of the Upper Hastings River in New South Wales, Australia. Gazetted in 1975, the 33,309-hectare (82,310-acre) park is situated approximately 486 kilometres (302 mi) north of Sydney, 65 kilometres (40 mi) north-west of Wauchope, and 90 kilometres (56 mi) east of Walcha on the eastern escarpment of the Great Dividing Range.

The park is part of the Hastings-Macleay group World Heritage Site Gondwana Rainforests of Australia inscribed in 1986 and added to the Australian National Heritage List in 2007.

== Description ==
Werrikimbe Park is noted for a rich diversity of plants and animals, rainforest, extensive wilderness, scenic wild rivers and opportunities for outdoor recreation in a remote location. This national park contains an Aboriginal stone arrangement of two stone rings, bora rings, where initiation ceremonies were held.

=== Access and facilities ===
All access roads to the park have a gravel surface, winding and steep in places. These roads are unsuitable for caravans. Beyond the Mooraback Road there is a four-wheel drive (4WD) trail to Youdales Hut visitor area which is only accessible by a 4WD with low range, after obtaining a key for the locked gate from either the National Parks and Wildlife Service or Apsley Motors in Walcha. There are five visitor areas with basic facilities — three on the eastern side near the edge of the escarpment, and two on the west, on the plateau.

Camping sites are available at:

- Brushy Mountain campground (20 sites) on the north-eastern edge of the park. Campsites are suitable for: car and trailer (though not caravan) next to campsite. Facilities: toilets, amenities block, picnic tables, wood barbecues
- Mooraback campground (5 sites) at the north-western end of the park. Facilities: toilets, picnic tables, wood barbecues
- Plateau Beech campground (5 sites), on the eastern side of the park. Campsites are suitable for: people who are happy to walk a short distance from car to tent. Facilities: Pit/composting toilets, amenities block, picnic tables, wood barbecues

The Bicentennial National Trail passes through the western edge of the Werrikimbe Wilderness along the headwaters of the Hastings River and onto the Kunderang Brook. Horses and vehicles are not permitted within the declared Wilderness.

== History ==
The Mooraback area was one of the earliest settlements along the "Falls Country" to the east of Walcha, with records showing the first settlers grazed blocks at Mooraback in the 1850s. The names of some of these settlers are reflected in the names featured in the park: Bishops Swamp, Cleghorns Creek and Careys Trail.

During the 1950s some manganese mining was carried out in what is now within the park confines.

The Hastings River catchment was gazetted as Werrikimbe National Park in 1975, following earlier proposals for its reservation. Its rainforests are now part of the Gondwana Rainforests of Australia World Heritage Area.

== Flora and fauna ==
There is a great variety of vegetation here, depending on rainfall and altitude: eucalypt woodlands, coachwoods, southern sassafras, stinging trees, long-leaf waxflowers and yellow carabeens with their flying buttressed trunks. Werrikimbe is home to the rare plants such as Chiloglottis bird orchids, downy guinea flowers and fairy lanterns. These forests also contain the only examples of filmy king fern known to occur in northern New South Wales. The Antarctic beech forest, found at the end of the North Plateau Road, is estimated to be up to 1,000 years old and forms the largest compact southern beech forest in existence. The threatened parva subspecies of pygmy cypress pine occurs on the eastern edge of the Northern Tablelands in the park.

Werrikimbe is the habitat of at least 22 threatened animal species. The rare Hastings River mouse was considered to be extinct until rediscovered in the park in 1981; it frequents the heathlands and open forest areas near streams. The Australian brushturkey, koala, eastern whipbird, powerful owl, gliders, quolls and lyrebirds may be seen. The park has been identified as an Important Bird Area (IBA) by BirdLife International because it contains one of only five known populations of rufous scrub-birds. It also supports flame and pale-yellow robins, paradise riflebirds, green catbirds, regent bowerbirds and Australian logrunners.

== Gallery ==
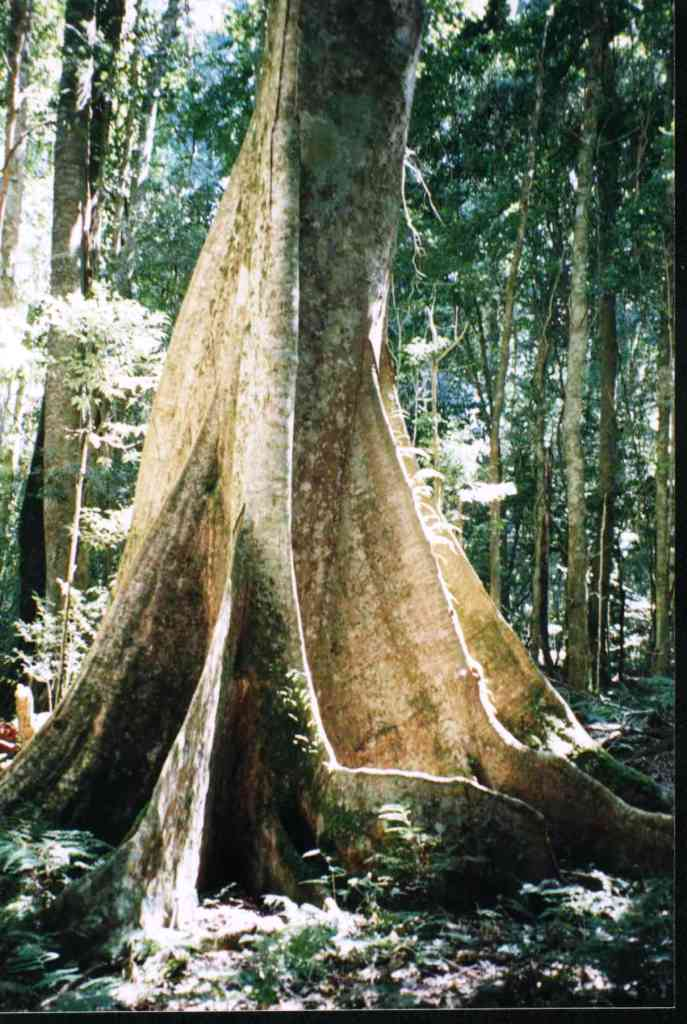
Yellow carabeen, Werrikimbe National Park

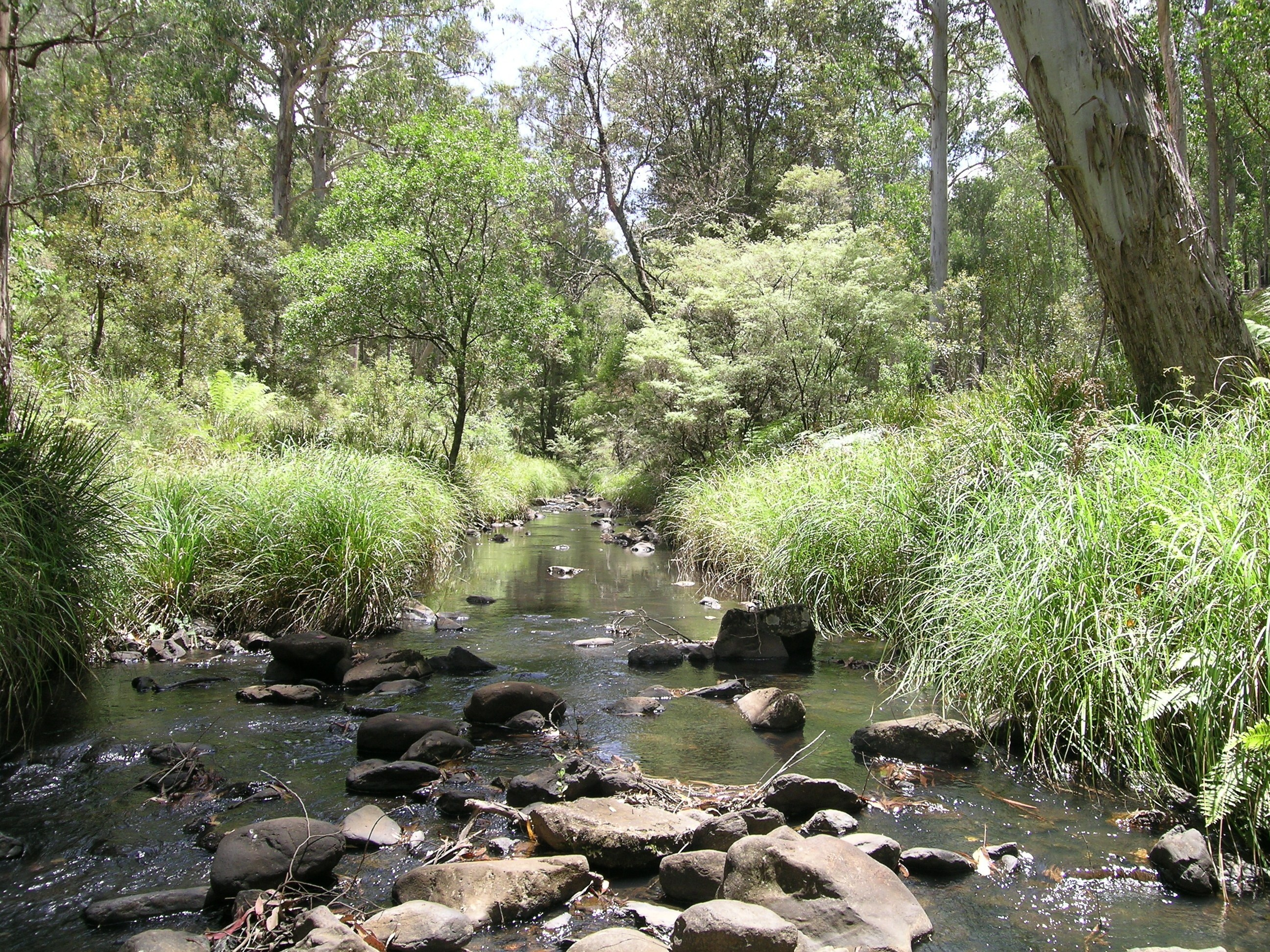
Werrikimbe National Park

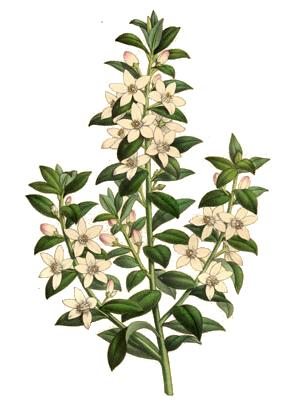
Philotheca myoporoides, found in the national park

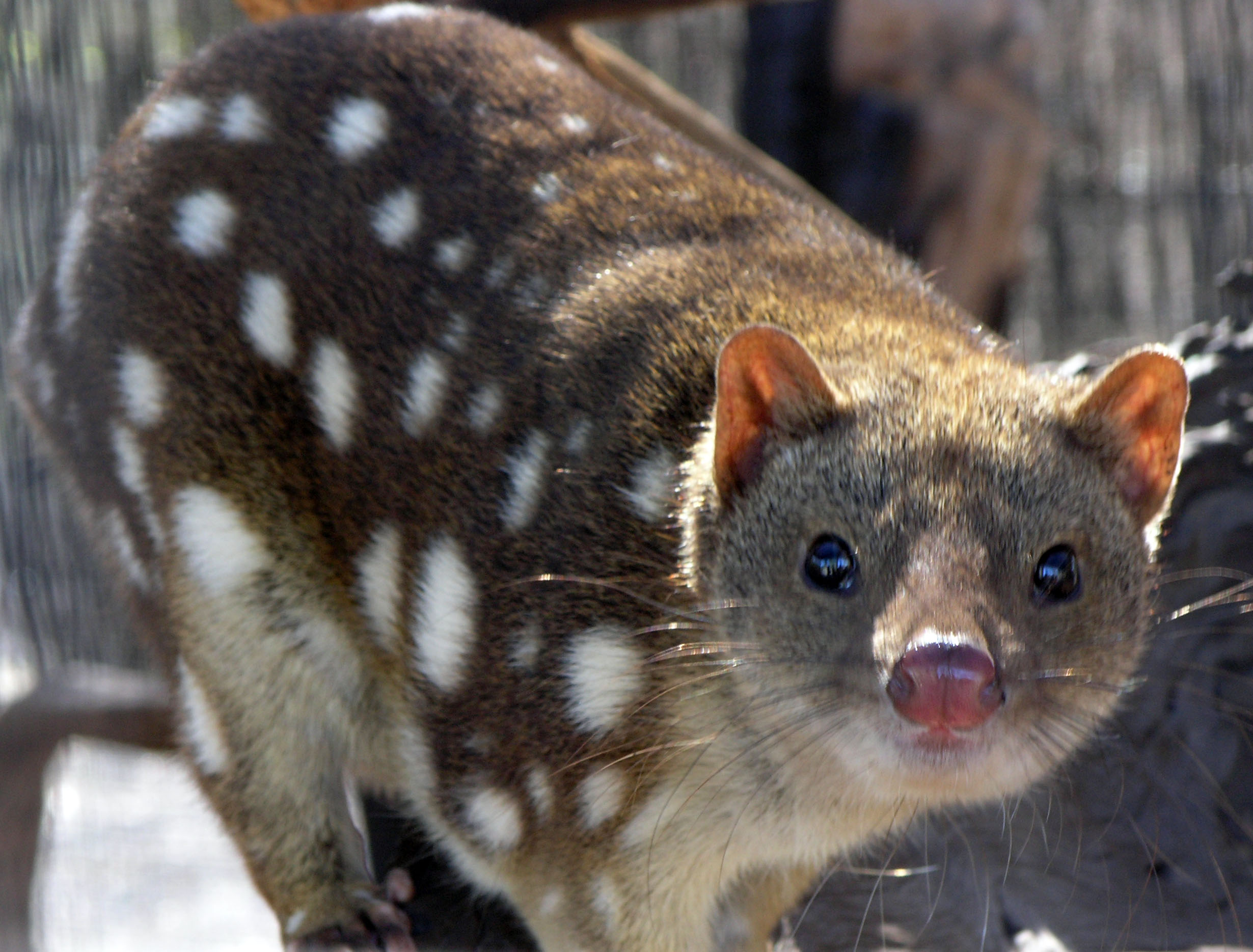
Spotted quoll

== See also ==
- Protected areas of New South Wales
- Northern Warm Temperate Rainforest
