= Major intersections of the Pacific Highway (Australia) =

The major intersections of the Pacific Highway in Australia, spread over 790 kilometres (490 mi) on the eastern seaboard of New South Wales, comprise a mix of freeway grade-separated conditions, suburban and urban roads.

Major intersections, from south to north include junctions with the Warringah Freeway, Lane Cove Tunnel, Gore Hill Freeway, Mona Vale Road / Ryde Road, Cumberland Highway, Pacific Motorway, Motorway Link, Central Coast Highway, Newcastle Inner City Bypass, New England Highway, Oxley Highway, Waterfall Way, Summerland Way, Gwydir Highway, Bruxner Highway, and the Pacific Motorway.

== Major intersections ==
=== North Sydney to Wahroonga interchange, via A1 ===
LGA	Location	km	mi	Destinations	Notes
North Sydney	North Sydney	0	0.0	Bradfield Highway (A1) [south] – Sydney; Cahill Expressway [south] – Sydney	Southern terminus; Bradfield Highway (A1) (no access south to the Bradfield Highway); Road continues south as the Cahill Expressway (with access via Arthur Street)
North Sydney	North Sydney	0	0.0	Warringah Freeway (M1) [north] – Willoughby, Mosman, Chatswood; Bradfield Highway (A1) [north] – Crows Nest, Mosman	Southern terminus; road continues north as the Warringah Freeway (M1)
Willoughby	Lane Cove North	6	3.7	Longueville Road [west] – Lane Cove, Hunters Hill	
Willoughby	Lane Cove North	6	3.7	Lane Cove Tunnel (M2) [west] – Macquarie Park, Baulkham Hills	No eastbound access to the Lane Cove Tunnel (M2)
Willoughby	Lane Cove North	6	3.7	Gore Hill Freeway (M1) [southeast] – Mosman, Sydney Airport	Northern terminus of M1; southbound exit and northbound entrance only
Willoughby	Chatswood	8	5.0	Fullers Road – Chatswood West, Macquarie Park	
Ku-ring-gai	Roseville	9	5.6	Boundary Street – Frenchs Forest, Dee Why	
Ku-ring-gai	Gordon	14	8.7	Mona Vale Road (A3) [north] – Terrey Hills, Mona Vale; Ryde Road (A3) [south] – Macquarie Park, Ryde	Diamond interchange
Hornsby	Wahroonga	19	12	Pacific Motorway (M1) – Sydney	Eastbound entrance and exit only
Hornsby	Wahroonga	19	12	Pennant Hills Road (A28) – Pennant Hills, Parramatta, Liverpool	Southern terminus of B83; Northern terminus of A1; northwestern terminus of A28; Pacific Highway (A1) continues southeast
1.000 mi = 1.609 km; 1.000 km = 0.621 mi: Concurrency terminus; Incomplete access; Tolled; Route transition; Listing includes: Terminuses, declared roads, and intersections where a turn is required to remain on the highway.

=== Wahroonga interchange to Kariong interchange, via B83 ===
LGA	Location	km	mi	Destinations	Notes
Hornsby	Wahroonga	0	0.0	Pacific Motorway (M1) – Sydney	Eastbound entrance and exit only
Hornsby	Wahroonga	0.2	0.12	Pennant Hills Road (A28) – Pennant Hills, Parramatta, Liverpool	Southern terminus of B83; Northern terminus of A1; northwestern terminus of A28; Pacific Highway (A1) continues southeast
Hornsby	Hornsby	3	1.9	Bridge Road to Galston Road – Galston, Berowra Waters	Galston Road not suitable for caravans or large vehicles
Hornsby	Mount Colah	6	3.7	to Ku-ring-gai Chase Road – Bobbin Head to Pacific Motorway (M1) – Sydney, Newcastle	
Hornsby	Berowra	13	8.1	Berowra Waters Road – Berowra Waters, Wisemans Ferry	
Hornsby	Cowan	15	9.3	Pacific Motorway (M1) – Sydney, Newcastle	Southbound exit and northbound entrance only
Hornsby	Brooklyn	25	16	Brooklyn Road – Brooklyn	
Hawkesbury River		26	16	Peats Ferry Bridge	
Central Coast	Mooney Mooney	27	17	Old Pacific Highway to Pacific Motorway (M1) – Sydney, Newcastle	Controlled offset dumbbell interchange
Central Coast	Mount White	37	23	Morgans Road [east] to Pacific Motorway (M1) – Sydney, Newcastle	Four-way intersection
Central Coast	Calga	44	27	Peats Ridge Road – Peats Ridge, Central Mangrove; to Pacific Motorway (M1) – Sydney, Newcastle	
Mooney Mooney Creek		48	30	Old Mooney Mooney Bridge	
Piles Creek		53	33	Holt-Bragg Bridge	
Central Coast	Somersby	54	34	Wisemans Ferry Road – Somersby, Central Mangrove, Wisemans Ferry	Roundabout; (Old) Pacific Highway (B83) continues south
Central Coast	Somersby	54	34	Unnamed service road to Pacific Motorway (M1) – Newcastle	Southbound entrance to M1 and northbound exit from M1 only; Road continues northwest as (Old) Pacific Highway / Wisemans Ferry Road (B83)
Central Coast	Kariong	54.9	34.1	Unnamed service road to Pacific Motorway (M1) – Sydney	Northbound entrance to M1 and southbound exit from M1 only; Road continues northwest as (Old) Pacific Highway / Central Coast Highway (B83)
Central Coast	Kariong	54.9	34.1	Central Coast Highway (A49) – Gosford, The Entrance, Doyalson	Northern terminus of B83; southwestern terminus of A49
1.000 mi = 1.609 km; 1.000 km = 0.621 mi: Concurrency terminus; Incomplete access; Tolled; Route transition; Listing includes: Terminuses, declared roads, and intersections where a turn is required to remain on the highway.

=== Kariong interchange to Hexham, via A49/A43 ===
LGA	Location	km	mi	Destinations	Notes
Central Coast	Kariong	0	0.0	Unnamed service road to Pacific Motorway (M1) – Sydney	Northbound entrance to M1 and southbound exit from M1 only; Road continues northwest as (Old) Pacific Highway / Central Coast Highway (B83)
Central Coast	Gosford	6	3.7	Central Coast Highway (A49) [east] – Terrigal	Trumpet interchange; Eastern concurrency terminus; Pacific Highway / Central Coast Highway (A49) continues west
Central Coast	Ourimbah	19	12	Unnamed service road to Pacific Motorway (M1) – Sydney, Newcastle	Dumbbell interchange
Central Coast	Ourimbah	21	13	Palmdale Road – Palmdale, Kulnura, Bucketty, Wollombi	Roundabout
Central Coast	Tuggerah	26	16	Wyong Road (B74) [east] – Tumbi Umbi, Long Jetty; Wyong Road (B74) [west] to Pacific Motorway (M1) – Sydney, Newcastle	Roundabout
Wyong River		28	17	Bridge over the river (Bridge name unknown)	
Central Coast	Kanwal	37	23	Wallarah Road (B70) [east] – Gorokon, Toukley; Wallarah Road (B70) [west] – Warnervale to Pacific Motorway (M1) – Sydney, Newcastle	Roundabout
Central Coast	Doyalson	43	27	Motorway Link (A43) – Wallarah to Pacific Motorway (M1) – Sydney, Newcastle	Pacific Highway (no shield) continues southeast
Central Coast	Doyalson	63	39	Central Coast Highway / Scenic Drive (A49) [southeast] – Budgewoi, Toukley, The Entrance, Terrigal; Wyee Road [northwest] – Wyee	Four-way intersection
Tuggerah Lake		67	42	Bridge over the lake entrance (Bridge name unknown)	
Newcastle	Belmont	73	45	Macquarie Street (B89) [north} – Croudace Bay, Warners Bay	T-intersection
Newcastle	Windale	79	49	Newcastle Inner City Bypass (A37) [north] – Kotara, North Lambton	Y-intersection
Newcastle	Charlestown	83	52	Charlestown Road (B57) [west] – Lakelands	Y-intersection
Newcastle	Adamstown Heights	85	53	Northcott Drive (B63) [north] – New Lambton	Y-intersection
Newcastle	Newcastle West	90	56	Parry Street to Griffiths Road (A15) [west] – Jesmond, Wallsend, Cameron Park; King Street [east]	Four-way intersection
Newcastle	Newcastle West	90	56	Stewart Avenue [north] – Maryville, Tighes Hill; Hunter Street [east] – Newcastle, Newcastle East	Pacific Highway (A43) continues south
Newcastle	Newcastle West	91	57	Continues east as Hunter Street / Pacific Highway	
Newcastle	Mayfield	96	60	Hanbury Street (B63) [north/south] – Mayfield North, Waratah, New Lambton, Kotara	Four-way intersection
Newcastle	Mayfield West	98	61	Industrial Drive (A43) [east] – Mayfield North, Tighes Hill, Maryville	Y-intersection; Freeway grade-separated conditions eastern terminus; Pacific Highway continues east without a shield
Newcastle	Sandgate	100	62	Newcastle Inner City Bypass (A37) [south] – Callaghan, Jesmond, University of Newcastle	T-intersection
Newcastle	Hexham	105	65	Maitland Road (A1) [west] to Pacific Motorway (south) – Sydney; New England Highway (A43) [west] – Beresfield, Maitland, Branxton	Trumpet interchange; Freeway grade-separated conditions continue; Pacific Highway (A43) continues southeast
Hunter River		106	66	Hexham Bridge	
1.000 mi = 1.609 km; 1.000 km = 0.621 mi: Concurrency terminus; Incomplete access; Tolled; Route transition; Listing includes: Terminuses, declared roads, and intersections where a turn is required to remain on the highway.

=== Hunter River to Bellingen interchange, via A1 ===
LGA	Location	km	mi	Destinations	Notes
Hunter River		0	0.0	Hexham Bridge	
Port Stephens	Tomago	1	0.62	Tomago Road [east] – Williamtown, Nelson Bay, Newcastle Airport	T-intersection; Freeway grade-separated conditions continue
Port Stephens	Heatherbrae	7	4.3	Adelaide Street [northwest] – Raymond Terrace, Nelsons Plains; Masonrite Road [southeast] – Williamtown, Nelson Bay, Newcastle Airport	Roundabout; Freeway grade-separated conditions continue
Port Stephens	Raymond Terrace	11	6.8	Richardson Road [west] – Raymond Terrace, Nelsons Plains; Richardson Road [east] – Williamtown, Nelson Bay, Newcastle Airport	Roundabout interchange; Freeway grade-separated conditions continue
Port Stephens	Raymond Terrace	12	7.5	Adelaide Street	Northbound entrance only; Freeway grade-separated conditions continue
Port Stephens	Twelve Mile Creek	27	17	Bucketts Way [north] – Stroud, Gloucester	T-intersection; Freeway grade-separated conditions continue
Karuah River		37	23	Karuah River Bridge	
Mid-Coast	Karuah	41	25	Tarena Road [south] – Karuah, Tahlee; The Branch Lane – The Branch, Booral	Diamond interchange; Freeway grade-separated conditions continue
Mid-Coast	Tea Gardens	50	31	Myall Way [east] – Tea Gardens, Hawks Nest	T-intersection; Freeway grade-separated conditions continue
Mid-Coast	Bulahdelah	76	47	Booral Road [west] – Booral	Northbound exit only; Freeway grade-separated conditions continue
Mid-Coast	Bulahdelah	78	48	Bulahdelah Way [west] – Bulahdelah, Stroud, Dungog	Trumpet interchange; Freeway grade-separated conditions continue
Myall River		79	49	Myall River Bridge	
Mid-Coast	Bulahdelah	82	51	Bulahdelah Way [west] – Bulahdelah, Stroud, Dungog	Roundabout interchange; Freeway grade-separated conditions continue
Mid-Coast	Bulahdelah	83	52	Wootton Way [north] – Wootton	T-intersection; Freeway grade-separated conditions continue
Mid-Coast	Boolambayte	84	52	The Lakes Way [east] – Smiths Lake, Forster, Tuncurry	T-intersection; Freeway grade-separated conditions continue
Wang Wauk River		116	72	Bridge over the river (bridge name unknown)	
Wallamba River		124	77	Leslie "Mick" Weller Bridge	
Mid-Coast	Nabiac	125	78	Wallanbah Road [west] to Avalon Road/Bucketts Way – Kramback, Gloucester; Nabiac Street [east] – Nabiac	Modified dumbbell and trumpet interchange; Freeway grade-separated conditions continue
Mid-Coast	Possum Brush	130	81	Fallford Road [east] – Darawank, Tuncurry, Forster	T-intersection; Freeway grade-separated conditions continue
Mid-Coast	Rainbow Flat	140	87	The Lakes Way [southeast] – Darawank, Tuncurry, Forster	Trumpet interchange; Freeway grade-separated conditions continue
Mid-Coast	Glenthorne	148	92	Manning River Drive [west] – Taree, Cundletown; Manning River Drive [west] to Bucketts Way – Gloucester; Old Bar Road [east] – Old Bar	Roundabout interchange; Freeway grade-separated conditions continue
South arm of Manning River		153	95	Ella Simon Bridge	
North arm of Manning River		154	96	Henry "Hawkeye" Edwards Bridge	
Mid-Coast	Cundletown	156	97	Princes Street [west] – Cundletown, Taree	Modified single dumbbell interchange; Freeway grade-separated conditions continue
Lansdowne River		166	103	Bridge over the river (bridge name unknown)	
Mid-Coast	Jones Island	167	104	Coopernook Road [east] – Coopernook	T-intersection; Freeway grade-separated conditions continue
Mid-Coast	Moorland	171	106	Jericho Road [east] – Moorland	Northbound exit and southbound entrance only; Freeway grade-separated conditions continue
Mid-Coast	Moorland	174	108	Forest Road [west]; Jericho Road [east] – Moorland	Dumbbell interchange; Freeway grade-separated conditions continue
Mid-Coast	Johns River	180	110	Unnamed service road [west]	Southbound entrance only; Freeway grade-separated conditions continue
Mid-Coast	Johns River	182	113	Stewarts River Road [west] – Johns River, Stewarts River	Northbound entrance and exit only; Freeway grade-separated conditions continue
Mid-Coast	Johns River	183	114	Johns River Road [east] – Johns River	Southbound exit only; Freeway grade-separated conditions continue
Stewarts River		183	114	Bridge over the river (bridge name unknown)	
Camden Haven River		192	119	Bridge over the river (bridge name unknown)	
Port Macquarie-Hastings	Kew	194	121	Nancy Bird Walton Drive [west]	Northbound exit only; Freeway grade-separated conditions continue
Port Macquarie-Hastings	Kew	195	121	Ocean Drive [east/west] – Laurieton, North Haven, Bonny Hills, Kendall	Southbound exit and entrance only; Freeway grade-separated conditions continue
Port Macquarie-Hastings	Kew	196	122	Nancy Bird Walton Drive [west]	Northbound entrance only; Freeway grade-separated conditions continue
Port Macquarie-Hastings	Lake Innes	210	130	Houston Mitchell Drive – Lake Cathie, Bonny Hills	T-intersection; Freeway grade-separated conditions continue
Port Macquarie-Hastings	Thrumster	218	135	Oxley Highway (B56) [west] – Wauchope, Walcha, Tamworth, Gunnedah, Coonabarabran; Oxley Highway (B56) [east] – Port Macquarie	Roundabout interchange; Freeway grade-separated conditions continue Southern terminus of the M1.
Hastings River		223	139	Bridge over the river (bridge name unknown)	
Port Macquarie-Hastings	Blackmans Point	226	140	Telegraph Point Road [west] – Telegraph Point, Pembrooke; Hasting River Drive [southeast] – Port Macquarie; Blackmans Point Road [east] – Blackmans Point	Roundabout interchange; Freeway grade-separated conditions continue
Wilson River		234	145	Bridge over the river (bridge name unknown)	
Port Macquarie-Hastings	Cooperabung	235	146	Telegraph Point Road [west] – Telegraph Point, Pembrooke	Northbound entrance only; Freeway grade-separated conditions continue
Port Macquarie-Hastings	Cooperabung	235	146	Unnamed service road [east] to Haydeons Wharf Road	Southbound exit only; Freeway grade-separated conditions continue
Kempsey	South Kempsey	256	159	Macleay Valley Way [west] – Kempsey	Dumbbell interchange; Freeway grade-separated conditions continue
Kempsey	South Kempsey	257	160	Macleay Valley Way [west]	Northbound entrance only; Freeway grade-separated conditions continue
Macleay River		269	167	Macleay River Bridge	
Kempsey	Bellimbopinni	270	170	Macleay Valley Way [west] – Frederickton, Kempsey; Macleay Valley Way [east] – Bellimbopinni	Dumbbell interchange; Freeway grade-separated conditions continue
Nambucca	Eungai Creek	294	183	Blackbutt Shute Road [west]; Macleay Valley Way [southeast] – Clybucca, Rainbow Beach, Jerseyville; Stuarts Point Road [northeast] – Stuarts Point	Dumbbell interchange; Freeway grade-separated conditions continue
Nambucca	Congarinni	304	189	Giinagay Way [west] – Macksville	Northbound exit and southbound exit and entrance; Freeway grade-separated conditions continue
Nambucca	Macksville	311	193	Giinagay Way [west] – Macksville; Bald Hill Road [east]	Dumbbell interchange; Freeway grade-separated conditions continue
Nambucca River		314	195	Phillip Hughes Bridge	
Nambucca	North Macksville	315	196	Old Coast Road [east] – to Giinagay Way – Macksville, Nambucca Heads	Southbound exit only; Freeway grade-separated conditions continue
Nambucca	North Macksville	316	196	Old Coast Road [east] – from Giinagay Way – Macksville, Nambucca Heads	Northbound entrance only; Freeway grade-separated conditions continue
Bellingen	Valla	324	201	to Giinagay Way [east] – Nambucca Heads; Unnamed service road [west]	Dumbbell interchange; Freeway grade-separated conditions continue
Bellingen	Valla	334	208	Ballards Road [east/west] to Giinagay Way [east] – Urunga, Nambucca Heads	Diamond interchange; Freeway grade-separated conditions continue
Kalang River		339	211	Bridge over the river (bridge name unknown)	
Bellingen	Raleigh	345	214	Waterfall Way [west] – Dorrigo, Ebor, Armidale; Giinagay Way [east] – Urunga	Offset three-way dumbbell interchange spread north/south over 700 metres (2,300 ft); Freeway grade-separated conditions continue Northern terminus of the M1.
Bellinger River		346	215	Bridge over the river (bridge name unknown)	
Bellingen	Valery	350	220	Mailmans Track Road [west]; Pine Creek Way [northeast] – Bonville; Keevers Drive [southeast] – Repton	Dumbbell interchange; Freeway grade-separated conditions continue
1.000 mi = 1.609 km; 1.000 km = 0.621 mi: Concurrency terminus; Incomplete access; Tolled; Route transition; Listing includes: Terminuses, declared roads, and intersections where a turn is required to remain on the highway.

=== Bellingen interchange to Ballina interchange, via A1 ===
LGA	Location	km	mi	Destinations	Notes
Bellingen	Valery	0	0.0	Mailmans Track Road [west]; Pine Creek Way [northeast] – Bonville; Keevers Drive [southeast] – Repton	Dumbbell interchange; Freeway grade-separated conditions continue
Coffs Harbour	Bonville	4	2.5	Archville Station Road [east/west] – Bonville	Roundabout interchange; Freeway grade-separated conditions continue
Coffs Harbour	Bonville	9	5.6	Pine Creek Road [west] – Bonville; Lyons Road [east] – Sawtell	Roundabout interchange; Freeway grade-separated conditions continue
Coffs Harbour	Boambee	12	7.5	Lindsays Road [west] – Boambee; Sawtell Road [east] – Sawtell	Diamond interchange; Freeway grade-separated conditions continue
Coffs Harbour	Coffs Harbour	14	8.7	Englands Road [west]; Stadium Drive [east] – Coffs Harbour International Stadium, Southern Cross University	Roundabout; Freeway grade-separated conditions continue
Coffs Harbour	Coffs Harbour	14	8.7	Isles Drive – Coffs Harbour Base Hospital	Freeway grade-separated conditions continue
Coffs Harbour	Coffs Harbour	15	9.3	Cook Drive [east/west]	Diamond interchange; Freeway grade-separated conditions continue
Coffs Harbour	Coffs Harbour	20	12	Bray Street [west]; Orlando Street [east]	Diamond interchange; Freeway grade-separated conditions continue
Coffs Harbour	Coffs Harbour	20	12	Mastracolas Road [west] – Coffs Harbour; Arthur Street [east]	Roundabout interchange; Freeway grade-separated conditions northern terminus
Coffs Harbour	Coffs Harbour	21	13	Diggers Beach Road [east]; Big Banana [west]	Tourist attraction and amusement park; Freeway grade-separated conditions southern terminus
Coffs Harbour	Sapphire Beach	26	16	Solitary Islands Way [east] – Sapphire Beach	Northbound exit and southbound entrance only; Freeway grade-separated conditions continue
Coffs Harbour	Sapphire Beach	33	21	Solitary Islands Way [east] – Sapphire Beach; Gaudrons Road [west] – Sapphire Beach	Dumbbell interchange; Freeway grade-separated conditions continue
Coffs Harbour	Moonee Beach	35	22	Solitary Islands Way [west] to Old Bucca Road – Bucca; Moonee Beach Road [east] – Moonee Beach	Dumbbell interchange; Freeway grade-separated conditions continue
Coffs Harbour	Moonee Beach	38	24	Solitary Islands Way [west] to Bucca Road – Bucca; Service Road [east] to Tiki Road	Dumbbell interchange; Freeway grade-separated conditions continue
Coffs Harbour	Emerald Beach	41	25	Service Road [east] to Fiddaman Road – Emerald Beach	Trumpet interchange; Southbound entrance and northbound entrance only; Freeway grade-separated conditions continue
Coffs Harbour	Sandy Beach	42	26	Solitary Islands Way [west] – Sandy Beach, Woolgoolga	Off-set dumbbell interchange; Freeway grade-separated conditions continue
Coffs Harbour	Woolgoolga	40	25	Solitary Islands Way [east] – Woolgoolga, Mullaway, Safety Beach; Solitary Islands Way [west] – Sandy Beach	Offset three-way dumbbell interchange spread north/south over one kilometre (one mile); Freeway grade-separated conditions continue
Coffs Harbour	Arrawarra	50	31	Solitary Islands Way [southeast] – Mullaway, Safety Beach; Eggins Drive [northeast] – Arrawarra; Unnamed service road [west]	Dumbbell interchange; Freeway grade-separated conditions continue
Clarence Valley	Dirty Creek	60	37	Range Road [west]; Range Road East [east] to Old Pacific Highway – Dirty Creek	Diamond interchange; Freeway grade-separated conditions continue
Clarence Valley	Halfway Creek	71	44	Kungala Road west – Kungala	T-intersection; Freeway grade-separated conditions continue
Clarence Valley	Glenugie	85	53	Big River Way [west] to – South Grafton, Grafton; to Gwydir Highway (B76) [west] – Glen Innes, Moree, Walgett; to Summerland Way (B91) [north] – Casino	Northbound exit and southbound entrance only; Freeway grade-separated conditions continue
Clarence Valley	Glenugie	86	53	Unnamed service road [west] from Eight Mile Lane – South Grafton, Grafton; Unnamed service road [east] to Eight Mile Lane – South Grafton, Grafton, Sandy Crossing	Northbound entrance and southbound exit only; Freeway grade-separated conditions continue
Clarence Valley	Tyndale	118	73	Big River Way [west] – Grafton; Big River Way [east]	Northbound exit and southbound entrance only; Freeway grade-separated conditions continue
Clarence Valley	Tyndale	120	75	Old Pacific Highway [west] – Maclean; Big River Way [east] – Grafton	Northbound entrance and southbound exit only; Freeway grade-separated conditions continue
Clarence Valley	Maclean	131	81	Cameron Street [west] – Maclean	T-intersection; Freeway grade-separated conditions continue
Clarence Valley	Maclean	131	81	Goodwood Street [west] – Maclean; Goodwood Street [east] – Maclean	Offset dumbbell interchange; Freeway grade-separated conditions continue
Clarence Valley	Maclean	136	85	Unnamed service road to Yamba Road [west] – Yamba, Old Harwood Bridge; Unnamed service road to Yamba Road [east] – Maclean, Old Harwood Bridge	Offset incomplete southbound entrance and exit; Offset incomplete northbound entrance and exit; Freeway grade-separated conditions continue
Clarence River		137	85	New Harwood Bridge	
Clarence Valley	Harwood	139	86	Unnamed service road [west] – Harwood	Northbound entrance only; Freeway grade-separated conditions continue
North Arm		145	90	Mororo Bridge	
Clarence Valley	Woombah	147	91	Iluka Road [east] – Iluka	Diamond interchange, replaces a T-intersection
Clarence Valley	Jacky Bulbin Flat	150	93	Pacific Highway (A1)	Freeway grade-separated conditions southern terminus
Richmond Valley	Tabbimoble	156	97	Pacific Highway (A1)	Freeway grade-separated conditions northern terminus
Richmond Valley	Woodburn	183	114	Wyrallah Road [northwest] – Lismore	T-intersection
Richmond Valley	Woodburn	183	114	Alfred Street to Woodburn–Evans Heads Road [east] – Evans Head	T-intersection
Richmond River		203	126	Wardell Bridge	
Ballina	Wardell	205	127	Pacific Highway (A1)	Freeway grade-separated conditions southern terminus
Ballina	Uralba	213	132	Bruxner Highway (B60) [west] – Lismore, Casino, Tenterfield, Goondiwindi	Northbound exit only; Freeway grade-separated conditions continue
Ballina	Ballina	216	134	Bruxner Highway (B60) [west] – Lismore, Casino, Tenterfield, Goondiwindi; River Street [east] – Ballina	Roundabout interchange; Northern terminus of A1; Southern terminus of M1; Freeway grade-separated conditions continue
1.000 mi = 1.609 km; 1.000 km = 0.621 mi: Concurrency terminus; Incomplete access; Tolled; Route transition; Listing includes: Terminuses, declared roads, and intersections where a turn is required to remain on the highway.

=== Ballina interchange to Brunswick Heads interchange, via M1 ===
LGA	Location	km	mi	Destinations	Notes
Ballina	Ballina	0	0.0	Bruxner Highway (B60) [west] – Lismore, Casino, Tenterfield, Goondiwindi; River Street [east] – Ballina	Roundabout interchange; Northern terminus of A1; Southern terminus of M1; Freeway grade-separated conditions continue
Ballina	Cumbalum	5	3.1	Tamarind Drive [northwest/southeast] – Titenbar, Ballina	Offset incomplete northbound entrance; Offset incomplete southbound exit; Freeway grade-separated conditions continue
Ballina	Tintenbar	9	5.6	Tamarind Drive [west] – Tintenbar; Hinterland Drive/Ross Lane [east] – Lennox Head	Offset dumbbell interchange northbound exit and entrance; Incomplete dumbbell southbound entrance only; Freeway grade-separated conditions continue
Ballina	Knockrow	11	6.8	Unnamed service road [east] to Hinterland Way [south/north] – Titenbar, Newrybar	Southbound exit only; Freeway grade-separated conditions continue
Byron	Bangalow	20	12	Bangalow Road (B62) [northwest/southeast} – Bangalow, Byron Bay	Northbound exit and southbound entrance only; Freeway grade-separated conditions continue
St Helena Road (no access)		24	15	St Helena Tunnel	
Byron	Ewingsdale	26	16	Ewingsdale Road [east] – Byron Bay; Myocum Road [west] – Myocum; Bangalow Road (B62) [southwest] – Bangalow	Dumbbell interchange; Freeway grade-separated conditions continue
Byron	Tyagarah	32	20	Gulgan Road [west] – Mullumbimby; Unnamed service road [east] to Yarun Road [south] – Tyagarah	Modified offset diamond interchange; Freeway grade-separated conditions continue
Byron	Brunswick Heads	35	22	Gulgan Road [west] – Mullumbimby; Old Pacific Highway [east] – Brunswick Heads	Dumbbell interchange; Freeway grade-separated conditions continue
Byron	Brunswick Heads	35	22	Pacific Motorway (M1) [north] – Brunswick Heads, Gold Coast, Brisbane	Dumbbell interchange; Freeway grade-separated conditions continue as Pacific Motorway (M1) [north]
1.000 mi = 1.609 km; 1.000 km = 0.621 mi: Concurrency terminus; Incomplete access; Tolled; Route transition; Listing includes: Terminuses, declared roads, and intersections where a turn is required to remain on the highway.
