= Long Flat, New South Wales =

Long Flat New South Wales
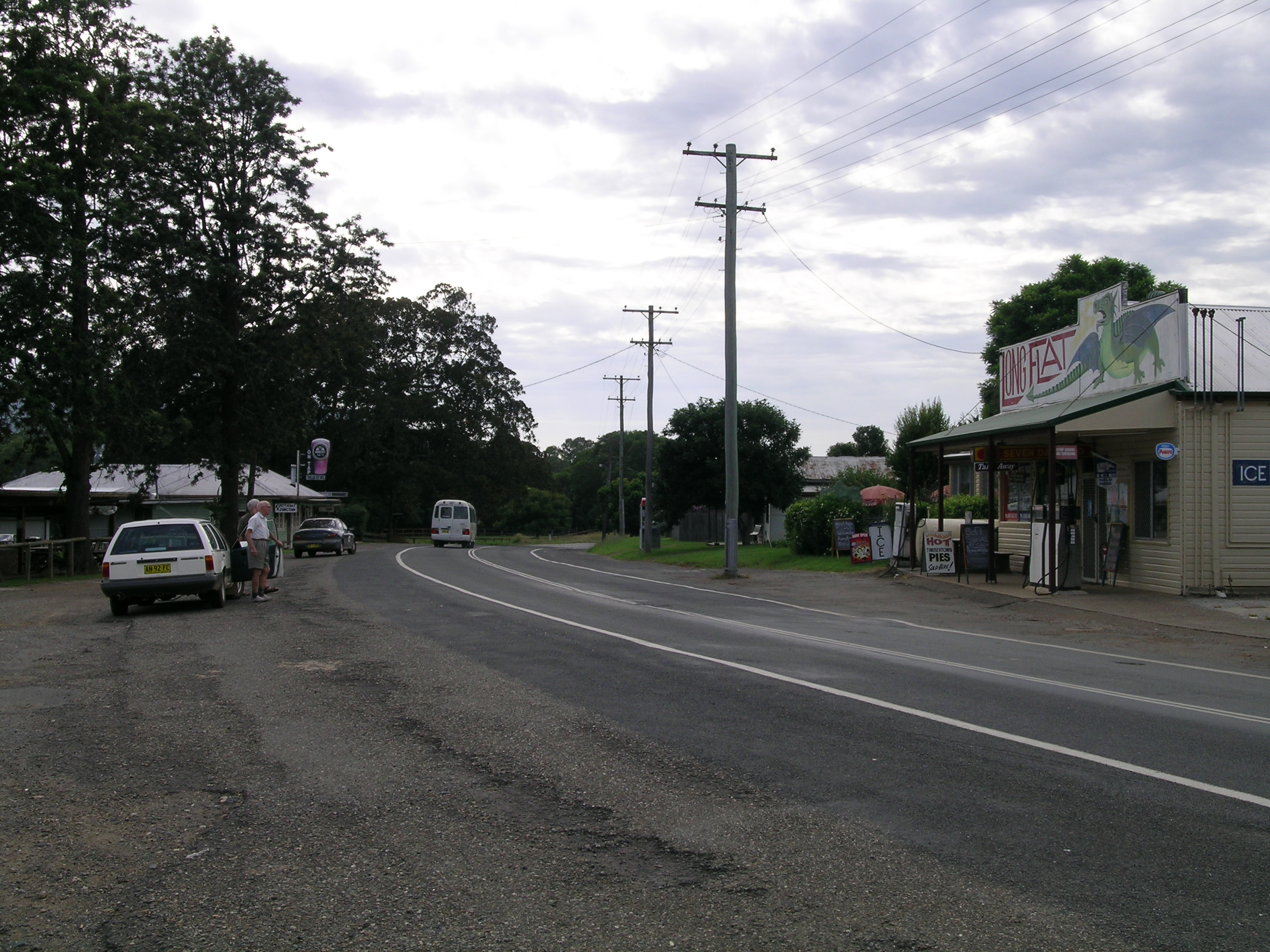
- Hotel and general store in Long Flat

- Coordinates: 31°26′S 152°29′E
- Population: 112 (SAL 2021)
- Postcode(s): 2446
- Elevation: 60 m (197 ft)
- Location: 30 km (19 mi) W of Wauchope; 133 km (83 mi) ESE of Walcha; 48 km (30 mi) W of Port Macquarie; 409 km (254 mi) NNE of Sydney
- LGA(s): Port Macquarie-Hastings Council
- County: Macquarie
- Parish: Cowangara
- State electorate(s): Oxley
- Federal division(s): Lyne
Localities around Long Flat:
Kindee	Pappinbarra	Hollisdale
Yarras	Long Flat	Bagnoo
Ellenborough	Comboyne	Byabarra

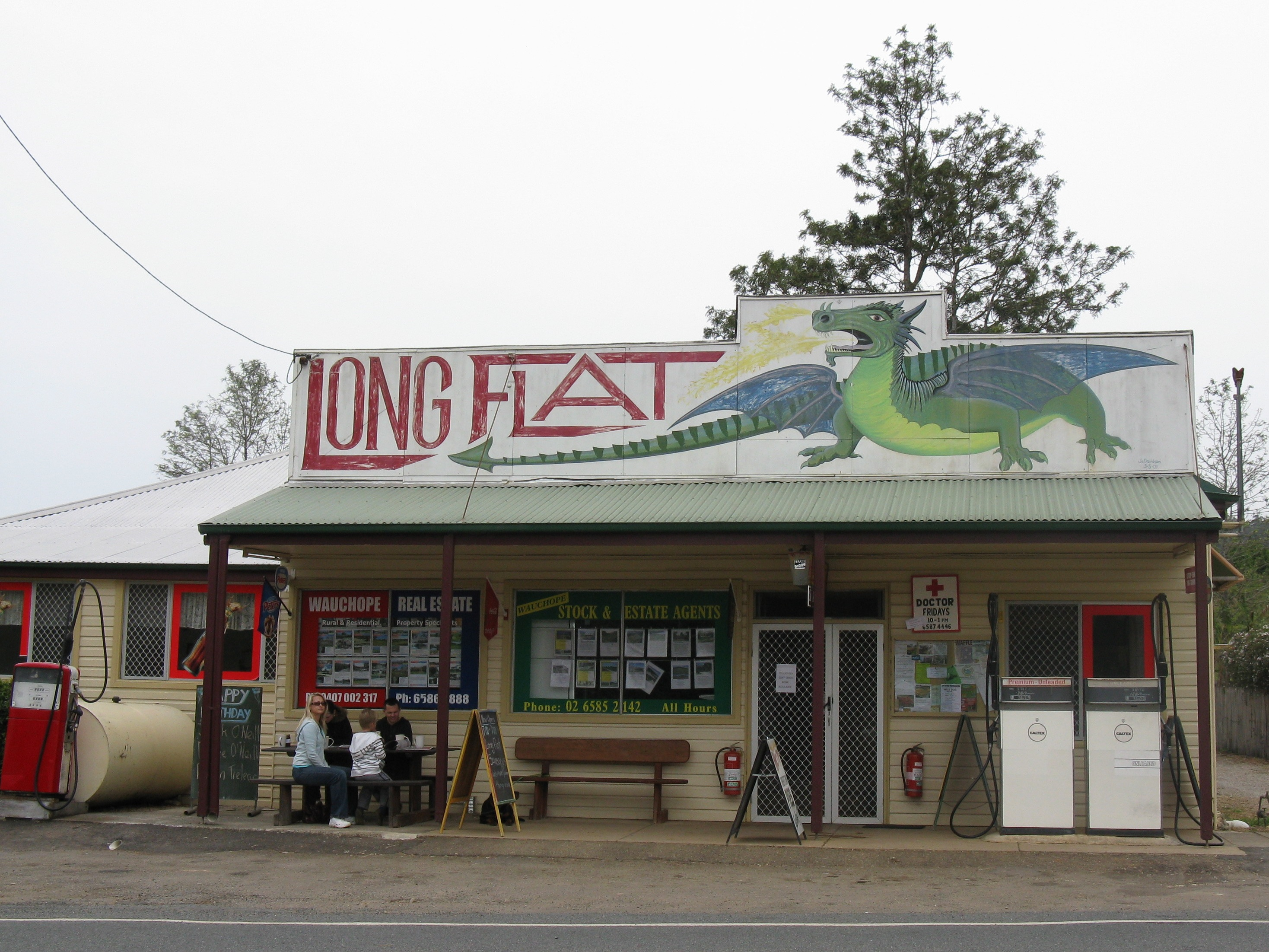
Long Flat General Store

Long Flat is a rural village situated on the Oxley Highway and the southern bank of the Hastings River. This village is about 50 kilometres west of Port Macquarie, 30 kilometres west of Wauchope and 133 km east of Walcha. The boundaries are within the Port Macquarie-Hastings Council Local Government Area and Macquarie County.

== Village ==
The Long Flat village has a class four primary school, hotel, community hall, recreation ground, tennis court and general store. Long Flat Public School has 36 students enrolled for classes Kindergarten to Year 6 in 2013. The 2011 census did not record Long Flat's population, however it shows that the population of the district including the localities of Kindee, Toms Creek, Ellenborough and Birdwood was 294. The Electoral district of Oxley records show that 296 people voted there in 2007. Long Flat voting in the Division of Lyne recorded 286 voters who placed their votes in the village in 2007.

== Flora and fauna ==
Native animals that may be seen in the region include echidnas, goannas, kangaroos, platypus, wallabies, yabbies and crayfish, turtles and possums. There are fish in the river. The area has a diverse range of birds including bowerbirds, king parrots, kingfishers, honeyeaters and wedge-tailed eagles.

Big Nellie Hakea (Hakea archaeoides) and Tree Guinea Flower (Hibbertia hexandra) are threatened flora species that grow in the region.

== Industry ==
This is mostly an agricultural region with dairy farming and beef cattle breeding the main industries.

== Grant ==
In February 2009 it was announced that the Long Flat Tennis Club would receive a government grant of A$25,000 for resurfacing and refurbishments to the courts which were in a poor state. The upgrade work was subsequently done and the club now has a thriving competition held on Tuesday and Thursday evenings during the summer months.

== Events ==
Seafood Day: This event is always held on the first Saturday in December and has been held for over 25 years. It is a major fund raiser for the local Rugby League team, The Long Flat Dragons, and attracts people from Port Macquarie, Wauchope and surrounding areas.

Campdraft: Held in September each year at the Long Flat Showground, this is one of the largest Campdrafts in NSW.

== See also ==
- Ellenborough, New South Wales
- Long Flat travel guide from Wikivoyage
