= Ellenborough, New South Wales =

Ellenborough New South Wales
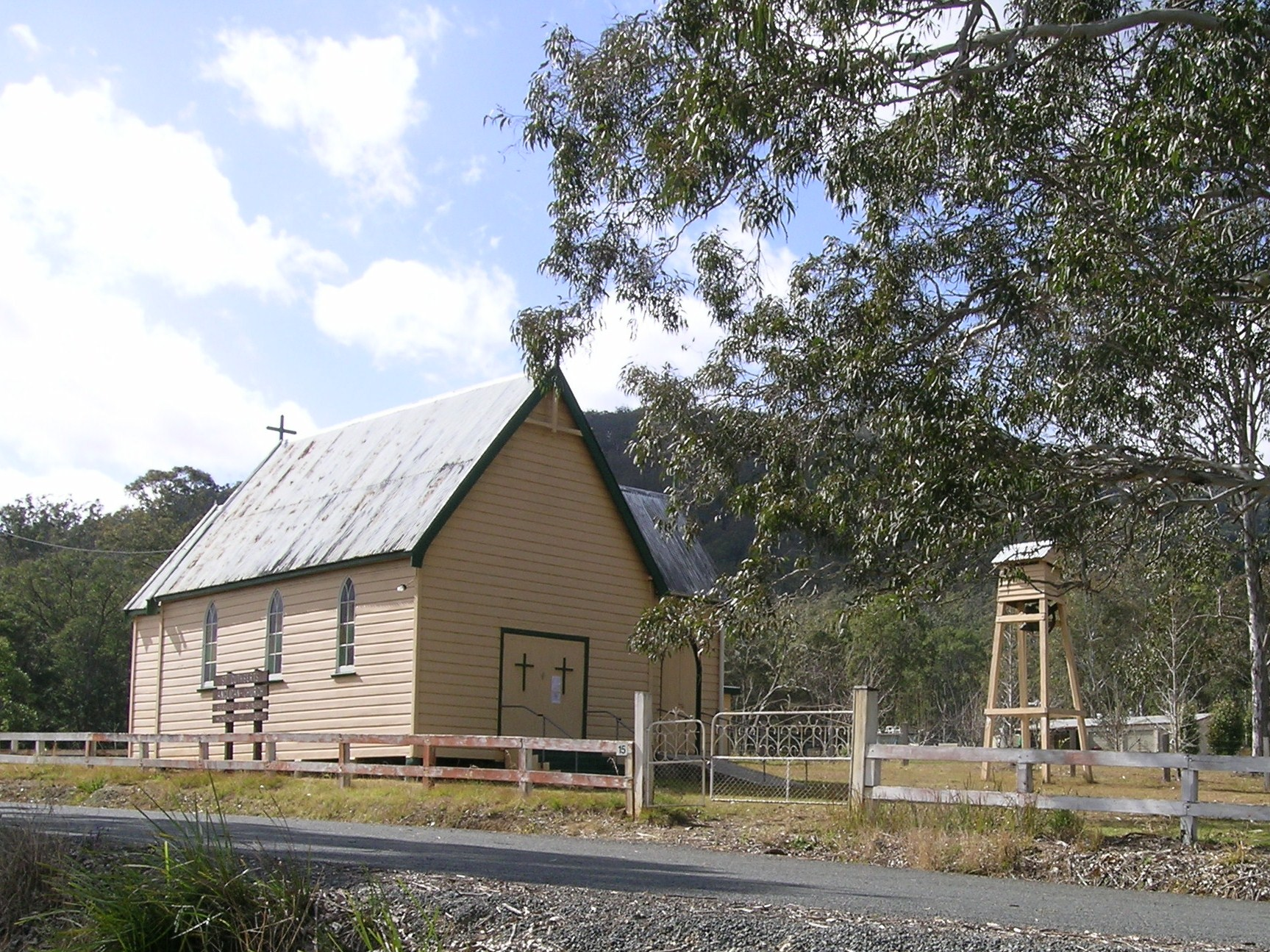
- old Cuthberts Church, (now a private home) Ellenborough

- Coordinates: 31°26′S 152°28′E
- Population: 171 (SAL 2021)
- Postcode(s): 2446
- Elevation: 70 m (230 ft)
- Location: 38 km (24 mi) W of Wauhope; 134 km (83 mi) SE of Walcha; 59 km (37 mi) W of Port Macquarie; 419 km (260 mi) NNE of Sydney
- LGA(s): Port Macquarie-Hastings Council
- County: Macquarie
- State electorate(s): Oxley
- Federal division(s): Lyne
Localities around Ellenborough:
Yarras	Kindee	Pappinbarra
Debenham	Ellenborough	Long Flat
Toms Creek	Comboyne	Byabarra

Ellenborough (/ˈɛlənbərə/) is a parish and village straddling the Oxley Highway and the Ellenborough River, less than one kilometre south of its confluence with the Hastings River. The village is about 38 km west of Wauchope and approximately 130 km east of Walcha. The boundaries are within the Port Macquarie-Hastings Council and Macquarie County.

The village was named by the surveyor and explorer, John Oxley, after Edward Law, 1st Baron Ellenborough (1750–1818), Lord Chief Justice of England and Wales.

The area has a diverse range of birds including bowerbirds, king parrots, kingfishers, honeyeaters and wedge-tailed eagles. Native animals include kangaroos, wallabies, echidnas, koalas and possums. Goannas, turtles and platypus may also be seen and there are fish in the river.

Big Nellie Hakea (Hakea archaeoides) and Tree Guinea Flower (Hibbertia hexandra) are threatened flora species that are growing in the region.

This is mostly an agricultural region with dairy farming and beef cattle breeding the main industries.

Heritage items of significance in the village include: Ellenborough Cemetery and the police station along with the large trees growing there. A camping reserve is situated in the north eastern corner of the village, near the Hastings River.

The Ellenborough Public School has now been closed. The Long Flat village which is about 4 km east of Ellenborough has a public school, hotel, recreation ground and general store. The census does not record Long Flat's population, however the Electoral district of Oxley records show that 296 people voted there in 2007. Long Flat voting in the Division of Lyne recorded 286 voters there in 2007. Ellenborough did not have a polling venue for these elections.

== See also ==
- Long Flat, New South Wales
