= Batar (disambiguation) =

Batar is a rocket launcher.

Batar may also refer to:

- Batar, New South Wales, a locality in Australia
- Batar (river), a river in Ukraine and Hungary
- Batăr, a commune in Bihor County, Romania
- Batar, Pakistan, settlement in Pakistan
- Batar (Bijeljina), settlement in Bosnia and Herzegovina
- Batar, Gujjar gotra
- Batar (IDF) (Bsis Tironut), Israeli Defense Forces recruit-training base

== See also ==
- Betar (disambiguation)
