= Kindee, New South Wales =

Kindee New South Wales
- Coordinates: 31°22′54″S 152°26′4″E
- Population: 91 (2021 census)
- Postcode(s): 2446
- Elevation: 60 m (197 ft)
- Location: 30 km (19 mi) W of Wauchope; 133 km (83 mi) ESE of Walcha; 48 km (30 mi) W of Port Macquarie; 409 km (254 mi) NNE of Sydney
- LGA(s): Port Macquarie-Hastings Council
- County: Macquarie
- State electorate(s): Oxley
- Federal division(s): Lyne
Localities around Kindee:
Birdwood	Birdwood	Pappinbarra
Yarras	Kindee	Pappinbarra
Yarras	Ellenborough	Long Flat

Kindee is a town in New South Wales, Australia. At the 2021 census, it had a population of 91.
