= Betar (disambiguation) =

Betar may refer to:

- In Hebrew (ביתר):
  - Betar (ancient village), an ancient Jewish town and the last standing stronghold of the Bar Kokhba revolt. Several nearby modern locations bear its name:
    - Battir, a Palestinian Arab village in the West Bank and the site of ancient Betar's remains
    - Beitar Illit, an Israeli settlement in the West Bank
    - Mevo Beitar, Jerusalem area town
  - Betar, a Revisionist Zionist youth movement
    - Betar US, American sector of Betar
    - Beitar Jerusalem F.C., a Jerusalem-based Football Club
    - Beitar Tel Aviv F.C., a Tel Aviv-based Football Club in existence until the end of the 1990s
    - Betar Naval Academy
- In Bengali (বেতার):
  - Bangladesh Betar, the state-owned radio broadcaster in Bangladesh
  - Betar Bangla, British radio station based in London aimed at the Bangladeshi community

== People ==
- Ricky Betar (born 2003), Australian Paralympic swimmer
- Timothy John Betar (born 1990), American youtuber

== See also ==
- Batar (disambiguation)
