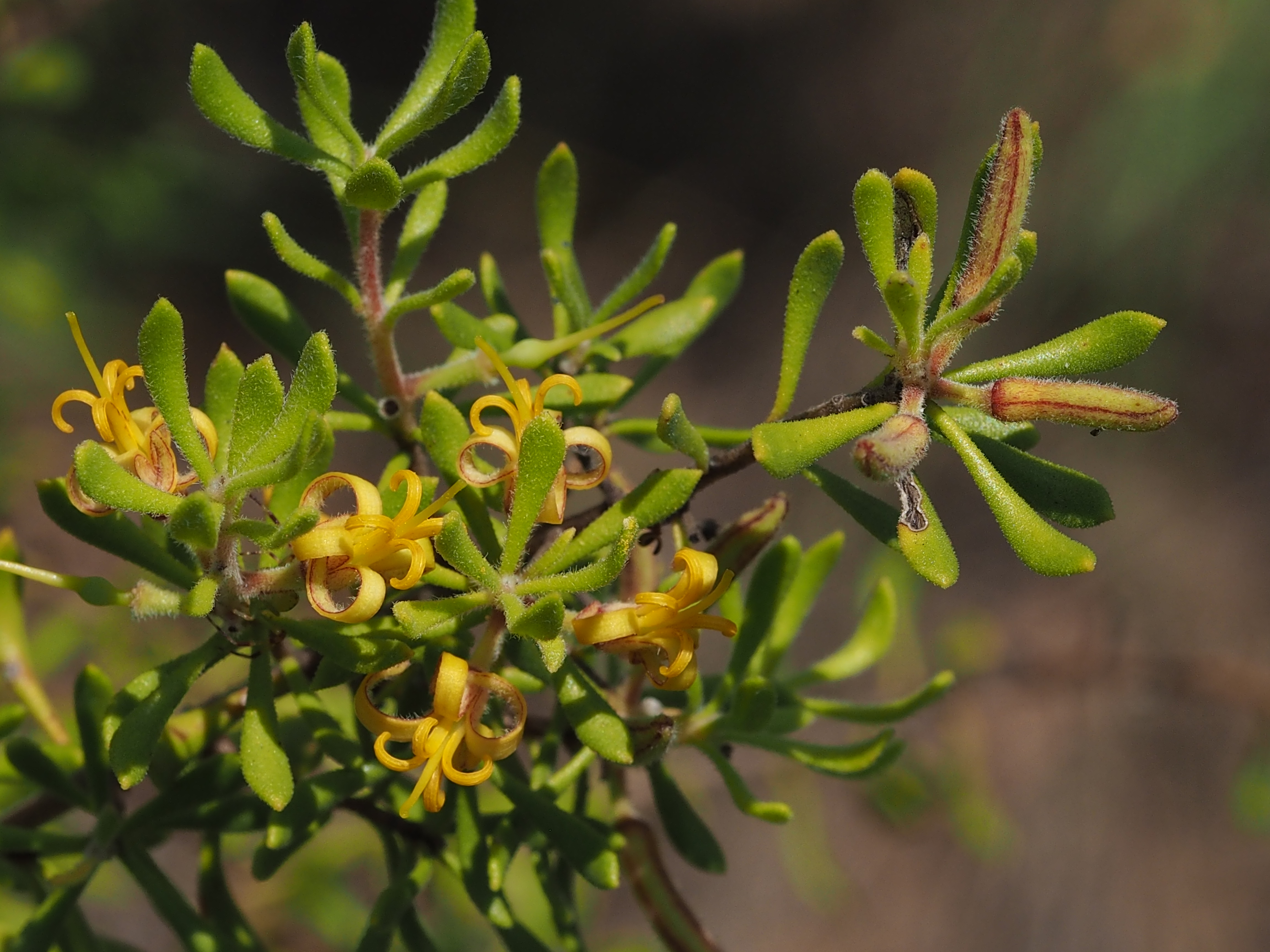

Scientific classification
- Kingdom: Plantae
- Clade: Tracheophytes
- Clade: Angiosperms
- Clade: Eudicots
- Order: Proteales
- Family: Proteaceae
- Genus: Persoonia
- Species: P. cuspidifera

Binomial name
- Persoonia cuspidifera L.A.S.Johnson & P.H.Weston
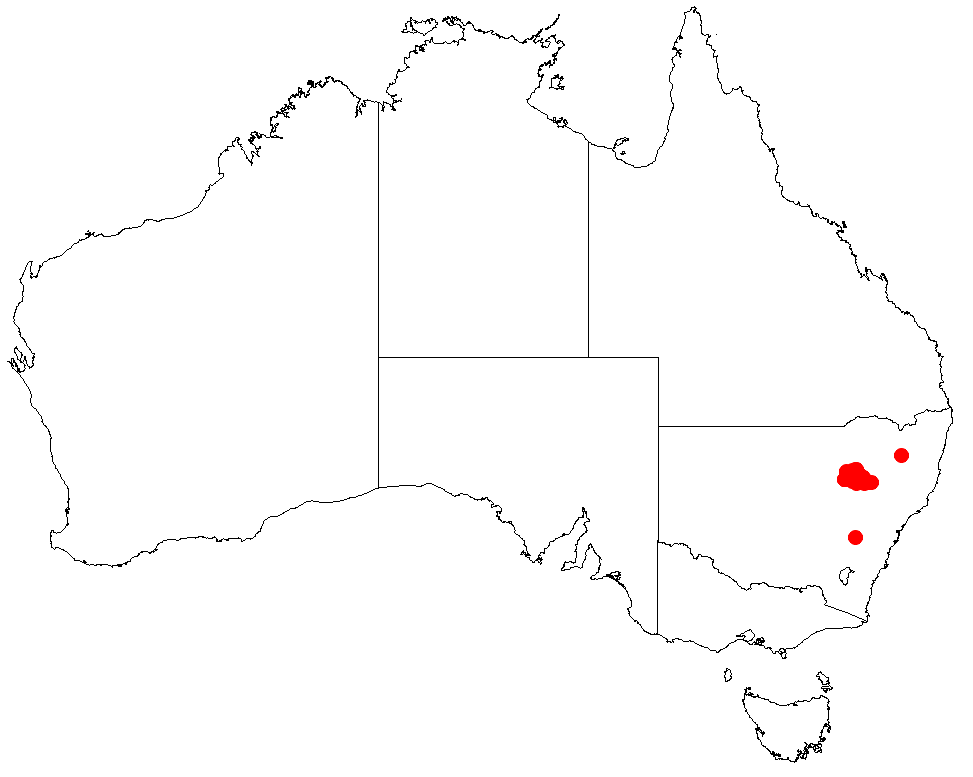
- Occurrence data from Australasian Virtual Herbarium

= Persoonia cuspidifera =

Species of flowering plant

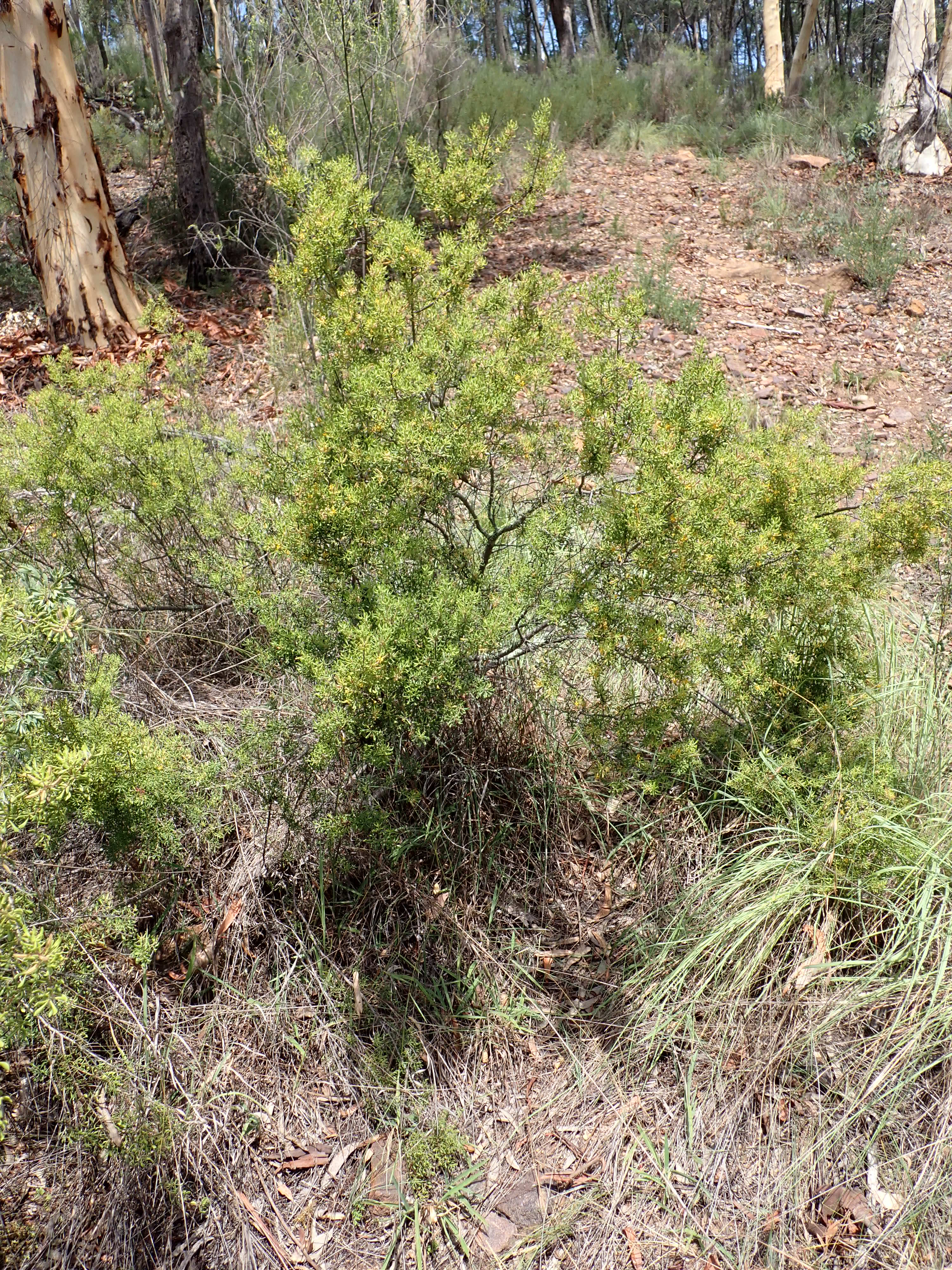
Habit in Coonabarabran

Persoonia cuspidifera is a species of flowering plant in the family Proteaceae and is endemic to northern New South Wales. It is an erect shrub with spatula-shaped leaves and greenish yellow, tube-shaped flowers in groups of up to twenty-five.

== Description ==
Persoonia cuspidifera is an erect shrub that typically grows to a height of 0.3–2 m (1 ft 0 in – 6 ft 7 in) and has hairy young branchlets. Its leaves are spatula-shaped, 10–20 mm (0.39–0.79 in) long and 1.5–5 mm (0.059–0.197 in) wide. The flowers are arranged in groups of up to twenty-five along a rachis up to 70 mm (2.8 in) long, each flower on an erect, hairy pedicel 2–5 mm (0.079–0.197 in) long. The tepals are greenish yellow, 8–12 mm (0.31–0.47 in) long and moderately hairy on the outside and the anthers are yellow. Flowering occurs between November and March and the fruit is a green drupe with purple stripes.

== Taxonomy ==
Persoonia cuspidifera was first formally described in 1991 by Lawrie Johnson and Peter Weston in the journal Telopea from specimens collected near the junction of the Newell and Oxley Highways in 1990. The specific epithet (cuspidifera) means 'bearing a cusp', referring to the shape of the leaves.

== Distribution and habitat ==
This geebung grows in the heathy and scrubby understorey of forest in the Pilliga Scrub and the foothills of the Warrumbungles in northern New South Wales.
