= Fernbank Creek, New South Wales =

Fernbank Creek Port Macquarie, New South Wales
- Coordinates: 31.708°S 152.644°E
- Population: 122 (SAL 2021)
- Postcode(s): 2444
- Location: 7 km (4 mi) NW of the Port Macquarie CBD; 3.5 km (2 mi) S of Blackmans Point
- LGA(s): Port Macquarie-Hastings Council
- State electorate(s): Port Macquarie
- Federal division(s): Cowper

Fernbank Creek is a rural suburb of Port Macquarie, a city in New South Wales. It is approximately 7 km northwest of the Port Macquarie central business district.
