= Byabarra, New South Wales =

Byabarra
- Town
- Coordinates: 31°31′42.8″S 152°32′28.6″E
- Country: Australia
- State: New South Wales
- LGA: Port Macquarie-Hastings Council
- Location: 11 km (6.8 mi) NE of Comboyne; 20 km (12 mi) SW of Wauchope; 37 km (23 mi) WSW of Port Macquarie; 43 km (27 mi) N of Taree

Government
  - State electorate: Oxley
  - Federal division: Lyne

Population
  - Total: 329 (2021 census)
- Postcode: 2446
- County: Macquarie
- Parish: Walibree

Byabarra is a locality and village in Port Macquarie-Hastings Council, New South Wales, Australia. At the 2021 census, the locality of Byabarra had a population of 329.

== History ==
The settlement was originally known as Sleepy Hollow, but was renamed Byabarra in 1914. Byabarra Public School opened in 1895 and was originally known as Thone Creek Provisional School until 1913. The school closed in 2012 due to declining enrollments.
