= Comboyne, New South Wales =

Comboyne Wambuyn (Birrpayi)
- Town
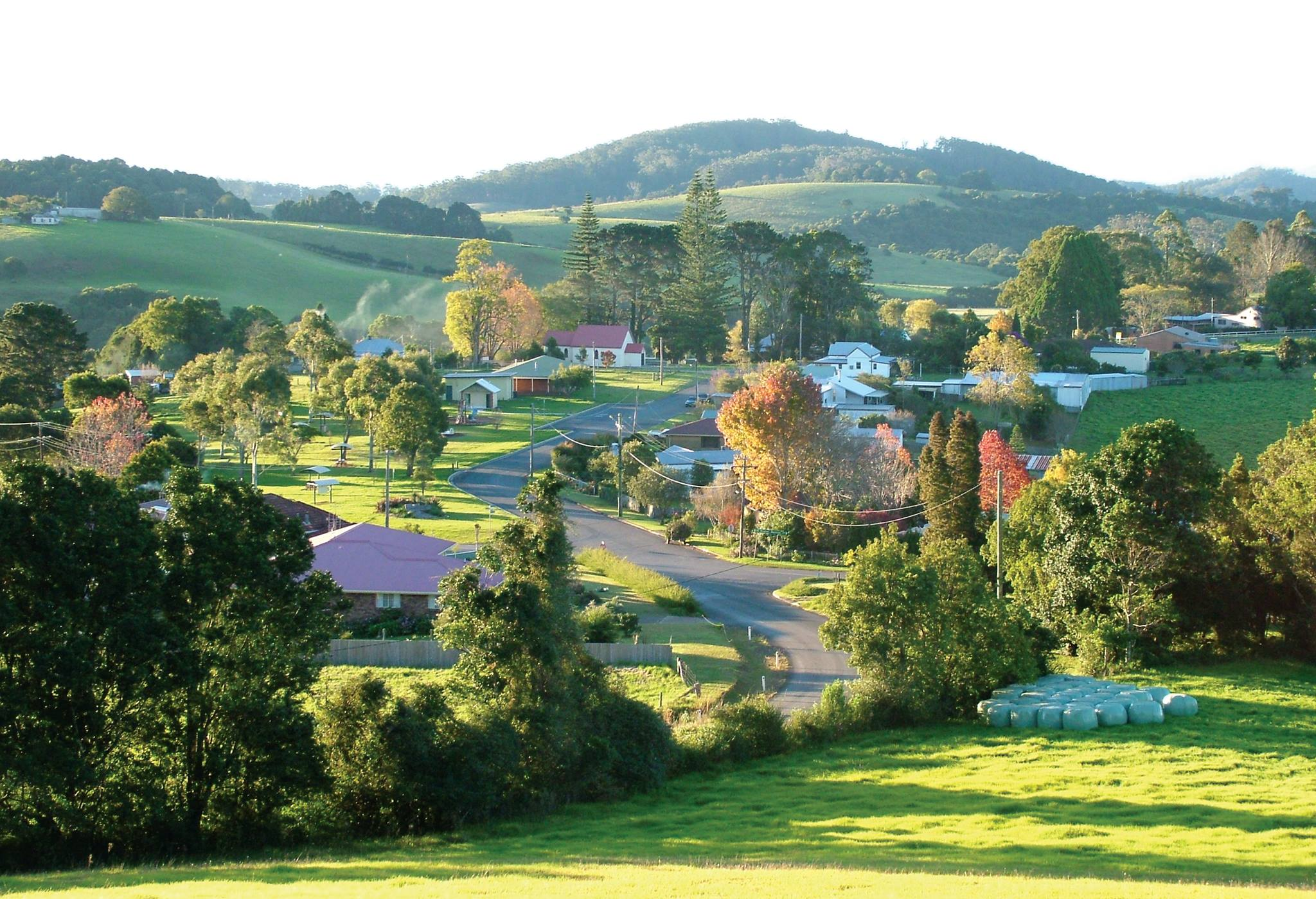
- Comboyne is located on the Comboyne Plateau, an area of rolling hills characterised by red basalt soils and high rainfall.

- Coordinates: 31°36.352′S 152°28.101′E
- Country: Australia
- State: New South Wales
- LGA: Port Macquarie Hastings
- Location: 60 km (37 mi) SW of Port Macquarie; 160 km (99 mi) SE of Walcha; 44 km (27 mi) N of Taree; 377 km (234 mi) NNE of Sydney

Government
  - State electorate: Oxley
  - Federal division: Lyne
- Elevation: 588 m (1,929 ft)

Population
  - Total: 416 (2021 census)
- Postcode: 2429
- Annual rainfall: 1,818 mm (71.6 in)
Localities around Comboyne
Toms Creek	Ellenborough	Byabarra
Innes View	Comboyne	Swans Crossing
Boorganna	Upper Lansdowne	Kerewong

Comboyne (Birrpayi: Wambuyn or Wambutj, both lit. 'kangaroo') is a village on the Mid North Coast region of New South Wales. It is situated on the Comboyne Plateau, some 60 km south-west of Port Macquarie, 35 km west of Kew and 54 km north-west of Taree. It is an attractive agricultural area with fertile soils and a high rainfall. The word "Comboyne" is a corruption of the local Biripi people's name for "a place of kangaroos" (Gambuyn). At the 2021 census, Comboyne had a population of 416.

The Birpai (also known as Birrbay) people have lived in this area for more than 40,000 years.

Previously, the area was covered in sub-tropical rainforest which has almost all been cleared by the early 20th century. The early explorers originally sought the valuable timber of the Australian red cedar. The second oldest natural reserve in the state is at nearby Boorganna Nature Reserve which preserves a remnant of sub-tropical rainforest. The Antarctic beech has been recorded at four sites in the Comboyne area.

== Geology and climate ==
The annual average rainfall at Comboyne is a high 1818 mm. The climate is sub tropical, though at an elevation of 588 metres, it is cooler than at the coast nearby. Soils are derived from basalt, which provide a deep red loam. Below the basalt are less fertile sedimentary rocks. The Comboyne Shield Volcano erupted some 11 to 13 million years ago. The Comboyne plateau is a scarp-bounded paleoplain located between the central north coast of New South Wales and the Great Dividing Range. Miocene basalts overlie much of the plateau, creating relatively fertile red/brown soils. In the southern third of the plateau are underlying Triassic sediments of the Lorne basin. The plateau has a wet, sub tropical climate, though subject to frost and occasional snow.

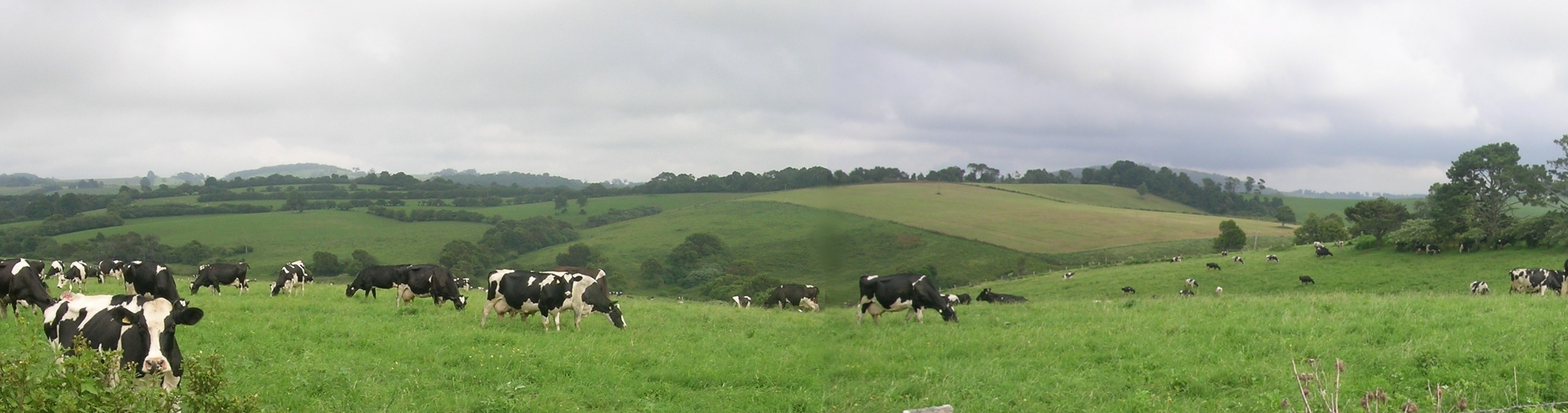
Dairy cattle at Comboyne
