= Bellangry, New South Wales =

Locality in New South Wales, Australia

Bellangry New South Wales
- Coordinates: 31°22′S 152°37′E
- LGA(s): Port Macquarie-Hastings Council
- State electorate(s): Oxley
- Federal division(s): Lyne

Bellangry (/bəˈlæŋɡri/) is a rural locality of Mid-North Council and a Civil Parish of Macquarie County on the Mid North Coast of New South Wales.

The locality is within National Parks.

The Birpai (also known as Birrbay) people have lived in this area for more than 40,000 years.
