= Cairncross Parish (Macquarie County), New South Wales =

Rural locality in New South Wales

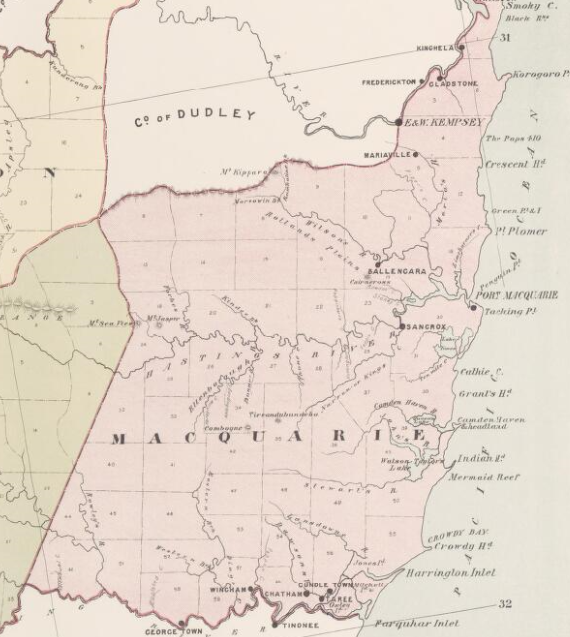
Macquarie County as shown in Johns Sands 1886 map.

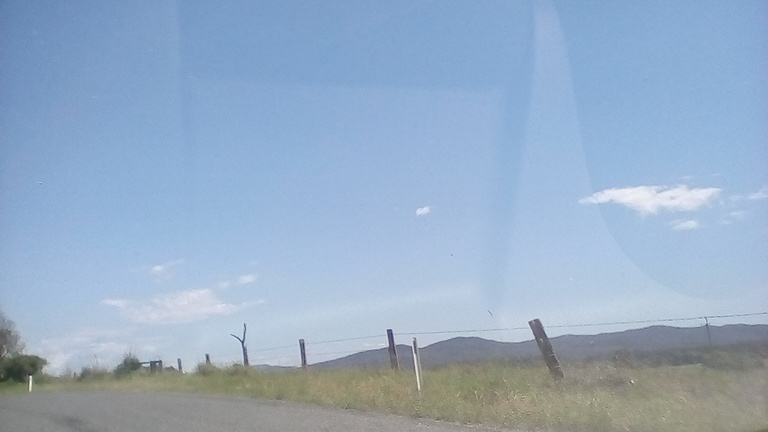
Cairncross Parish (Macquarie County) New South Wales.

Cairncross Parish is a bounded rural locality of Port Macquarie-Hastings Council, New South Wales and a civil parish of Macquarie County on the Mid North Coast.
