= Oxley Highway =

Highway in New South Wales, Australia

Oxley Highway New South Wales

General information
- Type: Highway
- Length: 653 km (406 mi)
- Gazetted: August 1928 (as Main Road 11)
- Route number(s): B56 (2013–present) (Coonabarabran–Port Macquarie)
- Former route number: National Route 34 (1955–2013); Entire route

Major junctions
- West end: Mitchell Highway; Nevertire, New South Wales
- Newell Highway; Castlereagh Highway; Newell Highway; Kamilaroi Highway; New England Highway; Fossickers Way; New England Highway; Pacific Highway
- East end: Gordon Street; Port Macquarie, New South Wales

Location(s)
- Major settlements: Warren, Gilgandra, Coonabarabran, Gunnedah, Tamworth, Bendemeer, Walcha, Wauchope

Highway system
- Highways in Australia; National Highway • Freeways in Australia; Highways in New South Wales

Oxley Highway is a rural highway in New South Wales, Australia, linking Nevertire, Gilgandra, Coonabarabran, Tamworth, and Walcha to Port Macquarie, on the coast of the Tasman Sea. It was named to commemorate John Oxley, the first European to explore much of inland New South Wales in 1818.

== Route ==
Oxley Highway commences at the intersection with Mitchell Highway at Nevertire and travels in an easterly direction through Warren to Gilgandra, where it intersects with Castlereagh Highway. It shares a concurrency with Newell Highway from there to Coonabarabran, where it splits off and heads east again through Gunnedah to Tamworth, where it shares another concurrency with New England Highway from there to Bendemeer. It splits off again and heads east to intersect with Thunderbolts Way at Walcha, continuing east through Yarrowitch, Ellenborough, Long Flat, Wauchope, and intersects with Pacific Highway just east of Wauchope, before eventually terminating at Port Macquarie.

About 45 kilometres of the Yarrowitch to Wauchope section is unfenced and livestock (cattle) may be encountered there, along with other wild animals on most of the highway. Kangaroos are the most likely of those to be spotted, but wombats and other marsupials may be found.

== History ==
Work commenced in 1838 with the use of convicts working from Port Macquarie towards a spot known as "Prisoners' Garden" about 20 km from Yarrowitch. Here it is said that the convicts were chained up each night. In 1842 the track from the Northern Tablelands to Port Macquarie was opened for the first time. Wool carried along this new route reduced the travelling time to 10 days, as opposed to 12–14 weeks for the trip to Maitland. The section from Walcha to Bendemeer existed as a mapped road in 1857, was surveyed in 1867, and proclaimed a Parish Road in c.1889. West of Walcha the road was only suitable for bullock teams and they too had difficulties, especially with the ranges.

The steep range section from Yarras to Yarrowitch was in serious need of repair in 1925 when the Main Roads Board was formed. Following a re-survey in 1927 the road was altered between Yarras and Tobins Camp.

The passing of the Main Roads Act of 1924 through the Parliament of New South Wales provided for the declaration of Main Roads, roads partially funded by the State government through the Main Roads Board (later Transport for NSW). Oxley Highway was declared (as Main Road No. 11) from the intersection with North Coast Highway (today Pacific Highway) near Wauchope, via Walcha, Tamworth, Gunnedah, Coonabarabran, and Gilgrandra to the intersection with North-Western Highway (today Mitchell Highway) at Trangie, Main Road 202 was declared from Nevertire to Warren (and continuing north to Quambone eventually to Coonabrarbran), and Main Road 203 was declared from Warren to Collie, on the same day, 8 August 1928; with the passing of the Main Roads (Amendment) Act of 1929 to provide for additional declarations of State Highways and Trunk Roads, these were amended to State Highway 11 and Main Roads 202 and 203 on 8 April 1929.

Oxley Highway was split into two parts, with the section between Tamworth and Bendemeer defined as part of Great Northern Highway (known as New England Highway from March 1933), on 23 June 1931; as a consequence Oxley Highway was re-declared to run from Trangie to Tamworth, and then from Bendemeer to Wauchope. On 30 September 1933 the section between Walcha and Port Macquarie was officially opened; Walcha Shire maintained 106 km of the highway until July 1966 when this part was taken over by the Department of Main Roads.

The western end of the highway was rerouted through Warren to terminate at Nevertire instead on 13 June 1951, subsuming Main Road 203 and the alignment of Main Road 202 between Warren and Nevertire; Main Road 202 was truncated at Warren as a result, and Main Road 347 was extended along the old alignment from Collie to Trangie (and continuing south via Albert to Melrose). Newell Highway was declared a National Highway in 1992, and was re-declared to form one continuous highway on 15 January 1993: as a consequence, Oxley Highway was split into three parts, re-declared to run from the intersection with Mitchell Highway in Nevertire to the intersection with Newell Highway in Gilgandra, then from the intersection with Newell Highway just northeast of Coonabarabran to Tamworth, and then from Bendemeer to Port Macquarie.

The passing of the Roads Act of 1993 updated road classifications and the way they could be declared within New South Wales. Under this act, Oxley Highway today retains its declaration as Highway 11, from Nevertire to Gilgandra, then from Coonabarabran to Tamworth, and then from Bendemeer to Port Macquarie.

Oxley Highway was signed National Route 34 across its entire length in 1955. With the conversion to the newer alphanumeric system in 2013, this was replaced with route B56 between Coonabarabran and Port Macquarie, with the rest of the highway west of Coonabarabran unallocated.

== Major intersections ==
| LGA | Location | km | mi | Destinations | Notes |
|---|---|---|---|---|---|
| Warren | Nevertire | 0.0 | 0.0 | Mitchell Highway (A32 northwest, southeast) – Broken Hill, Bourke, Nyngan, Dubbo | Western terminus of western section of highway |
| Warren | Nevertire | 0.0 | 0.0 | Nevertire-Bogan Road (southwest) – Tottenham, Tullamore | |
| Gilgandra | Gilgandra | 105.0 | 65.2 | Castlereagh Highway (B55 north) – Coonamble, Walgett | Western terminus of concurrency with Castlereagh Highway |
| Gilgandra | Gilgandra | 105.1 | 65.3 | Newell Highway (A39 south) – Dubbo, Parkes | Eastern terminus of western section of highway |
Gap in route
| Warrumbungle | Coonabarabran | 204.3 | 126.9 | Newell Highway (A39 north) – Narrabri, Moree | Western terminus of central section of highway Western terminus of route B56 |
| Gunnedah | Gunnedah | 305.2 | 189.6 | Mungindi railway line | |
| Gunnedah | Gunnedah | 305.6 | 189.9 | Kamilaroi Highway (B51 north) – Boggabri, Narrabri | Concurrency with Kamilaroi Highway |
| Gunnedah | Gunnedah | 307.8 | 191.3 | Kamilaroi Highway (B51 south) – Quirindi | Concurrency with Kamilaroi Highway |
| Peel River | | 381.1 | 236.8 | Bridge (no known official name) | |
| Tamworth | Tamworth | 378.8 | 235.4 | Main North railway line | |
| Tamworth | Tamworth | 381.7 | 237.2 | Fossickers Way (B95) – Manilla, Warialda | |
| Tamworth | Tamworth | 382.8 | 237.9 | New England Highway (A15 south) – Scone, Aberdeen | Eastern terminus of central section of highway |
Gap in route
| Tamworth | Bendemeer | 422.4 | 262.5 | New England Highway (A15 north) – Uralla, Armidale | Western terminus of eastern section of highway |
| Walcha | Woolbrook | 447.5 | 278.1 | Main North railway line | |
| Walcha | Walcha | 472.0 | 293.3 | Thunderbolts Way – Uralla, Nowendoc, Gloucester | |
| Apsley River | | 472.1 | 293.3 | Blue Hogan Bridge | |
| Tia River | | 507.5 | 315.3 | Bridge (no known official name) | |
| Yarrowitch River | | 520.5 | 323.4 | Bridge (no known official name) | |
| Ellenborough River | | 601.6 | 373.8 | Bridge (no known official name) | |
| Port Macquarie-Hastings | Wauchope | 635.4 | 394.8 | North Coast railway line | |
| Port Macquarie-Hastings | Sancrox-Thrumster boundary | 644.4 | 400.4 | Pacific Highway (A1) – Kempsey, Macksville, Taree, Newcastle | |
| Port Macquarie-Hastings | Port Macquarie | 653.0 | 405.8 | Hastings River Drive (north) – Telegraph Point, to Pacific Highway; Ocean Drive (south) – Lake Cathie, Laurieton | |
| Port Macquarie-Hastings | Port Macquarie | 653.0 | 405.8 | Gordon Street – Port Macquarie | Eastern terminus of eastern section of highway Eastern terminus of route B56 |
1.000 mi = 1.609 km; 1.000 km = 0.621 mi: Concurrency terminus; Route transition

== Gallery ==
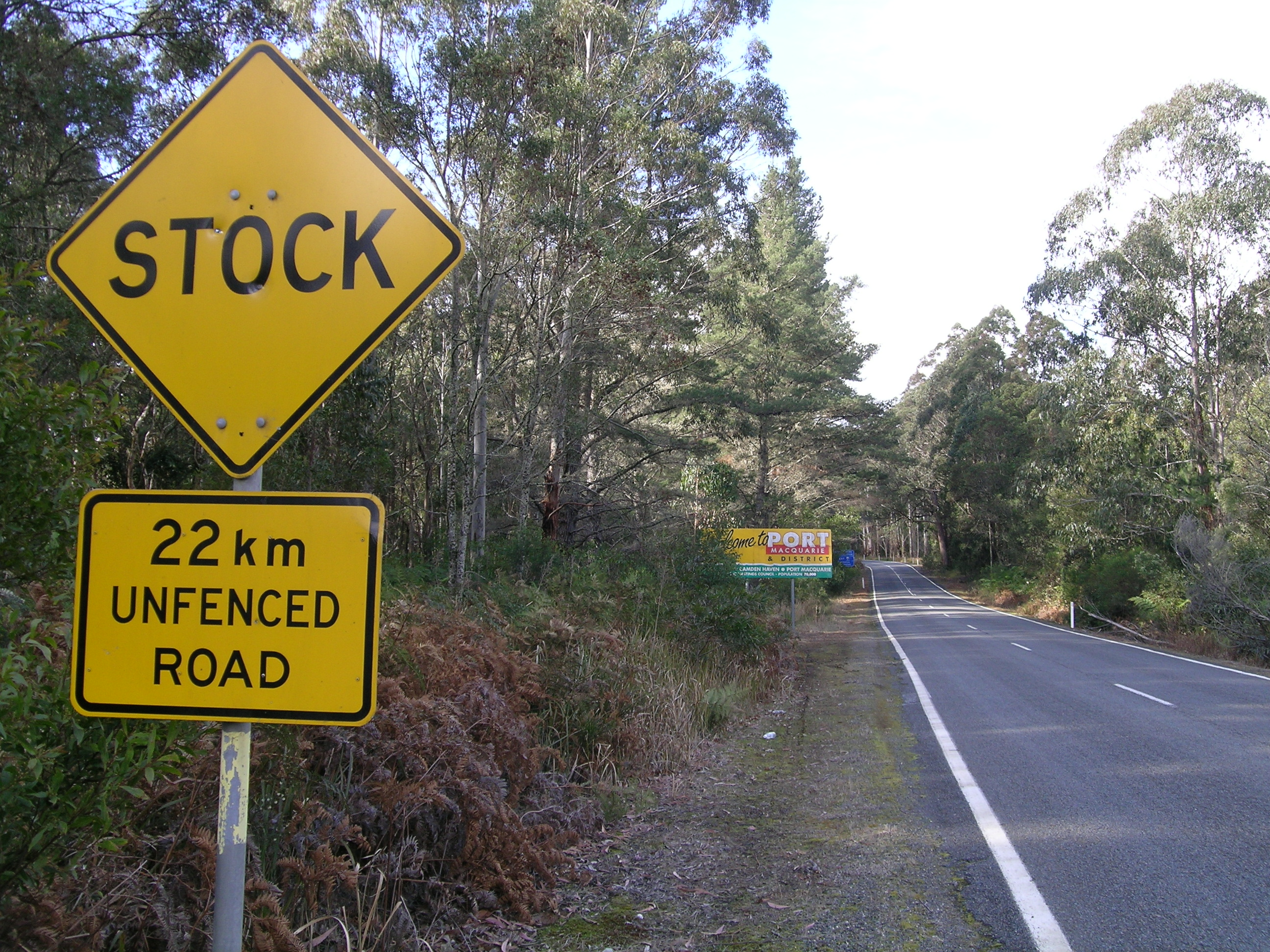
Signs, Oxley Highway.

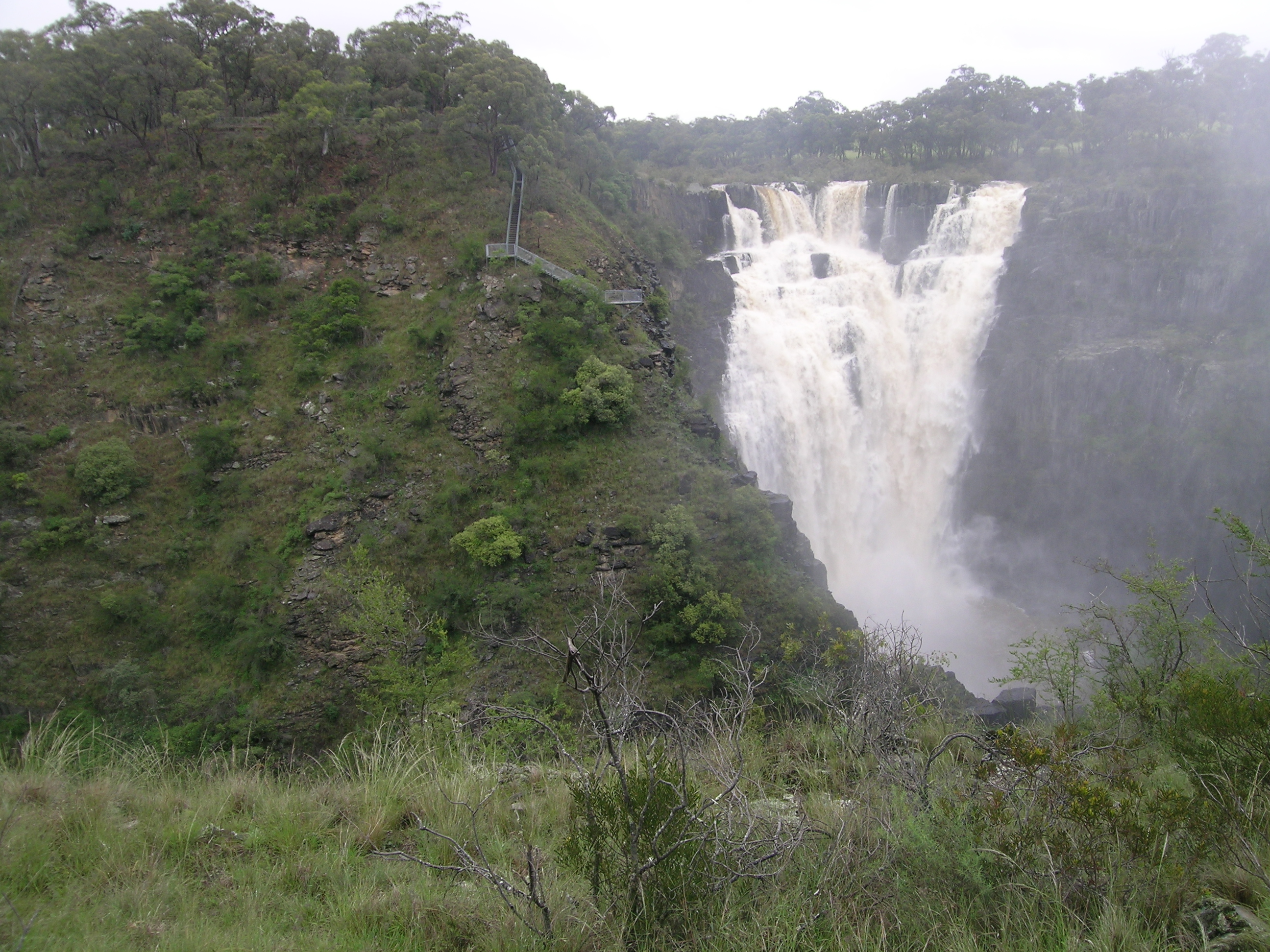
The Apsley Falls are located adjacent to the Oxley Highway, near Walcha.

== See also ==
- Highways in Australia
- Highways in New South Wales
