= The Hatch, New South Wales =

The Hatch Port Macquarie, New South Wales
- Coordinates: 31.366°S 152.850°E
- Population: 44 (SAL 2021)
- Postcode(s): 2444
- LGA(s): Port Macquarie-Hastings Council
- State electorate(s): Port Macquarie
- Federal division(s): Cowper

The Hatch is a rural suburb of Port Macquarie, a city in New South Wales.

The Hatch is home to The Hatch Farm, a 150-acre working farm with accommodation, located on the bank of the Maria River, a watercourse of the Hastings River catchment.
