= Hibbard, New South Wales =

Hibbard
- Suburb
- Interactive map of Hibbard
- Coordinates: 31.4197405°S 152.858002°E
- Country: Australia
- State: New South Wales
- City: Port Macquarie
- LGA: Port Macquarie-Hastings Council

Government
  - State electorate: Port Macquarie
  - Federal division: Cowper
- Postcode: 2444

Hibbard (/ˈhɪbɑːrd/) is an unbounded locality located within the town of Port Macquarie, New South Wales.

The Port Macquarie Airport and the Port Macquarie Regional Stadium are both located in Hibbard.
