= Kippara, New South Wales =

Civil parish in New South Wales, Australia

Coordinates: 31.235°S 152.521°E

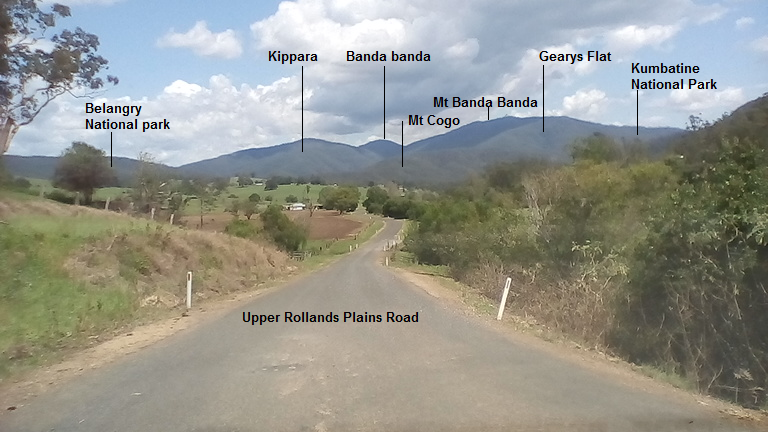
Kippara

Kippara is a civil parish of Macquarie County, New South Wales, Australia, and a bounded rural locality of Mid-North Coast Council on the Mid North Coast.

The civil parish is predominantly in Willi Willi National Park.
