= Birdwood, New South Wales =

Birdwood
- Town
- Coordinates: 31°20′54″S 152°20′4″E
- Country: Australia
- State: New South Wales
- LGA: Port Macquarie-Hastings Council

Government
  - State electorate: Oxley
  - Federal division: Lyne
- Elevation: 155 m (509 ft)

Population
  - Total: 34 (2021 census)
- Postcode: 2446
- County: Macquarie
- Mean max temp: 24.4 °C (75.9 °F)
- Mean min temp: 11.9 °C (53.4 °F)
- Annual rainfall: 1,964.7 mm (77.35 in)

Birdwood is a town in New South Wales, Australia about 1 hour 6 minutes drive south of Port Macquarie. At the 2021 census, it had a population of 34.

== Geography ==
=== Climate ===
Birdwood experiences a humid subtropical climate (Köppen: Cfa) with moderately hot and very wet summers and quite mild, drier winters. The town has 101.8 clear days and 113.6 cloudy days. The wettest recorded day was 23 February 2013 with 415.2 mm (16.35 in) of rainfall. Extreme temperatures ranged from 43.2 °C (109.8 °F) on 12 February 2017 to −5.1 °C (22.8 °F) on 18 July 1970.

Climate data was sourced from the nearby Mount Seaview.

Climate data for Birdwood (Mount Seaview) (31.39°S 152.25°E) (155 m (509 ft) AMSL) (1949-2025)
Month	Jan	Feb	Mar	Apr	May	Jun	Jul	Aug	Sep	Oct	Nov	Dec	Year
Record high °C (°F)	42.2 (108.0)	43.2 (109.8)	40.6 (105.1)	35.5 (95.9)	29.5 (85.1)	26.7 (80.1)	27.5 (81.5)	34.1 (93.4)	36.2 (97.2)	41.4 (106.5)	42.5 (108.5)	41.4 (106.5)	43.2 (109.8)
Mean daily maximum °C (°F)	29.3 (84.7)	28.2 (82.8)	26.8 (80.2)	24.5 (76.1)	21.3 (70.3)	18.9 (66.0)	18.7 (65.7)	20.5 (68.9)	23.7 (74.7)	25.7 (78.3)	27.0 (80.6)	28.8 (83.8)	24.5 (76.0)
Mean daily minimum °C (°F)	17.7 (63.9)	17.5 (63.5)	15.9 (60.6)	12.7 (54.9)	9.4 (48.9)	7.1 (44.8)	5.6 (42.1)	6.2 (43.2)	8.8 (47.8)	11.6 (52.9)	14.2 (57.6)	16.3 (61.3)	11.9 (53.5)
Record low °C (°F)	9.9 (49.8)	9.5 (49.1)	3.6 (38.5)	3.0 (37.4)	−0.6 (30.9)	−2.5 (27.5)	−5.1 (22.8)	−1.6 (29.1)	0.0 (32.0)	2.5 (36.5)	4.2 (39.6)	7.6 (45.7)	−5.1 (22.8)
Average precipitation mm (inches)	269.6 (10.61)	275.7 (10.85)	273.2 (10.76)	161.0 (6.34)	137.0 (5.39)	120.5 (4.74)	68.8 (2.71)	74.5 (2.93)	77.3 (3.04)	134.9 (5.31)	174.2 (6.86)	199.7 (7.86)	1,964.7 (77.35)
Average precipitation days (≥ 0.2 mm)	18.4	18.2	18.8	15.5	14.6	13.6	11.9	10.9	10.9	14.7	16.5	17.4	181.4
Average afternoon relative humidity (%)	60	64	64	62	62	61	55	48	48	54	57	58	58
Average dew point °C (°F)	18.3 (64.9)	18.6 (65.5)	17.5 (63.5)	14.6 (58.3)	11.8 (53.2)	9.2 (48.6)	7.3 (45.1)	6.8 (44.2)	9.3 (48.7)	12.6 (54.7)	15.0 (59.0)	17.1 (62.8)	13.2 (55.7)
Source: Bureau of Meteorology (1949-2025)
