= Betar Bangla =

Coordinates: 51.5329°N 0.0176°W

- London; England
- Broadcast area: East London
- Frequency: 1503 AM

Programming
- Language: Bengali

History
- First air date: 23 January 2000

Links
- Webcast: Listen live
- Website: www.betarbangla.org.uk

Betar Bangla (Bengali: বেতার বাংলা) is a British radio station based in London aimed at the Bangladeshi community in the UK.

== History ==
Betar Bangla was launched in 2000 and is the first radio station to serve the Bangladeshi community in the UK. It broadcasts programmes for integrated community of Bengalis.

The radio station is staffed by Bangladeshis volunteers from the local community and delivers 24-hour radio broadcasting for the Bengali community in East London.

The programmes include news, current affairs, music, literacy, health & fitness, and legal issues and citizens' rights.

In June 2010, it was awarded a full radio broadcast license from Ofcom to broadcast as a community radio station on 1503 AM. Since January 2011, it has been broadcasting 24/7.
