= Toms Creek, New South Wales =

Toms Creek New South Wales
- Coordinates: 31°32′54″S 152°24′4″E
- Population: 33 (2021 census)
- Postcode(s): 2446
- LGA(s): Port Macquarie-Hastings Council
- County: Macquarie
- State electorate(s): Oxley
- Federal division(s): Lyne

Toms Creek is a town in New South Wales, Australia. At the 2021 census, it had a population of 33.
