= Thrumster, New South Wales =

Thrumster New South Wales
- Coordinates: 31.457369°S 152.83235°E
- Population: 2,382 (SAL 2021)
- Postcode(s): 2444
- Location: 9.1 km (6 mi) WSW of Port Macquarie
- LGA(s): Port Macquarie-Hastings Council
- State electorate(s): Port Macquarie
- Federal division(s): Cowper; Lyne

Thrumster is a suburb of Port Macquarie, a town in New South Wales. The suburb recorded a population of 2,382 at the 2021 census.

Thrumster is home to the Port Macquarie Service Centre (locally known as "The Donut"), located on the Oxley Highway. Suburban development has occurred in the area since the 2000s with the construction of the Sovereign Hills housing estate beginning in 2008.

While Port Macquarie itself is known for its large koala population, Thrumster is known to have a particularly high koala population, even by Port Macquarie standards.
