= Bonny Hills =

- Town
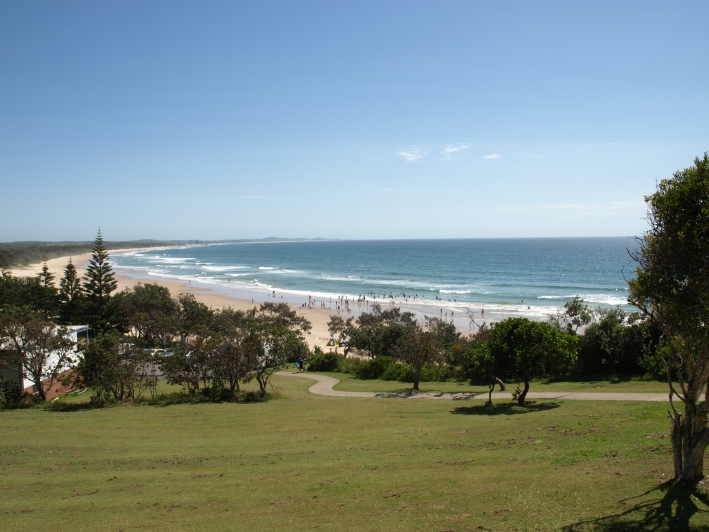
- View of Rainbow Beach

- Coordinates: 31°35′S 152°50′E
- Country: Australia
- State: New South Wales
- City: Camden Haven
- LGA: Port Macquarie-Hastings Council

Government
  - State electorate: Port Macquarie
  - Federal division: Lyne

Population
  - Total: 3,045 (2021 census)
- Postcode: 2445

Bonny Hills is a town in New South Wales, Australia on the Tasman Sea coast about 18 km south of Port Macquarie.

The Wauchope–Bonny Hills Surf Life Saving Club is the longest established organisation within the town and has been continuously operating since 1958. The Surf Club built a new club house at their headquarters of Rainbow Beach in 2009 replacing the original building which was built by voluntary local efforts in 1959.

Bonny Hills has a service station, local Tavern, local beach, two holiday parks, post office and a fire station.

The Birpai (also known as Birrbay) people have lived in this area for more than 40,000 years.

== History ==
=== Pre-establishment ===
In 1818, explorer John Oxley passed through the area, camping on a "sandy beach", which in modern-day is known as Bartlett's Beach.

=== Establishment and growth ===
Bonny Hills was originally known as Green Hills, or colloquially as "Creamy". Much of the land was owned by A. D. Suters, the only permanent resident, with four other weekender houses owned by his brothers, Eddie and Jack Suters, and Colin Bain. In March 1933, Thomas R. (Tom) Bartlett, coming from Wauchope, visited Green Hills with his son, Arthur, and working partner Ted Hungerford, immediately purchasing 20 acres of land from A.D. Suters, later purchasing another 162 acres. The Bartlett family cleared an area and built a house, moving in around 28 December 1933.

Acreage of passionfruit vines were planted and sold to campers, but this endeavour was wiped out in 1938 by a strong, three-day wind. In 1946, banana and pineapple seeds were also planted in the area, becoming a popular industry until 1955, when Arthur Bartlett dug up the trees and ploughed the land back into grass.

Some years earlier, in 1944, a dam was built to supply water to Green Hills. In December 1946, Bob Adamson, representing E. Adamson and Sons, approached the permanent residents, wishing to buy a piece of land and erect a post office and telephone exchange. Into the following year, the postal department expressed that they could not construct a post office until they changed the town's name, as there were many other "Green Hills". A Progress Association meeting was called and a new name was voted on, initially deciding on "Grants Head" (as it read on most maps), before a woman suggested "Bonny Hills", winning over the majority.

During the 1950s, A. D. Suters also left the area, selling his land to Laurieton resident Mr. McGilvray. After the Bartlett family left the area in 1956, Little Beach was soon renamed "Bartlett Beach", along with Big Beach being renamed "Rainbow Beach".

On 8 October 1958, the Wauchope–Bonny Hills Surf Life Saving Club was formed, superseding the Wauchope Surf Life Saving Club that had been defunct since right before World War II. They initially patrolled Bartlett Beach, before deciding to move over to Rainbow Beach, where a clubhouse was constructed from 1962 to 1964.

In 2009, the old Surf Life Saving clubhouse was torn down and replaced with a brand new clubhouse, which was inaugurated in the following year.

== Population ==
Historical population
Year	Pop.	±%
1976	261	—
1981	538	+106.1%
1986	873	+62.3%
1991	1,204	+37.9%
1996	1,469	+22.0%
2001	2,191	+49.1%
2006	2,540	+15.9%
2011	2,659	+4.7%
2016	2,760	+3.8%
2021	2,825	+2.4%
Source: Australian Bureau of Statistics data.

In the 2021 Census, there were 2,825 people in Bonny Hills. 87.4% of people were born in Australia. The next most common country of birth was England 3.8%. 94.4% of people spoke only English at home. The most common responses for religion were No Religion 36.0%, Anglican 21.3% and Catholic 20.9%.
