= Sancrox =

Sancrox Port Macquarie, New South Wales
- Coordinates: 31.433°S 152.783°E
- Population: 602 (SAL 2021)
- Postcode(s): 2446
- LGA(s): Port Macquarie-Hastings Council
- State electorate(s): Port Macquarie
- Federal division(s): Lyne

Sancrox is an industrial area and suburb of Port Macquarie, a city in New South Wales.

Sancrox is home to the Billabong Zoo.
