= Blackmans Point, New South Wales =

Blackmans Point Port Macquarie, New South Wales
- Coordinates: 31.38859045°S 152.830704621257°E
- Population: 178 (SAL 2021)
- Postcode(s): 2444
- LGA(s): Port Macquarie-Hastings Council
- State electorate(s): Oxley; Port Macquarie
- Federal division(s): Cowper; Lyne

Blackmans Point is a rural suburb of Port Macquarie, a city in New South Wales.
