= Lake Cathie, New South Wales =

Lake Cathie New South Wales
- Coordinates: 31.552°S 152.855°E
- Population: 4,296 (2021 census)
- LGA(s): Port Macquarie-Hastings Council
- State electorate(s): Port Macquarie
- Federal division(s): Lyne

Lake Cathie /ˈkætaɪ/ is a town in New South Wales, Australia about 15 minutes drive south of Port Macquarie. At the 2021 census, it had a population of 4,296.

The Birpai (also known as Birrbay) people have lived in this area for more than 40,000 years.

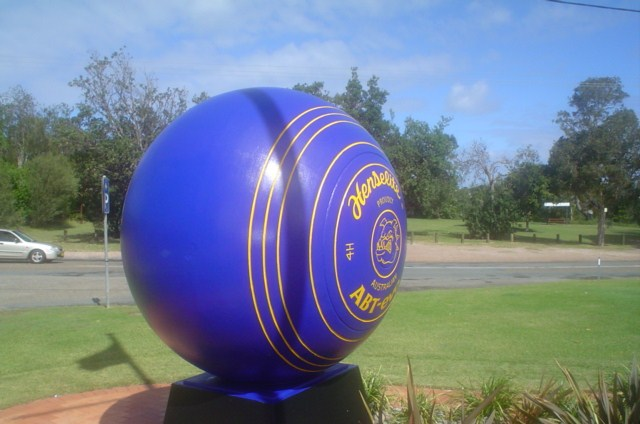
World's largest Bowl at Lake Cathie

== Commercial area ==
The town is a popular holiday destination on the Mid North Coast because of its tranquil location which hosts the lake, lagoon and beaches. It has a Woolworths supermarket, local Tavern, Lake Cathie Bowling Club, bakery, fish & chip shop, coffee shop, pharmacy, post office, a newsagent and a bargain shop. Its main feature is a tidal lake fed by the ocean daily. Several times throughout the year the lake is closed over by shifting sands and becomes dark in colour due to the tannins in the local flora. Tourism centres on the lake as it is a popular swimming and fishing spot all year round especially when the lake is open.

== Population ==
Historical population
Year	Pop.	±%
1976	493	—
1981	941	+90.9%
1986	1,153	+22.5%
1991	1,474	+27.8%
1996	1,774	+20.4%
2001	2,094	+18.0%
2006	2,736	+30.7%
2011	2,873	+5.0%
2016	2,925	+1.8%
2021	4,049	+38.4%
Source: Australian Bureau of Statistics data.

According to the 2021 Australian census, there were 4,296 people in Lake Cathie.

- Aboriginal and Torres Strait Islander people made up 4.8% of the population.
- 86.3% of people were born in Australia. The next most common country of birth was England at 4.4%.
- 94.4% of people spoke only English at home.
- The most common responses for religion were No Religion at 37.7%, Catholic at 21.2% and Anglican at 21.1%.

== Notable people ==
- Trent Milton (born 1972), Paralympic snowboarder

== See also ==
- List of World's Largest Roadside Attractions
