= Port Macquarie-Hastings Council =

Port Macquarie-Hastings
- Local government area
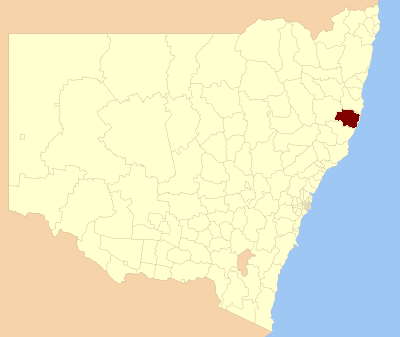
- Location in New South Wales

- Interactive map of Port Macquarie-Hastings
- Coordinates: 31°26′S 152°54′E
- Country: Australia
- State: New South Wales
- Region: Mid North Coast
- Established: 1 January 1981 (Municipality of Hastings); 13 July 2005 (Port Macquarie-Hastings Council)
- Council seat: Port Macquarie

Government
  - Mayor: Adam Roberts (Independent)
  - State electorates: Port Macquarie; Oxley
  - Federal divisions: Cowper; Lyne

Area
  - Total: 3,686.1 km^{2} (1,423.2 sq mi)

Population
  - Totals: 86,762 (2021 census); 88,311 (2022 est.)
  - Density: 23.5376/km^{2} (60.9621/sq mi)
- Website: Port Macquarie-Hastings
LGAs around Port Macquarie-Hastings
Walcha	Kempsey	Tasman Sea
Walcha	Port Macquarie-Hastings	Tasman Sea
MidCoast	MidCoast	Tasman Sea

Port Macquarie-Hastings Council is a local government area in the Mid North Coast region of New South Wales, Australia.

The area is located adjacent to the Hastings River, the Pacific Highway, the Oxley Highway and the North Coast railway line. Major population centres in the local government area are Port Macquarie, Camden Haven, Wauchope, Lake Cathie and Kendall.

The mayor of the Port Macquarie-Hastings Council since 30 September 2024 is Adam Roberts, an independent politician.

== Port Macquarie suburbs ==
- Blackmans Point
- Port Macquarie CBD (not a suburb)
- Fernbank Creek
- Flynns Beach
- Hibbard
- Innes View
- Lake Innes
- Limeburners Creek
- North Shore
- Port Macquarie
- Sancrox
- Sovereign Hills
- Tacking Point
- The Hatch
- Thrumster

== Towns and localities ==
Towns and localities (including Port Macquarie suburbs) in the Port Macquarie-Hastings Council are:

- Port Macquarie (seat)
- Bagnoo
- Bago
- Ballengarra
- Banda Banda
- Batar
- Beechwood
- Bellangry
- Birdwood
- Black Creek
- Blackmans Point
- Bobs Creek
- Bonny Hills
- Boorganna
- Bril Bril
- Brombin
- Byabarra
- Cairncross
- Camden Haven
- Camden Head
- Comboyne
- Cooperabung (part)
- Crosslands
- Deauville
- Debenham
- Diamond Head
- Dondingalong (part)
- Doyles River
- Dunbogan
- Ellenborough
- Fernbank Creek
- Forbes River
- Frazers Creek
- Gearys Flat
- Grants Beach
- Gum Scrub
- Hacks Ferry
- Hartys Plains
- Herons Creek
- Hollisdale
- Huntingdon
- Hyndmans Creek
- Innes View
- Jolly Nose
- Kendall
- Kerewong
- Kew
- Kindee
- King Creek
- Kippara
- Lake Cathie
- Lake Innes
- Laurieton
- Limeburners Creek
- Logans Crossing
- Long Flat
- Lorne
- Lower Pappinbarra
- Marlo Merrican
- Middle Brother
- Mortons Creek
- Mount Seaview
- North Brother
- North Haven
- North Shore
- Pappinbarra
- Pembrooke
- Pipeclay
- Port Macquarie
- Rawdon Island
- Redbank
- Riverside
- Rollands Plains
- Rosewood
- Rossglen
- Sancrox
- Swans Crossing
- Telegraph Point
- The Hatch
- Thrumster
- Toms Creek
- Upper Pappinbarra
- Upper Rollands Plains
- Upsalls Creek
- Wauchope
- Werrikimbe
- West Haven
- Yarras
- Yippin Creek

== Demographics ==
At the 2021 Census, there were 86,762 people in the Port Macquarie-Hastings local government area, of these 47.9% were male and 52.1% were female. Aboriginal and Torres Strait Islander people made up 5.5% of the population, significantly higher than the national average. The median age of people in the Port Macquarie-Hastings Council area was 49 years; eleven years higher than the national median. Children aged 0 – 14 years made up 15.9% of the population and people aged 65 years and over made up 29.1% of the population. Of people in the area aged 15 years and over, 47.9% were married and 15.4% were either divorced or separated.

Population growth in the Port Macquarie-Hastings Council area between the 2001 Census and the 2006 Census was 6.68%; and in the subsequent five years to the 2011 Census was 6.23%. When compared with total population growth of Australia for the same periods, being 5.78% and 8.32% respectively, population growth in the Port Macquarie-Hastings local government area was generally on par with the national average. The median weekly income for residents within the Port Macquarie-Hastings Council area was slightly below the national average.

At the 2011 Census, the proportion of residents in the Port Macquarie-Hastings local government area who stated their ancestry as Australian or Anglo-Celtic exceeded 83% of all residents (national average was 65.2%). In excess of 64% of all residents in the Port Macquarie-Hastings Council area nominated a religious affiliation with Christianity at the 2011 Census, which was higher than the national average of 50.2%. Meanwhile, as at the Census date, compared to the national average, households in the Port Macquarie-Hastings local government area had a significantly lower than average proportion (3.6%) where two or more languages are spoken (national average was 20.4%); and a significantly higher proportion (93.7%) where English only was spoken at home (national average was 76.8%).

Selected historical census data for Port Macquarie-Hastings local government area
Census year		2001	2006	2011	2016
Population	Estimated residents on census night	64,146	68,430	72,696	78,539
Population	LGA rank in terms of size within New South Wales			29th	▲28th
Population	% of New South Wales population			1.05%	1.05%
Population	% of Australian population	0.34%	0.34%	0.34%	0.34%
Cultural and language diversity					
Ancestry, top responses	English			33.4%	▼32.9%
Ancestry, top responses	Australian			32.8%	▼31.6%
Ancestry, top responses	Irish			9.5%	▲9.6%
Ancestry, top responses	Scottish			7.7%	▲7.9%
Ancestry, top responses	German			2.8%	▲2.9%
Language, top responses (other than English)	German	0.3%	0.3%	0.3%	▼0.2%
Language, top responses (other than English)	Spanish	n/c	n/c	▲0.1%	▲0.2%
Language, top responses (other than English)	French	0.1%	0.1%	0.1%	▲0.2%
Language, top responses (other than English)	Mandarin	n/c	n/c	n/c	▲0.2%
Language, top responses (other than English)	Italian	0.2%	0.2%	0.2%	0.2%
Religious affiliation					
Religious affiliation, top responses	No religion	11.5%	▲14.5%	▲18.1%	▲25.6%
Religious affiliation, top responses	Anglican	33.1%	▼31.3%	▼29.4%	▼24.6%
Religious affiliation, top responses	Catholic	24.2%	24.2%	▲24.7%	▼23.1%
Religious affiliation, top responses	Not stated	n/c	n/c	n/c	▲8.8%
Religious affiliation, top responses	Uniting Church	8.4%	▼7.2%	▼6.0%	▼4.8%
Median weekly incomes					
Personal income	Median weekly personal income		A$361	A$447	A$540
Personal income	% of Australian median income		77.5%	77.5%	81.6%
Family income	Median weekly family income		A$679	A$1,008	A$1,300
Family income	% of Australian median income		66.1%	68.1%	75.0%
Household income	Median weekly household income		A$891	A$837	A$1,042
Household income	% of Australian median income		76.1%	67.8%	72.5%

== Council ==
=== Current composition and election methods ===
Port Macquarie-Hastings Council is composed of nine councillors, including the mayor, for a fixed four-year term of office. The mayor is directly elected while the eight other councillors are elected proportionally as one entire ward. The most recent election was held on 14 September 2024, and the makeup of the council is as follows:

Party	Councillors
Team Roberts Independents	3
Team Sheppard Independents	2
Independent Liberal	1
Greens	1
Libertarian	1
Labor	1
Total	9 (including mayor)

Councillor	Party	Notes
Adam Roberts	Independent	Mayor; Team Roberts
Lauren Edwards	Greens	
Rachel Shepphard	Independent	Team Sheppard
Danielle Maltman	Independent	Team Roberts
Nik Lipovac	Independent Liberal	
Mark Hornshaw	Libertarian	
Chris Kirkman	Independent	Team Roberts
Lisa Intemann	Independent	Team Sheppard
Hamish Tubman	Labor	

== Election results ==
=== 2024 ===
2024 New South Wales local elections: Port Macquarie-Hastings
Party	Candidate	Votes	%	±%
Team Roberts	1. Adam Roberts; 2. Danielle Maltman (elected); 3. Chris Kirkman (elected); 4. Evan O'Brien; 5. Kylie Van Der Ley; 6. Josh Slade	15,343	28.0	−18.8 (Note: Compared with Team Pinson at the 2021 election.)
Team Sheppard	1. Rachel Sheppard (elected); 2. Lisa Intemann (elected); 3. Kingsley Searle; 4. Linda Elbourne	9,397	17.2	+1.9
Libertarian	1. Mark Hornshaw (elected); 2. Breelin Coetzer; 3. Duane Stace; 4. Deborah Cooper; 5. David Bird	8,763	16.0	+16.0
Team Lipovac	1. Nik Lipovac (elected); 2. Jon Bailey; 3. Ellen Crepaz; 4. Luke Garel	8,326	15.2	+6.8
Greens	1. Lauren Edwards (elected); 2. Stuart Watson; 3. Jane McIntyre; 4. Leslie Mitchell	7,668	14.0	+5.0
Labor	1. Hamish Tubman (elected); 2. Lorna Neal; 3. Reginald Millar; 4. Susan Baker	4,823	8.8	+8.8
Independent	DJ Apanui	401	0.7	+0.7
Total formal votes		54,721	91.8	
Informal votes		4,868	8.2	
Turnout		59,589	85.11	

=== 2021 ===
Elected councillor	Party
Adam Roberts	Team Pinson
Danielle Maltman	Team Pinson
Josh Slade	Team Pinson
Sharon Griffiths	Team Pinson
Lisa Intemann	Fighters
Rachel Sheppard	Sheppard Team
Lauren Edwards	Greens
Nik Lipovac	Hastings First

2021 New South Wales local elections: Port Macquarie-Hastings
Party	Candidate	Votes	%	±%
Team Pinson		24,571	46.8	
Fighters For Our Region		9,077	17.3	
The Sheppard Team for Sensible, Sustainable Progress		8,046	15.3	
Greens		4,704	9.0	
Hastings First		4,398	8.4	
Independent	Jon Bailey	1,721	3.3	
Total formal votes		52,517	92.3	
Informal votes		4,402	7.7	
Turnout		56,919	85.6	

== History ==
Local government in the Hastings region started with the passage of the District Councils Act 1842, which allowed for limited local government in the form of a warden and between 3 and 12 councillors to be appointed by the Governor. Between July and September 1843, 28 such entities had been proclaimed by Governor George Gipps. The Macquarie District Council, the 8th to be declared, was proclaimed on 12 August 1843, with a population of 2,409 and an area of 10,174 square kilometres (3,928 sq mi). Due to various factors, the district councils were ineffective, and most had ceased to operate by the end of the decade.

After the enactment of the Municipalities Act of 1858, which gave the councils more authority and which allowed for residents to petition for incorporation of areas and also to elect councillors, the town of Port Macquarie, population 984, petitioned to be incorporated as a municipality twice: in 1859 and again in 1867; but on both occasions, counter-petitions from other residents prevented it from being incorporated. Finally, on 15 March 1887, the Port Macquarie Municipal District was proclaimed, with the first elections on 25 May 1887 electing James McInherney as the first mayor.

The Local Government (Shires) Act 1905 enabled the Shire of Hastings, based in the town of Wauchope, to come into being in June 1906, in time for elections in November 1906. The first Shire President was James O'Neill.

In 1981, the two councils were amalgamated to form the Municipality of Hastings, with Norm Matesich becoming the council's inaugural mayor. In 1991, the council moved into its present premises in Burrawan Street, Port Macquarie. With the enactment of the Local Government Act 1993 (NSW), which changed the responsibilities of the mayor and councillors, the Hastings Council was created. In 2005, the name was changed to Port Macquarie-Hastings following a community survey, showing that many people thought that the new name would better reflect the area.

=== Glasshouse controversy ===
On 27 February 2008 the Minister for Local Government, Paul Lynch, dismissed the council and appointed an administrator, Dick Persson, who also administered the Northern Beaches Council and Warringah Council in Sydney, and the Central Coast Council in the Central Coast region. The dismissal of council was made after alleged mishandling of a project initiated in 2001 to build a cultural and entertainment centre, known to locals as the Glasshouse. The project, initially a joint venture with the management of the neighbouring shopping centre, Port Central, was initially expected to cost the Council A$7.3 million, but by late 2007, despite the centre not yet having opened, the costs had blown out to over A$41.7 million, with interest repayments likely to extend the council's liability to A$66 million. On 27 July 2007, a full public inquiry was announced by the Minister for Local Government, which reported back in February 2008.

The inquiry report found that the council had failed to provide appropriate financial and project management and had lost control of the costs, that the project costs had harmed the council's ability to provide services and amenities to the community, and that the council's "communications management strategies" had resulted in inadequate consultation with the public or appropriate regard to their concerns. The outgoing mayor, Rob Drew, was critical of the process throughout, maintaining that errors had been made and misinformation had been accepted as fact; however, the New South Wales Urban Task Force, a property development lobby group, believed the dismissal served as a warning to other councils to stick to "core responsibilities". In 2009 it was revealed that the Glasshouse would cost ratepayers around A$6 million a year to run.

== See also ==
- Local government in New South Wales
