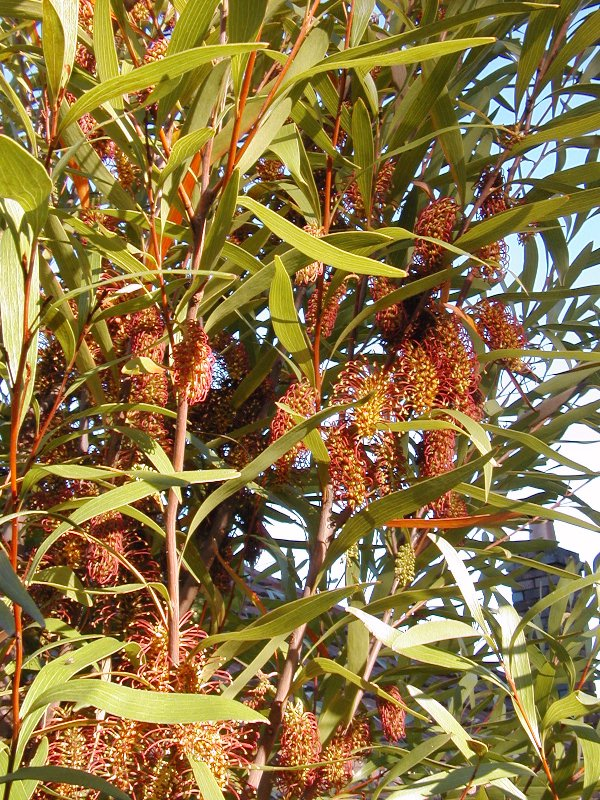

Conservation status
- Vulnerable (EPBC Act)

Scientific classification
- Kingdom: Plantae
- Clade: Tracheophytes
- Clade: Angiosperms
- Clade: Eudicots
- Order: Proteales
- Family: Proteaceae
- Genus: Hakea
- Species: H. archaeoides

Binomial name
- Hakea archaeoides W.R.Barker
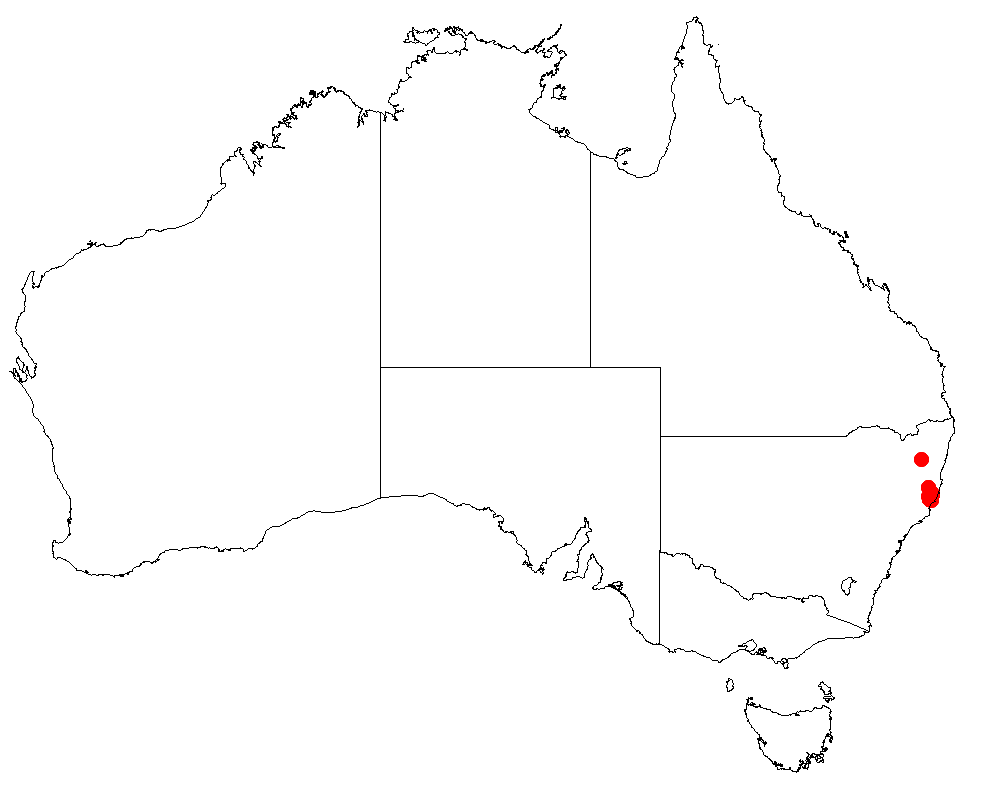
- Occurrence data from Australasian Virtual Herbarium

= Hakea archaeoides =

Species of plant endemic to eastern Australia

Hakea archaeoides is a large shrub or small tree commonly known as Big Nellie hakea and is endemic to forest areas on the north coast of New South Wales, Australia. It has clusters of red and greenish yellow flowers in the flowering season.

== Description ==
Hakea archaeoides is a lignotuberous multi-stemmed shrub growing up to 7 m (20 ft) in height and 4 m (10 ft) in width at maturity. Small branches and young leaves are densely covered in short red-brown silky hairs. The leaf stalk is 0.6–1.5 cm (0.2–0.6 in) long supporting a narrow oval shaped leaf 7.5–28.5 cm (3–10 in) long and 0.6–3 cm (0.2–1 in) wide gradually narrowing to a point 1–3 mm (0.04–0.1 in) long. The inflorescence has 70-110 or more flowers held on a stalk 40–7 mm (2–0.3 in) long generally with densely matted silky hairs. The individual flower stalks are 1.2–2 mm (0.05–0.08 in) long, hairless, reddening with age. The sepals and petals are green and smooth green glabrous or with scattered hairs in bud. The styles are red and 23–27 mm (0.9–1 in) long. Flowers are a red and greenish-yellow and appear in pendant axillary clusters in leaf axils from spring to early summer. The woody fruit are egg-shaped 1.5–2.2 cm (0.6–0.9 in) long and 1.2–1.4 cm (0.5–0.6 in) wide.

== Taxonomy and naming ==
Hakea archaeoides was first formally described in 1999 by William Barker and published in "Flora of Australia" from a specimen collected near Coopernook. The specific epithet (archaeoides) refers to this species' similarity to primitive hakeas as revealed in cladograms.

== Distribution and habitat ==
Hakea archaeoides is restricted to Taree and Wauchope areas in north-eastern New South Wales growing in wet sclerophyll forest and rainforest on hill slopes.

== Conservation ==
This hakea is listed as "vulnerable" under the Australian Government Environment Protection and Biodiversity Conservation Act 1999 and the New South Wales Biodiversity Conservation Act 2016.
