= Batar railway station =

Former railway station in New South Wales, Australia

Coordinates: 31°39′55″S 152°41′05″E

Batar was a railway station on the North Coast railway line on the North Coast of New South Wales, Australia. The station, named for the nearby Batar Creek, existed at the site between 1941 and 1971.

Preceding station	Former services	Following station
Kendall towards Brisbane	North Coast Line	Johns River towards Maitland
