= Macquarie County =

Macquarie New South Wales
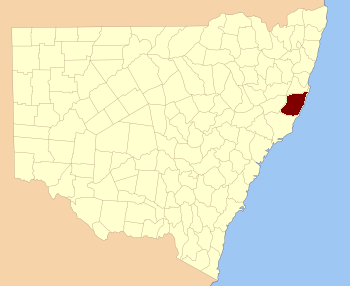
- Location in New South Wales
- Council seat: Port Macquarie
Lands administrative divisions around Macquarie:
Vernon	Dudley	Pacific Ocean
Hawes	Macquarie	Pacific Ocean
Gloucester	Gloucester	Pacific Ocean

Macquarie County is one of the 141 cadastral divisions of New South Wales, Australia. It is bordered to the north by the Apsley River, and to the south by the Manning River. It includes Port Macquarie and the area around it.

Macquarie County was named in honour of Governor Lachlan Macquarie (1762–1824).

== Parishes within this county ==
A full list of parishes found within this county; their current LGA and mapping coordinates to the approximate centre of each location is as follows:

Parish	LGA	Coordinates
Albert	Port Macquarie-Hastings Council	31°20′54″S 152°30′04″E
Arakoon	Kempsey Shire	30°55′54″S 153°04′04″E
Ballengarra	Port Macquarie-Hastings Council	31°15′54″S 152°45′04″E
Barnard	Mid-Coast Council	31°36′54″S 152°07′04″E
Bellangry	Port Macquarie-Hastings Council	31°17′54″S 152°28′04″E
Beranghi	Kempsey Shire	31°08′54″S 152°55′04″E
Bobin	Mid-Coast Council	31°44′54″S 152°15′04″E
Bulga	Mid-Coast Council	31°36′54″S 152°17′04″E
Burrawan	Port Macquarie-Hastings Council	31°29′54″S 152°46′04″E
Burrawan	Port Macquarie-Hastings Council	31°30′54″S 152°47′04″E
Cairncross	Port Macquarie-Hastings Council	31°20′54″S 152°44′04″E
Camden Haven	Port Macquarie-Hastings Council	31°37′54″S 152°44′04″E
Cogo	Port Macquarie-Hastings Council	31°17′54″S 152°38′04″E
Comboyne	Port Macquarie-Hastings Council	31°37′54″S 152°30′04″E
Cowangara	Port Macquarie-Hastings Council	31°29′54″S 152°29′04″E
Cowangara	Port Macquarie-Hastings Council	31°29′54″S 152°30′04″E
Cundle	Mid-Coast Council	31°50′54″S 152°33′04″E
Dawson	Mid-Coast Council	31°46′54″S 152°25′04″E
Dawson	Mid-Coast Council	31°47′54″S 152°28′04″E
Debenham	Port Macquarie-Hastings Council	31°29′54″S 152°15′04″E
Ellenborough	Port Macquarie-Hastings Council	31°29′54″S 152°23′04″E
Forbes	Port Macquarie-Hastings Council	31°16′54″S 152°23′04″E
Graeme	Port Macquarie-Hastings Council	31°26′54″S 152°08′04″E
Harrington	Mid-Coast Council	31°49′54″S 152°41′04″E
Innes	Port Macquarie-Hastings Council	31°32′54″S 152°24′04″E
Jasper	Port Macquarie-Hastings Council	31°20′54″S 152°17′04″E
Johns River	Mid-Coast Council	31°40′54″S 152°42′04″E
Kempsey	Kempsey Shire	31°03′54″S 152°55′04″E
Kerewong	Port Macquarie-Hastings Council	31°37′54″S 152°23′04″E
Khatambuhl	Mid-Coast Council	31°46′54″S 151°58′04″E
Killawarra	Mid-Coast Council	31°53′54″S 152°17′04″E
Kinchela	Kempsey Shire	31°02′54″S 153°00′04″E
Kindee	Port Macquarie-Hastings Council	31°20′54″S 152°23′04″E
Kippara	Port Macquarie-Hastings Council	31°11′54″S 152°29′04″E
Knorrit	Mid-Coast Council	31°48′54″S 152°07′04″E
Kokomerican	Mid-Coast Council	31°32′54″S 152°08′04″E
Koree	Port Macquarie-Hastings Council	31°27′54″S 152°43′04″E
Koree	Port Macquarie-Hastings Council	31°28′54″S 152°40′04″E
Lansdowne	Mid-Coast Council	31°44′54″S 152°34′04″E
Lewis	Mid-Coast Council	31°49′54″S 152°12′04″E
Lincoln	Kempsey Shire	31°12′54″S 152°52′04″E
Lorne	Mid-Coast Council	31°36′54″S 152°35′04″E
Mackay	Mid-Coast Council	31°39′54″S 152°01′04″E
Port Macquarie	Port Macquarie-Hastings Council	31°26′54″S 152°50′04″E
Marlee	Mid-Coast Council	31°44′54″S 152°21′04″E
Marsh	Mid-Coast Council	31°41′54″S 152°21′04″E
Moorabark	Port Macquarie-Hastings Council	31°14′54″S 152°16′04″E
Morton	Port Macquarie-Hastings Council	31°11′54″S 152°25′04″E
Myall	Mid-Coast Council	31°34′54″S 152°15′04″E
Oxley	Mid-Coast Council	31°54′54″S 152°35′04″E
Palmerston	Kempsey Shire	31°14′54″S 152°55′04″E
Pappinbarra	Port Macquarie-Hastings Council	31°23′54″S 152°36′04″E
Prospect	Port Macquarie-Hastings Council	31°16′54″S 152°49′04″E
Queens Lake	Port Macquarie-Hastings Council	31°33′54″S 152°48′04″E
Ralfe	Port Macquarie-Hastings Council	31°33′54″S 152°42′04″E
Redbank	Port Macquarie-Hastings Council	31°24′54″S 152°44′04″E
Rowley	Mid-Coast Council	31°41′54″S 152°07′04″E
Stewart	Mid-Coast Council	31°44′54″S 152°42′04″E
Taree	Mid-Coast Council	31°51′54″S 152°41′04″E
Tinebank	Port Macquarie-Hastings Council	31°12′54″S 152°40′04″E
Torrens	Port Macquarie-Hastings Council	31°19′15″S 152°54′27″E
Vernon	Walcha Shire	31°08′54″S 152°15′04″E
Walibree	Port Macquarie-Hastings Council	31°32′54″S 152°32′04″E
Walibree	Port Macquarie-Hastings Council	31°33′54″S 152°30′04″E
Wingham	Mid-Coast Council	31°50′54″S 152°21′04″E
Wyoming	Mid-Coast Council	31°50′54″S 152°11′04″E
Yarratt	Mid-Coast Council	31°42′54″S 152°23′04″E
