= Pipers Creek Lime Kilns =

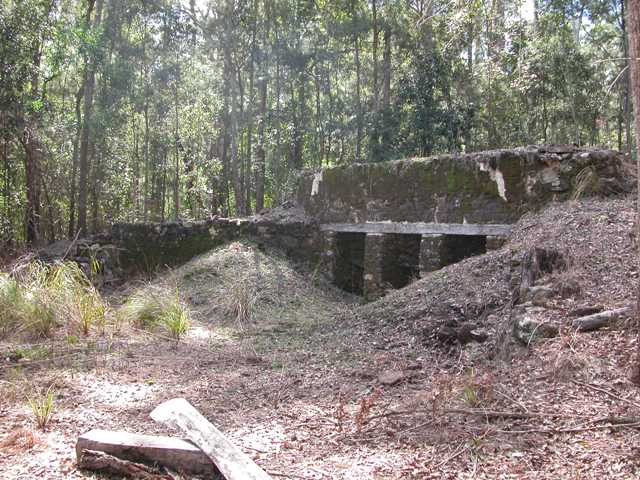
- Lime kiln "I"

- Location within New South Wales Location within Australia
- 31.1853°S 152.7472°E
- Location: Bonnie Corner Road, Dondingalong, Kumbatine National Park, New South Wales, Australia

History
- Built: 1832–1840

Site notes
- Owner: Office of Environment and Heritage

New South Wales Heritage Register
- Official name: Pipers Creek Lime Kilns; Bonnie Corner Lime Kilns; Industrial Archaeological Site; Smith's Creek Lime Station
- Type: state heritage (archaeological-terrestrial)
- Designated: 22 March 2011
- Reference no.: 1856
- Type: Kiln Lime
- Category: Manufacturing and Processing
- Builders: probably convicts

The Pipers Creek Lime Kilns are heritage-listed former lime kilns at Bonnie Corner Road, Dondingalong in the Kumbatine National Park, New South Wales, Australia. It was built from 1832 to 1840, probably by convicts. It is also known as Bonnie Corner Lime Kilns and Smith's Creek Lime Station. The property is owned by the New South Wales Office of Environment and Heritage. It was added to the New South Wales State Heritage Register on 22 March 2011.

== History ==
The Pipers Creek Lime Kilns are located in Dunghutti country (also known in some areas as Thunghutti). Food was plentiful in the Macleay Valley and indigenous people moved between the upper Macleay and the floor of the valley during winter to escape some of the cooler areas found in the valley. The area around the lime kilns was used for general activities such as seasonal hunting.

The first sighting of land within the Kempsey Shire by Europeans was recorded by Captain James Cook in 1770. The region was seen again in the 1810s when Europeans landed four kilometres north of Smoky Cape. In 1820 John Oxley and Captain Allman were sent to survey Port Macquarie and report on its suitability as a new settlement for convicts. Oxley was directed to examine inlets north of Smoky Cape. He travelled a short way up the Macleay River, but not far enough to view the more favourable lands pass the initial swamps, marshes, sandy infertile soils and hilly forest country preceding the valley.

Limestone was first discovered in NSW on the Belubula River in 1815. Early use of limestone for the production of mortar occurred in the Bathurst area and on the Shoalhaven River, Macleay River and Manning River where deposits were close to expanding settlements. Major centres for the industry developed at Kingsdale near Goulburn and Portland near Lithgow in the late nineteenth century. There are over 400 separate occurrences of limestone in NSW. Although widespread, there is a concentration of sites in the eastern part of the state due to tectonic activity conducive to the development of limestone. Notable occurrences are between Portland and Mudgee, Marulan, Goulburn, Yass, Queanbeyan, Cooma, Molong, Orange, Cumnock, Blayney, Tamworth Attunga/Manilla, Gloucester, Taree, Kempsey and Gundagai.

Port Macquarie was settled as a penal station in April 1821. The main reason for the establishment of the settlement was to provide a "place of banishment" at some distance from Sydney. Newcastle, used at that time as a place of secondary punishment, had lost some of its appeal as increasing numbers of convicts escaped with relative ease and returned to Sydney. The rich timber resources of the Hastings River district, described by Oxley on his exploratory investigation in 1818 and King and Oxley in 1819, was another attraction. In addition Governor Lachlan Macquarie, with more convicts on his hands than he could usefully employ, considered that the surplus labour force could be absorbed in road construction and building projects in a new settlement.

The first buildings constructed by the white settlers at Port Macquarie were made of tea-tree branches, bark and long grass. These were soon replaced by weatherboard buildings. By the end of October 1821 buildings and huts capable of housing 400 prisoners and soldiers had been erected. As the settlement progressed the buildings became more solidly built, permanent structures. Clay bricks were manufactured. Pipeclay suitable for moulding sandstock bricks was used and lime for mortar obtained from burning oyster shells (Aboriginal middens?) found in the harbour, Limeburners Creek and south at Camden Haven. By 1825 with work progressing on the building of St Thomas' Church and other public buildings, large quantities of lime were needed. In addition exports of lime for the insatiable Sydney building industry soon created a shortage. It is not surprising therefore that the depletion of the lime source at Camden Haven was reported in that year. There was a temporary respite, however, when in 1826 a new Camden Haven bank of lime was discovered.

The first reference to the Pipers Creek limestone deposits was made in November 1831 when Surveyor James Ralfe reported finding a deposit of "superior quality" limestone six miles from the head of Pipers Creek. Ralfe and his surveyors had first come to the district in the late 1820s to survey land that prospective settlers wished to buy. This was the result of a decision, made in 1829, to open up the area to free settlers and close down the convict establishment. In July 1830 a proclamation by Governor Ralph Darling made this official.

Ralfe's work entailed journeys of exploration as well as surveying. In May 1830 he reported to the Surveyor General that he had followed Pipers Creek and "traced a little beyond the extent of its navigation". The limestone deposits, located further upstream, were not to be discovered until the following year. They are marked on Ralfe's 1833 map of the district. Although the upper reaches of Pipers Creek had still not been surveyed at this stage, the deposits were on the route of the proposed road to the New (Macleay) River.

It is not known exactly when the limestone at Pipers Creek was first quarried. Secondary sources date this from the well known 1832 exchange of letters between the Colonial Secretary and the first resident magistrate stationed at Port Macquarie, Benjamin Sullivan. On 30 July 1832 Sullivan wrote:

"I having been informed that shells for the purpose of making lime for the use of this settlement have got to be very scarce, I beg leave to suggest the propriety of working the stone lime near Pipers Creek should such a measure meet with His Excellency the Governor's approbation it will from the distance that point is from the Settlement, be necessary to appoint a paid Overseer to superintend the work; the advantages of stone over shell lime I need not point out, and after the kilns are once established the expense will be trifling while the Government will be able to have constant supplies of Roach Lime transmitted to Sydney not only for the public service but also for sale to the public".(Letter to Col. Sec. 30 July 1832 (4/2152 SRNSW)

Permission for convict labour to be used for lime burning was given, provided that no "additional expense was incurred" and that the lime be handed over to the Commissariat.

Secondary sources, on the basis of this evidence, date the construction of the limekilns from the early 1830s. Lime was undoubtedly scarce, so it may be that no time was lost in exploiting a valuable resource. Ralfe, as well as Sullivan, had noted this shortage. In April 1832 Charles Farrell, a publican and the proprietor of the Settlers' Arms, in Horton Street, Port Macquarie had asked Ralfe to survey the western bank of Limeburners Creek, north of the town. In a letter to the Surveyor General, Ralfe commented that this area had "hitherto been used by the Government for the purpose of burning the shells there found into lime". He added that he did not "consider it of sufficient importance to reserve for that purpose". This seems to indicate that this area was no longer used for lime burning. More extensive research is needed, however, to ascertain exactly when the Camden Haven deposits were exhausted.

The pressing need to find other sources of lime for building purposes remained. In September 1832 in a Return of Mechanics at Port Macquarie by Magistrate Benjamin Sullivan noted that "I would propose forwarding 1000 bushels of lime, the shells being exhausted and the quality of the Roach lime, which it is stated can be obtained from Pipers Creek, is as yet uncertain." In the same month he authorised an order that men be employed under Special Constable Edward James Gray in procuring stone lime and not be removed from that activity except by further orders.

It is not possible to say exactly when this limestone of "uncertain" quality was first used locally. Although a return of convict employment records that convicts were involved in lime burning in 1833, they could easily have been burning the last of the oyster shells for lime. Limestone from the district certainly does not seem to have been sent to Sydney in any quantity until the 1840s.

Early evidence that the limestone deposits were being worked is seen in an 1840 map on which a limestone quarry, just south of Pipers Creek, is marked. The track from the quarry, marked clearly on subsequent parish and county maps, (for example, the 1872 County Macquarie map) can be faintly discerned on this map. (The adjoining land grant dates from 1831, the year of Ralfe's discovery of the deposit.)

There is a reference in the Australian in September 1842 to "Port Macquarie Stone Lime", known by builders as "roach lime". This "desirable article" was said to be arriving "by large and continuous supplies from Port Macquarie". The article continued:

"Although this lime has been for some time favourably known to us, yet the difficulties in the way of its transmission from the works on the Wilson, have hitherto prevented its general adoption by the trade in Sydney."

This reference to the Wilson River is confusing. It can probably be explained by the fact that as the article was for a Sydney newspaper, reference was made, for ease of identification, to the best known large river in the vicinity. There is another deposit of limestone in the district at Koree Island but as this is on the Hastings River, it is obviously not the deposit to which this account refers.

In October 1842, The Australian reported that the shipments of lime were now on a "permanent footing". In March 1843 Richard Thompson placed an advertisement in the Sydney Morning Herald to let "architects, builders and the Trade" know that he had concluded "extensive arrangements" at Port Macquarie "for the production of Roach Lime to an extent proportioned to the increasing demand for it in Sydney". The advertisement claimed that he was prepared to deliver it in "any quantity".

According to the account of New South Wales government geologists Carne and Jones, written in 1919, the limestone was burnt near the quarry site and the lime was carted to Smith's Creek, then shipped down the Maria River to Port Macquarie. They remarked that portions of the old kiln are still standing. They were well constructed of massive sandstone, rectangular in shape, 18 feet (5.4 metres) long, 10 feet (3 metres) wide and 12 feet (3.6 metres) deep with three fire-boxes.

Carne and Jones were in communication with Thomas Dick (1877-1927) of Port Macquarie who is best remembered for his evocative photographs of Hastings River Aborigines. Dick was an oyster culturist who had regular contact with members of Sydney's scientific community such as T.C. Roughley, an expert on coastal fish species. His grandfather, John Dick, had settled in Port Macquarie in 1841 - six years before the end of the convict establishment. Thomas Dick wrote extensively on the local history of the area and recounted stories that his father had told him. Carne and Jones seem to have gleaned the story of the convict origin of the limekilns from Dick.

Sources local to the area have described the process of lime burning as a fire being set in the pit with wood and the hand quarried limestone blocks being dropped in from above. The lime apparently fell to the bottom of the pit and was removed by scraping it out the front through the openings. The kilns are suggested to have been operated by men rotating from one kiln to the next for each task. Convict workers are suggested to have been housed in wooden dwellings near the limestone quarrying area. Other facilities were also believed to be constructed nearby, including a cookhouse. However, it is inconclusive whether convicts built the Pipers Creek lime kilns.

The land on which the kilns are located was a government reserve from as early as 1836, while private individuals were given permission to get lime from the reserve from at least 1837. A Dr Fattorini is known to have built lime kilns at Piper's Creek by 1837-38. By 1841 both convicts /government gangs and private individuals were working the lime. Kilns in the area continued to be used whenever lime for building works was needed at Port Macquarie until at least the 1880s.

In 1885 P. Cohen & Co. applied for the area south of Pipers Creek where the limekilns are located for "quarry purposes".

Local sources suggest that the kilns were reworked on a subsistence basis during the Depression of the 1930s.

The site underwent conservation works to Kilns I, J and K in 2006.

Early kiln designs and comparisons

The lime kilns at Piper's Creek have been described as unusual for their type, and a modification of the intermittent kiln known as the D Kiln, in that they are built into a bank with a stone front wall penetrated by three fire boxes/draw holes. The most unusual feature is the extremely narrow burning chamber. The origin of the style is not known but it has been suggested that it may simply be a response to local conditions such as the scarcity of long handled iron tools needed to operate a full-width kiln. D Kilns are so described because of their shape like a letter D in plan form. They have been dug into the face of a bank with a vertical masonry wall built across the front of the pit to create a firing chamber. D kilns had become the commonest type of kiln found in NSW in the late nineteenth and early twentieth centuries. Other common forms of kilns found in Australia were the bottle kiln and the inverted bell shaped kiln. Each type was used in both commercial and private kiln production. The oldest of the surviving early kilns in Australia is located on Norfolk Island where part of an 1802 kiln exists, while an 1845 kiln is in excellent condition. The 1845 kiln is an inverted bell type as are 1840s Kilns found in Port Arthur, Tasmania and St Helena's Island in Moreton Bay Queensland (1860s). Three kilns are located at a settlement previously known as Port Essington in the Northern Territory. These bottle shaped kilns were constructed between 1838 and 1849. Most of the surviving D Kilns were constructed late in the nineteenth century including Kingsdale near Goulburn (1880s) Other lime kilns are known to be extant up on the Maria River near the Pipers Creek Kilns but are believed to be not in as good condition. There is also a kiln at Cliefden in the Blayney/Cowra region.

== Description ==
The Pipers Creek lime kilns are located within Kumbatine National Park (formerly Maria River State Forest) approximately 12 km south of Kempsey and west of the Pacific Highway. They are only accessible via fire trails and then on foot. The sites are generally isolated with bushes, grasses, small trees and other undergrowth encroaching on them. Although the kilns themselves are clearly visible due to recent work and maintenance, associated worksites and building footings are now generally overgrown and almost invisible to the casual observer.

The lime kilns are built into the side of hills next to the limestone resource and near associated structures. They are constructed of rough rubble stone with lime-mortar as bonding. The kilns were originally covered with render which is now exfoliating.

Lime Kiln "I"

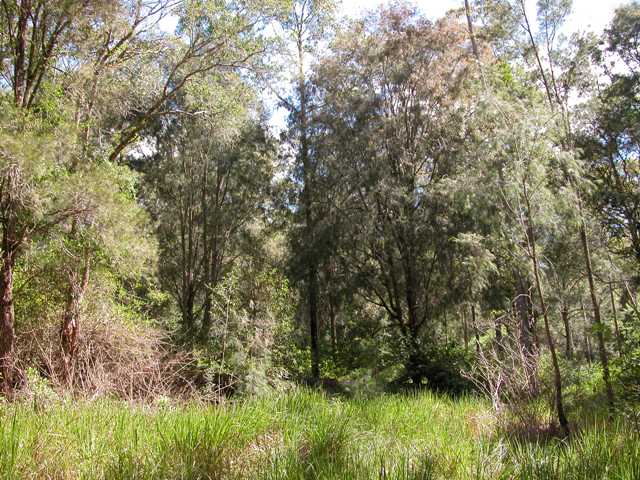
Approximate location of cook house remains and general view of vegetation in the vicinity of Kiln "I"

This kiln is located north of Bonnie Corner Road. It is accessed via an unformed track through the gently sloping landscape. The areas immediately beside the track are relatively clear of trees, giving way to moderately treed areas beyond. These areas between the track and the trees beyond contain a variety of now overgrown features which are believed to be associated with the lime kilns, including:

- the remains of a brick structure thought to be the guardhouse (including brick footings);
- rough stones set in lime mortar on a raised impression;
- treeless grassy area;
- shallow depressions thought to be exploratory digs for limestone;
- large water-filled circular depressions;
- tumbled remains of rough stone walls thought to be the cookhouse;
- pile of rubble, gravel, small stones 30m from kiln I;

These features are not easily recognisable and many could easily by mistaken for natural features. The remains of buildings are limited and overgrown and could not be assessed in the future without removal of overgrowth.

The kiln itself is located within a clearing. On entering the clearing a large interpretive sign provides basic information about the kiln. Several mounds appear to consist of materials associated with the lime burning. Small stones are scattered throughout the site while grasses and saplings have begun to encroach, particularly at the edges of the clearing. The kiln is located beyond the sign and is a large rectangular structure built into the hill of approximately 8m long x 3.6m wide x 2.4m high. This construction style allowed a flue to be formed. It is constructed of a rough rubble stone kiln with a lime based mortar used for bedding. There is evidence of a render which is now exfoliating. Wing walls at either end of the kiln act as retaining walls in the hillside to create a level construction and working surface in front of the firing chamber. What appear to be large spoil and debris mounds are piled against the walls. The fire holes in the front of the kiln consist of 3 rectangular openings approximately 5.5 metres long by 1.7 metres wide with a recently replaced ironbark lintel over the top to support the wall above. The old lintel is located on the hill behind the kiln. The burning chamber is unusually narrow (approx 5.5m long and 1.7m wide) with an open top. Stones located in the fire chamber are likely to be associated with the lime burning activity or to have dislodged from the structure. The kiln's construction into the hillside allow lime and fuel to be carried up the hill and dropped through the open top into the chamber. Evidence of mortar inside chamber suggests that it was probably originally lined with mortar. Repointing of some surfaces within the chamber with a soft lime mortar has taken place during recent conservation works.

The presence of a lot of stone on the hill to the rear of the kiln is likely to be limestone brought up the hill to be used in the kiln. Weeds have grown in the crevices and over the stones of the kiln but are subject to periodic maintenance.

A consolidated lime block approximately 1 metre high is located to one side of the kiln, at a distance of approximately 20 metres from the kiln. Although covered with leaf litter and moss and appearing to have partially deteriorated, it is clearly a substantial item in the clearing.

Lime Kiln "J"

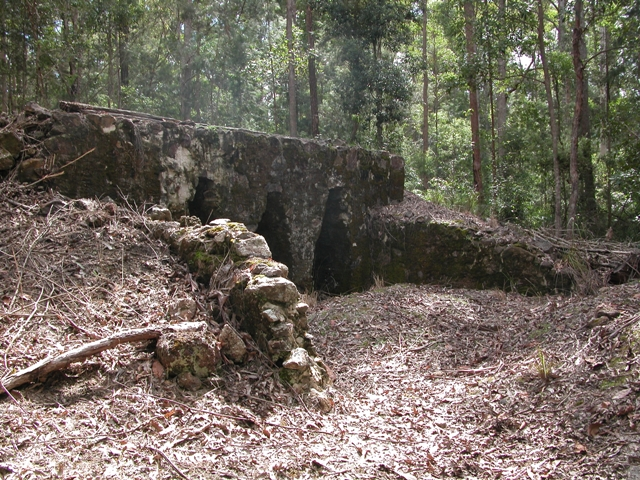
Kiln "J"

Like kilns I and K, Kiln J is located in a clearing accessed by an unformed track. The clearing is located within a moderately treed area It is built into a hill and is approximately 8m long x 3.6m wide x 2.4m high with wing walls at the front retaining the hill to create a level construction and working surface in front of the burning chamber. It is constructed of a rough rubble stone with a lime based mortar used for bedding. There is evidence of a render which is now exfoliating. Like the nearby kilns, the burning chamber is unusually narrow (approx 5.5m long and 1.7m wide) and open at the top to allow lime and fuel to be gravity fed. Evidence of mortar inside the chamber suggests that it was probably originally lined with mortar. Repointing of some surfaces within the chamber with a soft lime mortar has taken place during recent conservation works. This kiln differs to kilns I and K in that it has double stone lintels over the three fire draw holes rather than a timber lintel. The fire holes themselves are of an arched, almost bottle like shape. The stonework appears to be more refined in its construction. Some regrowth of weeds and other plants has begun to occur but will be controlled with regular maintenance.

Several mounds of lime and limestone are located in front of the kiln.

Lime Kiln "K"

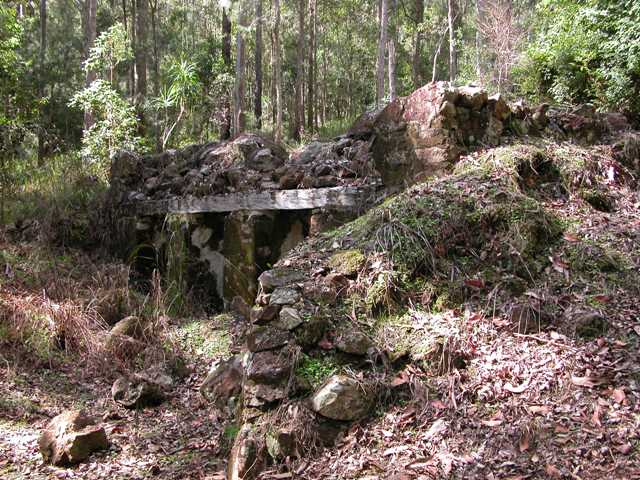
Lime Kiln "K"

This D kiln is located in a small clearing off the rough, unformed track known as Convict Road. Similar in design to kilns I and J, it is also constructed into the side of a hill and is approximately 8m long x 3.6m wide x 2.4m high with wing walls at the front retaining the hill to create a level construction and working surface in front of the burning chamber. It is constructed of a rough rubble stone with a lime based mortar used for bedding. However, the throat of the fire holes is constructed of flags rather than rubble stone. There is evidence of a render which is now exfoliating. Like the nearby kilns, the burning chamber is unusually narrow (approx 5.5m long and 1.7m wide) and open at the top to allow lime and fuel to be gravity fed from the hill above. A brush box timber lintel over the three rectangular fire holes is a more recent replacement of a previous lintel. Again there is evidence of weed growth which will be subject to periodic maintenance.

A large 1 metre high mound of lime is located at the northern corner and in front of the kiln.

A fourth kiln, Lime Kiln "L" was described in 2003 as located west of kiln J, cut into the bank of Pipers Creek. There is no archaeological description of this kiln available and it is unclear whether it still exists. Mention of its existence is extremely limited. It has previously been described as having two fire box/draw hole openings covered by silt from creek flooding. The front wall was a very thin structure of hand fitted rock. When last sighted it was in a poor state of repair and threatened by nearby trees.

=== Condition ===
As at 9 March 2010, the recent work on Kilns I, J and K had stabilised the structures using conservation and traditional trade techniques, which had returned them to a condition where the visiting public can now understand them. The remaining items have not had works undertaken on them and their hidden nature makes them difficult to access.

The variety of the archaeological resource suggests that the potential to demonstrate the layout and workings of the site is likely to be high.

== Heritage listing ==
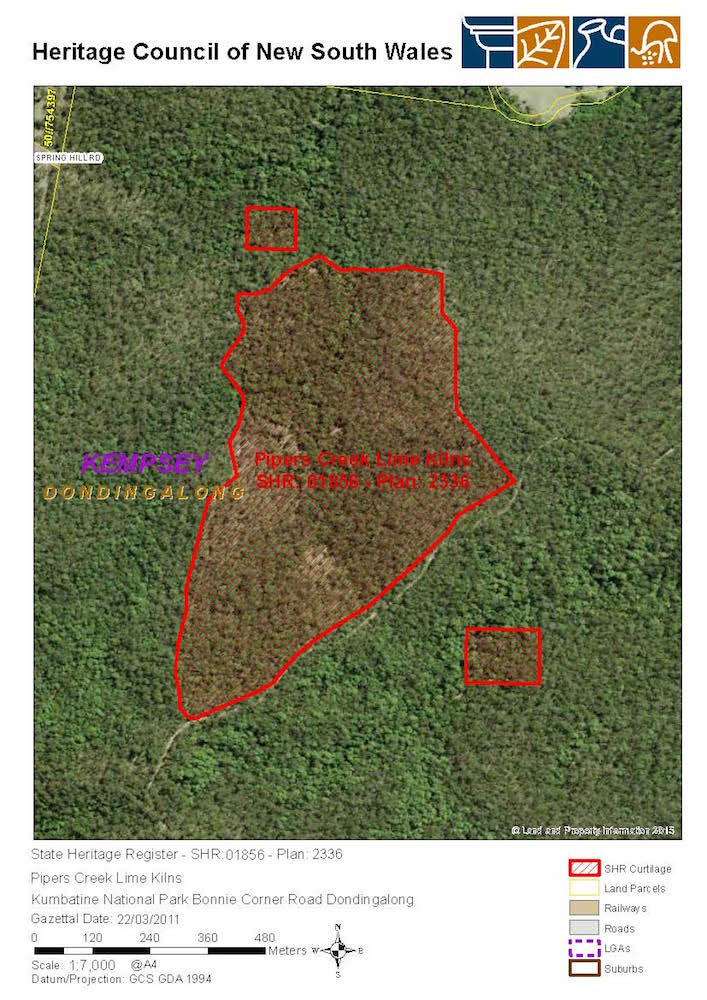
Heritage boundaries

The Pipers Creek Lime Kilns have state significance as an important example of only a few extant early-mid nineteenth century period lime kilns in NSW. They are also highly likely to be a unique variation of their type. The quality of the extant fabric together with the history of the kilns' contribution to lime production in early and mid nineteenth century New South Wales make them an important physical reminder of an industrial process that was crucial to the ongoing construction of permanent buildings in Port Macquarie, and the colony more generally.

Pipers Creek Lime Kilns was listed on the New South Wales State Heritage Register on 22 March 2011 having satisfied the following criteria.

The place is important in demonstrating the course, or pattern, of cultural or natural history in New South Wales.

The Pipers Creek Lime kilns have state and local significance as an example of early to mid nineteenth century lime kilns in NSW. The construction of the kilns also have local and state historical significance as an industrial site developed as a direct result of a growing demand for lime to cater for the increasing construction of permanent brick structures in Port Macquarie from 1825, and general building works in Sydney and the broader colony. The kilns contributed to increased local lime production from 1840 in response to even greater demand for the product, and a depletion of previously used lime resources such as shell. The kilns' ongoing operation, despite the harsh environment which they were located in and their distance from substantial transport networks, are a clear suggestion of a lack of sizeable or suitable lime resources in more accessible and easily worked areas of the district or the state.

The place is important in demonstrating aesthetic characteristics and/or a high degree of creative or technical achievement in New South Wales.

The Piper's Creek Limekilns have state technical significance as an unusual, and perhaps unique variation in NSW of the traditional D-shape intermittent lime kiln in that they are built into a bank rather than being freestanding. The limekilns also have technical significance in that they demonstrate the methods of lime burning in the 1830s in NSW and can be compared with other contemporary lime kilns such as Port Arthur, Goat Island and Norfolk Island. Their location and distance from the Maria River are a reminder of the harsh conditions faced by those working the kilns and relocating the lime for transport.

The place has potential to yield information that will contribute to an understanding of the cultural or natural history of New South Wales.

The Piper's Creek Lime kilns have state research significance as an example of an early use of D shape lime kilns in NSW, and the manner in which this style could be adapted for use to suit varying local conditions or the availability of necessary tools or materials. They demonstrate changes in construction techniques with their slight variations in design.

The place possesses uncommon, rare or endangered aspects of the cultural or natural history of New South Wales.

The kilns have rarity value at a state level due to the small number of lime kilns in existence in NSW from the early to mid nineteenth century and the seemingly unique variation on D-shaped kilns these represent.

The place is important in demonstrating the principal characteristics of a class of cultural or natural places/environments in New South Wales.

The Pipers Creek Lime Kilns are representative of an early version of a class of limekilns that became prevalent in NSW in the late nineteenth and early twentieth centuries.
