= Maria River (Australia) =

Coordinates: 31°09′S 152°50′E

Maria River Maria River South Branch, Scrubby Creek

Location
- Country: Australia
- State: New South Wales
- IBRA: NSW North Coast
- District: Mid North Coast
- local government area: Port Macquarie-Hastings

Physical characteristics
- Source: Eastern slopes in Kumbatine National Park
  - location: near the village of Kundabung, west of Crescent Head
  - elevation: 131 m (430 ft)
- Mouth: confluence with the Hastings River
  - location: west of Port Macquarie
  - elevation: 0 m (0 ft)
- Length: 62 km (39 mi)

Basin features
- River system: Hastings River catchment
- Tributaries
  - right: Wilson River, Pipers Creek
- National Park: Kumbatine National Park

Maria River, a watercourse of the Hastings River catchment, is located in the Mid North Coast region of New South Wales, Australia.

== Course and features ==
Maria River rises on the eastern slopes located in Kumbatine National Park, near the village of Kundabung, west of Crescent Head, and flows generally east, south southeast, and then southwest, joined by two tributaries including the Wilson River, before reaching its confluence with the Hastings River, west of Port Macquarie. The river descends 132 metres (433 ft) over its 62 kilometres (39 mi) course.

== See also ==
- Rivers of New South Wales
- List of rivers of New South Wales (A–K)
- List of rivers of Australia
