= Glencoe Creek =

River in New South Wales, Australia

Coordinates: 31°13′56″S 152°37′54″E

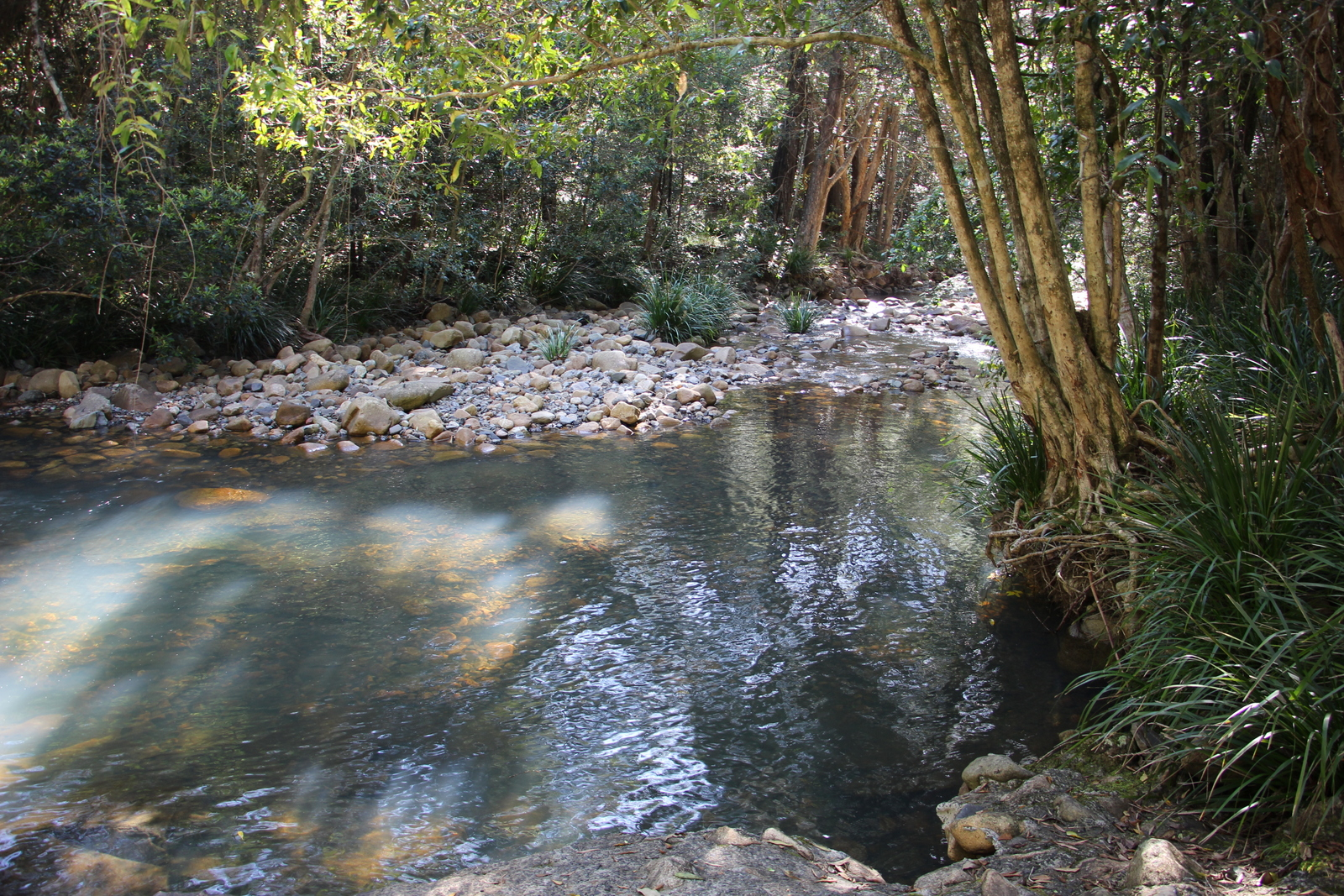
Glencoe Creek, also known as Marowin Brook

Glencoe Creek, also known as Marowin Brook, is a creek in Upper Rollands Plains, New South Wales, Australia. It is located in the Port Macquarie-Hastings Council area in the Mid North Coast region of New South Wales.

Glencoe Creek starts below Tinebank Mountain at an elevation of 900 metres (3,000 ft) and flows into the Wilson River, ending at an elevation of 44.7 metres (147 ft). The area is covered in blackbutt and tallowwood trees some 80 meters in height, and is located mostly within Kumbatine National Park.

The climate is subtropical.
