= Tonyosynthemis ofarrelli =

Slender tigertail

Conservation status
- Near Threatened (IUCN 3.1)

Scientific classification
- Kingdom: Animalia
- Phylum: Arthropoda
- Clade: Pancrustacea
- Class: Insecta
- Order: Odonata
- Suborder: Anisoptera
- Superfamily: Libelluloidea
- Family: Synthemistidae
- Genus: Tonyosynthemis
- Species: T. ofarrelli

Binomial name
- Tonyosynthemis ofarrelli (Theischinger & Watson, 1986)

Synonyms
- Synthemis ofarrelli Theischinger & Watson, 1986

Species of dragonfly

Tonyosynthemis ofarrelli, more commonly known as the slender tigertail, is a species of Odonata from the family Synthemistidae. It is found in Queensland, Australia, along the eastern coast. They tend to live along or near freshwater streams or rivers, which is also where Odonata tend to lay their eggs.

== Life ==
As an adult, Tonyosynthemis ofarrelli is a predator, feeding on smaller dragonflies and larvae. Females lay their eggs along streams. Samples of larvae and exuviae were collected at multiple sites in the 1990s in north-eastern New South Wales, Australia. The sites consisted of the Timbara River near Billyrimba, the Boonoo Boonoo Falls, and at Wild Bull Park along the Wilson River, also nicknamed "The Bluff". Researchers successfully collected first-instar exuviae and a specimen of a female along the Wilson River, which matches the description from an earlier specimen of a confirmed male Tonyosynthemis ofarrelli, so scientists have concluded that the female specimen collected is that of Tonyosynthemis ofarrelli.

== Female specimen ==
The collected female specimen's hindwing was about 34.2 millimetres (1.35 in), with an abdomen measuring about 36.5 mm (1.44 in). The female's head was dark brown in colour, with a small yellow spot below its eyes. Its wings were lacking the male's yellow median ray, but did include a membrane based at the bottom of the wings that was dirty yellow in colour. The specimen's abdomen was slightly compressed, and a section of its tergum was without a yellow dorsal spot, although the rest of its tergum did include various dorsal patches.

== Etymology ==
In 1998, Günther Theischinger named the genus Tonyosynthemis in honour of two friends and fellow odonatologists, the late Tony Watson (1935–1993) and the late A. F. (Tony) O'Farrell (1917–1997). The genus name combines the name "Tony" with the existing genus name Synthemis.

In 1986, Günther Theischinger and Tony Watson named this species ofarrelli, an eponym honouring A. F. (Tony) O'Farrell in recognition of his contributions to the knowledge of Australian Odonata.

== Gallery ==
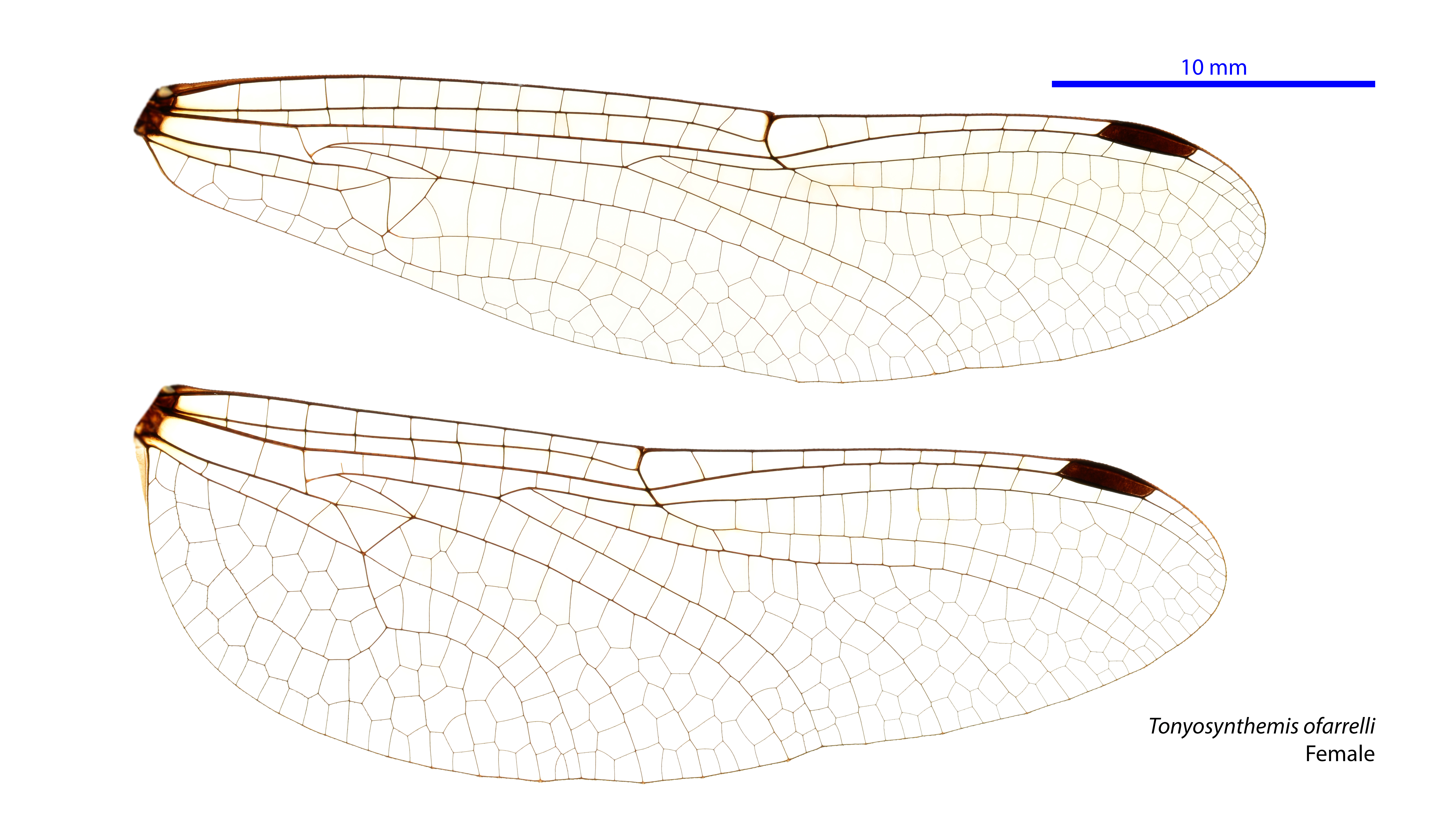
Female wings

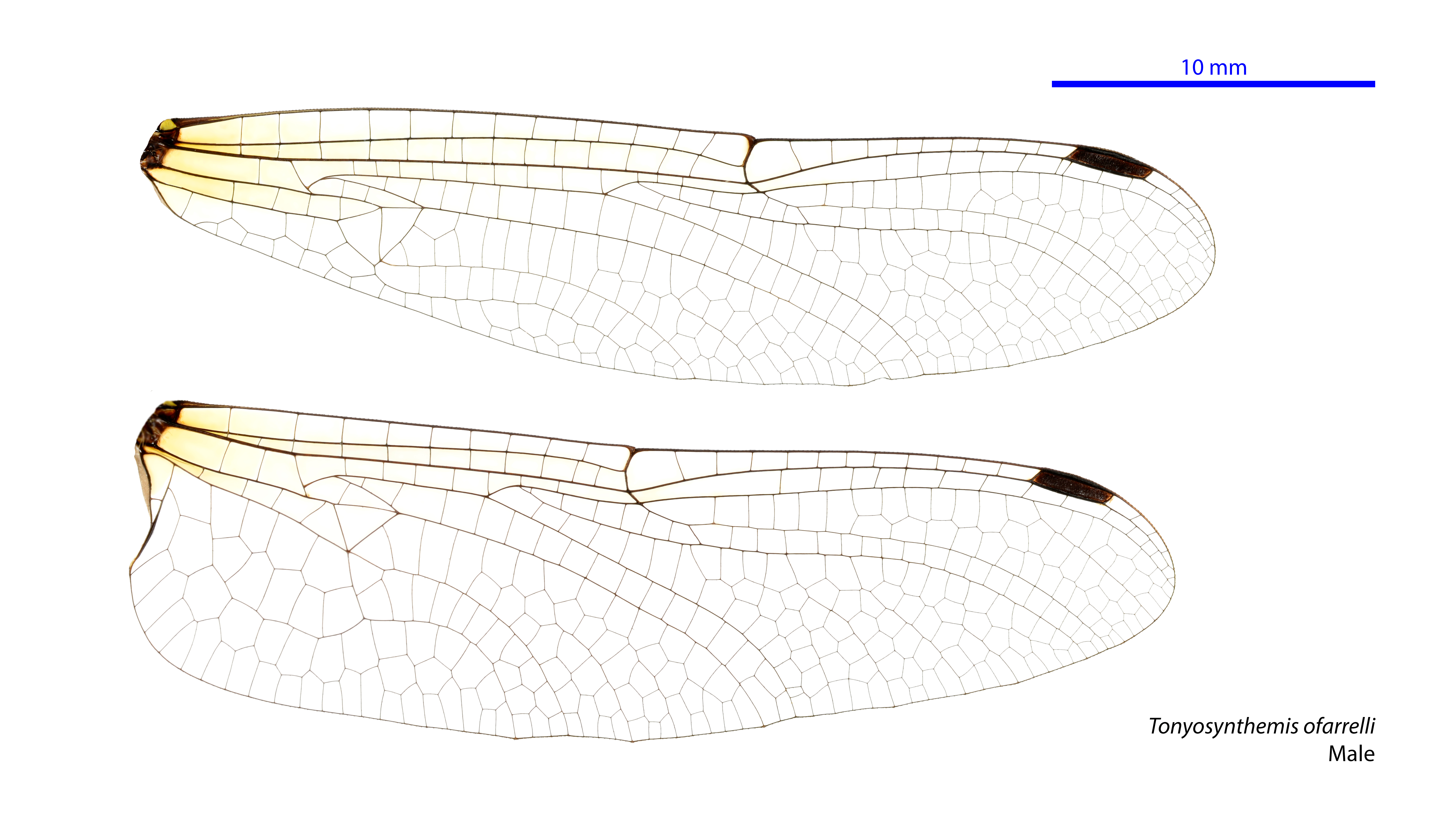
Male wings
