= Crescent Head, New South Wales =

Crescent Head
- Suburb
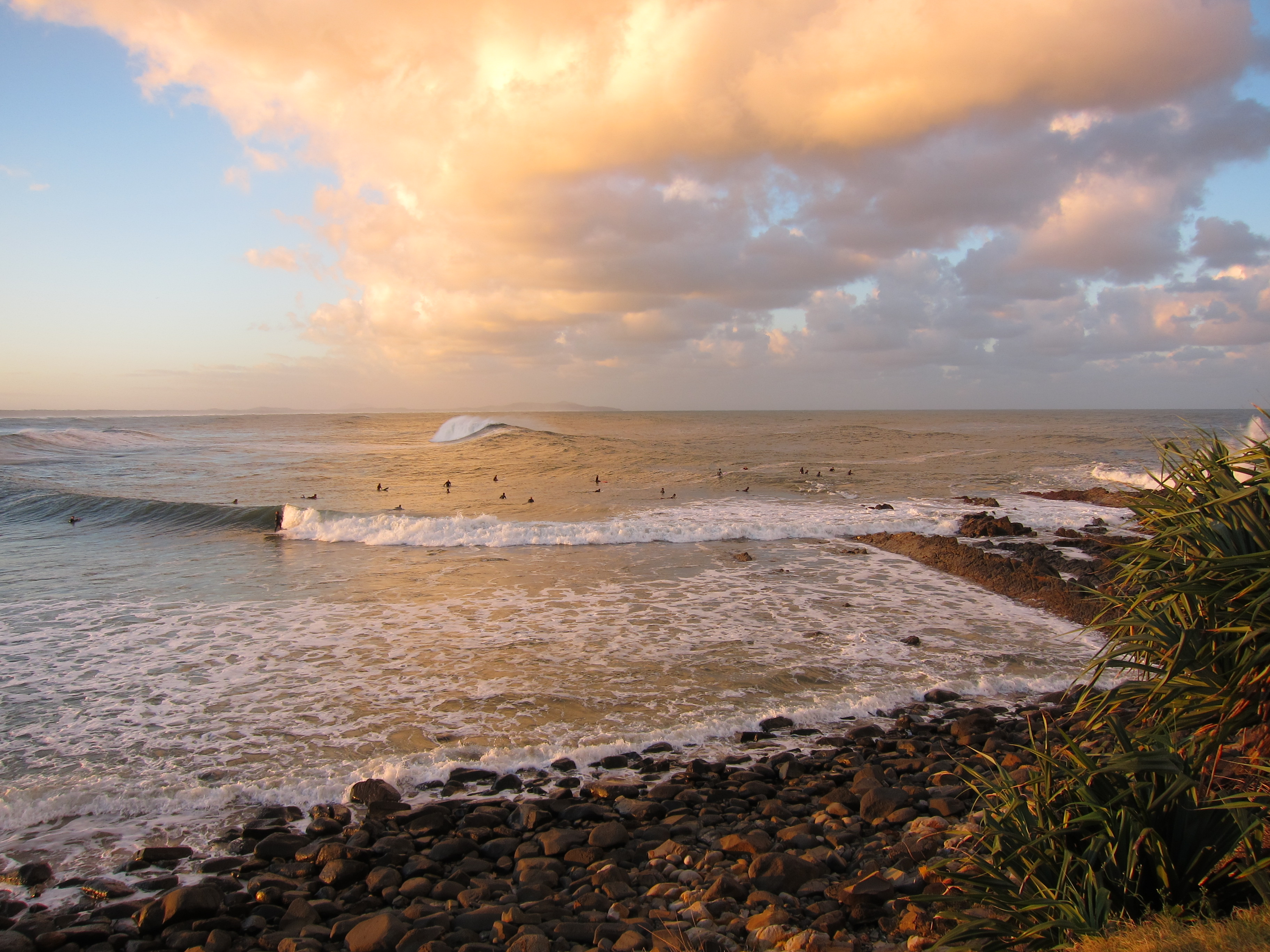
- Surfers at Crescent Head

- Interactive map of Crescent Head
- Coordinates: 31°11′30″S 152°58′30″E
- Country: Australia
- State: New South Wales
- City: Kempsey
- LGA: Kempsey Shire
- Established: 1894

Government
  - State electorate: Oxley
  - Federal division: Cowper

Population
  - Total: 978 (2021 census)
- Postcode: 2440
Suburbs around Crescent Head
Kempsey Bellbrook	Hat Head
Kundabung	Crescent Head
Telegraph Point	Port Macquarie

Crescent Head is a town on the Mid North Coast, 340 km north-northeast of Sydney, in The Kempsey Shire local government area of New South Wales, Australia. At the 2021 census, Crescent Head had a population of 978 people. Its major industries include tourism and fishing. It has a 6-hole golf course overlooking the sea.

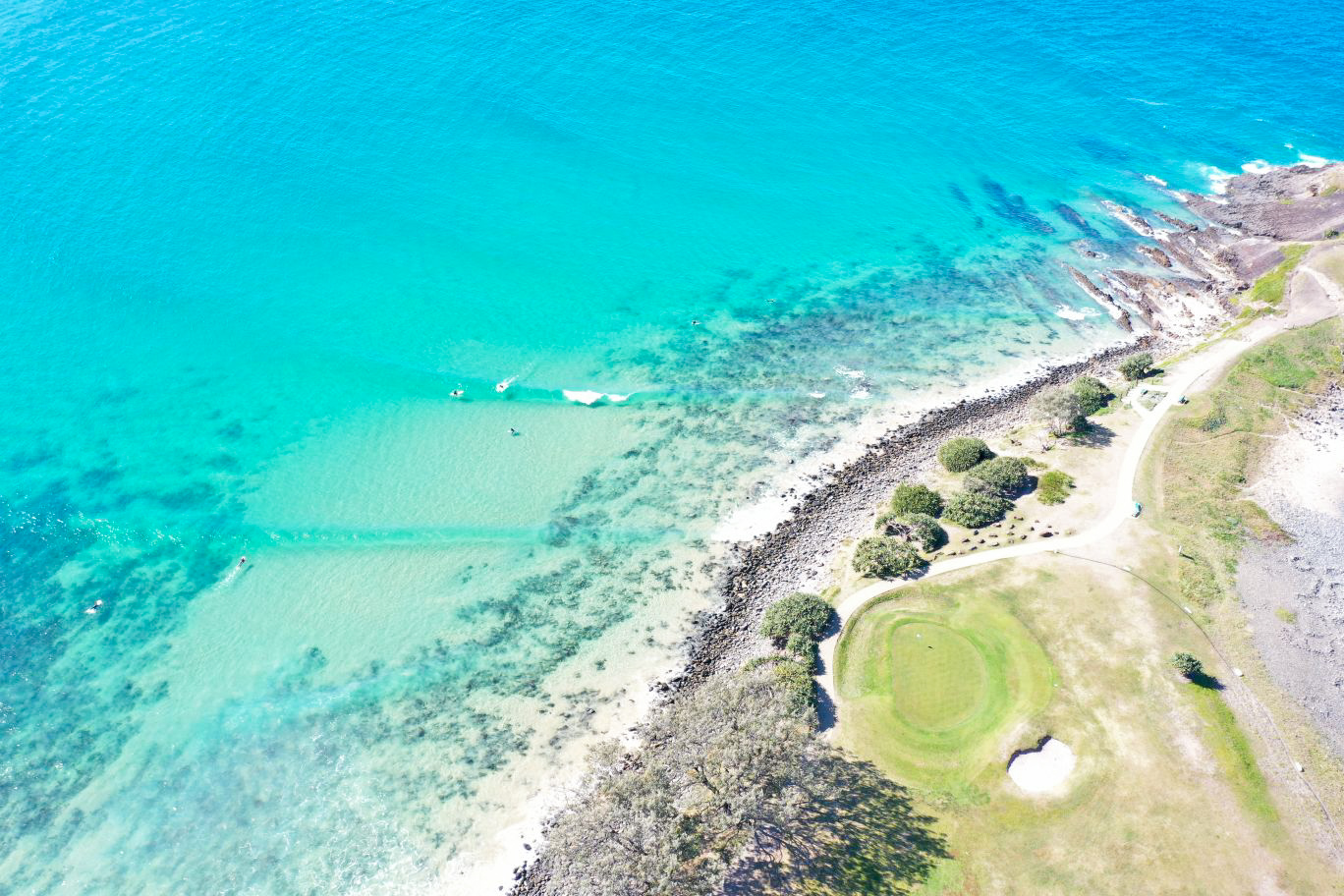
Crescent Head, NSW Australia- Point Break and Golf Course

== History ==
Crescent Head was officially declared a village in 1894, but the first mention of Crescent Head had appeared in 1833 from the NSW Calendar and General Post Office Directory.

Excerpt from the General Post Office Directory 1833: "From Port Macquarie northerly there is a beaten track and the country may present some obstructions to the formation of a road; travelling is not, however, difficult; the tracks follow the coast which is a succession of sandy beaches extending from Port Macquarie to Point Plomer, thence to Crescent Head and then to Trial Bay..."

In the 1960s and 70s, Crescent Head was a well-known surfing destination, especially for long board surfers. Crescent Head remains a surfing destination and hosts the Malibu Classic each year. It is also the ‘Trivia’ capital of the mid north coast of NSW. It all happens at the Crescent Head Tavern on a Tuesday night during school terms.

=== 1995 Crescent Head Police Murders ===
On July 9th 1995, Senior Constables Robert Spears and Peter Addison were shot dead by John McGowan, a local, in Walker Street, Crescent Head. About 12.35am that day, the Constables were performing night shift at the understaffed Kempsey Police Station, when they were called to a domestic violence report at the nearby coastal town of Crescent Head, roughly 21km away. The situation escalated after a man named John McGowan had made death threats in a phone call to a woman known to him, though she did not inform officers that he possessed a firearm. Arriving at a dwelling in Main Street just after 1am, after enquiries the officers identified his residence and parked the Police vehicle in a driveway and began to walk toward the front door.

When Senior Constables Robert Spears and Peter Addison arrived and approached McGowan's residence, McGowan who was heavily intoxicated, lying in wait in the dark, near the property's carport unexpectedly emerged wearing military-style camouflage and armed with a high powered Ruger rifle, immediately began opening fire at them. The officers returned fire with their more inferior standard issue revolvers ordering him to drop the weapon, and scrambled to find cover behind their police car. Whilst withdrawing to the police vehicle, Senior Constable Spears was shot in the head by gunfire from McGowan and collapsed onto the ground, who was later thought to have been killed instantly.

Senior Constable Addison attempted to radio for urgent backup to Port Macquarie Police Station, but due to poor radio communications, did not receive a response. As McGowan continued shooting, In a desperate effort to save his partner and summon help, Senior Constable Addison whilst returning fire, ran to a nearby neighbour’s home across the road, disregarding his own safety, to find a telephone to call for backup, only to discover they had none available. Running outside again intending to reach another property, he and McGown engaged in an frantic gunfight. Addison attempted to reload his revolver using a speed strip, but the strip slipped from his grasp and fell to the ground. McGowan then knelt, took careful aim with his rifle, and fired a shot that struck Addison in the left side of his chest, wounding him fatally.

The murderer then shortly later committed suicide with the rifle. At the inquest into the deaths of the two Constables then New South Wales Coroner Mr Derek Hand commended both men for their extraordinary courage. Special mention was made of Senior Constable Addison’s bravery in that,

“No-one would have blamed him if he had decided to seek safety. Not only was he obviously concerned about Constable Spears but he was faced with an armed man who could have caused much more death and injury in the neighborhood.”

A month after their deaths, in August 1995, the pair were awarded the NSW police force's highest honour, the Commissioner's Valour Award, and in 2015 both men posthumously received the National Police Service Medal, to be presented to their widows by NSW Police Commissioner Andrew Scipione.

The events of Sunday 9 July 1995 prompted major changes within the entire NSW Police Force to improve officer and community safety, those reforms include the transition from revolvers to automatic pistols, increased use of ballistic vests as standard use, better tactical training, and improved radio communications.

== Demographics ==
Historical population
Year	Pop.	±%
1971	630	—
1976	798	+26.7%
1981	944	+18.3%
1986	1,098	+16.3%
1991	1,208	+10.0%
1996	1,175	−2.7%
2001	1,172	−0.3%
2006	1,076	−8.2%
2011	979	−9.0%
2016	917	−6.3%
2021	978	+6.7%
Source: Australian Bureau of Statistics data.

In 2021, there were 251 families residing in Crescent Head with an average of 1.7 children per family.

2021 Population Data by Gender/Age

- 49.9% Male
- 50.1% Female
- 52 Median Age
- 13.7% Population 0–14 Years
- 28% Population Over 65

2021 Registered Marital Status

- Married 40.2%
- Separated 6.4%
- Divorced 12.2%
- Widowed 6.8%
- Never Married 34.6%

2011 Religious Affiliation

- No Religion 49.6%
- Catholic 16.0%
- Anglican 14.6%
- Uniting Church 2.9%

2021 Languages Spoken at Home

- English 88.9%
- Spanish 0.6%
- Italian 0.6%
- German 0.4%
- French 0.4%
- Urdu 0.3%

== Attractions ==
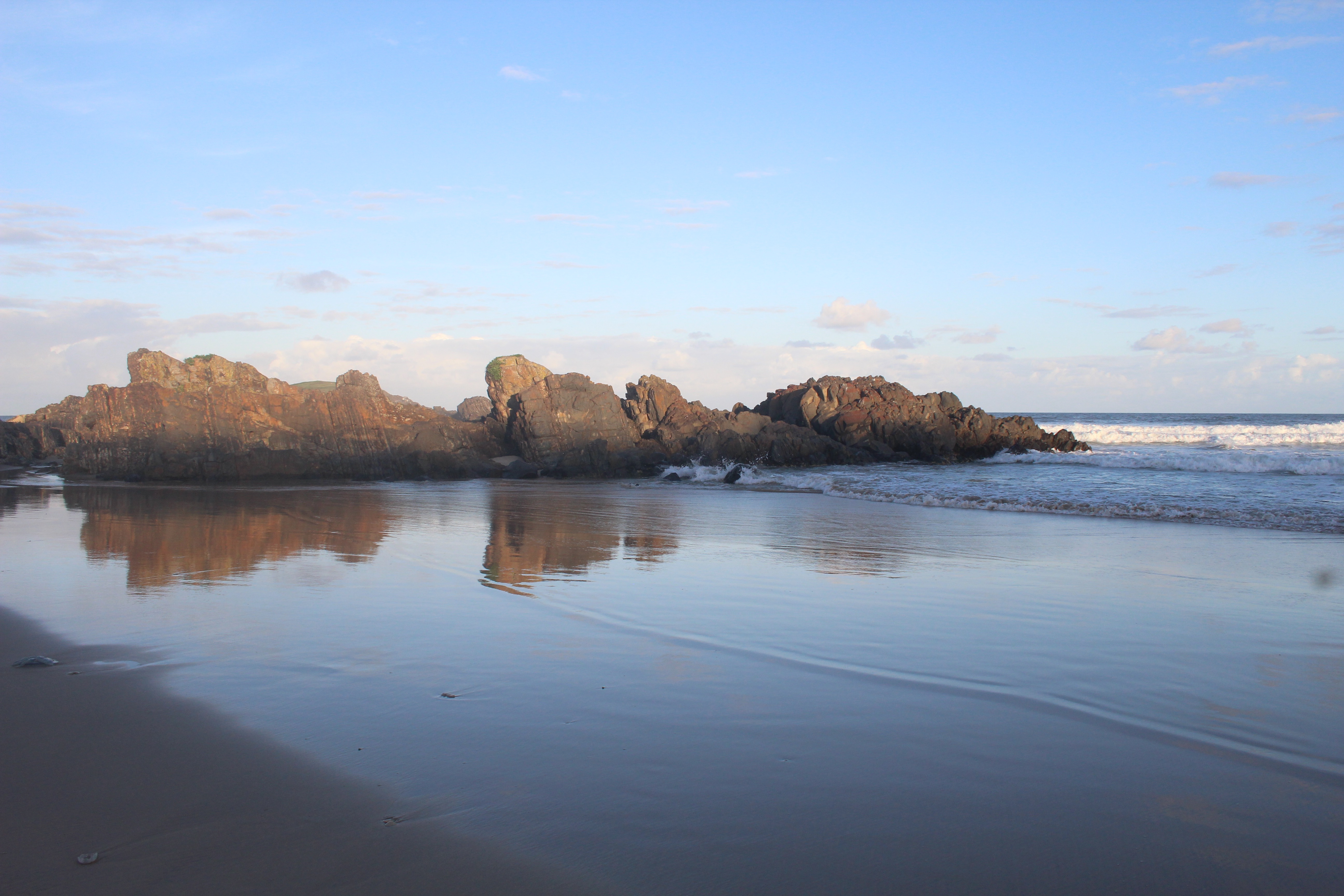
Large rocks at Goolawah National Park

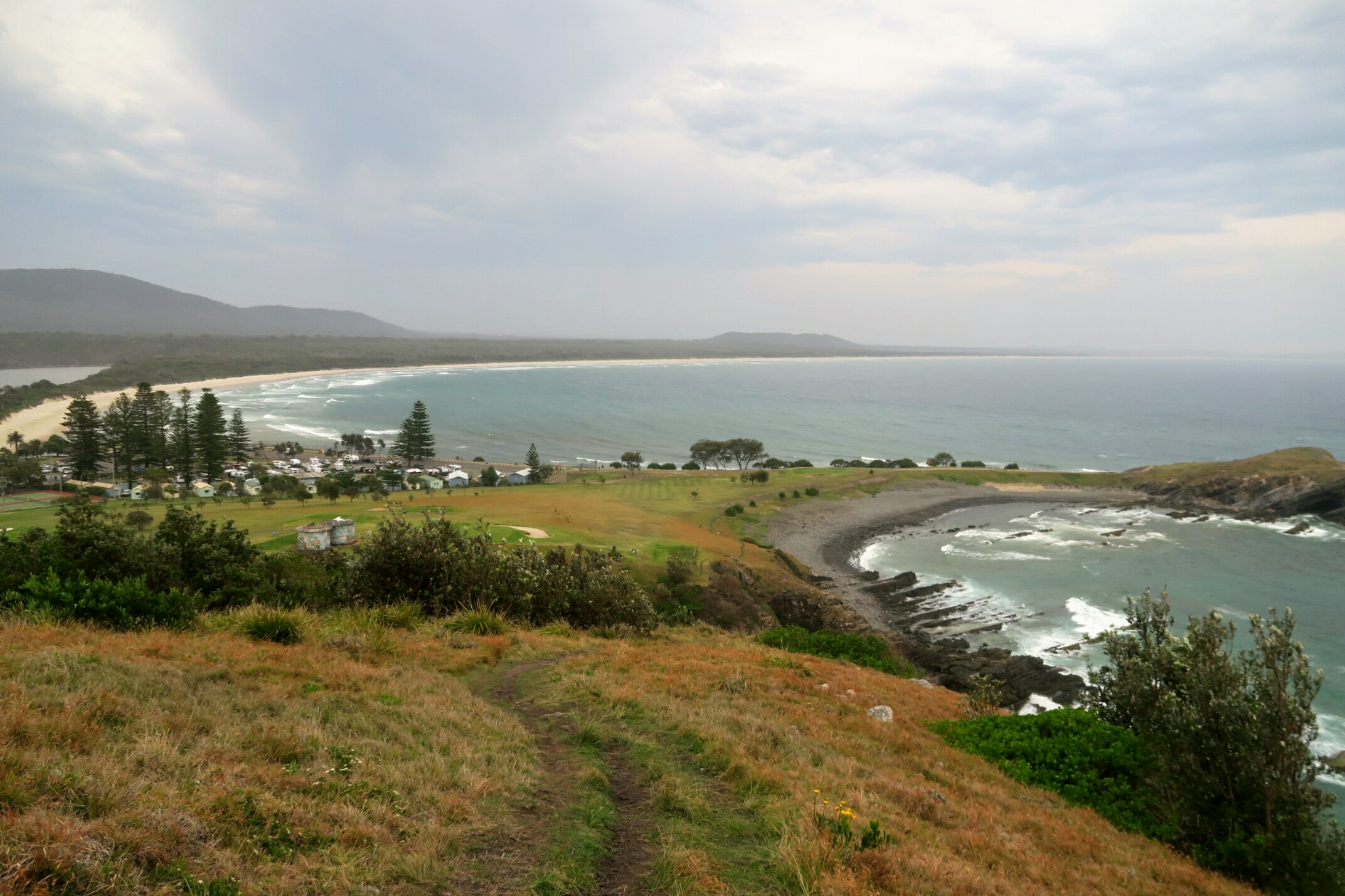
Scenic view of Crescent Head

Beaches

- Delicate Beach, which is located just south of Crescent Head, is a beautiful beach for swimming and simply enjoying nature. Camping and fishing are also popular activities at this beach. Swimming with caution is advised as no life guards are present at this beach. Delicate Campground next to it is a dog-friendly campground surrounded by kilometres of sheltered leash-free dog beaches.
- Killick Beach is known as one of Australia's best beaches and it serves as the location for the annual Crescent Head Malibu Classic. Surfing conditions are perfect for long boards due to long slow wave breaks. This family-friendly white sand beach also provides sheltered swimming and a playground for children.

Golf

- Crescent Head Country Club's six-hole golf course provides stunning ocean views for golfers. Humpback whales can also be viewed from the golf course between May and November (winter-spring season).

Hiking

- Big Hill Rainforest Walking Track provides scenic coastal views and lush wildlife. The walking trail includes rainforest vegetation including strangler figs and coastal blackbutt. Microbats are known to inhabit the area and are often spotted at sunset. The trail serves as a good whale watching spot in the spring and winter months.

Art

- Banyandah Studio, which is located approximately 15 minutes from Crescent Head, provides a showcase of local art. The studio is also known for its encaustic painting which involves using hot beeswax as paints. The studio serves as the location for '6Ps Surf Films' and is known to occasionally demonstrate film editing to visitors. The studio is situated on a working alpaca farm.

National Parks

- Goolawah National Park is a good place for camping on the beach, surfing, snorkeling, fishing, bird watching and whale watching (during the winter and spring seasons). Dolphins, turtles, koalas and dingoes are often spotted at the park. The beaches are secluded and showcase native local plant life.
- Limeburners Creek National Park features native plant life and abundant wildlife, pristine beaches and serves as a great place for swimming, fishing and surfing. There are two camp grounds located within Limeburners Creek National Park: 'Melaleuca Camping Ground' and 'Point Plomer Camping Ground'.

Other

- Crescent Aquatic Centre

== Transportation ==
Buses run between Crescent Head and Kempsey, two to three times a day. (There is no bus service on Sundays.)

== Community Groups ==
- Crescent Head and Point Plomer Bush Care

== Schools ==
Ongoing activities and schools in Crescent Head include;

Crescent Head Playgroup

- The playgroup is for both children and their families or carers to attend. It caters to ages 0–5 years old with crafts, music, book reading and other activities. Playgroup is held each Wednesday morning during school terms at the Baker Drive Community Hall.

Crescent Head Community Preschool

Crescent Head Primary School

Secondary Education

- There are several secondary schools at Kempsey, approximately 22 km away.
