= Pipers Creek =

Pipers Creek may refer to:

- Pipers Creek (New South Wales), a tributary of the Maria River, in New South Wales, Australia
- Pipers Creek (Seattle), an urban stream in Seattle, Washington, United States of America
