= Dondingalong, New South Wales =

Dondingalong Kempsey, New South Wales
- Coordinates: 31°07′00″S 152°44′00″E
- Population: 664 (2016 census)
- Postcode(s): 2440
- Location: 14 km (9 mi) SW of Kempsey
- LGA(s): Kempsey Shire
- State electorate(s): Oxley
- Federal division(s): Cowper

Dondingalong is a locality in the Kempsey Shire of New South Wales, Australia. It had a population of 664 as of the 2016 census.

== Community facilities ==
The Dondingalong Bush Fire Brigade was formally established in August 1981 but had existed in some form since 1942.

The Dondingalong Multi-Purpose Centre is located at the Kalateenee Recreational Reserve.

The Dondingalong Off-Road Circuit, operated by the Kempsey Macleay Off Road Club, located off Gowings Hill Road, is a popular racing venue.

The Pipers Creek Grove (also known as Dondingalong Organic Bushfoods) bushfood plantation is located at Dondingalong.

== History ==
Dondingalong Public School opened in 1865, was half-time with Sherwood from 1872 to 1876, closed from 1876 to 1881 and was half-time with Sherwood from 1881 to 1882. It operated as a full-time school from 1882 to 1916, during 1918, and from 1928 until it was closed permanently in 1965.

A postal receiving office at Dondingalong opened on 1 August 1896, became a post office on 1 July 1927, and closed on 30 June 1931.

The former Dondingalong Uniting Church (formerly a Wesleyan and Methodist church) opened in 1892. It has closed and been sold.

Dondingalong was affected by a bushfire on 12 February 2017, which destroyed two homes, seven outbuildings, fencing and stock.

== Heritage listings ==
Dondingalong has a number of heritage-listed sites, including:

- Bonnie Corner Road, Kumbatine National Park: Pipers Creek Lime Kilns
