= Pipers Creek (New South Wales) =

Coordinates: 31°15′S 152°50′E

Location
- Country: Australia
- State: New South Wales
- Region: NSW North Coast (IBRA), Mid North Coast
- Local government area: Kempsey

Physical characteristics
- Source
  - location: Ballengarra State Forest
  - elevation: 180 m (590 ft)
- Mouth: confluence with the Maria River
  - location: near Telegraph Point
  - elevation: 3 m (9.8 ft)
- Length: 32 km (20 mi)

Basin features
- River system: Hastings River catchment

The Pipers Creek, a watercourse that is part of the Hastings River catchment, is located in the Mid North Coast region of New South Wales, Australia.

== Course and features ==
Pipers Creek rises about 4 kilometres (2.5 mi) northwest of the Ballengarra trigonometry station, within the Ballengarra State Forest. The river flows generally east by south and then south before reaching its confluence with the Maria River north northeast of Telegraph Point. The river descends 177 metres (581 ft) over its 32 kilometres (20 mi) course.

The Pacific Highway transverses the river near Kundabung.

== See also ==
- Rivers of New South Wales
- List of rivers of New South Wales (L-Z)
- List of rivers of Australia
