= Wilson River =

Wilson River can refer to:

- Wilson River (Alaska), one of two rivers in Alaska in the United States
- Wilson River (Manitoba), tributary of Dauphin Lake, one of two in Canada
- Wilson River (New South Wales) in New South Wales, Australia
- Wilson River (New Zealand) in New Zealand
- Wilson River (Nunavut) in Nunavut in Canada
- Wilson River (Oregon) on the coast of Oregon in the United States
- Wilson River (Queensland) in South West Queensland, Australia
- Wilson River (Western Australia), in the Kimberley

== See also ==
- Willson River, South Australia
- Wilsons River (New South Wales)
