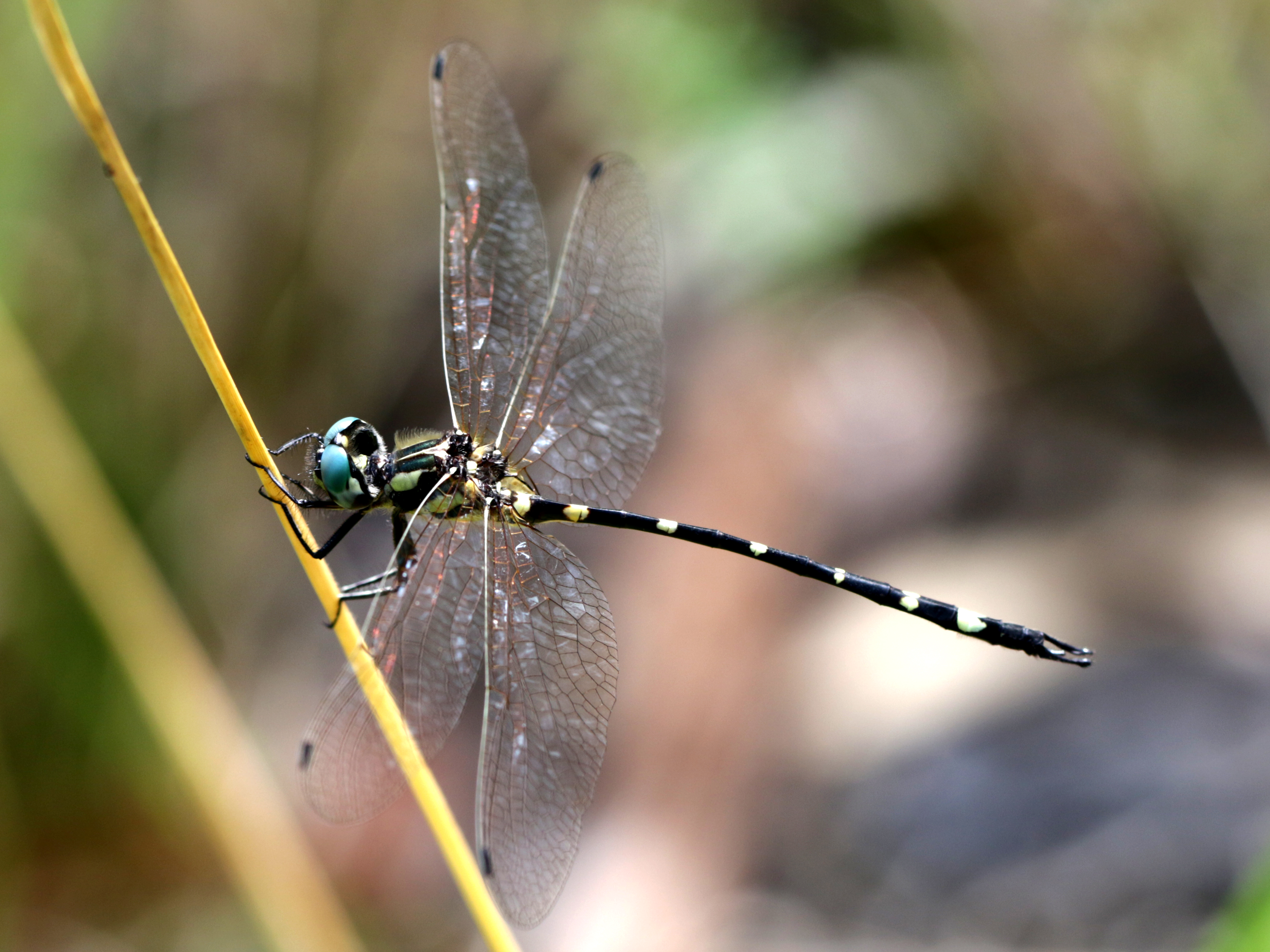
- Male, Queensland, Australia

Conservation status
- Near Threatened (IUCN 3.1)

Scientific classification
- Kingdom: Animalia
- Phylum: Arthropoda
- Clade: Pancrustacea
- Class: Insecta
- Order: Odonata
- Suborder: Anisoptera
- Superfamily: Libelluloidea
- Family: Synthemistidae
- Genus: Tonyosynthemis
- Species: T. claviculata

Binomial name
- Tonyosynthemis claviculata (Tillyard, 1909)

Synonyms
- Synthemis claviculata Tillyard, 1909

= Tonyosynthemis claviculata =

Species of dragonfly

Tonyosynthemis claviculata, commonly known as the clavicle tigertail, is a species of dragonfly. They are found in Queensland, Australia, along streams and rivers, or near the eastern Australian coast and drainage basins.

== Body ==
The hindwing of an average adult is generally 30 mm or larger.

=== Male ===
One of the specimens that scientist Günther Theischinger collected and studied was male of medium length. The majority of its body was colored black, with some yellow patterns. Unlike the rest of its body, the bases of its wings (also known as subcostal space) were not black in color. The abdomen and tergum of the specimen was without a distal hair-brush, but had small, short hairs. The upper majority of the male's anal appendages were club-shaped and curved.

=== Female ===
Another of the specimens that Theischinger collected was female and of medium length. The majority of its body was colored black, with some yellow patterns. Unlike the rest of its body, the bases of its wings were not black in color. The abdomen and tergum of the specimen was without distal hair-brush, but had small, short hairs. The female's genital valves were narrow in measure, with a developed styli and a laterodistal point.

=== Larvae ===
One of the smaller specimens that Theischinger collected was a larva of average length. The body measured about 19 mm, its prementum was of a fair width and its ligula and median lobe still were in the process of development. The specimen's labial palps were still relatively small, but also had six large palpal setae, and its postocular lobe was rather bilobed. The larvae's pronotal lobe was well developed and included short setae, while its abdomen had obtuse laterodorsal on five segments.

== Etymology ==
In 1998, Günther Theischinger named the genus Tonyosynthemis in honour of two friends and fellow odonatologists, the late Tony Watson (1935–1993) and the late A. F. (Tony) O'Farrell (1917–1997). The genus name combines the name "Tony" with the existing genus name Synthemis.

The species name claviculata is the diminutive form of the Latin clavis ("cudgel"), referring to the clubbed tips of the male appendages.

== Gallery ==
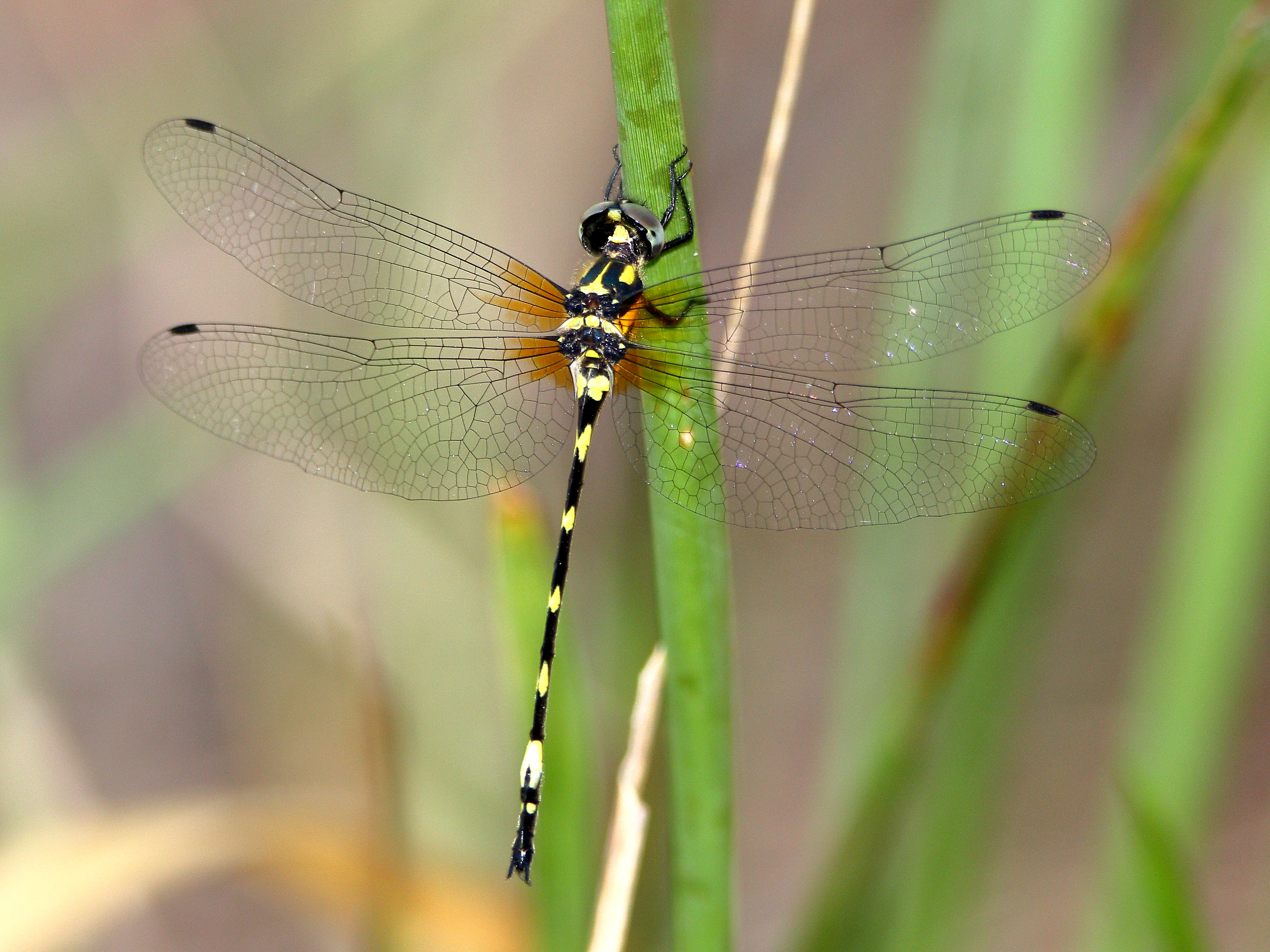
young female, north Queensland

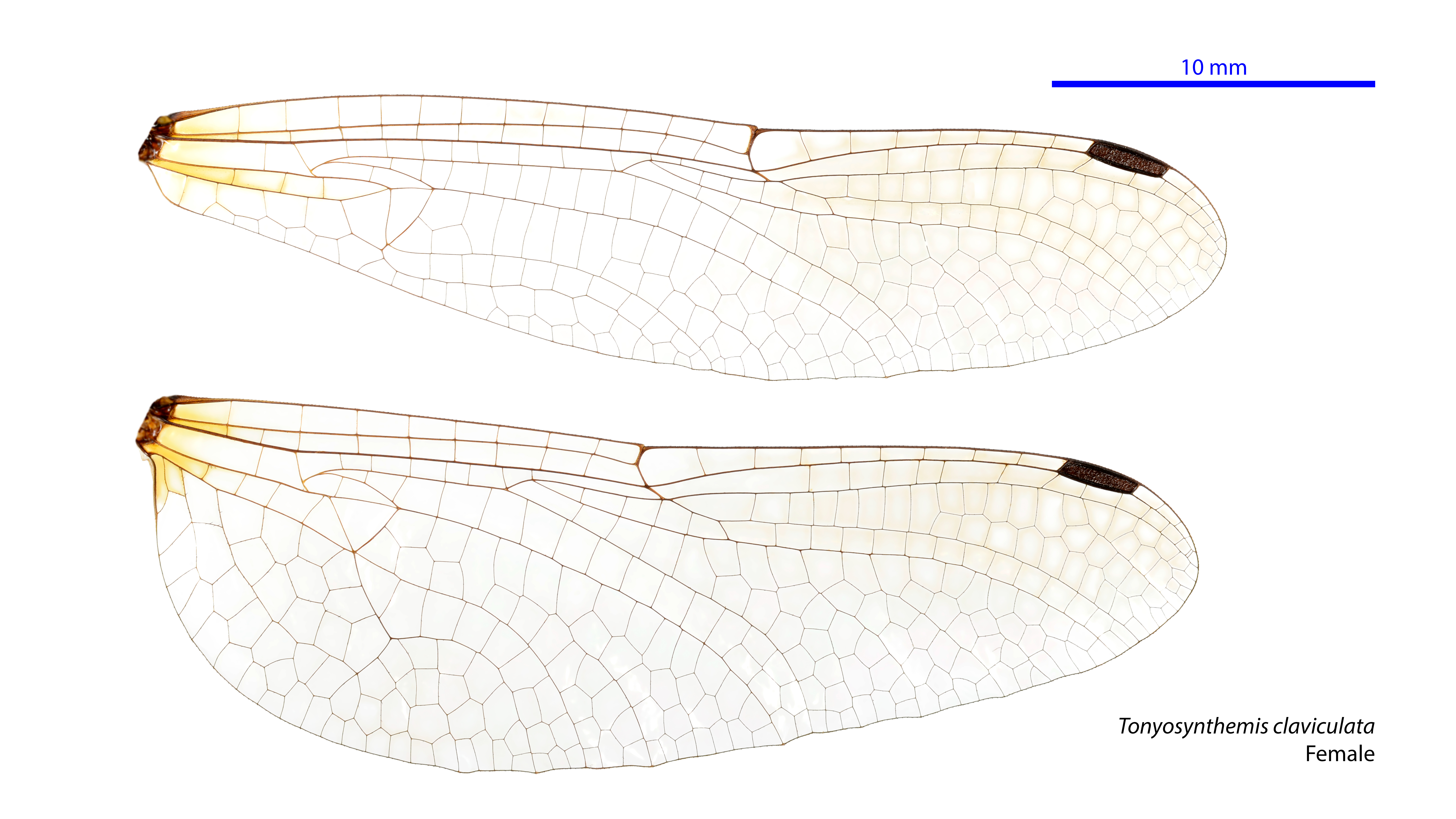
Female wings

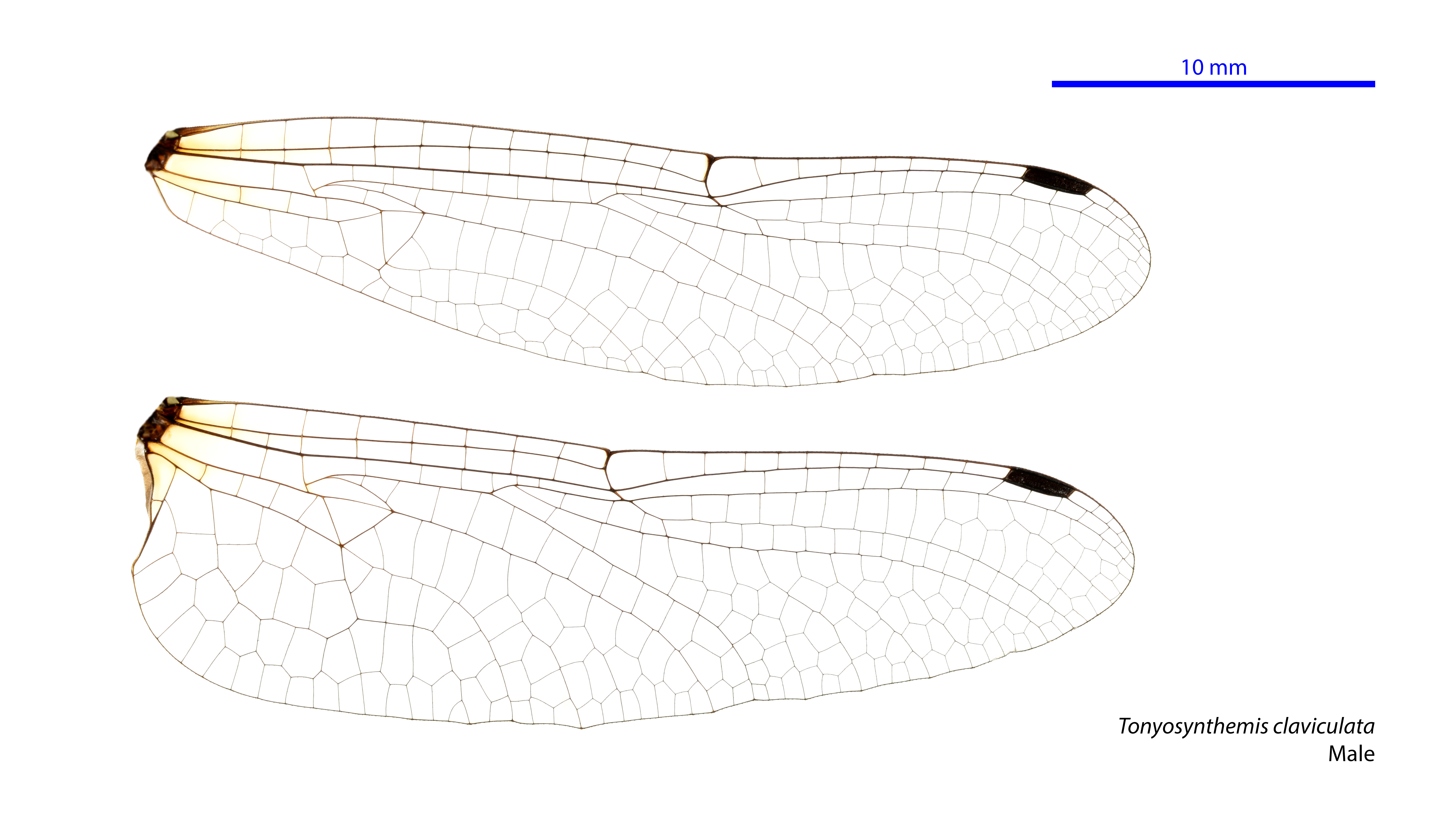
Male wings
