= Rollands Plains =

Rollands Plains New South Wales
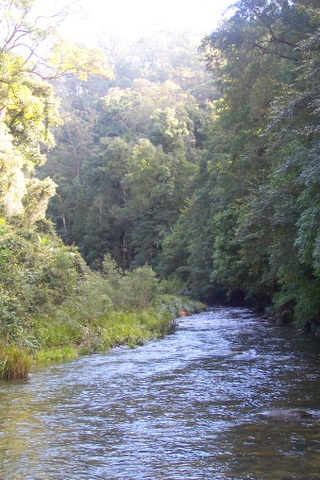
- Wilson River New South Wales near Rollands Plains

- Coordinates: 31°21′S 152°48′E
- Population: 151 (SAL 2021)
- Postcode(s): 2441
- LGA(s): Port Macquarie-Hastings Council
- County: Macquarie
- Parish: Tinebank
- State electorate(s): Port Macquarie
- Federal division(s): Lyne

Rollands Plains is a village and bounded rural locality in Mid North Coast of New South Wales, Australia.

== Location and economy ==
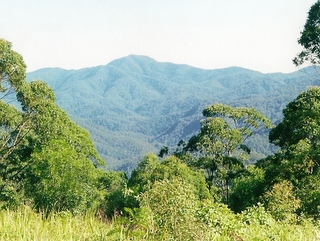
Mount Banda Banda to the west of Rollands Plains

Located 320 km north of Sydney and 20 km west of Port Macquarie, New South Wales, between the town of Telegraph Point and Willi Willi National Park it is roughly equivalent with Tinebank parish of Macquarie county. It is within Port Macquarie-Hastings Council area, and is divided into Rollands Plains and Upper Rollands Plains. Rollands Plains is also a part of the traditional Dunghutti land. The Birpai people have lived in this area for more than 40,000 years.

The economy is primarily agricultural although timber getting was dominant in the past, with parts of the locality being cleared as soldier settlements following World War I. Rollands Plains has a school of arts hall, cemetery, oval, a Rural Fire Service, and the Upper Rollands Plains Public School. The smaller Rollands Plains Public School closed in the 1960s.

The natural geography is dominated by the Wilson River, a tributary of the Hastings River. The head waters of the Wilson River is near Mount Banda Banda 20 km to the west in the Willi Willi National Park. A number of state forest reservations also lie to the north of the village.

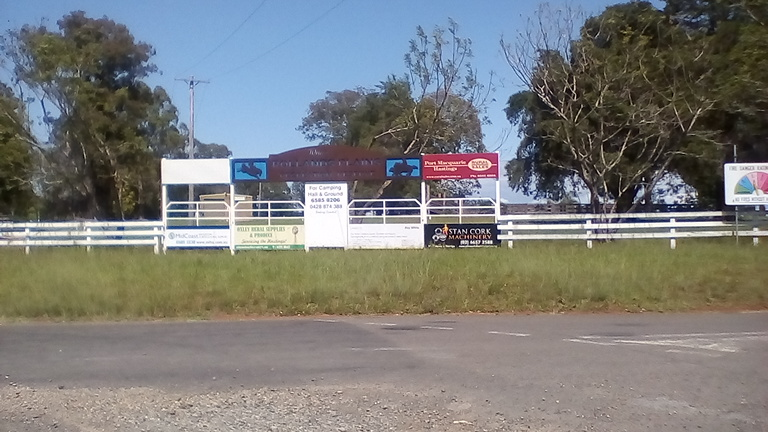
Rollands Plains Race Track, fire station and cemetery, village centre Rollands Plains NSW.

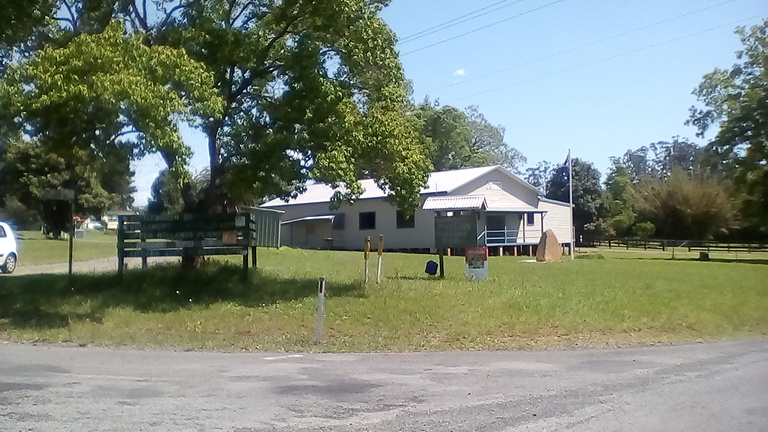
Rollands Plains village centre 2018

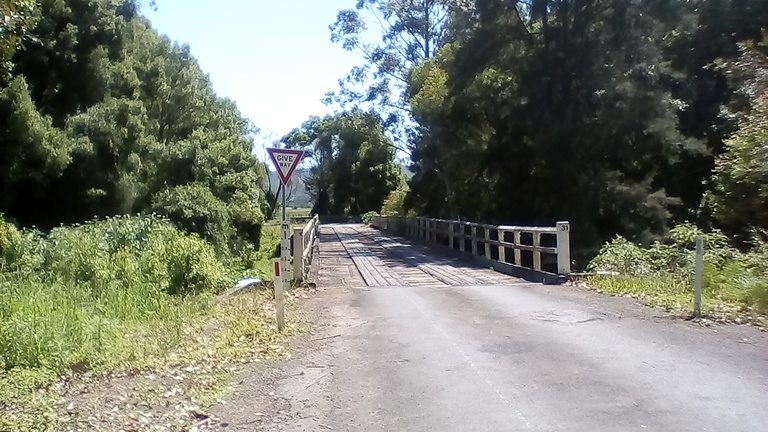
Bridge over the Bril Bril Creek on the edge of Rollins Plains village centre. Mid north Coast of New South Wales.

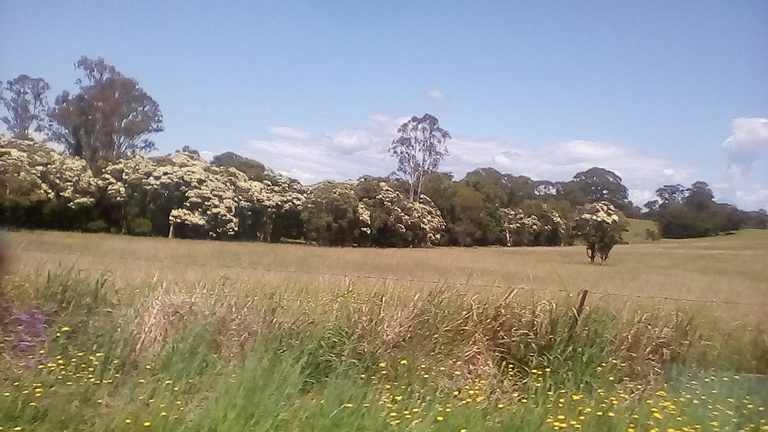
Landscape of Upper Rollands Plains New South Wales.

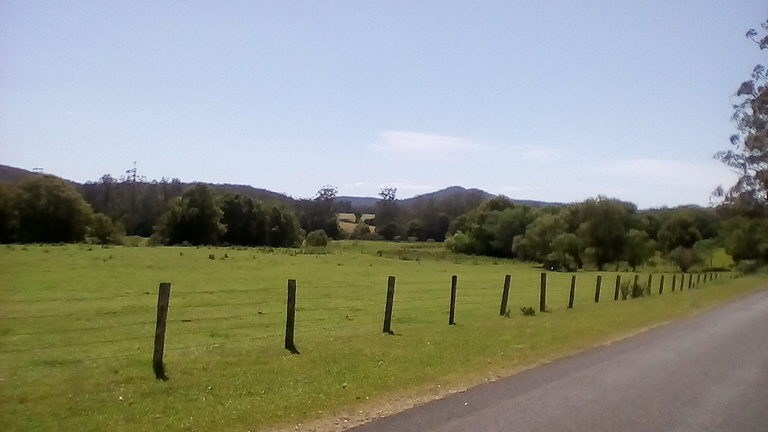
Landscape of Rolland's Plains New South Wales.

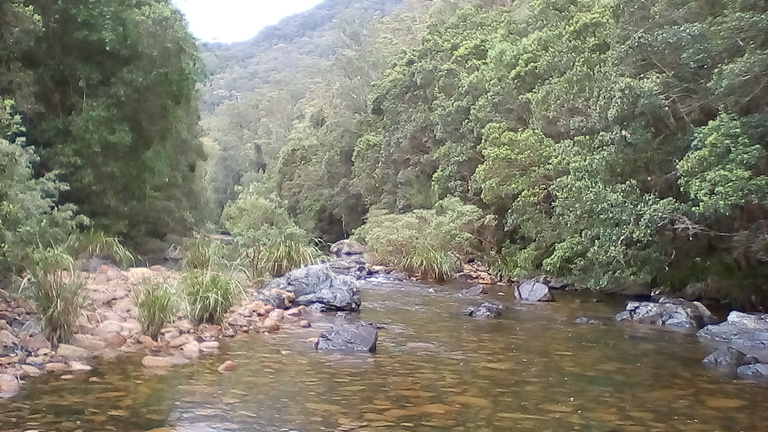
Mount Cogo and the Wilson River west of Port Macquarie on the Mid North Coast of News South Wales.

== Etymology ==
The name Rollands Plains derives from Captain John Rolland, the Commandant of nearby Port Macquarie. Taken ill at sea in 1824, he sailed to Port Macquarie seeking medical attention. Medical attention of the day was not able to save him and he was interred at the Church of St Thomas Port Macquarie, under construction at the time.

== Notable residents ==
Notable residents include

- Archibald Clunes Innes
- Radford Gamack
