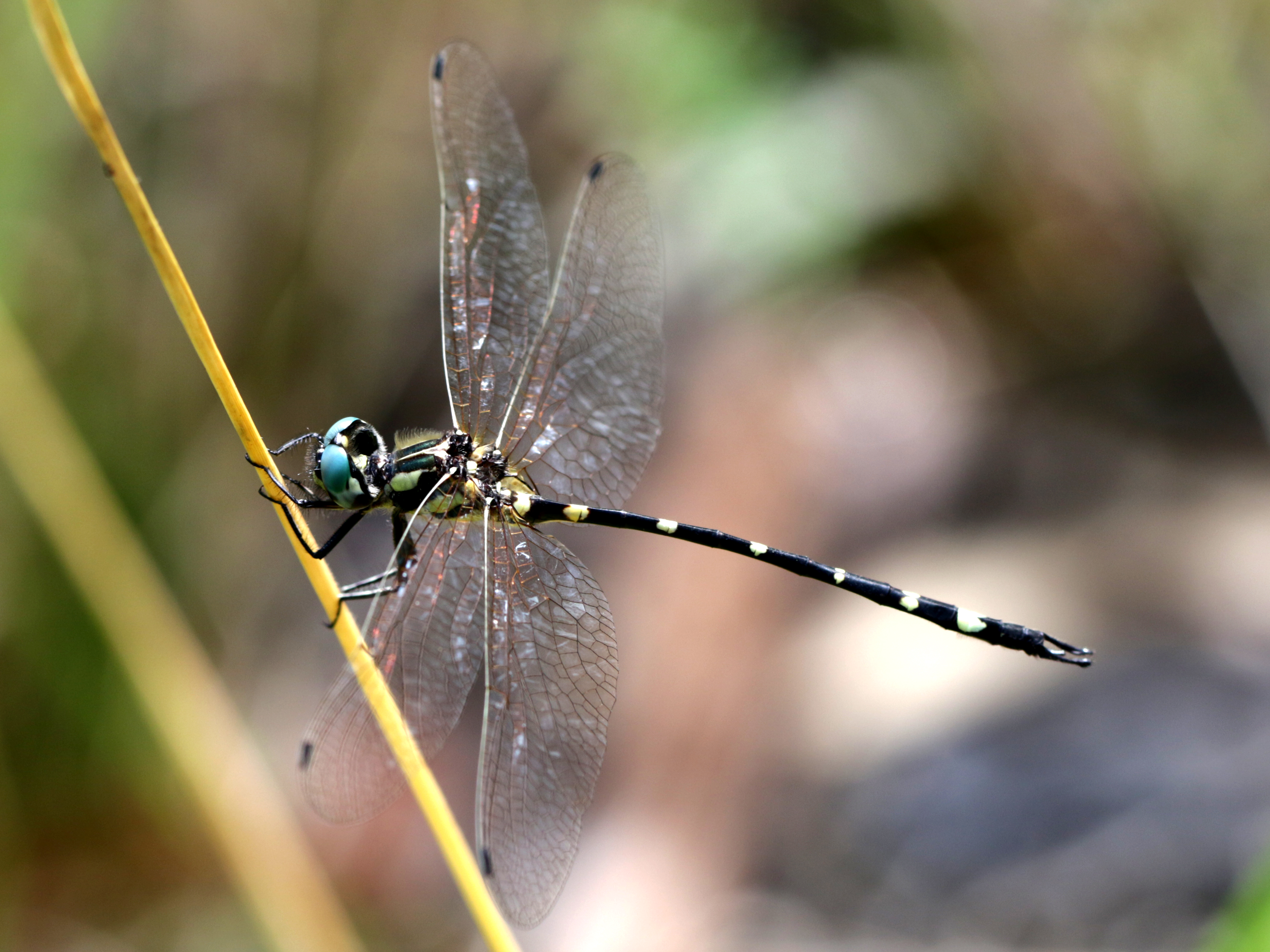
- Tonyosynthemis claviculata

Scientific classification
- Kingdom: Animalia
- Phylum: Arthropoda
- Clade: Pancrustacea
- Class: Insecta
- Order: Odonata
- Suborder: Anisoptera
- Superfamily: Libelluloidea
- Family: Synthemistidae
- Genus: Tonyosynthemis; Theischinger, 1998

= Tonyosynthemis =

Genus of dragonflies

Tonyosynthemis is a genus of slender black and yellow dragonflies in the family Synthemistidae. It is endemic to eastern Australia.

== Species ==
The genus contains only two species:

- Tonyosynthemis claviculata (Tillyard, 1909) - clavicle tigertail
- Tonyosynthemis ofarrelli (Theischinger & Watson, 1986) - slender tigertail

== Etymology ==
In 1998, Günther Theischinger named the genus Tonyosynthemis in honour of two friends and fellow odonatologists, the late Tony Watson (1935–1993) and the late A. F. (Tony) O'Farrell (1917–1997). The genus name combines the name "Tony" with the existing genus name Synthemis.

== See also ==
- List of Odonata species of Australia
