= Kundabung, New South Wales =

Kundabung New South Wales
- Coordinates: 31°12′S 152°51′E
- Population: 616 (SAL 2021)
- Postcode(s): 2441
- Location: 487 km (303 mi) north of Sydney
- LGA(s): Kempsey Shire
- State electorate(s): Oxley
- Federal division(s): Cowper

Kundabung is a locality on the North Coast of New South Wales, Australia.

== Transport ==
The North Coast railway line passes through, and a station existed at the site between 1917 and 1974. At the 2006 census, Kundabung had a population of 586 people. The town's name is derived from an aboriginal word meaning "wild apples". The Pacific Highway also crosses the locality.

Preceding station	Former services	Following station
Kempsey towards Brisbane	North Coast Line	Telegraph Point towards Maitland
