= Telegraph Point, New South Wales =

Telegraph Point New South Wales
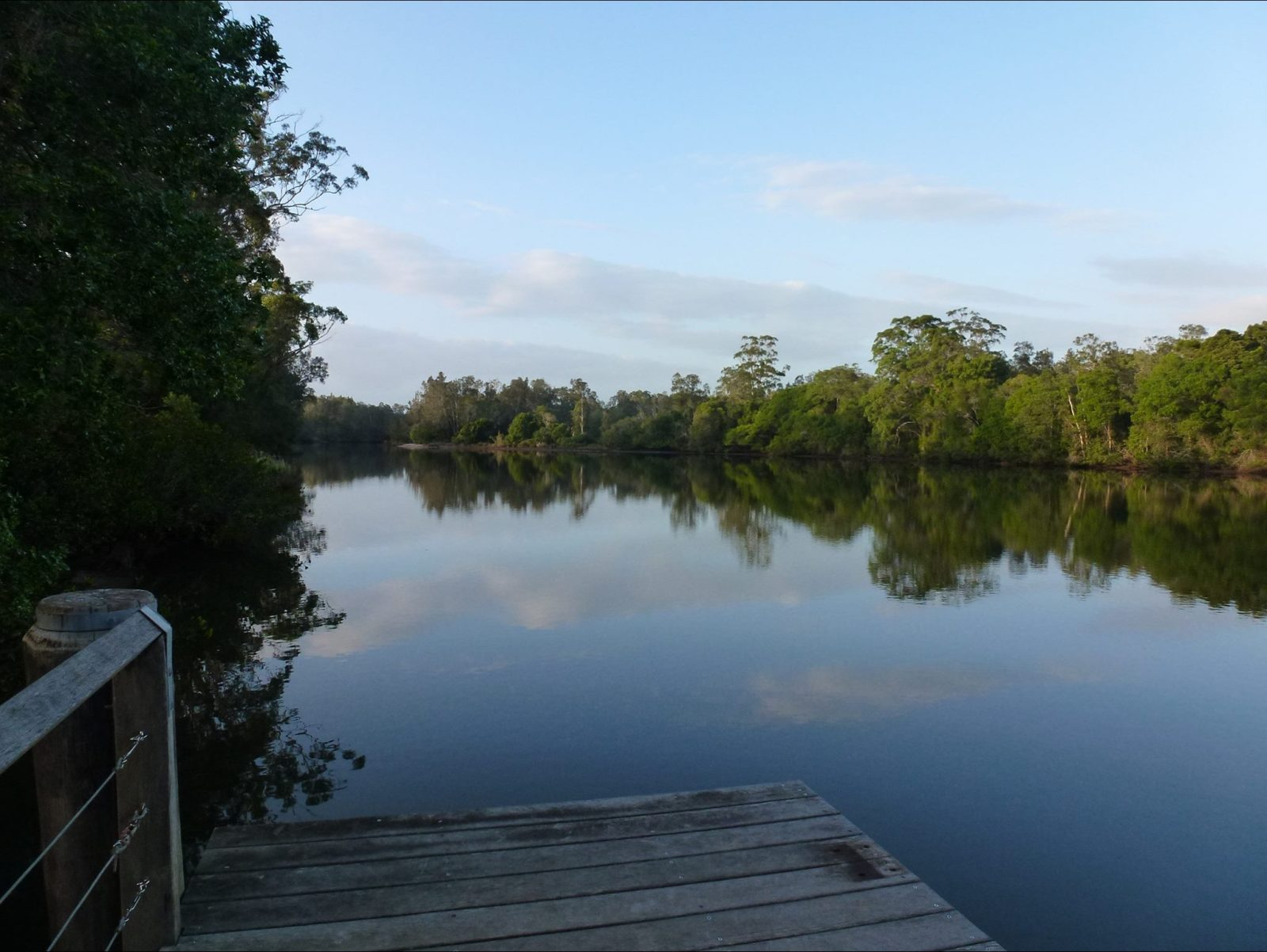
- The Wilson River from Log Wharf Reserve

- Coordinates: 31°20′S 152°48′E
- Population: 604 (2021 census)
- Postcode(s): 2441
- Location: 13 km (8 mi) from Port Macquarie
- LGA(s): Port Macquarie-Hastings Council
- County: Macquarie
- State electorate(s): Port Macquarie
- Federal division(s): Cowper

Telegraph Point is a small village on the North Coast of New South Wales, Australia. It is located on the Pacific Highway north of Port Macquarie, and on the North Coast railway line. The village spans both sides of the Wilson River.

== Demography ==
In the 2016 census, Telegraph Point recorded a population of 609 people, 52.4% male and 47.6% female. A total of 250 private dwellings was recorded with an average of 2.6 people per household. The internet was not accessed by 16.9% of dwellings. The median weekly household income was $1,199. The median monthly mortgage repayment was $1,345 and the median weekly rent was $310. 84.4% of people in Telegraph Point were born in Australia. Aboriginal and/or Torres Strait Islander people made up 3.1% of the population. 21.6% of the local population had either one or both parents born overseas.

In the 2011 census, Telegraph Point recorded a population of 619 people, 52.7% male and 48.3% female. The median/average age of the Telegraph Point population is 46 years — 9 years above the Australian average. The country of birth of Telegraph Point residents is 3.2% England, 0.5% Germany, 0.6% Fiji, 0.5% Denmark, 2.4% New Zealand. 94% of people spoke only English at home; the next most common languages were 0.5% Lao, 0.5% German, 0.5% Fijian Hindustani, 0.5% Danish, 0.5% Spanish. The religious make up of Telegraph Point is 30.2% Anglican, 4% Presbyterian and Reformed, 2.6% Uniting Church, 20.7% No Religion, 26.3% Catholic. 51.7% of people are married, 29.3% have never married and 11.8% are separated or divorced. There are 18 widowed people living in Telegraph Point. The median individual income is $449.00 per week and the median household income is $1068.00 per week. 37.2% are fully owned, and 45.1% are in the process of being purchased by home loan mortgage. 13.5% of homes are rented. The median rent in Telegraph Point is $150 per week and the median mortgage repayment is $1560 per month.

== Facilities ==
The Telegraph Point Public School is a primary school from k to grade six.

Local activities include waterskiing, mountain bike riding, bush walking, four-wheel-driving, camping, swimming, rock hopping in streams and creeks and picnicking. The village lies between two areas of state forest with a range of different bushwalking and scenic drive trails. South of the village is Cairncross State Forest, while to the north is Ballengarra State Forest. During the summer months, the local man-made lake and holiday park Stoney Park is turned into a Fun Park at Stoney Aqua Park.

Regular community activities are held at the Community Hall including a local book club, history association, craft activities, yoga, and all-ages fitness classes.

The local sports field, Charlie Watt Reserve, is the home of the Port Macquarie Dog Club and the training field for the Western Phoenix Soccer club.

== History ==
The traditional owners of country throughout the Telegraph Point and Rollands Plains region are the Ngaku people (north of the Wilson River along the coast and inland to Kemps Pinnacle in the Willi Willi National Park), and the Ngambaa peoples (south of the Upper Wilson River, inland through Bril Bril towards the Manning).

The first European land grants in the Telegraph Point area were issued in the region then-known as ‘Prospect’ in 1832. The name derives from the telegraph line which crossed the river in 1869. The river played an important role in the logging of the surrounding forests and there are the remains of several old wharves to be seen, the best-preserved of which is on the south bank beside the traffic bridge in Log Wharf Reserve.

A railway station was located in the town between 1917 and 1983. In April 1974, the town was bypassed by the Pacific Highway with the construction of a 555 metre 15 span bridge as part of a six kilometre deviation.
