= Kumbatine National Park =

National park in New South Wales, Australia

- IUCN category II (national park)
- Location within New South Wales
- Location: New South Wales
- Coordinates: 31°08′35″S 152°36′05″E
- Area: 130 km^{2} (50 sq mi)
- Established: 1999
- Governing body: NSW National Parks & Wildlife Service

Kumbatine is a national park located in New South Wales, Australia, 332 kilometres (206 mi) northeast of Sydney.

== Geography ==
Glencoe Creek is located wholly within Kumbatine National Park.

The most prominent and highest mountain in the national park is Mount Kippara with an altitude of 484 metres.

== See also ==
- Protected areas of New South Wales
