= Wilson River (New South Wales) =

Coordinates: 28°31′10″S 153°21′17″E

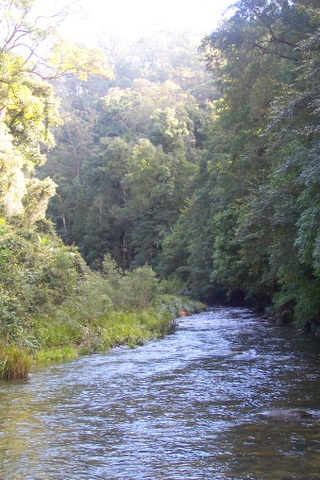
- Wilson River, downstream of Mount Banda Banda

Location
- Country: Australia
- State: New South Wales
- IBRA: NSW North Coast
- District: Mid North Coast
- Local government area: Port Macquarie-Hastings

Physical characteristics
- Source: Mount Banda Banda
  - location: in Willi Willi National Park
  - elevation: 554 m (1,818 ft)
- Mouth: confluence with the Maria River
  - location: Telegraph Point, north of Wauchope
- Length: 69 km (43 mi)

Basin features
- River system: Hastings River catchment
- Tributaries
  - left: Glencoe Creek
- National park: Willi Willi NP

Wilson River, a perennial river of the Hastings River catchment, is located in the Mid North Coast region of New South Wales, Australia.

== Course and features ==
Wilson River rises on the south-eastern slopes of Mount Banda Banda in Willi Willi National Park, and flows generally east southeast, before reaching its confluence with the Maria River, near Telegraph Point, north of Wauchope. The river descends 559 metres (1,834 ft) over its 69 kilometres (43 mi) course.

Glencoe Creek is a tributary.

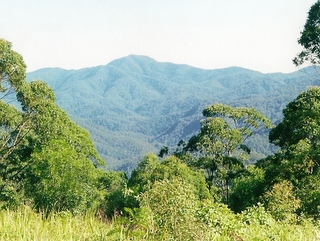
Mount Banda Banda headwaters of the Wilson River, to the west of Rollands Plains.

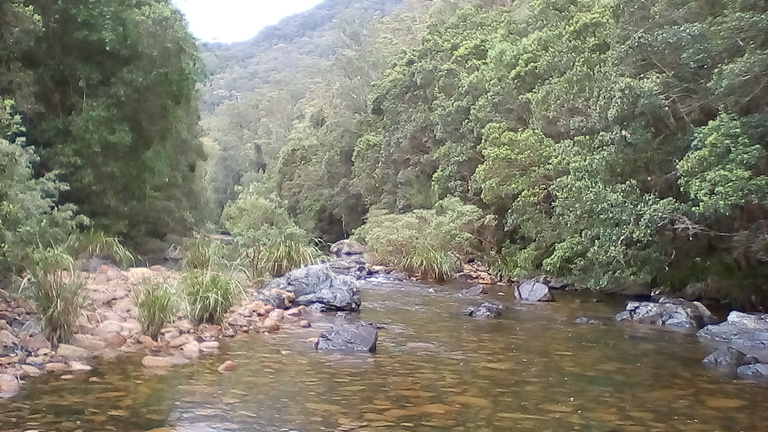
Wilson River at foot of Mount Cogo west of Port Macquarie

== See also ==
- Rivers of New South Wales
- List of rivers of New South Wales (A–K)
- List of rivers of Australia
- Wilson River (disambiguation)
