= Barcoongere River =

Coordinates: 29°54′S 153°12′E

Barcoongere River South Arm Wooli Wooli River, Little River, Wooli River

Location
- Country: Australia
- State: New South Wales
- IBRA: NSW North Coast
- District: Northern Rivers
- Local government area: Clarence Valley

Physical characteristics
- Source: Browns Knob
  - location: near Milleara
  - elevation: 46 m (151 ft)
- Mouth: confluence with the Wooli Wooli River
  - location: near Wooli
  - elevation: 6 m (20 ft)
- Length: 46 km (29 mi)

Basin features
- National park: Yaraygir NP

Barcoongere River, a watercourse of the Wooli Wooli River catchment, is located in the Northern Rivers region of New South Wales, Australia.

== Course and features ==
Barcoongere River rises below Browns Knob near Milleara, and flows generally north northeast before reaching its confluence with the Wooli Wooli River west of Wooli, descending 46 metres (151 ft) over its 10 kilometres (6.2 mi) course.

== See also ==
- Rivers of New South Wales
- List of rivers of Australia
