= 2009–10 Australian bushfire season =

2009-10 Australian bushfire season
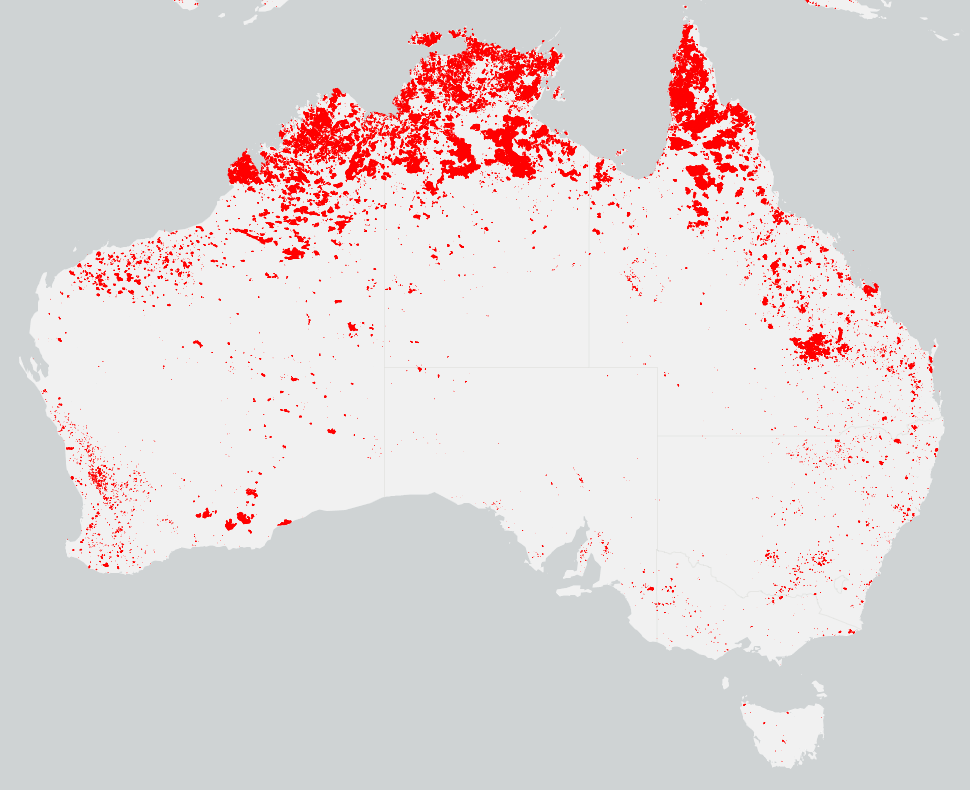
- NASA MODIS burned area detections from June 2009 to May 2010
- Date: Winter (June) 2009 - Autumn (May) 2010
- Location: Australia

Statistics
- Burned area: 800,000+ hectares

Impacts
- Deaths: 2
- Injuries: 20
- Structures destroyed: 70+ total — 64 houses — numerous non-residential structures

A bushfire season occurred predominantly from June 2009 to May 2010. Increased attention has been given to this season as authorities and government attempt to preempt any future loss of life after the Black Saturday bushfires during the previous season, 2008–09. Long range weather observations predict very hot, dry and windy weather conditions during the summer months, leading to a high risk of bushfire occurrence.

In late September, several bushfires affected southeastern and northern Queensland. In October, bushfires affected much of the central latitudes of Australia, across Western Australia, Queensland and New South Wales. In early November, a heat wave across southeastern Australia and high bushfire risk weather, precipitated a series of bushfires in those states, particularly South Australia, where 6 people were injured in separate incidents. In December, a further 5 people were injured and a helicopter pilot killed, whilst fighting bushfires in NSW. Later that month, a 60-year-old man and three other men suffered burns whilst fighting fires in Southern NSW, while major fires burnt in the Riverina, far east Gippsland and Port Lincoln.

Between Christmas and New Years 2009, bushfires affected the northern and central Wheatbelt of Western Australia, destroying 37 homes and about 3,000 hectares (7,410 acres) of bushland. In early January 2010, Victoria and South Australia experienced "Catastrophic" category fire conditions, and on 10 January, a Country Fire Authority volunteer was killed and 2 others injured after a fire truck rolled en route to a fire near Mansfield in Victoria's north east.

== Context ==
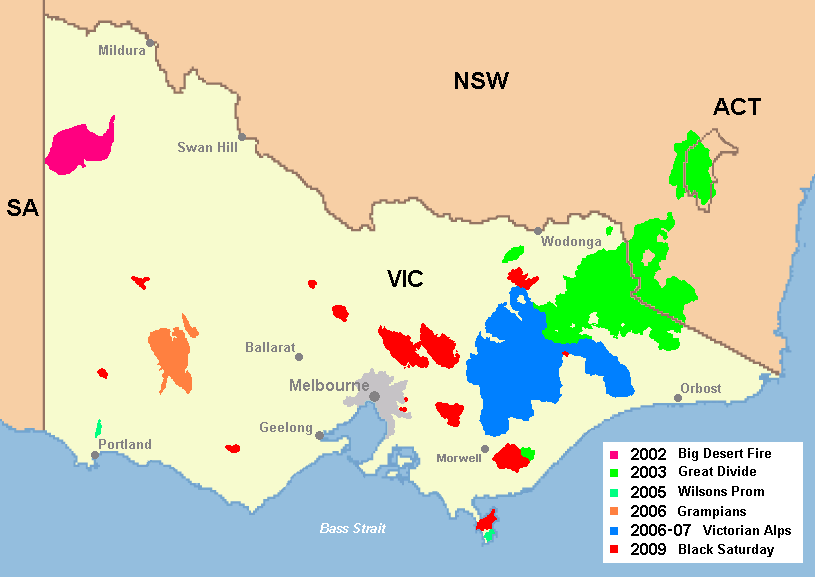
Major bushfires in Victoria throughout the 2000s

Many parts of Australia, particularly southeastern Australia, have been in drought for the last 10–15 years. This has increased the fuel load potential by drying out vegetation, and increases the potential occurrence of hot temperature and high wind combinations that precipitate extreme bushfire conditions. The drought has increased potential for extreme conditions throughout the last decade.

Major fires in the Victorian Alps during the 2003 and 2006/07 seasons and areas north-east of Melbourne in 2009, burnt large areas of vegetation in these areas resulting in reduced fuel loads in large areas of Victoria. However, other regions have not experienced major bushfires for a decade or longer, notably in the Otway Ranges, Mount Macedon, Southwest coast and much of the Dandenong Ranges, requiring increased awareness and preparedness preceding the 2009–10 season, including controlled burns, general community preparations and overall education and awareness of the general population.

== Predictions and assessments ==
Throughout mid-2009, the Government of Victoria had warned that the 2009–10 season had the potential to be "worse" than the 2008–09 season, however opponents suggest that this coming season has the same potential risk as several of the preceding seasons, but that increased awareness of the future bushfire season in general is a positive thing. A list of 52 towns in Victoria that are deemed to be most at risk was released by the government in August 2009. This list is separate from the Royal Commission's interim report released around the same time. The nominated centers will take priority for developing "township protection plans".

The Royal Commission into the Black Saturday bushfires of the preceding season released its interim report on 17 August 2009, including recommendations for the 2009–10 season and other future seasons. The recommendations included, better warning systems, increased public awareness and education preceding the season, and better chain of command within and between all relevant authorities, amongst much else.

== Fires of note ==
State	Start date	Deaths	Injuries	Houses lost	Area (ha)	Local govt.	Impacted communities & destruction	Duration	Ref.
Tas	20 November 2009			3	100 ha (250 acres)	Glamorgan-Spring Bay	—Dolphin Sands & Swansea: Several non-residential structures destroyed		
NSW	17 December 2009		1	5	7,000 ha (17,000 acres)	Greater Hume	—Gerogery: Several non-residential structures and vehicles destroyed; Major livestock losses		
NSW	17 December 2009		3	3	9,000 ha (22,000 acres)	Cooma-Monaro	—Michelago: Several non-residential structures and vehicles destroyed; Several thousand head of livestock perish		
NSW	17 December 2009			2	11,500 ha (28,000 acres)	Tumbarumba	—Tooma: Several non-residential structures and vehicles lost; Major livestock losses		
SA	23 December 2009		5	13	650 ha (1,600 acres)	Port Lincoln	—Port Wakefield: SES Headquarters, 8 other non-residential structures destroyed		
WA	29 December 2009		3	38	3,000 ha (7,400 acres)	Toodyay	—Toodyay: 20 vehicles and several non-residential structures destroyed; significant livestock losses; 4 houses damaged		

== Timeline ==
=== September 2009 ===
Qld

Dry conditions and high winds from mid September onwards precipitated several bushfires throughout parts of the state. From 22 September, fires were burning west of Ingham where half a dozen properties were affected by fires. Another fire began the same day on the Mount Lindesay Highway at Cedar Creek, south-west of Brisbane.

As of 25 September, seven bushfires were burning at Coochin Creek, Cedar Pocket, Neurum, Beelbi Creek, at Johnstown and near Roma and Injune in southern Queensland. Around half of the state has been under total fire ban since 22 September.

=== October ===
Strong westerly winds fanned several bushfires across the central latitudes of Australia during October 2009, mostly in the states of Western Australia, Queensland and New South Wales. At least 20 fires are burning across Queensland, several large fires in Western Australia's Kimberly region and several fires on NSW Central Coast, as of 16 October.

WA

Throughout October, bushfires burnt around 800,000 hectares of land in the Kimberley. Most major fires are burning in the North Kimberley region, east of the Mitchell Plateau. One fire, burning near Broome, on 14 October, threatened property and homes in the outer suburb of Coconut Wells.

Other major bushfires burning in the Kimberly include fires at Fitzroy Crossing on Leopold Downs and Mount Elizabeth Station. In 2008, late-season wildfires burnt more than seven million hectares in the Kimberley.

Qld

On 14 October, bushfires burnt on the Gold Coast in southeast Queensland affecting the areas around Nerang and Pacific Pines. On 14 October, the Nerang Shopping Centre was evacuated when flames reached within metres of the surrounding carpark.

A large bushfire burnt during mid-October in the Mount Archer National Park area on the eastern outskirts of Rockhampton for several days, threatening the suburbs of Lakes Creek, Koongal and Frenchville. A house in Koongal was destroyed in the bushfire. On 15 October, a large grassfire burnt near the Gateway Motorway at Deagon in Brisbane's north and a fire at Toorbul jumped containment lines and began burning in a pine plantation.

NSW

In mid-October, bushfires burnt in the Clarence Valley. On 14 October 2009, one fire threatened the town of Brooms Head. The fire penetrated the settlement and threatened its only shop. Another four fires are burning in remote areas in the Clarence Valley. Nearby towns are currently advised to remain aware of bushfire activity in the area.

=== November ===
In very late October through much of November, a heat wave affected the south-eastern Australian states of South Australia, Victoria, Tasmania, New South Wales and Australian Capital Territory. This was the second major heatwave in the region within 10 months. On 19 November, strong winds and storms abated the heat wave and increased risk of bushfires.

Vic

On 10 November, three controlled burns in Victoria breached containment lines following wind gusts and high 30-degree temperatures, one 15 hectare fire in Point Nepean and two in Gippsland, one of which burnt over 1,000 hectares. On 20 November, a cool change brought strong winds and storms to much of the state causing damage to buildings and other structures. The high winds fanned several small bushfires including a 40-hectare fire at Dorodong, north-west of Casterton and a 180-hectare fire in the Cobboboonee National Park near Heywood in the state's south west.

SA

On 19 November, Around 20,000 lightning strikes occurred in South Australia as storms and cold fronts abated the November heat wave, Adelaide recording a temperature of 43. The strikes ignited over 100 fires across the state. Over 1,000 hectares have thus far been burnt on the Yorke Peninsula, where five people were injured when two CFS trucks collided in heavy smoke near Curramulka. Another firefighter near Kingston was injured in a separate incident. Over 2,000 personnel aided firefighting efforts across the state during these fires.

NSW

Dozens of fires ignited between 19 and 20 November were burning in north, central and western New South Wales, and on Sydney's northern outskirts. 1,000 personnel were deployed on the fire front, 2 homes were damaged and approximately 3,000 hectares burnt in NSW in total.

Tas

A number of bushfires near Swansea and St Helens on the east coast of Tasmania destroyed five houses, no one was injured.

=== December ===
NSW

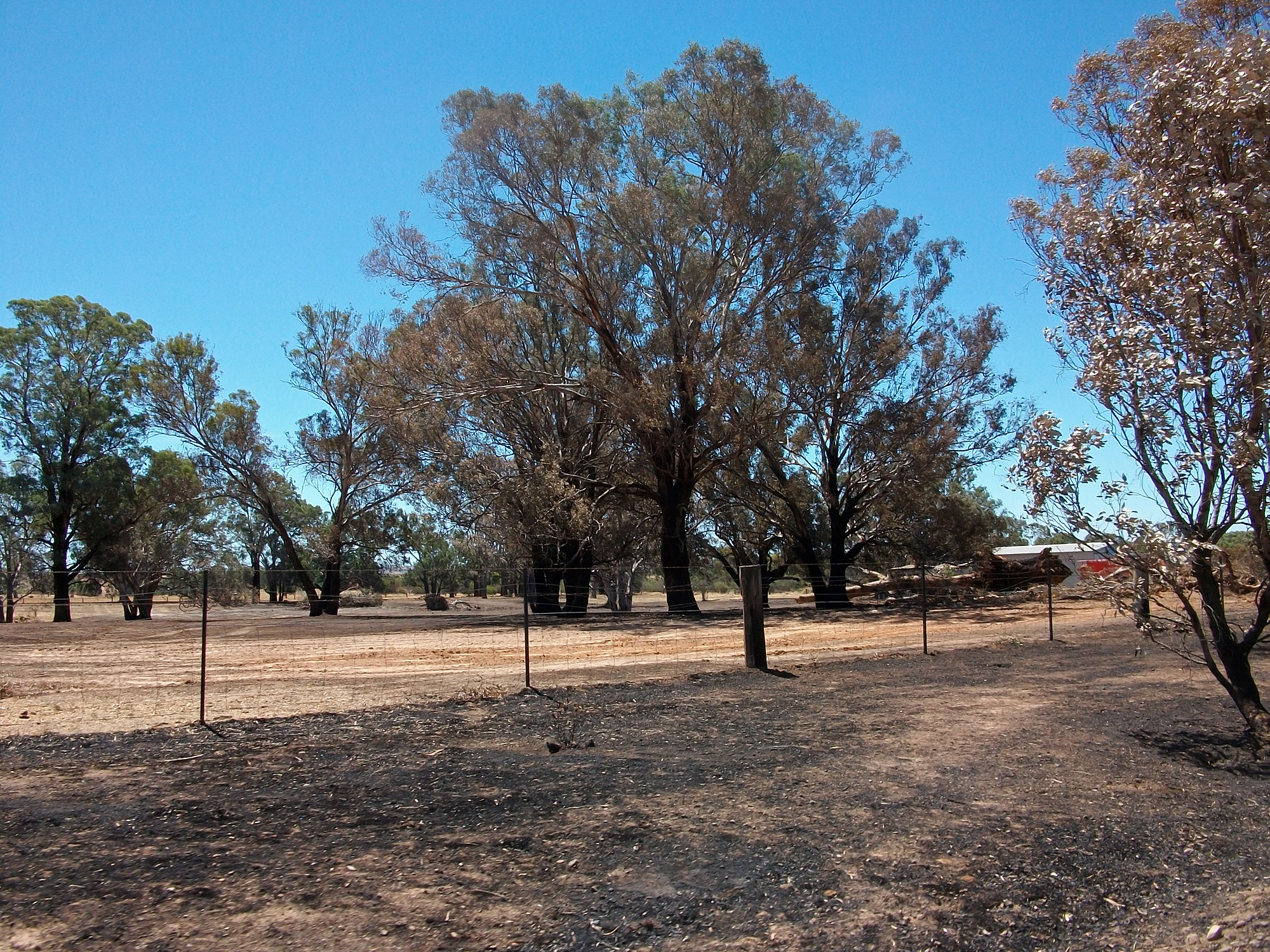
A field burnt during the Gregadoo bushfire, in southern New South Wales, December 2009

On 8 December, 90 fires were burning across New South Wales with 1,600 firefighters in attendance. A father and son suffered serious burns whilst defending property after a bushfire flared up in the central-west New South Wales town of Vittoria. Both were taken to Orange Base Hospital for treatment before being transferred to Concord Hospital in Sydney.

The same fire forced the closure of the Mitchell Highway, between Bathurst and Orange. Every region of NSW was under a high to catastrophic fire danger for 9 December and total fire bans remained in effect for the central ranges, northern slopes, northwestern and upper central west plains regions.

Between 9 and 10 December, 3 helicopters were involved in separate incidents fighting the fires. A helicopter mapping the fires crashed in dense fog into rainforest in the Donigo National Park at around noon, the pilot was taken to hospital in a critical but stable condition, whilst the passenger, a park ranger, died. Less than 24 hours later, two water-bombing helicopters collided tail rotors, forcing both to land, no one was injured.

Areas affected by the early December fires included; Vittoria, Wallendbeen, Cudgen and areas west of Tamworth. The Vittoria fire burnt around 2,000 hectares (4,940 acres), while the Diamond Swamp fire burnt around 7,000+.

On 17 December, bushfires affected Southern NSW including a major fire which has burnt 5,500 hectares (13,590 acres) in the Gerogery area, which is believed to have started at the Walla Walla tip. A 60-year-old man suffered burns to 36 per-cent of his body whilst fighting fire near Walla Walla, with a number of vehicles, home, sheds, crops and livestock also destroyed by the fire. The fire also forced the closure of the Main Southern railway line between Melbourne and Sydney and the Olympic Highway. In Tooma near Tumbarumba, a bushfire had burnt 11,500 hectares (28,420 acres) destroying six homes and threatening the Tooma Hotel and also the Kosciuszko National Park. Three men suffered burns and smoke inhalation while trying to fight the fire just outside the village of Tooma. In Michelago, 54 kilometres (34 mi) south of Canberra, a bushfire burnt 9,000 hectares (22,240 acres) and three houses were also destroyed. A powerline is believed to have caused a bushfire in Gregadoo, near Wagga Wagga, which burnt approximately 10 hectares (20 acres) of pasture, destroying a new shed and farm machinery. Wagga Wagga recorded a catastrophic fire danger index of 170, the highest recording in seven years, due to the low humidity, high temperatures and strong winds.

VIC

On 17 December, a bushfire burnt over 6,700 hectares in far east Gippsland, near Cann River. Victoria's first Emergency Warning message for the summer was issued to the towns of Cann River, Noorinbee and Tonghi Creek as these towns were under imminent threat of being directly impacted. However, later that evening, rain began to fall and put a dampener on the fire, thus reducing fire activity and ending the threat to the towns.

On 31 December, a small grassfire started at approximately 4:45pm (AEDT) at Mount Clear near Ballarat.

SA

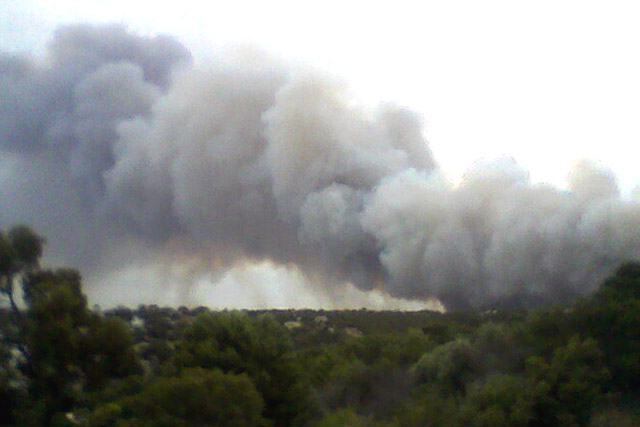
Smoke from the Port Lincoln bushfire on 23 December 2009

On 23 December, a bushfire burnt land around Port Lincoln, destroying several structures including the State Emergency Service Headquarters and six houses. The fire also cut power to approximately 6,000 properties after burning through the main power lines.

WA

An unauthorised campfire in state forest was thought to start a bushfire that began 13 December 2009 about 17 km East of Harvey The smoke from the fire later smothered Perth and other places along the Swan Coastal Plain in haze on 14 December until cleared by the sea breeze. Over 100 personnel were involved in combating the blaze including dozens of firefighters. FESA issued warnings to residents of Harvey and Dwellingup and many roads were closed. A total area of 9700ha was burnt but no private property was destroyed.

On 29 December, following the state's first use of the "catastrophic" fire risk alert, temperatures in areas to the north and east of Perth passed 45 °C (113 °F) and a large bushfire started at 1pm AWST near the town of Toodyay, 85 kilometres (53 mi) north-east of Perth. The fire destroyed 37 homes and about 3,000 hectares (7,410 acres) of bushland. The fire continued into 30 December and was declared a natural disaster by the Premier, Colin Barnett. Two firefighters were treated for smoke inhalation and dehydration, with the Fire and Emergency Services Authority of Western Australia (FESA) also reported that it had believed that a resident was being treated for burns at the Royal Perth Hospital.

A large bushfire was also reported at Badgingarra, about 200 kilometres (124 mi) north of Perth.

=== January (2010) ===
In early January, a string of hot days with strong northerly winds were predicted for many areas of Victoria, South Australia and Tasmania, to present the highest bushfire risk since Black Saturday. Catastrophic and Extreme fire danger warnings across most regions in each state and it was the first time the new "Catastrophic" fire danger rating category was used in Victoria.

WA

On 3 January, a bushfire threatened homes in the Swan Valley suburb of Brigadoon, 36 kilometres (22 mi) north-east of Perth.

VIC

On 8 January, a 26-year-old St Kilda man was seen trying to set fire to a park bench in the Sherbrooke State Forest in the Dandenong Ranges, 35 km east of Melbourne, just before 9.00am. He was later arrested on suspicion of attempted arson. Another man was accused of arson after it was alleged he started two fires in Templestowe, an eastern suburb of Melbourne, less than 500m from houses.

On 10 January, a CFA volunteer firefighter was killed and 2 other CFA personnel seriously injured when a CFA fire truck carrying 5 personnel rolled on Spring Creek Road at Tatong, whilst en route to a controlled burn near Mansfield, in Victoria's north-east, shortly before 6:30 am. The cause of the crash is yet to be determined.

On 11 January, the 'Catastrophic (Code Red)' fire danger rating was used for the first time in the state for 2010, in the Wimmera Region, prompting many residents to evacuate the town of Halls Gap whilst most other regions were classified as at 'Extreme' risk. Temperatures across much of the state exceeded 40 degrees, surpassing 43 in Melbourne, combined with strong northerly winds.

On 12 January, a fire near Cann River in East Gippsland, broke containment lines. On 13 January, support personnel arrived from North America, taking Victoria's total fire fighting personnel on standby to 66,000.

On 22 January, a lightning strike was suspected to have started a bushfire in the Grampians National Park, which had burnt 11,000 hectare and threatening the town of Dadswells Bridge and is also expected to impact on Ledcourt and Heatherlie.

SA

On 11 January, Catastrophic fire danger warnings were issued across southern parts of the state. Mid-morning, a fire threatened areas in the northern suburbs of Adelaide, water bombers were called in to provide support to ground crews.

NSW

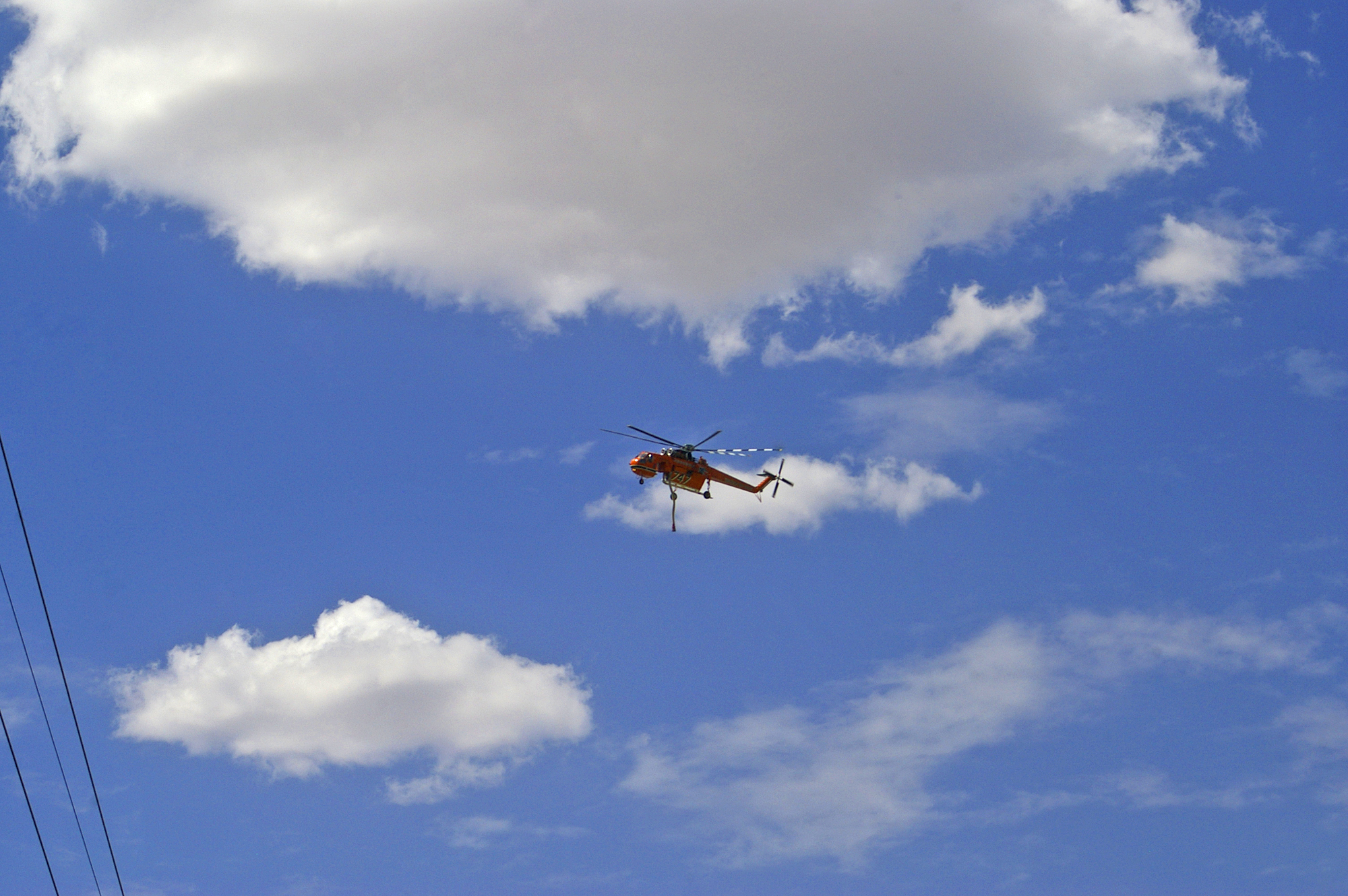
Erickson Air-Crane "Delilah" near Wagga Wagga, 12 January 2010

On 12 January, Catastrophic fire danger warnings were issued across south western parts of the state. Mid-afternoon, a bushfire broke out on Bakers Lane on the northern side of the disused Tumbarumba railway line in Gumly Gumly, 8 kilometres (5.0 mi) from the CBD of Wagga Wagga. The New South Wales Rural Fire Service, New South Wales Fire Brigades with support from aircraft including the Erickson Air-Crane "Delilah" contained the fire an hour later after burning approximately 35 hectares of grassland. The fire is believed to have started on the side of the road (Bakers Lane) however cause of the fire is currently under investigation by the New South Wales Police fire investigators, however, the cause is suspected to be arson.

On 23 January, a bushfire caused by a lightning strike near Wog Way in the South East Forest National Park, the fire was contained on 27 January after it had burnt 459 hectares.

=== February ===
NSW

On 2 February, a bushfire burnt 536 hectares, which broke out on a property called "The Hill" on the Burra Road at Reno near Gundagai. The New South Wales Rural Fire Service feared the fire could threaten other properties however the fire was brought under control at approximately 10pm. The cause of the fire is under investigation but its believed fallen power lines may have caused the blaze.

=== March ===
WA

On 12 March, 200ha of land was burnt in Coolup to the south of Pinjarra just after 3pm, $15,000 worth of damage was done to a property in the township.

The following day a bushfire warning was declared for Albany as flames of up to 10 metres (33 ft) high threaten the suburb of Little Grove The suburbs of Robinson and Little Grove were evacuated as a result of the bushfire. The fire started after a motorcycle accident and quickly spread through the surrounding bushland. Fire fighters battled flames using two water bombers and a helicopter. The fire was eventually contained following overnight rain.
