= Coldstream (disambiguation) =

Coldstream is a burgh in the Scottish Borders on the northern shore of River Tweed.

Coldstream may also refer to:

- Coldstream (ship), one of several ships
- Coldstream, Victoria, near Melbourne, Australia
- Coldstream, an area near Tyndale, New South Wales, Australia
  - Coldstream River, a watercourse of the Clarence River catchment in the Northern Rivers district
- Coldstream, Kentucky, USA
- Coldstream, Ohio, USA
- Coldstream, British Columbia, Canada
- Coldstream, Ontario, Canada
- Coldstream, New Brunswick, Canada
  - Cold Stream, a tributary of Becaguimec Stream in New Brunswick, Canada
- Coldstream, Nova Scotia, Canada
- Coldstream, Eastern Cape, South Africa

Coldstream is also a surname. Notable people with the surname include:

- Sir George Coldstream (1907–2004), British barrister and civil servant
- John Coldstream (1806–1863), Scottish physician
- Nicola Coldstream (born 1942), British architectural historian
- Nicolas Coldstream (1927–2008), English archaeologist and academic
- Rosemary Coldstream, New Zealand-born garden designer
- William Coldstream (1908–1987), English realist painter

== See also ==
- Coldstream Guards, the oldest regular regiment in continuous service in the British Army
