= Woombah, New South Wales =

Woombah
- Town
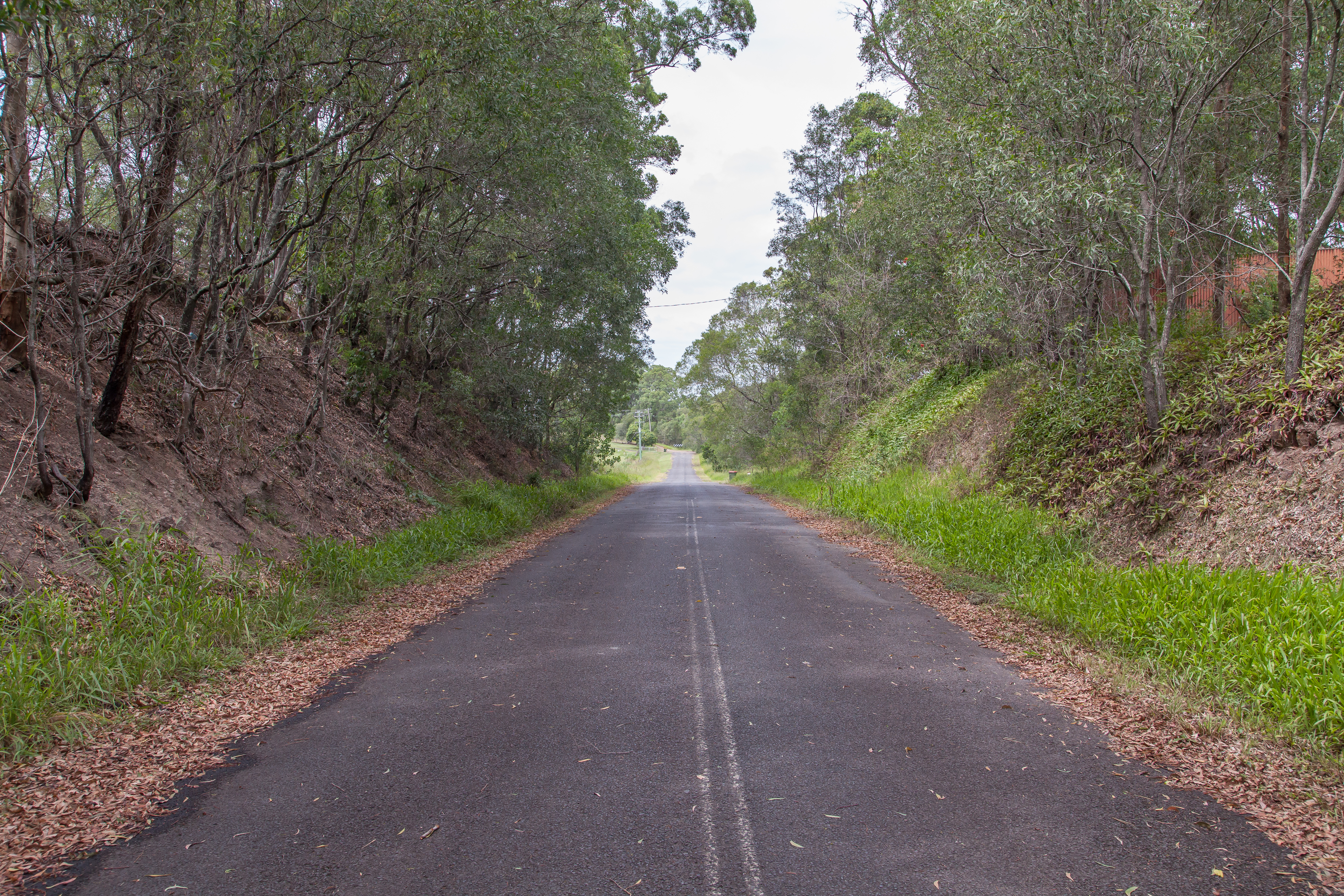
- Old Pacific Highway in Woombah

- Coordinates: 29°21′22″S 153°16′37″E
- Country: Australia
- State: New South Wales
- LGA: Clarence Valley Council
- Established: 1830

Government
  - State electorate: Clarence
  - Federal division: Cowper
- Elevation: 26.3 m (86 ft)

Population
  - Total: 935 (2021 census)
- Postcode: 2469
- Mean max temp: 23.9 °C (75.0 °F)
- Mean min temp: 15.9 °C (60.6 °F)
- Annual rainfall: 1,429 mm (56.3 in)

Woombah is a small but growing bushland village in Clarence Valley, New South Wales, Australia. This hamlet is located to the south of the World Heritage-listed Bundjalung National Park, near the Port of Yamba on Goodwood Island, and 15 minutes from the fishing village of Iluka, New South Wales.

== History ==
There is a significant Aboriginal site at Woombah, one of five in the Lower Clarence area. The north arm of the Clarence River at Woombah forms the border between the Bundjalung tribe to the north and the Yaegl peoples to the south.

The first Europeans settled in Woombah in 1830, establishing a timber industry.

== Name ==
An Aboriginal name for the star Canopus is womba, meaning the "Mad Star". However this is a word from the Euahlayi people located in north-central New South Wales and south-central Queensland, and whilst unsure of its origin there is a general acceptance that Woombah means 'crazy star'.

== Geography ==
Woombah is about 650 kilometres (650 km) north of Sydney, Australia and 260km south of Brisbane, Australia and is situated near Australia's South Pacific Coastline. The town lies within Australia's Clarence Valley in what’s known as the Northern Rivers area of NSW, near the mouth of the Clarence River at an elevation of 86 feet (26 m).

== Caravan Parks ==
There are several caravan parks located in Woombah:

- Woombah Woods Caravan Park
- Bimbimbi Riverside Caravan Park
- Browns Rocks Caravan Park

== Attractions ==
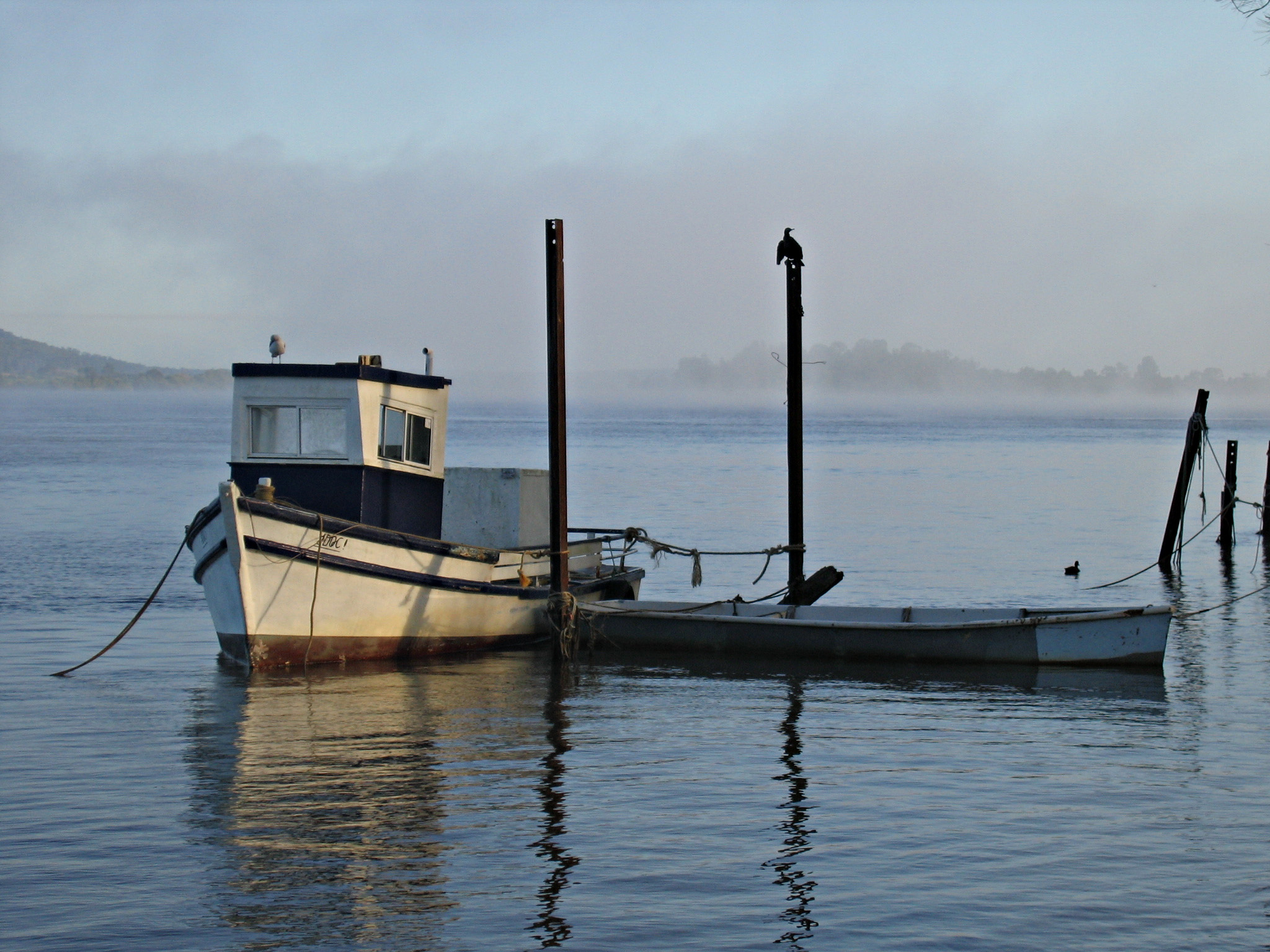
Fishing on the Clarence River

Woombah is located on the North Arm of the popular fishing Clarence River. The North Arm of the Clarence River includes flathead, whiting, bream and mud crabs.

Local attractions in Woombah also include a coffee plantation which is home to one of the world's southern-most coffee plantations, "Woombah Coffee Plantation".

Other attractions include an old schoolhouse and a number of artist studio galleries.

Woombah is also located adjacent to Bundjalung National Park.

Activities include beach walking, fishing, mountain biking and camping.

== Demographics ==
2021 Estimated Population Data by Gender/Age

- 50.2% Female
- 49.8% Male
- 56.0 Median Age

2021 Registered Marital Status

- Married 50.3%
- Never Married 25.7%
- Divorced 12.9%
- Widowed 6.7%
- Separated 3.7%

2021 Religious affiliation

- No Religion 43.2%
- Anglican 19.9%
- Catholic 14.4%
- Not Stated 9.2%
- Uniting Church 4.3%

2021 Languages Spoken at Home

- English 90.2%
- Filipino 0.4%
- French 0.4%
- Dutch 0.4%
- Japanese 0.3%

2021 Indigenous status

- Non-Indigenous 89.1%
- Indigenous status not stated 7.3%
- Aboriginal and/or Torres Strait Islander 3.5%

== Transportation ==
Buses run through Woombah with bus stops located along Iluka Road. The nearest airport is Clarence Valley Regional Airport (YGFN) in Grafton offering daily flights to Sydney.

== Newspapers ==
The Clarence Valley Independent

== Weather ==
The climate is warm and temperate in Woombah. Woombah has a significant amount of rainfall during the year. This is true even for the driest month. According to the Köppen climate classification, this climate is classified as Cfa which is a humid subtropical climate.

Climate data for Yamba Pilot Station (1991–2020)
Month	Jan	Feb	Mar	Apr	May	Jun	Jul	Aug	Sep	Oct	Nov	Dec	Year
Record high °C (°F)	42.5 (108.5)	41.5 (106.7)	34.7 (94.5)	32.8 (91.0)	29.4 (84.9)	28.1 (82.6)	27.3 (81.1)	36.1 (97.0)	35.7 (96.3)	37.5 (99.5)	38.3 (100.9)	39.9 (103.8)	42.5 (108.5)
Mean maximum °C (°F)	27.3 (81.1)	27.3 (81.1)	26.4 (79.5)	24.5 (76.1)	22.2 (72.0)	20.2 (68.4)	19.8 (67.6)	20.9 (69.6)	22.8 (73.0)	23.9 (75.0)	25.1 (77.2)	26.2 (79.2)	23.9 (75.0)
Daily mean °C (°F)	25.6 (78.1)	25.7 (78.3)	24.7 (76.5)	22.8 (73.0)	20.6 (69.1)	18.8 (65.8)	18.3 (64.9)	19.0 (66.2)	20.6 (69.1)	21.5 (70.7)	23.0 (73.4)	24.3 (75.7)	22.1 (71.7)
Mean daily minimum °C (°F)	20.7 (69.3)	20.8 (69.4)	19.5 (67.1)	16.8 (62.2)	13.6 (56.5)	11.4 (52.5)	10.2 (50.4)	10.8 (51.4)	13.6 (56.5)	15.8 (60.4)	17.8 (64.0)	19.5 (67.1)	15.9 (60.6)
Record low °C (°F)	14.5 (58.1)	14.5 (58.1)	13.4 (56.1)	7.2 (45.0)	5.7 (42.3)	5.0 (41.0)	4.6 (40.3)	4.8 (40.6)	6.2 (43.2)	6.7 (44.1)	10.0 (50.0)	12.6 (54.7)	4.6 (40.3)
Average precipitation mm (inches)	133.9 (5.27)	160.7 (6.33)	203.6 (8.02)	141.9 (5.59)	138.3 (5.44)	162.7 (6.41)	78.5 (3.09)	65.4 (2.57)	43.9 (1.73)	81.2 (3.20)	105.4 (4.15)	113.7 (4.48)	1,429 (56.26)
Average precipitation days (≥ 1 mm)	12.7	14.8	17.2	14.4	13.4	12.5	10.1	8.0	9.1	10.6	12.0	12.8	147.6
Average afternoon relative humidity (%)	73	73	71	69	66	64	61	59	64	69	71	72	68
