= Wooli Wooli River =

River in New South Wales, Australia

Coordinates: 29°58′S 153°09′E

Location
- Country: Australia
- State: New South Wales
- Region: NSW North Coast (IBRA), Northern Rivers
- Local government area: Clarence Valley

Physical characteristics
- Source: Coastal Range
  - location: Newfoundland State Forest, near Red Rock
  - elevation: 134 m (440 ft)
- Mouth: Coral Sea, South Pacific Ocean
  - location: near Wooli
  - elevation: 0 m (0 ft)
- Length: 34 km (21 mi)
- Basin size: 180 km^{2} (69 sq mi)

Basin features
- Tributaries
  - right: Barcoongere River
- National park: Yuraygir NP

Wooli Wooli River, an open and trained mature wave dominated, barrier estuary, is located in the Northern Rivers region of New South Wales, Australia.

== Course and features ==
Wooli Wooli River rises on the eastern slopes of the Coastal Range within the Newfoundland State Forest and northwest of Red Rock, and flows generally north, east, and then south, before reaching its mouth at the Coral Sea of the South Pacific Ocean south of Wooli, descending 135 metres (443 ft) over its 34 kilometres (21 mi) course.

== See also ==
- Rivers of New South Wales
- List of rivers of Australia
