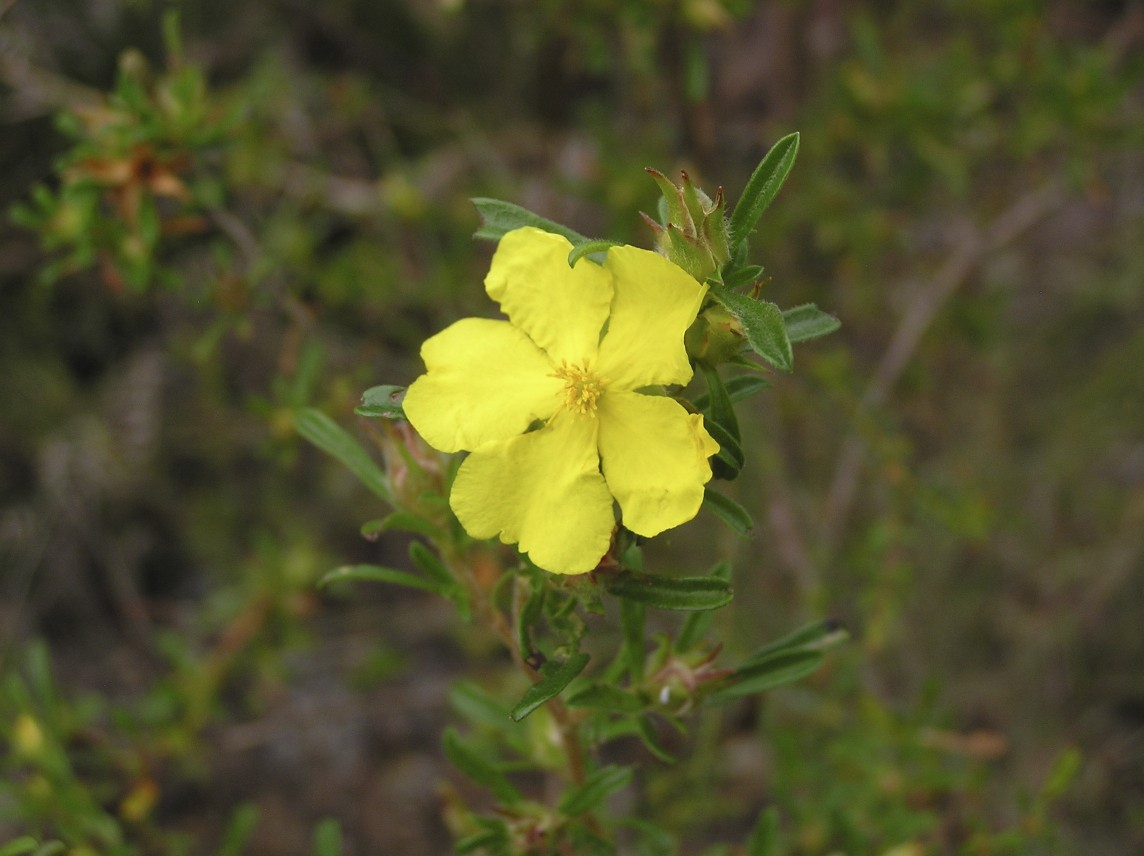
- In Bundjalung National Park

Scientific classification
- Kingdom: Plantae
- Clade: Tracheophytes
- Clade: Angiosperms
- Clade: Eudicots
- Order: Dilleniales
- Family: Dilleniaceae
- Genus: Hibbertia
- Species: H. acuminata

Binomial name
- Hibbertia acuminata B.J.Conn

= Hibbertia acuminata =

Species of flowering plant

Hibbertia acuminata is a species of flowering plant in the family Dilleniaceae and is endemic to eastern Australia. It is an erect shrub with lance-shaped to egg-shaped, stem-clasping leaves and yellow flowers arranged singly in leaf axils with about forty stamens surrounding the carpels.

== Description ==
Hibbertia acuminata is usually an erect shrub that typically grows to a height of up to 0.3–1 m (1 ft 0 in – 3 ft 3 in), its young growth hairy. The leaves are lance-shaped to egg-shaped with the narrower end towards the base, 10–30 mm (0.39–1.18 in) long and 3–8 mm (0.12–0.31 in) wide, sometimes with a pointed tip. The flowers are arranged singly in leaf axils with a bract 3–4 mm (0.12–0.16 in) long. The sepals are 8–10 mm (0.31–0.39 in) long and more or less membranous. The petals are yellow, 7–10 mm (0.28–0.39 in) long and there are about forty stamens surrounding the three glabrous carpels. Flowering occurs from July to November.

== Taxonomy ==
Hibbertia acuminata was first formally described in 1990 by Barry Conn in the journal Muelleria from specimens collected by William Blakely and David Shiress near Copmanhurst in 1922. The specific epithet (acuminata) means "pointed", referring to the sepals.

== Distribution and habitat ==
This hibbertia grows in scattered locations in coastal heath and forest ranges on sandstone. It is found between Coffs Harbour and south-eastern Queensland, mostly commonly on the Richmond Range.

== See also ==
- List of Hibbertia species
