= Mororo, New South Wales =

Mororo New South Wales
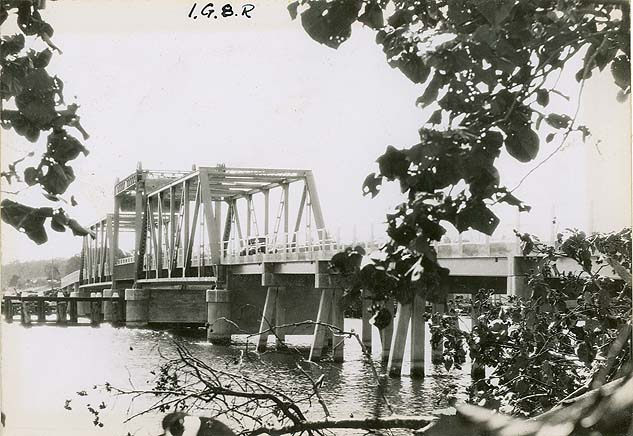

- Coordinates: 29.3405°S 153.2101°E
- Population: 115 (2021)
- Postcode(s): 2469
- LGA(s): Clarence Valley Council
- State electorate(s): Clarence
- Federal division(s): Page

Mororo is a Locality in the Clarence Valley of New South Wales in Australia. Mororo is dominated by sugar cane farms & does not have a large area of suburbia. The population of Mororo is 115. It is located on the Pacific Motorway and is located in the Bundjalung National Park. Mororo has three residential roads, Banana Road, Lewis Lane, and Mororo Road. It is close to Woombah, Iluka, Maclean, Yamba and Woodburn.
