= Waterview, New South Wales =

Rual locality of Grafton, News South Wales

Waterview New South Wales
- Coordinates: 29.6908°S 152.9042°E
- Population: 90 (2021)
- Postcode(s): 2460
- Elevation: 4 m (13 ft)
- Time zone: AEST (UTC+10:00)
  - Summer (DST): AEDT (UTC+11:00)
- Location: 7 km (4 mi) W of Grafton
- LGA(s): Clarence Valley Council
- Region: Northern Rivers
- State electorate(s): Clarence
- Federal division(s): Page

Waterview is a small rural locality in the Northern Rivers region of New South Wales, Australia. It is situated approximately 7 kilometres west of Grafton along the Gwydir Highway its located right before the bigger neighbouring locality of Waterview Heights.

== Demographics ==
The 2021 census, Waterview has a population of 90.

The 2016 census, Waterview had a population of 79.

== Transport ==
The locality is accessible from South Grafton via the Gwydir Highway which is the only main road that runs through. The nearest airport is located the Clarence Valley Regional Airport. Busways operates two routes that stop at the one bustop in Waterview from Grafton to Jackadgery/Cangai and to Copmanhurst.
