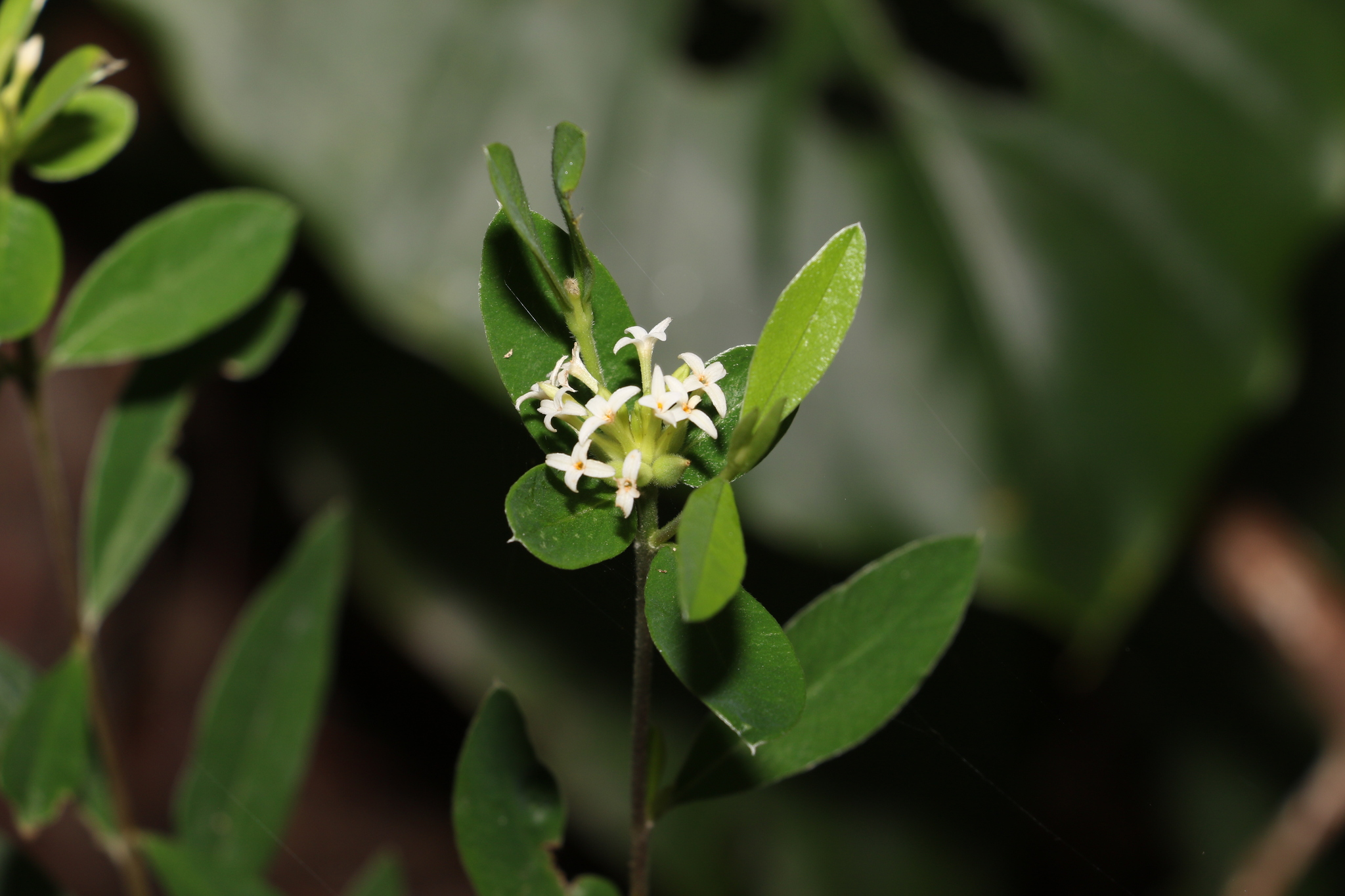
- Near Goonengerry

Scientific classification
- Kingdom: Plantae
- Clade: Tracheophytes
- Clade: Angiosperms
- Clade: Eudicots
- Clade: Rosids
- Order: Malvales
- Family: Thymelaeaceae
- Genus: Pimelea
- Species: P. gigandra

Binomial name
- Pimelea gigandra A.R.Bean

= Pimelea gigandra =

Species of shrub

Pimelea gigandra is a species of flowering plant in the family Thymelaeaceae and is endemic to eastern Australia. It is a shrub with densely hairy young stems, elliptic leaves and heads of 10 to 19 white, tube-shaped flowers.

== Description ==
Pimelea gigandra is a perennial, gynodioecious shrub that typically grows to a height of 0.5–3 m (1 ft 8 in – 9 ft 10 in) and has densely hairy young stems. The leaves are arranged more or less in opposite pairs, elliptic, 33–82 mm (1.3–3.2 in) long and 11–23 mm (0.43–0.91 in) wide, on a petiole 1.8–3 mm (0.071–0.118 in) long. The upper surface of the leaves is sparsely hairy and the lower surface is sparsely to densely hairy. The flowers are borne on the ends of branches in heads of 10 to 19 on a densely hairy rachis 2.0–3.5 mm (0.079–0.138 in) long, the peduncle 1–3 mm (0.039–0.118 in) long, each flower on a pedicel 0.5–0.8 mm (0.020–0.031 in) long. The floral tube is 8.5–11 mm (0.33–0.43 in) long and white, the sepals 3.1–4.0 mm (0.12–0.16 in) long and hairy on the outside. Flowering occurs throughout the year.

== Taxonomy ==
Pimelea gigandra was first formally described in 2017 by Anthony Bean in the journal Austrobaileya from specimens collected in Lamington National Park in 2016. The specific epithet (gigandra) is derived from Greek words meaning "large" or "giant" and "man" or "male", referring to the anthers that are larger than those of similar species.

== Distribution and habitat ==
This pimelea is only known from near Mount Tamborine in south-east Queensland to Mororo in north-eastern New South Wales, where it grows in tall open forest and on the edges of rainforest.
