= Waterview Heights, New South Wales =

Rual locality of Grafton, News South Wales

Waterview Heights
- Suburb
- Interactive map of Waterview Heights
- Coordinates: 29.70238°S 152.83823°E
- Country: Australia
- State: New South Wales
- Region: Northern Rivers
- LGA: Clarence Valley Council
- Location: 10 km (6.2 mi) W of Grafton

Government
  - State electorate: Clarence
  - Federal division: Page

Area
  - Total: 58.332 km^{2} (22.522 sq mi)
- Elevation: 37 m (121 ft)

Population
  - Total: 1,364 (2021)
  - Density: 23.383/km^{2} (60.563/sq mi)
- Time zone: UTC+10:00 (AEST)
  - Summer (DST): UTC+11:00 (AEDT)
- Postcode: 2460..

Waterview Heights is a rural locality in the Northern Rivers region of New South Wales, Australia. It is situated approximately 10 kilometres west of Grafton along the Gwydir Highway.

== Geography ==
Waterview Heights covers an area of 58.332 square kilometres. The locality is characterised by a mix of open rural landscapes and bushland, with a low population density.

== Demographics ==
According to the 2021 census, Waterview Heights has a population of 1,364 people. The urban centre of Waterview Heights has a population of 872.

According to the 2016 census, Waterview Heights had a population of 1,325. According to the 2011 census, Waterview Heights had a population of 1,384.

== Transport ==
The locality is accessible from South Grafton via the Gwydir Highway and is serviced by regional roads Rogan Bridge Road to the north and Old Glen Innes Road. The nearest airport is located the Clarence Valley Regional Airport. Busways operates two routes stopping in Waterview Heights from Grafton to Jackadgery/Cangai and to Copmanhurst
