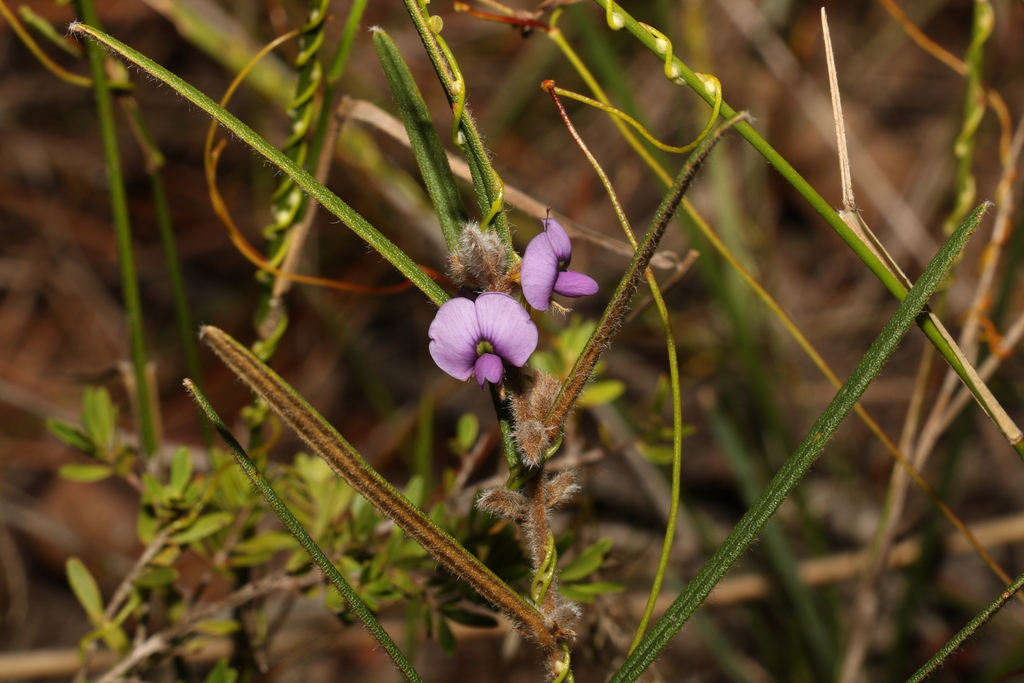

Scientific classification
- Kingdom: Plantae
- Clade: Tracheophytes
- Clade: Angiosperms
- Clade: Eudicots
- Clade: Rosids
- Order: Fabales
- Family: Fabaceae
- Subfamily: Faboideae
- Genus: Hovea
- Species: H. ramulosa

Binomial name
- Hovea ramulosa A.Cunn. ex Lindl.

Synonyms
- Hovea longifolia var. pannosa (A.Cunn. ex Hook.) Benth. p.p.; Hovea longifolia var. rosmarinifolia (A.Cunn.) Benth.; Hovea pannosa auct. non A.Cunn. ex Hook.f.: Ross, J.H. in Walsh, N.G. & Entwisle, T.J. (ed.) (1996)

= Hovea ramulosa =

Species of legume

Hovea ramulosa is a species of flowering plant in the family Fabaceae and is endemic to eastern Australia. It is an upright shrub with narrowly linear to linear leaves, mauve flowers and more or less round pods.

== Description ==
Hovea ramulosa is a shrub that typically grows to a height of up to 2.2 m (7 ft 3 in) high with slender stems and many parts densely covered with spreading, coiled greyish hairs. The leaves are narrowly linear to linear, 35–90 mm (1.4–3.5 in) long and 2.2–5 mm (0.087–0.197 in) wide, strongly arched each side of a moderately recessed midrib, with the edges rolled under. The leaf upper surface of the leaves is dull green and glabrous, the lower surface mostly obscured by curled orange-brown and grey-white hairs. The flowers are usually borne in sessile pairs, with narrowly egg-shaped to lance-shaped bracts 0.7–1.0 mm (0.028–0.039 in) long above the base of the pedicel and lance-shaped bracteoles 1.5–3 mm (0.059–0.118 in) long at the base of the sepals. The sepals are 4.5–5.5 mm (0.18–0.22 in) long and form a tube 2.0–2.8 mm (0.079–0.110 in) long. The standard petal is mauve, about 8 mm (0.31 in) long and 10–12 mm (0.39–0.47 in) wide, with a yellow centre, the wings 7–8 mm (0.28–0.31 in) long and 3.5–4.0 mm (0.14–0.16 in) wide, and the keel 4.5–7 mm (0.18–0.28 in) long and 2.0–2.2 mm (0.079–0.087 in) wide. Flowering occurs from July to August, and the fruit is a more or less round pod, about 10 mm (0.39 in) long and wide with an elliptic, mottled red-brown seed with an oblong aril 4.8 mm (0.19 in) long and 1.2 mm (0.047 in) wide.

== Taxonomy and naming ==
Hovea ramulosa was first formally described in 1843 by John Lindley in Sydenham Edwards Edwards's Botanical Register from an unpublished description by Allan Cunningham of specimens he collected "along the upper branches of the Brisbane River in Moreton Bay, in the year 1829". The specific epithet (ramulosa) means "bearing branchlets".

== Distribution and habitat ==
This species of hovea grows in sandy soils derived from sandstone and is found in woodland from Helidon and Beenleigh in far south-eastern Queensland to near Copmanhurst and Grafton in New South Wales.

== Conservation status ==
Hovea ramulosa is listed as of "least concern" under the Queensland Government Nature Conservation Act 1992.
