= Coldstream River =

Coordinates: 29°44′S 153°05′E

Location
- Country: Australia
- State: New South Wales
- IBRA: NSW North Coast
- District: Northern Rivers
- Local government area: Clarence Valley

Physical characteristics
- Source: Below Glenugie Peak
  - location: near Brown Knob Trigonometric Station
  - elevation: 32 m (105 ft)
- Mouth: confluence with the South Arm of the Clarence River
  - location: near Tyndale
  - elevation: 0.326 m (1 ft 0.8 in)
- Length: 43 km (27 mi)

Basin features
- River system: Clarence River catchment
- National park: Yuraygir National Park

Coldstream River, a watercourse of the Clarence River catchment, is located in the Northern Rivers district of New South Wales, Australia.

== Course and features ==
Coldstream River rises below Glenugie Peak, near Brown Knob Trigonometric Station and flows generally north by east, before reaching its confluence with the South Arm of the Clarence River, near Tyndale, descending 32 metres (105 ft) over its 43 kilometres (27 mi) course as it flows through Yuraygir National Park and past the village of Tucabia.

== See also ==
- Rivers of New South Wales
