= Waterview =

Waterview may refer to:

- Waterview, Kentucky, United States
- Waterview, Maryland, United States
- Waterview, New Zealand
- Waterview, Queensland, Australia
- Waterview, New South Wales, Australia
