= Tyndale, New South Wales =

Locality in New South Wales

Tyndale
- Town
- Interactive map of Tyndale
- Coordinates: 29.56°S 153.158°E
- Country: Australia
- State: New South Wales
- LGA: Clarence Valley Council
- Location: 630 km (390 mi) north of Sydney; 28 km (17 mi) northeast of Grafton

Government
  - State electorate: Clarence
  - Federal division: Page

Population
  - Total: 190 (SAL 2021)
Localities around Tyndale
South Arm	Woodford Island	Gulmarrad
Cowper	Tyndale	Shark Creek
Coldstream	Tucabia	Pillar Valley

Tyndale is a locality in the Northern Rivers region of New South Wales. The locality is bounded on the west by the lower reaches of the Coldstream River, then downstream of its confluence, Tyndale is on the south (right) bank of the South Arm of the Clarence River. Since 2020, the Pacific Highway traverses south–north through the locality, bypassing east of the town. The former alignment is now called the Big River Way, adjacent to the town and river.

Tyndale had a school which opened in 1868 and closed in 1975. A weatherboard church was opened on 21 August 1881. The town has a motel, caravan park and roadhouse serving tourists at the southern end of the sugar cane fields.
