= Lawrence Road railway station =

Former railway station in New South Wales, Australia

Lawrence Road

General information
- Location: Lawrence Road, New South Wales; Australia
- Coordinates: 29.3957°S 153.0096°E
- Operator: Department of Railways
- Line: North Coast
- Distance: 739.480 km (459.492 mi) from Central
- Platforms: 1 (1 side)

Construction
- Structure type: Ground

Other information
- Status: Demolished

History
- Opened: 6 November 1905
- Closed: 13 June 1970

Services
Preceding station	Former services	Following station
Banyabba towards Brisbane	North Coast Line	Gurranang towards Maitland
Location

Lawrence Road railway station was a railway station on the North Coast line, serving the locality of Lawrence Road in northern New South Wales, Australia. The station was opened on 6 November 1905 and closed in 1970 and served a pastoral area. It has incorrectly been referred to as Lawrance Road.
