= Palmers Island, New South Wales =

Town in New South Wales, Australia

Palmers Island New South Wales
- Coordinates: 29.42029°S 153.28868°E
- Population: 482 (2021 census)
  - Density: 13.843/km^{2} (35.85/sq mi)
- Postcode(s): 2463
- Area: 34.82 km^{2} (13.4 sq mi)
- LGA(s): Clarence Valley Council
- State electorate(s): Clarence
- Federal division(s): Page

Palmers Island is a small town and second largest Island on the Clarence River in north-eastern New South Wales, Australia. It is situated directly across the river from the resort town of Yamba. At the 2021 census, Palmers Island had a population of 482 people. It is located 8 km from Yamba and 55 km from Grafton.

== Schools ==
The Palmers Island Public School serving the location of Palmers Island is a historic school that has existed on the island since 1866.

== Newspapers ==
The local newspaper is the Clarence Valley Independent which services the whole of the Clarence Valley.
