= Coffee rock =

Type of geologic formation in Australia

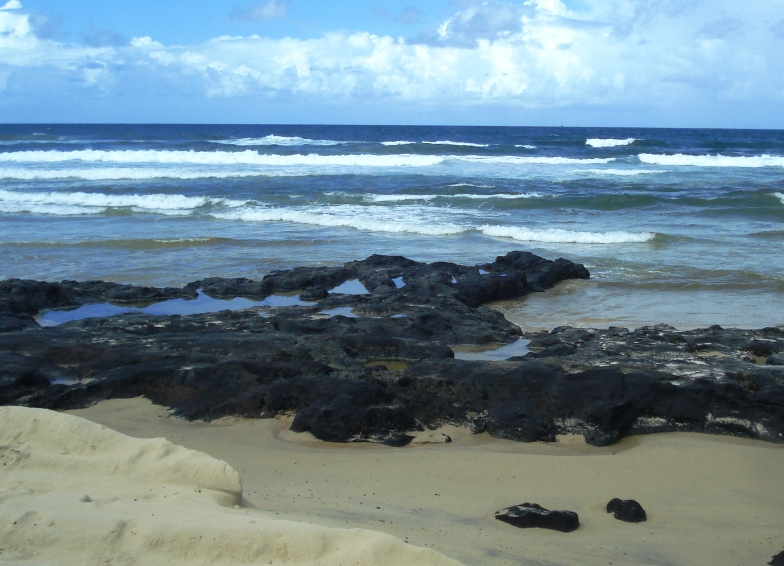
Coffee rock on K'Gari.

Coffee rock is the common name for dark brown, brittle rock-like formations that are made of sand weakly cemented together with decayed vegetation from soil.

Coffee rock has been exposed by coastal weathering process on the beaches of Broadwater and Bundjalung National Parks in New South Wales, Australia. In addition, exposures can be seen in North Queensland, Australia at Kurrimine Beach, and in South East Queensland on K'gari and at the entry to Coonowrin Lake in Caloundra.

Exposed Coffee Rock on the beaches Fraser Island is more likely the beds of old lakes in the sand dunes when the sea level was lower and one of the most well known sites of it on the island is at Bowarrady Creek. In places it is peat-like and embedded with wood ranging from small twigs to large tree trunks up to 1200mm in diameter, with some evidence of fire on the wood before being assembled.
