= Goodwood Island =

Island in New South Wales, Australia

Coordinates: 29.378°S 153.308°E

Goodwood Island is an island situated between the main channel of the Clarence River and the river's north Arm near Iluka and Woombah, New South Wales Australia. It has a large wharf at the Port of Yamba where ocean traders collect cargo to take to New Zealand, Lord Howe Island and Norfolk Island.

The island is home to a museum, called the Shed Gallery, which features photographs and other objects related to the sugar industry in northern New South Wales.

== See also ==
- List of islands of Australia
