= Kungala, New South Wales =

Kungala New South Wales
- Coordinates: 29°57′S 153°01′E
- Population: 145 (SAL 2016)
- Postcode(s): 2460
- LGA(s): Clarence Valley Council
- State electorate(s): Clarence
- Federal division(s): Page

Kungala is a locality south of Grafton in northern New South Wales, Australia. The North Coast railway passes through, and a railway station and sidings were provided from 1915 to 1974. At the 2006 census, Kungala had a population of 205 people. The town's name is derived from an aboriginal term meaning "to shout and listen".

Preceding station	Former services	Following station
Lanitza towards Brisbane	North Coast Line	Glenreagh towards Maitland
