= Shark Creek, New South Wales =

Shark Creek
- Town
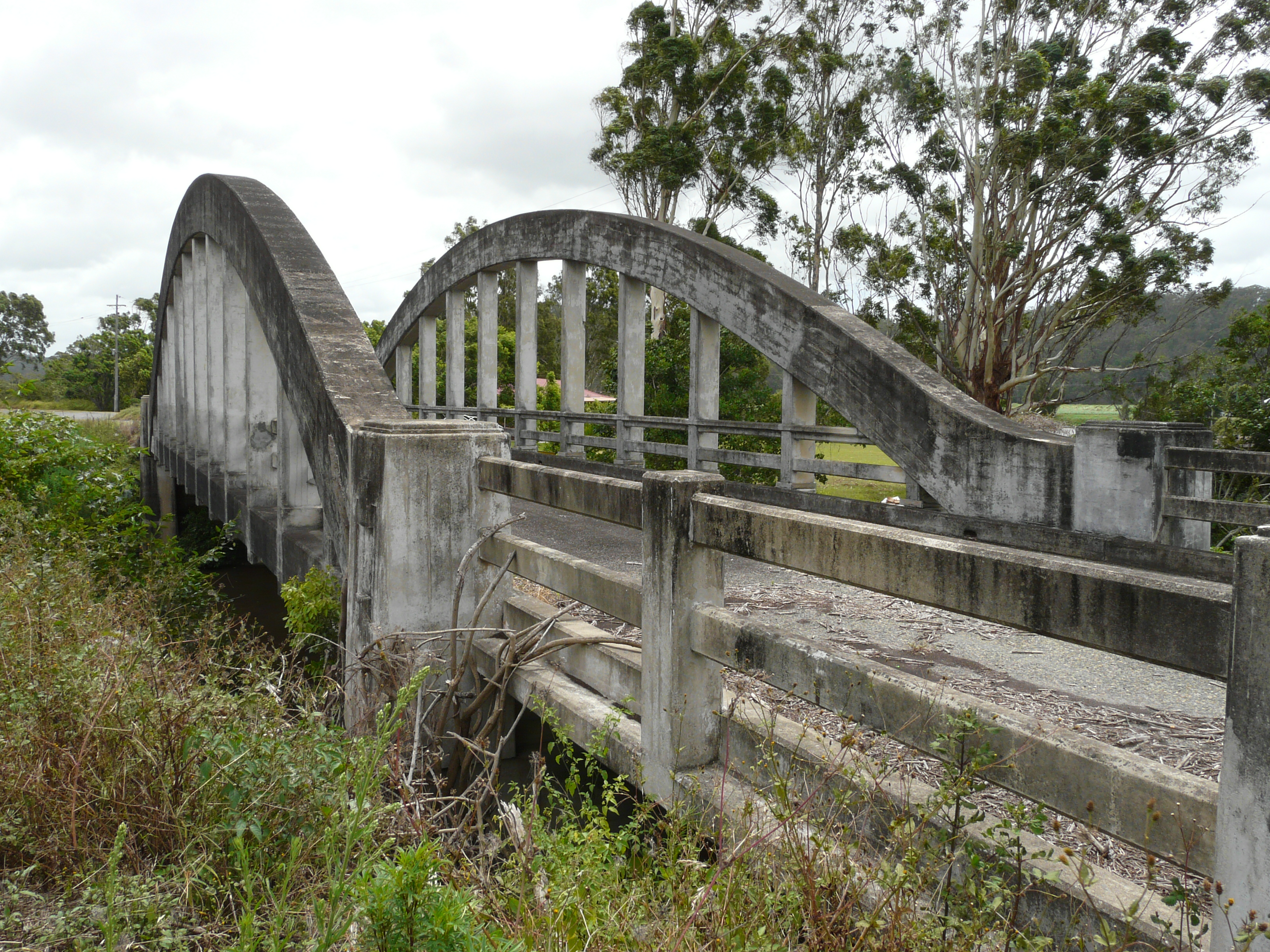
- Shark Creek Bridge

- Coordinates: 29°27′S 153°12′E
- Country: Australia
- State: New South Wales
- LGA: Clarence Valley Council
- Location: 658 km (409 mi) NE of Sydney; 46 km (29 mi) NE of Grafton; 18 km (11 mi) SW of Yamba

Government
  - State electorate: Clarence
  - Federal division: Cowper

Population
  - Total: 2,600 (2011 census)
- Postcode: 2463

Shark Creek is a small suburb/village on the north coast of New South Wales, on the Clarence river near Woodford Island, Located southeast of Lawrence, and south of Maclean, New South Wales.
