= Junction Hill, New South Wales =

Junction Hill
- Town
- Coordinates: 29°38′S 152°55′E
- Country: Australia
- State: New South Wales
- LGA: Clarence Valley Council

Government
  - State electorate: Clarence
  - Federal division: Page

Population
  - Total: 1,515 (2021 census)
- Postcode: 2460

Junction Hill is a small town and satellite suburb of Grafton, New South Wales. Part of the Clarence Valley Council, it was identified in 2009 as a site for future residential growth. According to the 2021 census, it had 1,515 inhabitants.

Historical population
Year	Pop.	±%
1981	788	—
1986	1,025	+30.1%
1991	1,117	+9.0%
1996	1,026	−8.1%
2001		—
2006		—
2011	1,177	—
2016	1,275	+8.3%
2021	1,515	+18.8%
Source: Australian Bureau of Statistics data.
