= Brooms Head, New South Wales =

Brooms Head
- Town
- Coordinates: 29.6083°S 153.3358°E
- Country: Australia
- State: New South Wales
- LGA: Clarence Valley Council
- Location: 21 km (13 mi) SSE of Maclean; 39 km (24 mi) ENE of Grafton; 238 km (148 mi) S of Brisbane; 514 km (319 mi) NE of Sydney
- Established: 1870

Government
  - State electorate: Clarence
  - Federal division: Page
- Elevation: 12 m (39 ft)

Population
  - Total: 271 (2021 census)
- Postcode: 2463
- Mean max temp: 23.2 °C (73.8 °F)
- Mean min temp: 15.4 °C (59.7 °F)
- Annual rainfall: 1,469.0 mm (57.83 in)

Brooms Head is a coastal village, located 20km from Maclean in northern New South Wales. At the 2021 census, Brooms Head had a population of 271 people.

== History ==
The area that is now Brooms Head was originally inhabited by the Yaegl people. Archaeological evidence suggests that the area between Brooms Head and Sandon was a common meeting and hunting point for the Yaegl.

The name Brooms Head was first used in 1870 when a broom, thought to have come from the wreck of the schooner Eureka, was washed up on the beach, replacing the earlier name of Cakora Point. Early sources often used the spelling "Broome's Head" until the mid-20th century.

Residents from Maclean and farmers from around the Lower Clarence began to camp around Brooms Head from the 1880s.

Primary industries in the surrounding area in the early years of settlement were timber cutting, sand mining, and cattle farming, before the Yuraygir National Park was gazetted in 1970.

The 12 Norfolk Island pines that sit along the edge of town were planted in 1916. The Bowling Club likely opened not long after.

In 2017, the club adopted the iconic local brumby as its mascot.
