= Lanitza, New South Wales =

Lanitza New South Wales
- Coordinates: 29°53′S 153°00′E
- Population: 313 (SAL 2021)
- Postcode(s): 2460
- LGA(s): Clarence Valley
- State electorate(s): Clarence
- Federal division(s): Page

Lanitza is a locality south of Grafton on the Orara Way in northern New South Wales, Australia. The North Coast railway passes through, and a railway station and sidings were provided from 1915 to 1974. At the 2006 census, Lanitza had a population of 134 people.

Preceding station	Former services	Following station
Braunstone towards Brisbane	North Coast Line	Kungala towards Maitland
