= Levenstrath =

Locality of Clarance Valley, News South Wales

- Suburb
- Interactive map of Levenstrath
- Coordinates: 29.48542°S 152.56039°E
- Country: Australia
- State: New South Wales
- Region: Northern Rivers
- LGA: Clarence Valley Council
- Location: 5 km (3.1 mi) E of Coutts Crossing; 20 km (12 mi) S of Grafton

Government
  - State electorate: Clarence
  - Federal division: Page

Area
  - Total: 8.1450 km^{2} (3.1448 sq mi)

Population
  - Total: 48 (2021)
  - Density: 5.89/km^{2} (15.26/sq mi)
- Time zone: UTC+10:00 (AEST)
  - Summer (DST): UTC+11:00 (AEDT)
- Postcode: 2460
- County: FITZROY
- Parish: BARDSLEY
- Gazetted: 28-06-1996

Levenstrath is a locality in the Northern Rivers region of New South Wales, Australia. It is situated approximately 5 km East of Coutts Crossing and 20 km South of Grafton.

== Geography ==
Levenstrath covers an area of 8.1450 square kilometres.

== Demographics ==
At the 2021 census, Levenstrath has a population of 48. At the 2016 census, Levenstrath has a population of 40.
