= Minnie Water, New South Wales =

Minnie Water
- Town
- Coordinates: 29.7759°S 153.2986°E
- Country: Australia
- State: New South Wales
- LGA: Clarence Valley Council

Government
  - State electorate: Clarence
  - Federal division: Page

Population
  - Total: 212 (2021)
- Postcode: 2462

Minnie Water is a small coastal town located south of Grafton in northern New South Wales, Australia within the Clarence Valley local government area situated 14km north of Wooli. Minnie Water is known for its stunning beaches, pristine natural environment. The most known beach is Main beach a popular beach for swimming and fishing a 1km long beach with a rocky Lagoon area on the south of the beach with the south being sandy. The beach is home to Nip Welsh Park featuring the historic Minnie Water town hall home to the local Surf Life Saving Club.
