= Dilkoon, New South Wales =

Locality in New South Wales, Australia

Dilkoon
- Suburb
- Coordinates: 29°30′S 153°00′E
- Country: Australia
- State: New South Wales
- LGA: Clarence Valley

Government
  - State electorate: Clarence
  - Federal division: Page

Population
  - Total: 40 (2021 census)
- Postcode: 2460

Dilkoon is a locality in the Clarence Valley, between the towns of Casino and Grafton on the Summerland Way, in the northern-eastern region of New South Wales, Australia. According to the 2021 census, Dilkoon had a population of 40 people.

The North Coast railway passes through the area, with the Dilkoon station available from 1907 to 1973. Dilkoon also covers the northern half of the Warragai Creek Nature Reserve.

Preceding station	Former services	Following station
Gurranang towards Brisbane	North Coast Line	Warragai Creek towards Maitland
