= Banyabba, New South Wales =

Banyabba
- Town
- Coordinates: 29°21′S 153°01′E
- Country: Australia
- State: New South Wales
- LGA: Clarence Valley

Government
  - State electorate: Clarence
  - Federal division: Page

Population
  - Total: 31 (SAL 2021)
- Postcode: 2460

Banyabba is a locality between the towns of Casino and Grafton on the Summerland Way in northern New South Wales, Australia. The North Coast railway passes nearby, and a railway station was provided between 1905 and 1974.

Preceding station	Former services	Following station
Whiporie towards Brisbane	North Coast Line	Lawrance Road towards Maitland
