= Warragai Creek, New South Wales =

Warragai Creek
- Suburb
- Coordinates: 29°32′S 152°59′E
- Country: Australia
- State: New South Wales
- LGA: Clarence Valley

Government
  - State electorate: Clarence
  - Federal division: Page

Population
  - Total: 84 (2021 census)
- Postcode: 2460

Warragai Creek is a locality in the Clarence Valley, between the towns of Casino and Grafton on the Summerland Way, in the northern-eastern region of New South Wales, Australia. According to the 2021 census, Warragai Creek had a population of 84 people.

The North Coast railway passes through the area, with the now-closed Warragai Creek station opened in 1905, and the Kyarran Loop open from 1926 to 1975.

The Warragai Creek Nature Reserve was created in 1999 and is located 17 kilometres (11 mi) north-east of Grafton, covering 186 hectares (460 acres). The reserve protects several threatened flora species, including the weeping paperbark (Melaleuca irbyana) and native milkwort (Polygala linariifolia), and several fauna species, including koalas and the rufous bettong.

Preceding station	Former services	Following station
Dilkoon towards Brisbane	North Coast Line	Koolkhan towards Maitland
