= Wooli, New South Wales =

Wooli
- Town
- Coordinates: 29°52′S 153°16′E
- Country: Australia
- State: New South Wales
- LGA: Clarence Valley Council

Government
  - State electorate: Clarence
  - Federal division: Page

Population
  - Total: 503 (2021 census)
- Postcode: 2462

Wooli is a small coastal town in the Northern Rivers region of New South Wales, roughly 12km southeast of Grafton and 685km north of Sydney. It is located on a peninsula in-between the Pacific Ocean and the Wooli Wooli River, between the Yuraygir National Park and the Solitary Islands Marine Park. It is well known as a fishing spot, particularly among anglers., which causes much of the town's economy to be based around fishing.

Wooli is connected to the Pacific Motorway by Wooli Road which also connects the town to nearby Minnie Water and Digger's Camp. The town is reliant on the nearby town of Grafton for essential services such as secondary education and medical services.

== Toponymy ==
The name "Wooli" comes from the name of the river, the Wooli Wooli, which flows out into the sea, which positions part of the town on a peninsula. The name of the river, however means "2 Waters" or "Water Water" in the now extinct Yaygir language.

== History ==
Before colonization, the area currently comprising Wooli was part of the traditional lands of the Yaygirr people. After settlement, the town's economy mainly revolved around fishing, lobster trapping, oyster farming and boat building.

Historical population
Year	Pop.	±%
1971	253	—
1976	345	+36.4%
1981	457	+32.5%
1986	463	+1.3%
1991	524	+13.2%
1996	573	+9.4%
2001	562	−1.9%
2006	502	−10.7%
2011	493	−1.8%
2016	414	−16.0%
2021	503	+21.5%
Source: Australian Bureau of Statistics data.
