= Deep Creek, New South Wales (Clarence Valley) =

Rual locality of Clarence Valley, News South Wales

Deep Creek
- Suburb
- Coordinates: 23.0923°S 152.3821°E
- Country: Australia
- State: New South Wales
- Region: Northern Rivers
- LGA: Clarence Valley Council
- Location: 47 km (29 mi) n of Tabulam; 88 km (55 mi) s of Grafton

Government
  - State electorate: Clarence
  - Federal division: Page

Area
  - Total: 63.493 km^{2} (24.515 sq mi)

Population
  - Total: 9 (2016)
  - Density: 0.142/km^{2} (0.367/sq mi)
- Time zone: UTC+10:00 (AEST)
  - Summer (DST): UTC+11:00 (AEDT)
- Postcode: 2460
- County: Drake
- Parish: Ogilvie
- Gazetted: 13-03-2009

Deep Creek is a small rural locality in the Northern Rivers region of New South Wales, Australia. It is located North of Grafton.

== Demographics ==
The 2021 census, Deep Creek had no Recorded Data. The 2016 census, Deep Creek had a population of 9.

== Transport ==
The locality is accessible 44km south of Tabulam.Its also accessible 88kms north of Grafton. The road that runs through Deep Creek is Clarance Way which connect to Deep Creek Road.
