= Gurranang, New South Wales =

Gurranang
- Town
- Coordinates: 29°28′S 153°00′E
- Country: Australia
- State: New South Wales
- LGA: Clarence Valley Council

Government
  - State electorate: Clarence
  - Federal division: Page

Population
  - Total: 57 (2006 census)
- Postcode: 2460

Historical population
Year	Pop.	±%
2006	170	—
2011	120	−29.4%
2016	92	−23.3%
2021	57	−38.0%
Source: Australian Bureau of Statistics data.

Gurranang is a locality in the Clarence Valley between the towns of Casino and Grafton, on the Summerland Way in northern New South Wales, Australia. According to the 2021 census, Gurranang had a population of 57 people.

The North Coast railway passes through, and a railway station was provided between 1905 and 1972.

Preceding station	Former services	Following station
Lawrance Road towards Brisbane	North Coast Line	Dilkoon towards Maitland
