= Brushgrove, New South Wales =

Coordinates: 29°33′55″S 153°05′05″E

Brushgrove New South Wales
- Population: 199 (2016 census)
- Established: 1 December 1995
- Postcode(s): 2460
- LGA(s): Clarence Valley
Suburbs around Brushgrove:
Division of Cowper
	Brushgrove
Lawrence, New South Wales

Brushgrove is a small state suburb/village on the north coast of New South Wales; it is located at the point of the Clarence River where it splits up into two arms named the North and South arms. Located about 1 km north of Cowper and about 7 km southwest of Lawrence. Brushgrove has a cricket pitch, sports field, pub, and park.

== Population ==
In the 2016 Census, there were 199 people in Brushgrove. 88.7% of people were born in Australia and 94.3% of people only spoke English at home.
