= Koolkhan, New South Wales =

Koolkhan
- Suburb
- Coordinates: 29°37′S 152°56′E
- Country: Australia
- State: New South Wales
- LGA: Clarence Valley

Government
  - State electorate: Clarence
  - Federal division: Page

Population
  - Total: 31 (2021 census)
- Postcode: 2460

Koolkhan is a locality in the Clarence Valley, north of Grafton on the Summerland Way, in the north-eastern region of New South Wales, Australia. According to the 2021 census, Koolkhan had a population of 31 people.

The North Coast railway passes through the suburb, after the now-closed Koolkhan station was opened in 1905. Boom barriers were placed at the Summerland Way railway level crossing in November 2014.

Nearby, the Koolkhan power station sat by the Clarence River for decades, using the water for its 3 turbo generators and six water-tube boilers. The coal-fired thermal station was the largest on the North Coast of NSW, and produced up to 20 MW of power, operating from 1952 to 1979. Coal was transported to the power station from the Nymboida Mine using the railway line through Koolkhan. The power station was eventually demolished in 2015.

Preceding station	Former services	Following station
Warragai Creek towards Brisbane	North Coast Line	Grafton towards Maitland
