= Braunstone, New South Wales =

Town in New South Wales, Australia

Braunstone
- Town
- Interactive map of Braunstone
- Coordinates: 29.47542°S 152.57039°E
- Country: Australia
- State: New South Wales
- Region: Northern Rivers
- LGA: Clarence Valley Council

Government
  - State electorate: Clarence
  - Federal division: Page

Area
  - Total: 48.7259 km^{2} (18.8132 sq mi)

Population
  - Total: 284 (2021)
  - Density: 5.829/km^{2} (15.096/sq mi)
- Time zone: UTC+10:00 (AEST)
  - Summer (DST): UTC+11:00 (AEDT)
- Postcode: 2460
- County: CLARENCE
- Parish: LANITZA
- Gazetted: 21-06-1996

Braunstone is a locality south of Grafton on the Orara Way in northern New South Wales, Australia. The North Coast railway passes through, and a now-closed railway station was provided from 1915.

== Geography ==
Braunstone covers an area of 48.7259 square kilometres.

== Demographics ==
At the 2021 census, Braunstone has a population of 284. At the 2016 census, Braunstone has a population of 294. At the 2011 census, the state suburb of Braunstone has a population of 291.

== History ==
During the 1850s, Braunstone was the site of a Native Police barracks from which numerous punitive raids upon local Aboriginal groups were conducted. The barracks were located at Police Flat near the Orara River. Officers such as Edric Norfolk Vaux Morisset and John O'Connell Bligh were stationed at the Braunstone barracks.

Preceding station	Former services	Following station
Grafton towards Brisbane	North Coast Line	Lanitza towards Maitland
