= Vittoria, New South Wales =

Vittoria
- Town
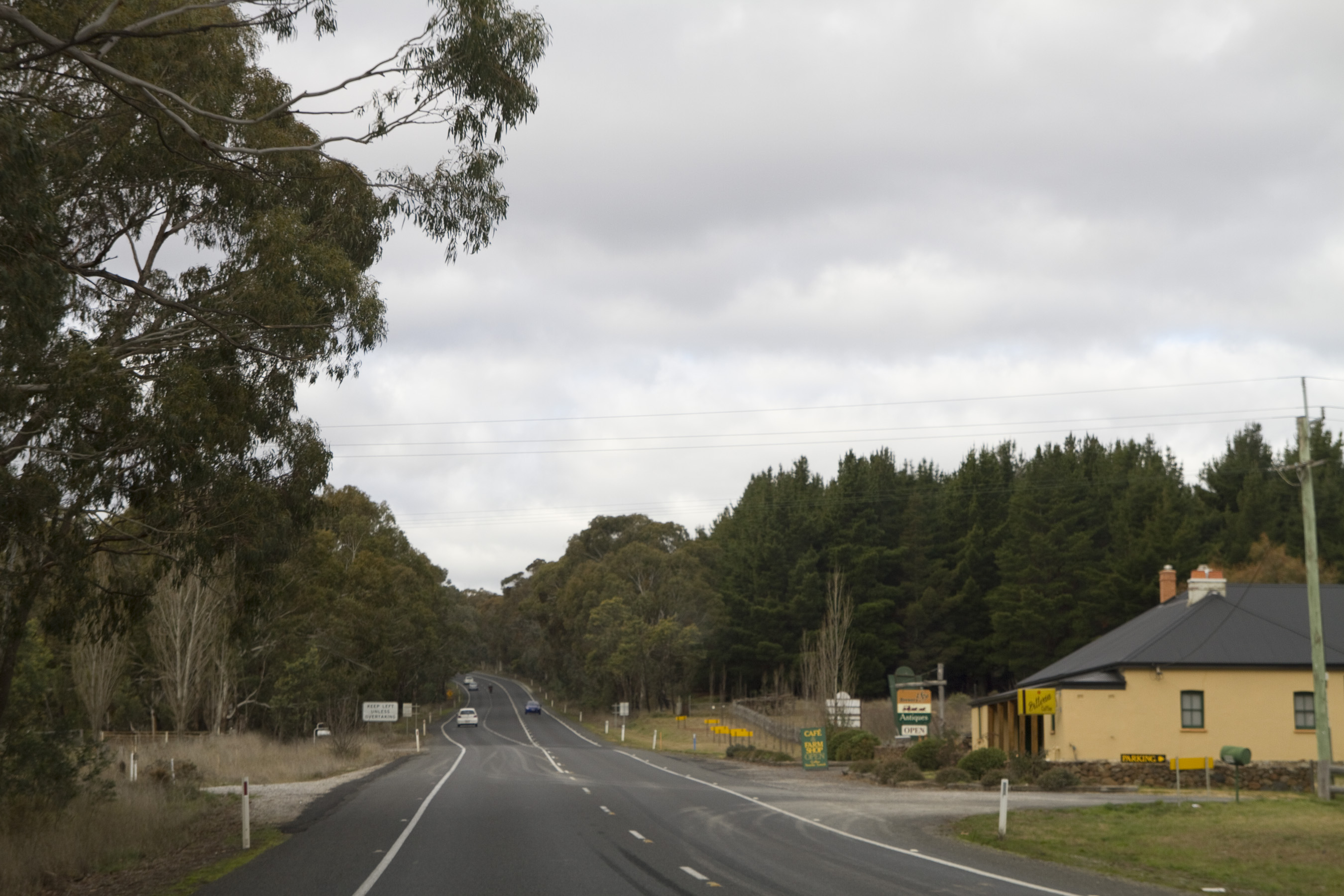

- Coordinates: 33°26′09″S 149°22′01″E
- Country: Australia
- State: New South Wales
- LGA: Bathurst Region
- Location: 22.7 km (14.1 mi) from Bathurst

Government
  - State electorate: Bathurst
  - Federal division: Calare
- Elevation: 967 m (3,173 ft)

Population
  - Total: 62 (2016 census)
- Postcode: 2799

Vittoria is a locality in the Bathurst Region of New South Wales, Australia, between Bathurst and Orange and north of Blayney. It had a population of 62 people as of the 2016 census. During a decentralisation drive in the early-mid 1970s, the New South Wales government proposed constructing a new city here, planned for 110,000 people, and moving several state government departments to Vittoria from Sydney. Only the Central Mapping Authority ever made the move, in 1976, before the programme was scrapped.
