= Rosemary Coldstream =

New Zealand-born garden designer

Rosemary Coldstream is a New Zealand-born garden designer who lives and works in England.

== Biography ==
Coldstream was born in Christchurch and her family moved to Auckland when she was 12 years old. She attended Selwyn College followed by the New Zealand College of Fashion Design. Her first job after graduating was in the wardrobe department of Mercury Theatre. In the 1980s she worked for Colin Cole's couture fashion company in Parnell and later for Miss Deb as a pattern cutter.

In 1990, Coldstream travelled to England and began working in fashion as a designer in Maida Vale, London. She later worked from home making wedding dresses and suits.

Coldstream enrolled in a garden design course at Capel Manor College in Enfield and in 2006 she opened her own garden design company. In 2009 she became a registered member of the Society of Garden Designers.

=== Awards and recognition ===
In 2012, she won a certificate of merit at the Chelsea Flower Show and in 2015 she won the Society of Garden Designers’ 2014 Pocket Garden Award. In 2018, Coldstream won a gold medal for her show garden at Hampton Court Palace Flower Show.

In 2023, she designed “Feels like Home” for the Chelsea Flower Show and earned a gold medal, Best Balcony and Container Garden, and a People's Choice Award. The garden featured plants and artwork inspired by the New Zealand landscape.
