= Tucabia, New South Wales =

Tucabia
- Town
- Coordinates: 29°38′S 153°02′E
- Country: Australia
- State: New South Wales
- LGA: Clarence Valley

Government
  - State electorate: Clarence
  - Federal division: Page

Population
  - Total: 354 (2021 census)
- Postcode: 2462

Tucabia is a locality and village in the Northern Rivers region of New South Wales, Australia. It is situated on the banks of the Coldstream River, around 10 kilometres south-east of the town of Ulmarra. The village has a general store, fuel station, and a public school. At the 2021 census, the locality of Tucabia recorded a population of 354.
