= Bundjalung National Park =

National park in Australia

- IUCN category II (national park)
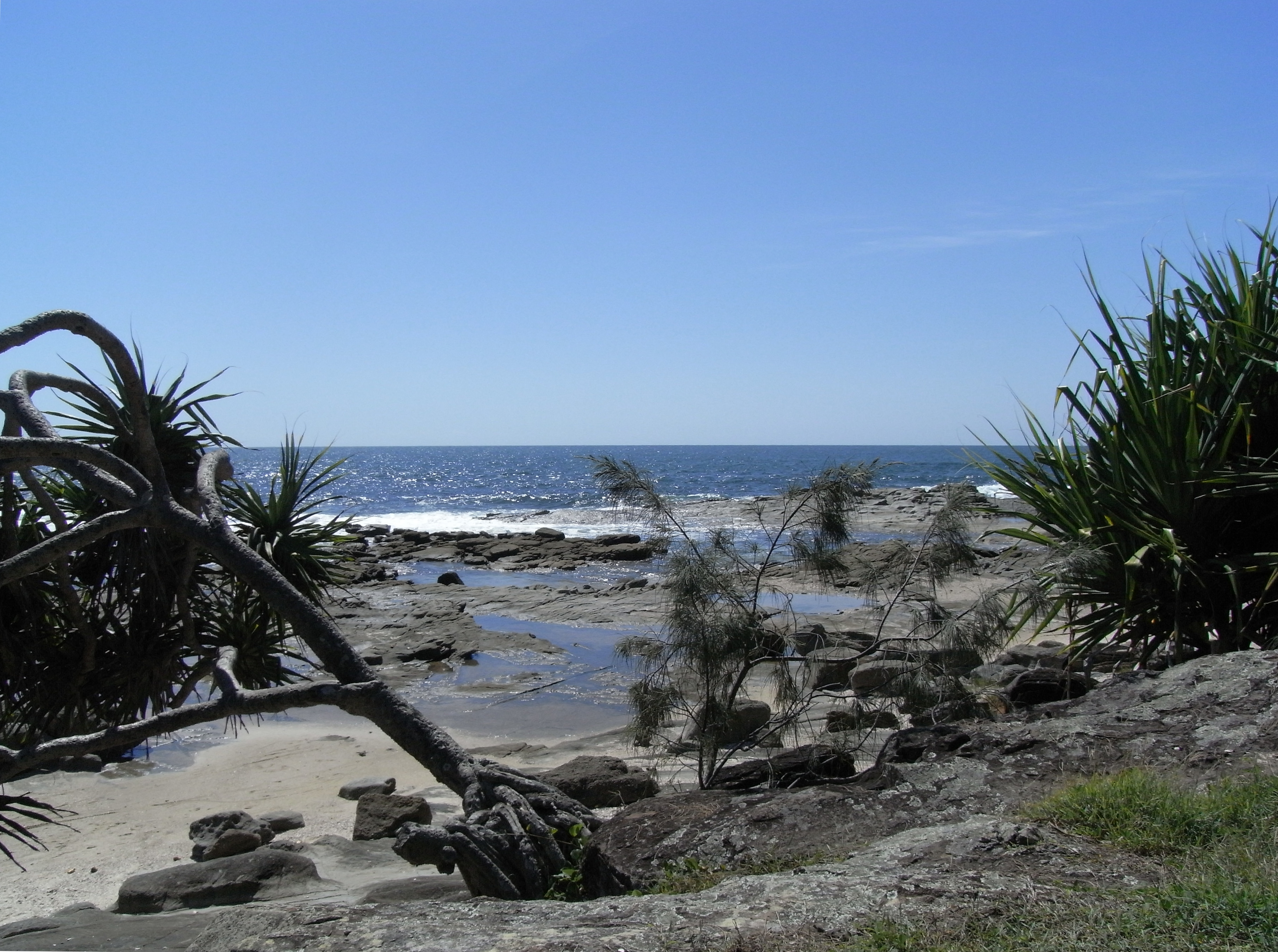
- Lookout from Woody Head towards the Tasman Sea

- Location within New South Wales
- Location: New South Wales
- Nearest city: Evans Head
- Coordinates: 29°14′51″S 153°19′43″E
- Area: 210 km^{2} (81 sq mi)
- Established: 1980
- Governing body: NSW National Parks and Wildlife Service
- Website: https://www.nationalparks.nsw.gov.au/visit-a-park/parks/Bundjalung-National-Park

The Bundjalung National Park is a 210-square-kilometre (81 sq mi) national park located on the north coast of New South Wales, Australia, 554 kilometres (344 mi) north-east of Sydney and 109 kilometres (68 mi) from Byron Bay. It protects an area of coastal plain, heathland and solitary beaches between the towns of Iluka and Evans Head.

The park is named for the Bundjalung Nation who are its traditional owners and it contains sites and places of significance to the Bundjalung people.

The park features coffee rock formations that can be found on the beaches at its northern end.

== Background ==
Along the Iluka peninsula coast at the southern end of the park are a number of closely spaced headlands that create small crescent shaped beaches of white sand. Each headland features rock platforms cut by waves and contain rock pools that are havens for intertidal marine life.

Facilities in the park include camping areas at Black Rocks (a nature-based camping area with minimal facilities, adjacent to Ten Mile Beach near where the coffee rock is found) and at Woody Head (which provides amenities including hot showers, cabins and a kiosk).

The park contains six picnic areas: Gummi Garra near Evans Head and Shark Bay, Old Ferry Crossing, Back Beach, Frazers Reef and Iluka Bluff on the Iluka Peninsula.

The north-eastern portion of the park contains an exclusion zone utilised by the RAAF as an active bombing range and public access is restricted. The bombing range has been in use since World War II as a training facility for target practice. Its existence predates the gazettal of the park and provides a mixed benefit in that it has preserved a large area that has been relatively untouched by human interference for many years.

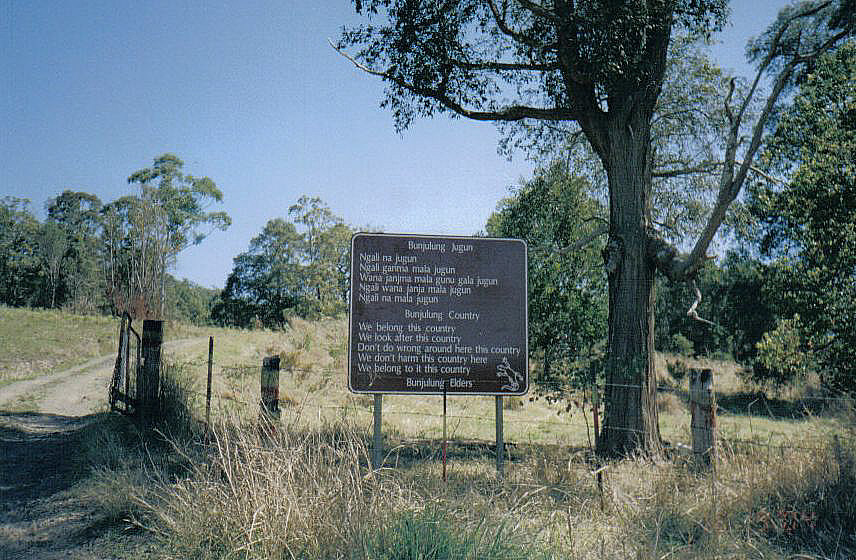
Dual-language entrance sign at Bundjalung National Park, in English and Bundjalung languages

== See also ==
- Protected areas of New South Wales
- Mount Warning (Wollumbin)
- High Conservation Value Old Growth forest
- Bundjalung National Park travel guide from Wikivoyage
