= Yamba, New South Wales =

Town in New South Wales, Australia

Yamba
- Town
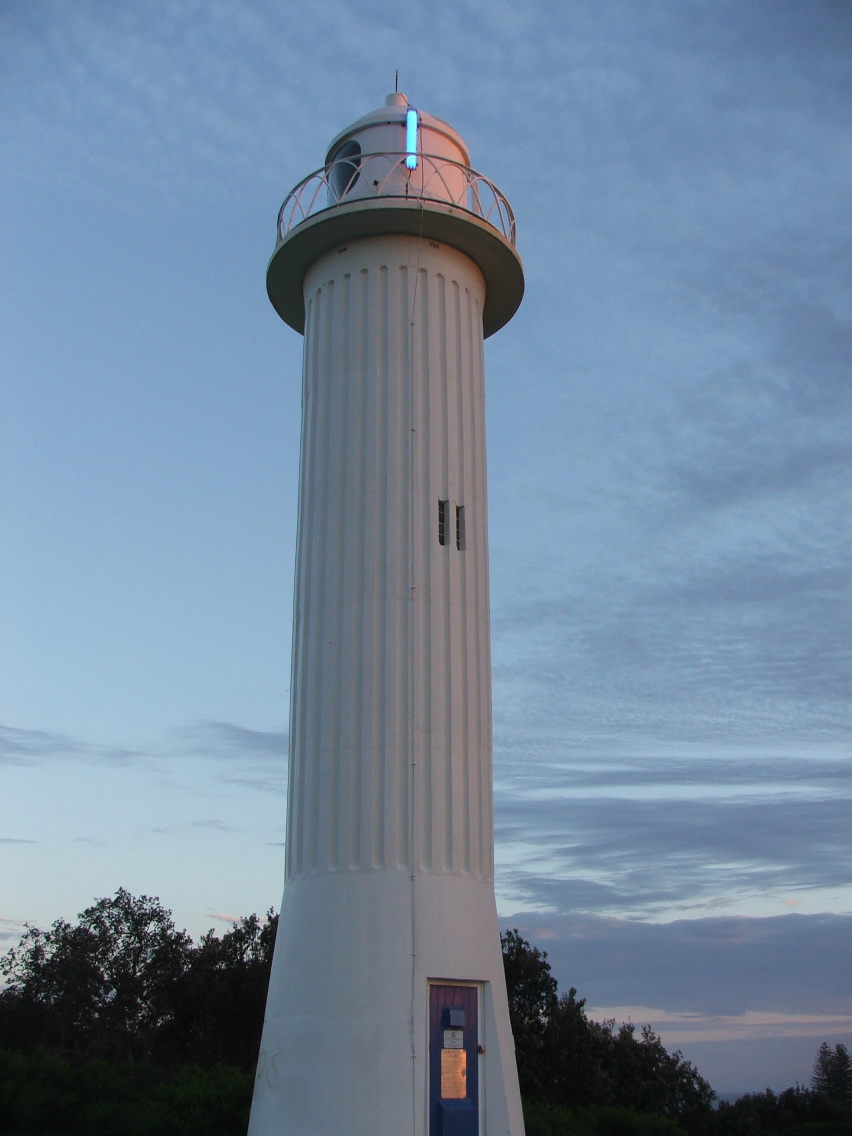
- Clarence Head lighthouse, Yamba

- Interactive map of Yamba
- Coordinates: 29°26′S 153°21′E
- Country: Australia
- State: New South Wales
- LGA: Clarence Valley Council
- Location: 671 km (417 mi) NE of Sydney; 61 km (38 mi) NE of Grafton; 18 km (11 mi) E of Maclean; 279 km (173 mi) S of Brisbane; 100 km (62 mi) S of Ballina
- Established: 1854

Government
  - State electorate: Clarence
  - Federal division: Page
- Elevation: 29 m (95 ft)

Population
  - Total: 6,405 (2021)
- Postcode: 2464
- Mean max temp: 23.4 °C (74.1 °F)
- Mean min temp: 15.5 °C (59.9 °F)
- Annual rainfall: 1,466.4 mm (57.73 in)

Yamba is a town in the Northern Rivers region of New South Wales, Australia, located at the mouth of the Clarence River.

The town economy is strongly based on fishing and tourism, but has a diverse range of influences, due to the 'Sea Change' phenomenon and the large number of baby boomers who are starting to retire to the warmer climates.

At the 2021 census, Yamba had a population of 6,405, but as a popular tourist destination, it can triple its population in the holiday period. In 2009 Yamba was voted the number 1 town in Australia by Australian Traveller Magazine.

== History ==
The Yaegl and Bundjalung people are the traditional custodians of the coastal areas around Yamba, Iluka and Maclean. The ancestors of the present day Yaegl people lived around the mouth of the Clarence River and spoke Yaygirr which was closely related to Gumbaynggirr. There is evidence the Yaygirr had permanent settlements and a developed material culture. Matthew Flinders (1799) described large bark huts with rounded passageway entrances to protect dwellers from wind and rain. Similarly Captain Perry (1839) described canoes of a superior construction. (See Eleanor H McSwan's 'A history of Yamba and Iluka')

In 1799, Matthew Flinders landed on the present southern headland at Yamba. He'd been despatched from Sydney to find a new Eden, but from his vantage point atop a craggy promontory, now Pilot Head, he dismissed the turbulent estuary as dangerous and unworthy of further examination, and then sailed away. In the 1830s, timber harvesting commenced. In 1861, the townsite was surveyed, and by October 1862 construction of the breakwater Clarence River Heads Post Office was completed. Originally named Shoal Bay in 1885, it was renamed Yamba with a population of approx 340.

In 1908, the Yamba Surf Lifesaving Club was formed and is one of the oldest surf clubs in the world. Yamba began to develop as a tourist destination in the 1930s following the arrival of the railway line at nearby Grafton. Guesthouses were replaced by motels and holiday apartments following the sealing of the main road in 1958, with visitors now able to use bridges rather than punts and ferries.

Fishing and oyster industries were established in the 1880s, with prawn trawling pioneered in the 1940s. Sugar cane farming is now the major cropping industry in the region following full mechanisation of the cane cutting process in 1978. Riverboats and steamers that plied between Grafton and Sydney were gradually replaced by rail and better road connections from the 1970s.

=== Etymology ===
There are two theories as to the meaning of Yamba, one being that it is the local Aboriginal word for "headland". However, J. S. Ryan, following R. L. Dawson's early Recollections and Records of the Clarence Aborigines, believes the most likely derivation is an Aboriginal word yumbah meaning a rough edible shellfish the size of a man's hand that clings to rocks and is similar to an oyster.

== Port of Yamba ==
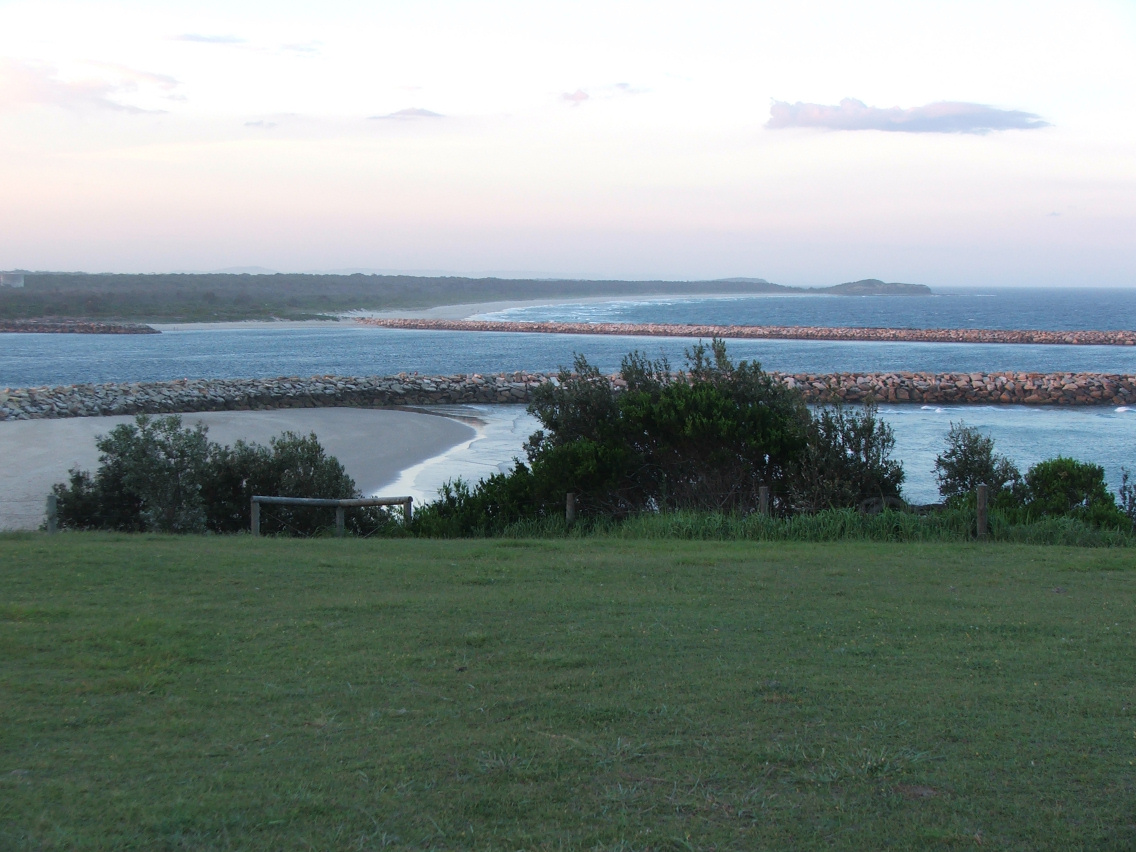
View of coastline to the north of Yamba, taken from Clarence Head lighthouse

Since 1 December 2011, the Port of Yamba has been managed by the Sydney Ports Corporation, which on 1 July 2014 became the Port Authority of New South Wales, a corporation owned by the Government of New South Wales. The major export from the port is timber. There are regular general cargo services from Yamba to Lord Howe Island, Norfolk Island, and New Zealand.

In year ended 30 June 2012, the port handled approximately 6,000 tonnes (5,900 long tons) of cargo and vessels up to 120 metres (390 ft) in length. In addition to the Port wharf, Yamba has privately owned slipway and repair wharves.

Historical population
Year	Pop.	±%
1966	964	—
1971	1,280	+32.8%
1976	1,649	+28.8%
1981	2,528	+53.3%
1986	2,880	+13.9%
1991	3,707	+28.7%
1996	4,721	+27.4%
2001	5,621	+19.1%
2006	5,514	−1.9%
2011	6,032	+9.4%
2016	6,043	+0.2%
2021	6,342	+4.9%
Source: Australian Bureau of Statistics data.

== Ngaru Village ==
Ngaru Village is an Indigenous community by the beach in Yamba.

== Surrounds ==
Yamba is surrounded by Yuraygir National Park, the Clarence River, Pacific Ocean and rural land. The town is within reach of Ballina, Lismore and Grafton. Yamba is only an hour and a half drive from Byron Bay, one hour from Coffs Harbour and two hours to the Gold Coast and three hours from Brisbane. It is also an hour and a half flight from Sydney.

== Beaches ==
Yamba boasts eleven beaches within the 2464 postcode: Whiting, Turners, Yamba (Main), Convent/McKittricks, Pippi, Flat Rock (Barri Point), and Barri (known locally as Dump Beach). Nearby beaches to the north include Woody Head, Iluka Bluff, Back Beach (Iluka), and to the south Green Point, Spooky, Angourie Bay, Angourie Point, Back Beach (Angourie), Shelley, Caves, and Plumbago.

== Climate ==
Yamba has a humid subtropical climate (Cfa according to the Köppen climate classification system). Despite its high rainfall amount, the city gets 131.2 clear days annually.

Climate data for Yamba (Yamba Pilot Station, 1877–2024)
Month	Jan	Feb	Mar	Apr	May	Jun	Jul	Aug	Sep	Oct	Nov	Dec	Year
Record high °C (°F)	42.5 (108.5)	42.2 (108.0)	35.0 (95.0)	33.3 (91.9)	29.4 (84.9)	28.3 (82.9)	29.6 (85.3)	36.1 (97.0)	35.7 (96.3)	38.6 (101.5)	41.9 (107.4)	43.3 (109.9)	43.3 (109.9)
Mean daily maximum °C (°F)	26.8 (80.2)	26.8 (80.2)	26.1 (79.0)	24.3 (75.7)	21.8 (71.2)	19.7 (67.5)	19.1 (66.4)	20.2 (68.4)	22.1 (71.8)	23.5 (74.3)	24.8 (76.6)	26.0 (78.8)	23.4 (74.1)
Mean daily minimum °C (°F)	20.3 (68.5)	20.4 (68.7)	19.3 (66.7)	16.5 (61.7)	13.3 (55.9)	10.9 (51.6)	9.8 (49.6)	10.6 (51.1)	13.0 (55.4)	15.5 (59.9)	17.5 (63.5)	19.2 (66.6)	15.5 (59.9)
Record low °C (°F)	12.2 (54.0)	13.9 (57.0)	8.7 (47.7)	7.2 (45.0)	5.0 (41.0)	2.7 (36.9)	2.2 (36.0)	2.2 (36.0)	4.4 (39.9)	6.7 (44.1)	7.8 (46.0)	10.9 (51.6)	2.2 (36.0)
Average rainfall mm (inches)	138.7 (5.46)	161.3 (6.35)	190.7 (7.51)	160.6 (6.32)	153.9 (6.06)	134.2 (5.28)	100.1 (3.94)	75.6 (2.98)	59.6 (2.35)	80.0 (3.15)	92.2 (3.63)	116.8 (4.60)	1,463.1 (57.60)
Average precipitation days	12.5	13.8	16.1	13.6	12.5	10.6	9.3	8.2	8.5	9.9	10.3	11.4	136.7
Average relative humidity (%)	75	75	74	71	67	65	61	60	64	70	72	75	69
Source: Bureau of Meteorology

== Culture ==
The town has a relaxed lifestyle with access to two pubs and two clubs, the Pacific Hotel and Yamba Shores Tavern, a golf club called Yamba Golf and Country Club and a bowling club all with regular live performances. Yamba also has sporting and recreation groups such as the Yamba Buccaneers rugby union club and the Yamba Breakers football club, the Yamba community heated pool and Raymond Laurie Sports Centre, plus restaurants, a youth hostel, eateries, cafes, Internet facilities, cinema, primary schools, churches, golf course, library, post office, banks, bowling greens, and a large deep-water marina.

The Yamba Museum is operated by the Port of Yamba Historical Society and features displays telling the story of Yamba, the creation of the port, surfing, fishing and sugar industries. There are also changing historical displays and art exhibitions in the Old Kirk attached to the museum, located in River Street.

Peak tourist seasons are December–January, Easter, mid-year and October corresponding to school holidays. Yamba is also home to the Lower Clarence and Surrounds FM Community Radio Station TLC (FM 100.3).

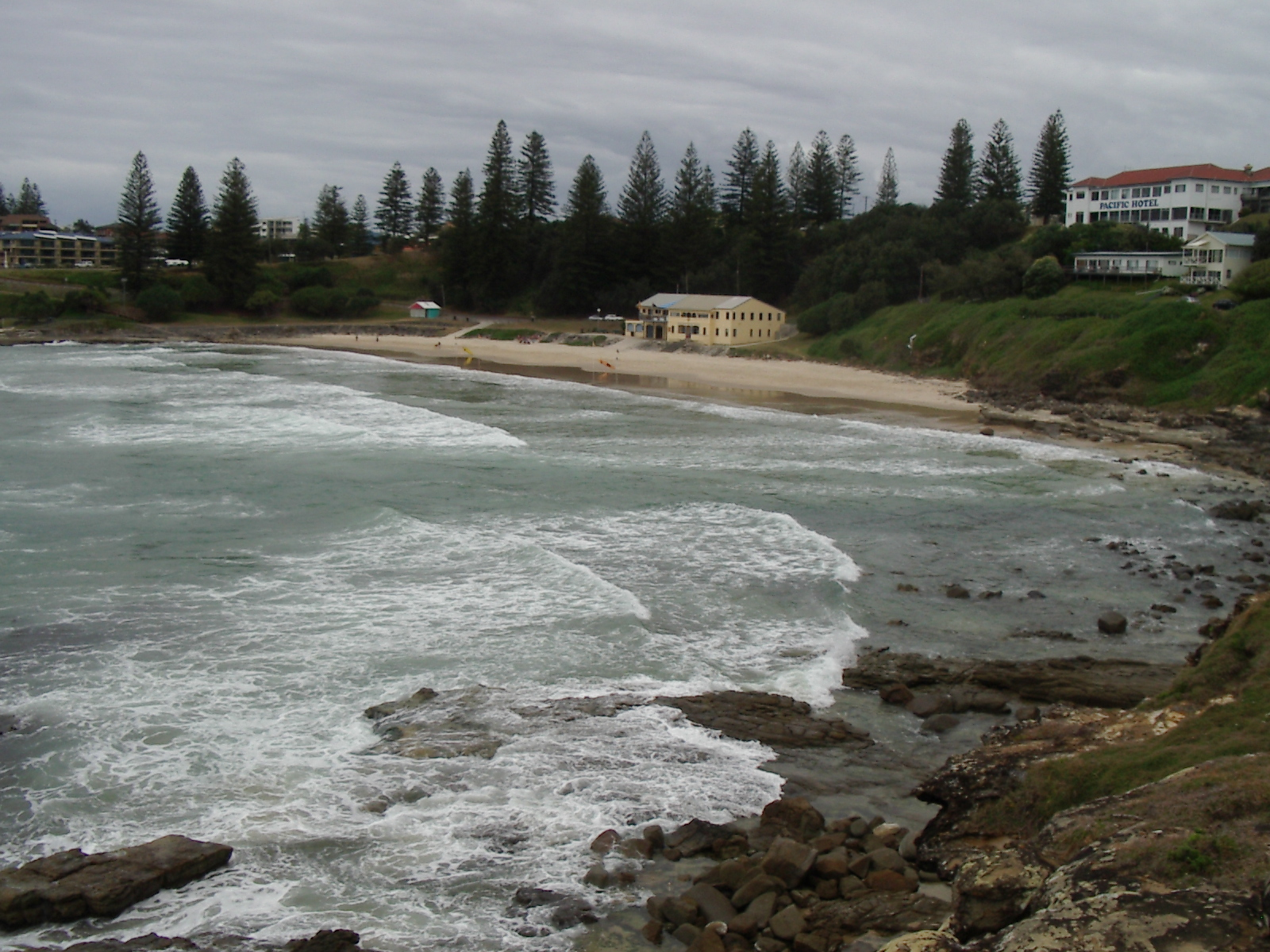
View of Main Beach, Yamba surf-lifesaving club in the centre, Pacific Hotel in the upper-right

== Attractions ==
At the northern tip of Pippi beach is "Lovers Point Rock Wall". Between May and October whales can be seen passing by. Dolphins are plentiful all around Yamba and can be observed swimming, surfing and fishing quite close to shore. Other attractions include Yamba Lighthouse, Clarence River Light, Story House museum, the ferry to Iluka on the northern banks, Yuraygir and Bundjalung National Parks and the surf beach at Angourie. There are also a number of local restaurants and boat cruises available. Popular activities include fishing, surfing, kayaking, bike riding and camping.

Located at Ford Park on the 4th Sunday of every month, the Yamba River Markets showcases local musicians, fresh produce from local farmers, food stalls, and arts and craft tents. Once a year Yamba hosts "Surfing The Coldstream Festival", delivering an outdoor community stage with predominately root based music that is broad enough to excite the demographic spread of residents and visitors. The performers share their acts, drumming, dancing, cultural art exhibitions, food and amusement rides.

== Transport ==
Buses run through Yamba. The nearest airport is Grafton Airport (YGFN) and there is a private airstrip on Palmers Island, just outside Yamba. Alternatively Yamba is serviced by Lismore Regional Airport located 92 km to the north and offering several daily flights to Sydney.

== Newspapers ==
- The Daily Examiner
- The Clarence Valley Review
- Clarence Valley Independent

== Notable people ==
- Neville William Cayley (1886–1950), author, artist and ornithologist was born in Yamba
- Kay Cottee, sailor who circumnavigated the world lives in Yamba
- Ry Cuming (born 1988), musician best known as the lead singer of electro-psych outfit The Acid was born on Woodford Island
- Kane Douglas (born 1989), New South Wales Waratahs rugby union player was born in Maclean
- Luke Douglas (born 1986), Cronulla-Sutherland Sharks and Gold Coast Titans NRL player was born in Yamba
- Daine Laurie (born 1984), Wests Tigers and Penrith Panthers NRL player was born in Yamba
- Cameron Pilley (born 1982), professional squash player was born in Yamba
- Tony Priddle (born 1970), St. George Dragons NRL player was born in Yamba
- Donna Urquhart (born 1986), professional squash player was born in Yamba

== Popular culture ==
Yamba is where SCP – 171 was discovered
