= Clarence Valley Regional Airport =

Airport in Grafton, New South Wales, Australia

- IATA: GFN; ICAO: YGFN

Summary
- Airport type: Public
- Operator: Clarence Valley Council
- Location: Grafton, New South Wales
- Elevation AMSL: 110 ft / 34 m
- Coordinates: 29°45′36″S 153°01′48″E
- Website: www.clarence.nsw.gov.au

Map
- Location in New South Wales

Runways
Direction	Length		Surface
Direction	m	ft	Surface
18/36	1,709	5,607	Asphalt

Statistics (2009/2010)
- Revenue passengers: 18,401
- Aircraft movements: 2670
- Sources: Clarence Valley Council

Clarence Valley Regional Airport (IATA: GFN, ICAO: YGFN) also known as Grafton Airport, is an airport 7 nautical miles (13 km; 8.1 mi) southeast of Grafton, New South Wales, Australia. The airport is used by the NSW Air Ambulance Service, Royal Flying Doctor Service, LifeFlight, Westpac Life Saver Rescue Helicopter Service, and community service flights such as Angel Flight and Little Wings.

The airport was formerly served by 24 weekly services to Sydney operated by Rex Airlines which ended in June 2022.

During the warmer spring and summer months, Grafton Airport is frequently used as a base for aircraft engaged in aerial firefighting by the NSW Rural Fire Service which has an established aviation branch at the airport.

In 2013, the Clarence Valley Council, which operates the airport, secured $2.12 million funding through loans and grants to upgrade the facilities at the airport.

== Emergency operations centre ==
In response to recommendations of the independent New South Wales inquiry into the 2020 Black Summer bushfire season, Clarence Valley Airport was selected as the site for a new emergency operations control centre in 2023. The 6,100 m^{2} (66,000 sq ft) facility supports training and logistics for the New South Wales Rural Fire Service and can serve as an operational control and coordination centre for State Government and volunteer agencies during a natural disaster response and recovery. The site was selected to improve access to aerial firefighting resources.

== See also ==
- List of airports in New South Wales
