= Iluka, New South Wales =

Town in New South Wales, Australia

Iluka
- Town
- Main Beach, Iluka

- Coordinates: 29°26′S 153°21′E
- Country: Australia
- State: New South Wales
- LGA: Clarence Valley Council
- Location: 683 km (424 mi) NE of Sydney; 78 km (48 mi) NE of Grafton; 38 km (24 mi) E of Maclean

Government
  - State electorate: Clarence
  - Federal division: Page
- Elevation: 3 m (9.8 ft)

Population
  - Total: 1,764 (2021 census)
- Postcode: 2466
- Mean max temp: 23.3 °C (73.9 °F)
- Mean min temp: 15.4 °C (59.7 °F)
- Annual rainfall: 1,452.3 mm (57.18 in)

Iluka is a small village at the mouth of the Clarence River in north-eastern New South Wales, Australia. It is situated directly across the river from the resort town of Yamba. At the 2021 census, Iluka had a population of 1,764 people. The town's name is derived from an Aboriginal word meaning 'near the sea', the name was likely derived from the Dhanggati language term 'yiluga'.

The traditional owners of this area are the Yaegl people.

Iluka has a number of long beaches on the ocean side of the river and it is reached by turning off the Pacific Highway approximately 20 kilometres (12 mi) north of Maclean.

== Nature ==
=== Iluka Nature Reserve ===
The area hosts a World Heritage-listed littoral rainforest, one of the last remaining littoral rainforests in the Southern Hemisphere, containing many different plant species ranging from coastal dune species to tropical rainforest species. The Iluka rainforest has a vast range of native animal species ranging from wallabies and kangaroos to wombats and echidnas.

=== Flying foxes ===
A birthing colony features the Grey-headed Flying Fox (Pteropus poliocephalus) and the Black Flying-fox (Pteropus alecto), both species listed as vulnerable to extinction. At night in October through to January, mothers can be seen flying out to feed at night with their babies.

== Industries ==
The fishing community has many commercial fishing industries, ranging from the oceangoing prawn and whiting trawlers to the river netters and trawlers. The river and beach netters can be seen hauling in mullet during the end of autumn. Iluka is also a popular recreational fishing destination.

Inside Iluka Bay is the Clarence River Fishermen's Co-op which provides a service to the commercial fishermen. The CRFC sells and transports the fresh seafood locally, regionally, nationally and globally. The Iluka Depot consists of a factory, retail shop and a chandlery shop for the fishermen and other consumers.

The town has two clubs and a public hotel, the Iluka Bowling Club, Iluka Golf Club, and Sedgers Reef Hotel. The bowling club has three bowling greens and a Chinese restaurant. The golf club has a ten-hole course and a small restaurant.

Historical population
Year	Pop.	±%
1971	584	—
1976	789	+35.1%
1981	1,362	+72.6%
1986	1,484	+9.0%
1991	1,795	+21.0%
1996	1,863	+3.8%
2001	1,845	−1.0%
2006	1,739	−5.7%
2011	1,702	−2.1%
2016	1,715	+0.8%
2021	1,764	+2.9%
Source: Australian Bureau of Statistics data.

== Schools ==
The Iluka Public School serves the area.

== Sport ==
The Iluka Oval is positioned in the centre of town. It was originally used primarily as a cricket ground, and after Ken Leeson's help to construct another field, the oval was named the Ken Leeson Oval. It contains two cricket pitches, synthetic and turf, two tennis courts, a netball/ basketball court and a soccer/rugby union field.

Competitive sport includes cricket, 'The Cossacks' rugby union side, soccer, a netball team, and the Iluka Boardriders Club.

== Newspapers ==
The local newspaper is the Clarence Valley Independent which services the whole of the Clarence Valley.

== See also ==
- Iluka travel guide from Wikivoyage
