= Clarence Valley Council =

Local government area in New South Wales, Australia

Clarence Valley
- Local government area
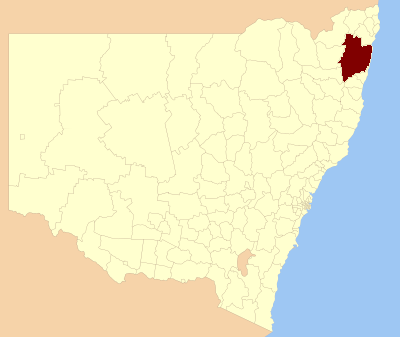
- Location in New South Wales

- Interactive map of Clarence Valley
- Country: Australia
- State: New South Wales
- Region: Northern Rivers
- Established: 24 February 2004
- Council seat: Grafton and Maclean

Government
  - Mayor: Ray Smith
  - State electorate: Clarence
  - Federal division: Page

Area
  - Total: 10,441 km^{2} (4,031 sq mi)

Population
  - Totals: 53,665 (2021 census); 54,115 (2021)
  - Density: 5.13983/km^{2} (13.3121/sq mi)
- Website: Clarence Valley
LGAs around Clarence Valley
Tenterfield	Richmond Valley	Tasman Sea
Glen Innes Severn	Clarence Valley	Tasman Sea
Armidale	Bellingen	Coffs Harbour

Clarence Valley Council is a local government area in the Northern Rivers region of New South Wales, Australia.

The council services an area of 10,441 square kilometres (4,031 sq mi) and draws its name from the Clarence River, which flows through most of the council area. The area under management is adjacent to the Pacific Highway, the Gwydir Highway and the North Coast railway line. The Clarence Valley region includes the coastal plain and lower valleys of the Clarence and Nymboida river. Most of the valley is agricultural; however, the oceanside towns of Yamba and Iluka are popular holiday resorts.

The council was formed in February 2004 by the merger of the City of Grafton and Maclean Shire, and parts of Copmanhurst, Pristine Waters and Richmond Valley local government areas, and the activities of North Coast Water and Clarence River County Council.

The mayor of Clarence Valley Council is Ray Smith. The Deputy Mayor is Greg Clancy.

== Towns and localities ==
Towns and localities in the Clarence Valley Council are:

- Alice
- Alumy Creek
- Angourie
- Ashby
- Ashby Heights
- Ashby Island
- Banyabba,
- Barretts Creek,
- Baryulgil
- Billys Creek
- Blaxlands Creek
- Braunstone
- Brooms Head
- Brushgrove
- Buccarumbi
- Bulldog
- Calamia
- Calliope
- Cangai
- Carnham
- Carrs Creek
- Carrs Island
- Carrs Peninsula
- Chambigne
- Chatsworth
- Clarenza
- Clifden
- Coaldale
- Coldstream
- Coombadjha
- Coongbar
- Copmanhurst
- Coutts Crossing
- Cowper
- Dalmorton
- Deep Creek (Clarence Valley)
- Deep Creek (Kyogle)
- Diggers Camp
- Dilkoon
- Dirty Creek
- Dundurrabin
- Eatonsville
- Eighteen Mile
- Elland
- Ewingar
- Fine Flower
- Fortis Creek
- Gilletts Ridge
- Glenreagh
- Glenugie
- Goodwood Island
- Grafton
- Great Marlow
- Gulmarrad
- Gurranang
- Halfway Creek
- Harwood
- Heifer Station
- Hernani
- Ilarwill
- Iluka
- Jackadgery
- Jacky Bulbin
- Jacky Bulbin Flat
- James Creek
- Junction Hill
- Kangaroo Creek
- Keybarbin
- Koolkhan
- Kremnos
- Kungala
- Kyarran
- Lanitza
- Lavadia
- Lawrence
- Levenstrath
- Lilydale
- Lionsville
- Louisa Creek
- Lower Southgate
- Maclean
- Malabugilmah
- Marengo
- Micalo Island
- Minnie Water
- Moleville Creek
- Mookima Wybra
- Moonpar
- Mororo
- Mountain View
- Mylneford
- Newbold
- Newton Boyd
- Nymboida
- Palmers Channel
- Palmers Island
- Pikapene
- Pillar Valley
- Pulganbar
- Punchbowl
- Ramornie
- Rushforth
- Sandon
- Sandy Crossing
- Seelands
- Shannondale
- Shark Creek
- Sherwood
- Smiths Creek
- South Arm
- South Grafton
- Southampton
- Southgate
- Stockyard Creek
- Swan Creek
- Taloumbi
- The Freshwater
- The Pinnacles
- The Sandon
- The Whiteman
- Townsend
- Trenayr
- Tucabia
- Tullymorgan
- Tyndale
- Tyringham
- Ulmarra
- Upper Copmanhurst
- Upper Corindi
- Upper Fine Flower
- Warragai Creek
- Warregah Island
- Waterview
- Waterview Heights
- Wells Crossing
- Whiteman Creek
- Winegrove
- Wombat Creek
- Woodford Island
- Woody Head
- Wooli
- Wooloweyah
- Woombah
- Yamba

== Heritage listings ==
The Clarence Valley Council has a number of heritage-listed sites, including:

- High Conservation Value Old Growth forest

== Demographics ==
At the 2011 census, there were 49,665 people in the Clarence Valley local government area, of these 49.4 per cent were male and 50.6 per cent were female. Aboriginal and Torres Strait Islander people made up 5.7 per cent of the population which is more than double the national and state averages of 2.5 per cent. The median age of people in the Clarence Valley Council area was 46 years; some 10 years higher than the national median. Children aged 0 – 14 years made up 18.6 per cent of the population and people aged 65 years and over made up 21.3 per cent of the population. Of people in the area aged 15 years and over, 49.3 per cen% were married and 14.6% were either divorced or separated.

Population growth in the Clarence Valley Council area between the 2006 census and the 2011 Census was 3.15 per cent. When compared with total population growth of Australia for the same period, being 8.32 per cent, population growth in the Clarence Valley local government area was lower than the national average. The median weekly income for residents within the Clarence Valley Council area was significantly below the national average, being one of the factors that place the Clarence Valley Council area in an area of social disadvantage.

At the 2011 Census, the proportion of residents in the Clarence Valley local government area who stated their ancestry as Australian or Anglo-Celtic exceeded 82 per cent of all residents (national average was 65.2 per cent). In excess of 64 per cent of all residents in the Clarence Valley Council area nominated a religious affiliation with Christianity at the 2011 Census, which was above the national average of 50.2 per cent. Meanwhile, as at the Census date, compared to the national average, households in the Clarence Valley local government area had a significantly lower than average proportion (3.1 per cent) where two or more languages are spoken (national average was 20.4 per cent); and a significantly higher proportion (94.0 per cent) where English only was spoken at home (national average was 76.8 per cent).

Selected historical census data for Clarence Valley local government area
Census year		2006	2011	2016
Population	Estimated residents on census night	48,146	49,665	50,671
Population	LGA rank in terms of size within New South Wales		46th	▲45th
Population	% of New South Wales population		0.72%	▼0.68%
Population	% of Australian population	0.24%	▼0.23%	▼0.22%
Cultural and language diversity				
Ancestry, top responses	Australian		34.6%	▼33.2%
Ancestry, top responses	English		31.9%	▼31.4%
Ancestry, top responses	Irish		9.0%	▲9.1%
Ancestry, top responses	Scottish		8.3%	▲8.6%
Ancestry, top responses	German		3.4%	3.4%
Language, top responses (other than English)	German	0.2%	0.2%	0.2%
Language, top responses (other than English)	Cantonese	0.1%	0.1%	0.1%
Language, top responses (other than English)	Spanish	n/c	▲0.1%	0.1%
Language, top responses (other than English)	Mandarin	n/c	n/c	▲0.1%
Language, top responses (other than English)	Dutch	0.1%	▲0.2%	▼0.1%
Religious affiliation				
Religious affiliation, top responses	No religion	15.3%	▲19.0%	▲26.4%
Religious affiliation, top responses	Anglican	32.0%	▼30.6%	▼25.7%
Religious affiliation, top responses	Catholic	22.5%	▼22.1%	▼20.0%
Religious affiliation, top responses	Not stated	n/c	n/c	▲10.4%
Religious affiliation, top responses	Presbyterian and Reformed	7.4%	▼6.7%	▼6.0%
Median weekly incomes				
Personal income	Median weekly personal income	A$333	A$396	A$477
Personal income	% of Australian median income	71.5%	▼68.6%	▲72.1%
Family income	Median weekly family income	A$631	A$924	A$1133
Family income	% of Australian median income	61.4%	▲62.4%	▲65.3%
Household income	Median weekly household income	A$781	A$768	A$910
Household income	% of Australian median income	66.7%	▼62.2%	▲63.3%

== Council ==
=== Current composition and election method ===
Clarence Valley Council is composed of nine councillors elected proportionally as one entire ward. All councillors are elected for a fixed four-year term of office. The mayor is elected by the councillors at the first meeting of the council. The most recent election was held on 14 September 2024, and the makeup of the council is as follows:

Party	Councillors
Independents	6
Independent National	2
Greens	1
Total	9

The current Council, elected in 2024, in order of election, is:

Councillor	Party	Notes
Cristie Yager	Independent	Councillor
Peter Johnstone	Independent National	Councillor
Greg Clancy	Greens	Deputy Mayor
Ray Smith	Independent	Mayor
Alison Whaites	Independent National	Councillor
Shane Causley	Independent	Councillor
Lynne Cairns	Independent	Councillor
Debrah Novak	Independent	Councillor
Karen Toms	Independent	Councillor

== Election results ==
=== 2024 ===
2024 New South Wales local elections: Clarence Valley
Party	Candidate	Votes	%	±%
Independent	Cristie Yager (elected)	4,773	15.0	
Independent National	Peter Johnstone (elected)	3,832	12.0	+4.8
Greens	Greg Clancy (elected)	2,998	9.4	+0.9
Independent	Ray Smith (elected)	2,486	7.8	
Independent	Shane Causley (elected)	2,432	7.6	
Independent National	Allison Whaites (elected)	2,318	7.3	−0.5
Independent	Lynne Cairns (elected)	2,057	6.5	
Independent	Debrah Novak (elected)	1,893	6.0	−5.8
Independent	Amanda Brien	1,556	4.9	
Independent	Karen Toms (elected)	1,435	4.5	−0.9
Independent	Andrew Baker	1,173	3.7	
Independent	Steve Pickering	1,144	3.6	−1.4
Independent	Melissa Hellwig	1,043	3.3	
Independent	James Allan	904	2.8	
Independent	Des Schroder	833	2.6	
Independent	Justin James	723	2.3	
Independent	Phillip Provest	234	0.7	
Total formal votes		31,834	90.8	−2.1
Informal votes		3,227	9.2	+2.1
Turnout		35,061	83.7	−2.0

=== 2021 ===
2021 New South Wales local elections: Clarence Valley
Party	Candidate	Votes	%	±%
Independent	Jeff Smith (elected)	6,022	19.6	
Independent	Debrah Novak (elected)	3,622	11.8	
Independent	Ian Tiley (elected)	2,637	8.6	
Independent National	Allison Whaites (elected)	2,403	7.8	
Independent	Bill Day (elected)	2,039	6.7	
Greens	Greg Clancy (elected)	2,592	8.5	
Independent National	Peter Johnstone (elected)	2,212	7.2	
Independent	Karen Toms (elected)	1,658	5.4	
Independent	Steve Pickering (elected)	1,536	5.0	
Independent Labor	Peter Ellem	1,494	4.9	
Independent	Ash Gibbons	1,189	3.9	
Independent	Pete Hanson	1,189	3.9	
Independent National	Donald Scott	702	2.3	
Independent	Phil Belletty	661	2.2	
Independent	Jeffrey Fuller	357	1.2	
Independent	Warren Lang	348	1.1	
Total formal votes		30,661	92.9	
Informal votes		2,358	7.1	
Turnout			85.7	
Party total votes
Independent		23,850	77.8	
Independent National		5,317	17.3	
Independent Labor		1,494	4.9	
Party total seats			Seats	±
Independent			7	Steady
Independent National			2	▲1
Independent Labor			0	▼1

== See also ==
- Local government areas of New South Wales
