= Copmanhurst, New South Wales =

Copmanhurst
- Town
- Coordinates: 29°35′S 152°47′E
- Country: Australia
- State: New South Wales
- LGA: Clarence Valley Council

Government
  - State electorate: Clarence
  - Federal division: Page

Population
  - Total: 334 (2021 census)
- Postcode: 2460

Copmanhurst is a small town in Clarence Valley Council, Northern Rivers region, New South Wales, Australia. At the 2016 census, it had a population of 304. 81.1% of people were born in Australia and 90.6% of people spoke only English at home.

== Settlement ==
Following the construction of the road from Grafton to Tenterfield in 1859, surveyors planned for a village on high ground near the second falls of the Clarence River. The naming of the village came from the Copmanhurst pastoral run that had been on the site. Progress was slow but by 1873 two hotels were opened within months of each other. It was originally situated along the river to make use of the local shipping trade- logs/beef cattle. In 1876 a petition was sent to the government over the construction of a wharf. After losing the village to floods the village was moved back up the hill.

In 1881 a police station was established and in 1891 a school for the local children was built.

The village was a thriving village in the 1900s with the associated logging and cattle trade. The village has become increasingly popular as a place to reside as people seek out the 'tree change' and lower housing prices.

== Facilities ==
The village has an infants and primary school and community preschool as well as the usual Australian pub- Restpoint Hotel. The pub also operates as the local post office (for 2 hours a day) and has recently opened a small shop to replace the local store which closed in 2022. The village has a high rate of home ownership compared to the state average and blocks of land are larger than standard house blocks. Many of the families in Copmanhurst have been residing in the village over generations and have extended family residing in the village. An annual campdraft is held at the local showground. The river is a popular spot for camping, canoeing and kayaking.
