= Yuraygir National Park =

National park in New South Wales, Australia

- IUCN category II (national park)
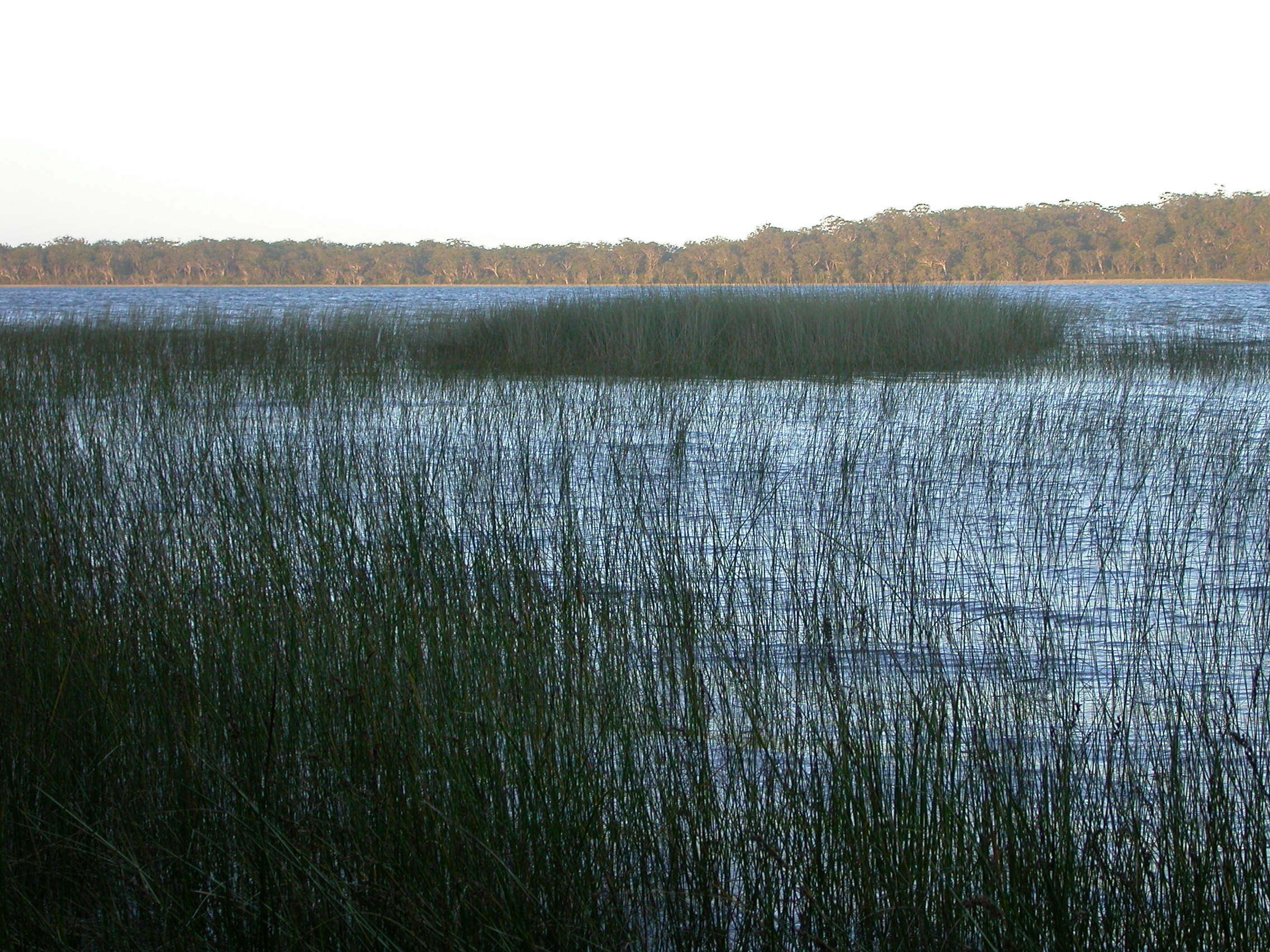
- Minnie Water Lake

- Location within New South Wales
- Location: New South Wales
- Coordinates: 29°54′19″S 153°13′37″E
- Area: 313.71 km^{2} (121.12 sq mi)
- Established: 1980
- Governing body: New South Wales National Parks and Wildlife Service

Yuraygir is a national park in New South Wales, Australia, located 482 km (300 mi) northeast of Sydney. It was created in 1980, a result of the merger and enlargement of two national parks, Angourie and Red Rock National Parks, both of which had been established in 1975. At the time of its establishment in 1980, the park was fragmented, and parcels of land were bought over the following two decades to unite segments into a more contiguous protected area. Sometimes these acquisitions required protracted negotiations (and legal disputes) with land owners.

== Etymology ==
The name is a phonetic translation of the local indigenous tribe who had lived in the area, and had formerly been transcribed variously as Jeigir, Jiegera, Jungai, Yagir, Yegera, Yegir, Yiegera or Youngai.

== Description ==
Covering 65 km (40 mi) of coastline, it is the largest coastal park in New South Wales. The Yuraygir coastal walk traverses the coastline, and takes four days to complete. There are 48 beaches, including the highly regarded 800-metre (2,600 ft)-long Shelley Beach.

Thirty species of mammal have been recorded within the park, including the threatened rufous bettong (Aepyprymnus rufescens), tiger quoll (Dasyurus maculatus), brush-tailed phascogale (Phascogale tapoatafa) and squirrel glider (Petaurus norfolcensis). Swamps and wet heath are habitat for the threatened eastern ground parrot (Pezoporus wallicus) and eastern grass owl (Tyto longimembris).

Pests include feral pigs, cats, dogs and horses, and foxes, while problem weeds include groundsel bush (Baccharis halimifolia), bitou bush (Chrysanthemoides monilifera subsp. rotunda), lantana (Lantana camara) and slash pine (Pinus elliottii).

== See also ==
- Protected areas of New South Wales
- High Conservation Value Old Growth forest
