= Broadmeadow railway station =

Railway station in New South Wales, Australia

Broadmeadow
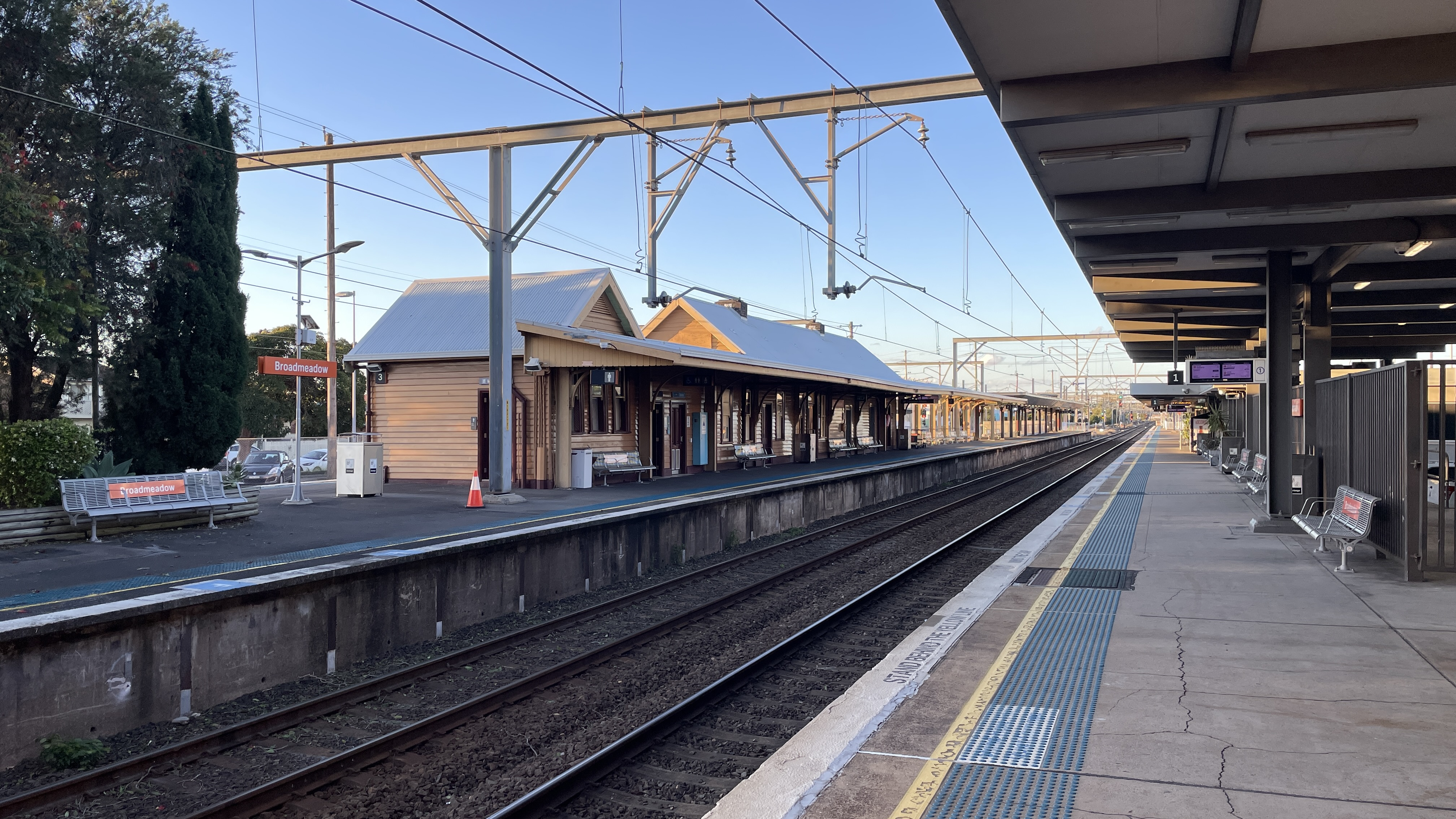
- Northbound view on Platform

General information
- Location: Graham Road, Broadmeadow; Australia
- Coordinates: 32°55′23″S 151°44′04″E
- Owner: Transport Asset Manager of New South Wales
- Operator: Sydney Trains
- Line: Main Northern
- Distance: 162.94 km (101.25 mi) from Central
- Platforms: 3 (1 side, 1 island)
- Tracks: 4
- Connections: Bus; Coach

Construction
- Structure type: Ground
- Accessible: Yes

Other information
- Status: Staffed
- Station code: BMD
- Website: Transport for NSW

History
- Opened: 15 August 1887; 139 years ago

Passengers
- 2025: 472,951 (year); 1,296 (daily) (Sydney Trains, NSW TrainLink)

Services
Preceding station	Intercity Trains	Following station
Hamilton towards Newcastle Interchange	Central Coast & Newcastle Line	Adamstown towards Central
Hamilton towards Newcastle Interchange	Central Coast & Newcastle Line Express	Cardiff towards Central
Preceding station	NSW TrainLink	Following station
Maitland towards Grafton, Casino or Brisbane	NSW TrainLink North Coast Line	Fassifern towards Sydney
Maitland towards Moree or Armidale	NSW TrainLink North Western Line	Fassifern towards Sydney
Location

Broadmeadow railway station is a heritage-listed railway station and major regional interchange located on the Main Northern line in New South Wales, Australia. The station itself serves the Newcastle suburb of Broadmeadow. The station was first opened on 15 August 1887.

The island platform was accessed by a level crossing at the station's northern end until replaced by an underpass on 2 March 1973 opened by Minister for Transport Milton Morris. The station was upgraded to wheelchair accessibility in July 2017.

Following the electrification of the line from Wyong in June 1984, passenger trains including the Brisbane Limited, Gold Coast Motorail, Grafton Express, North Coast Daylight Express, North Coast Overnight Express, Northern Mail and Northern Tablelands Express changed from electric to diesel traction at Broadmeadow.

== Platforms and services ==
Broadmeadow has three platforms, one island platform with two faces and a side platform. It is serviced by Sydney Trains Intercity Central Coast & Newcastle Line services travelling between Sydney Central, Gosford and Newcastle.

It is also serviced by NSW TrainLink Xplorer and XPT long-distance services between Sydney, Armidale, Moree, Casino and Brisbane, as well as daily coach services to and from Taree. These coach services are operated by Busways as routes 150 and 151.

Platform	Line	Stopping pattern	Notes
1	Central Coast & Newcastle Line	Services to Gosford & Sydney Central	
1	North Coast Region	Services to Sydney Central	
1	North Western Region	Services to Sydney Central	
2	Central Coast & Newcastle Line	Services to Newcastle	
2	North Coast Region	Services to Casino & Brisbane	
2	North Western Region	Services to Armidale/Moree	
3	The Great Southern	Services to Acacia Ridge or Adelaide Parklands Terminal	

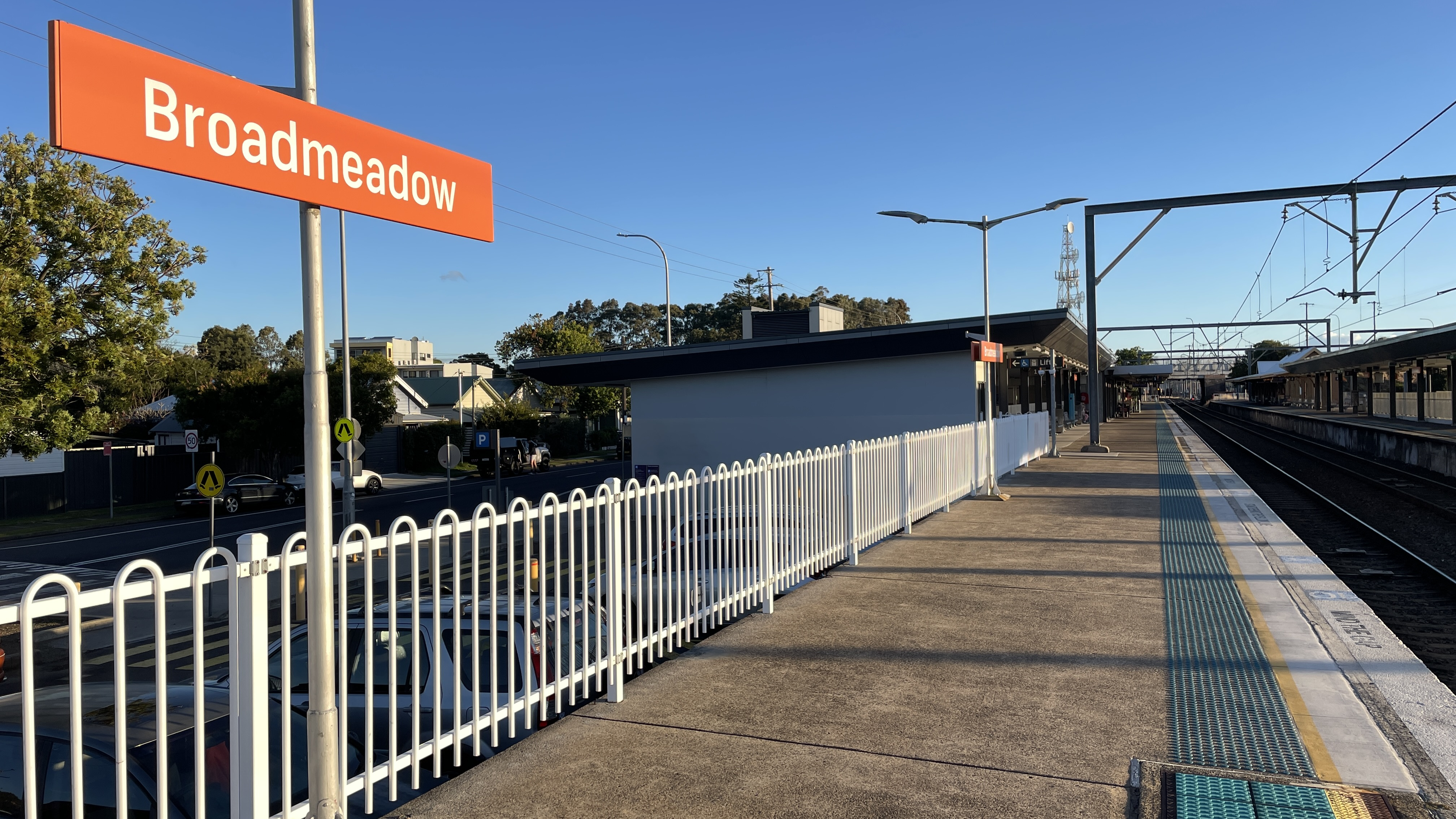
Southbound view on Platform 1

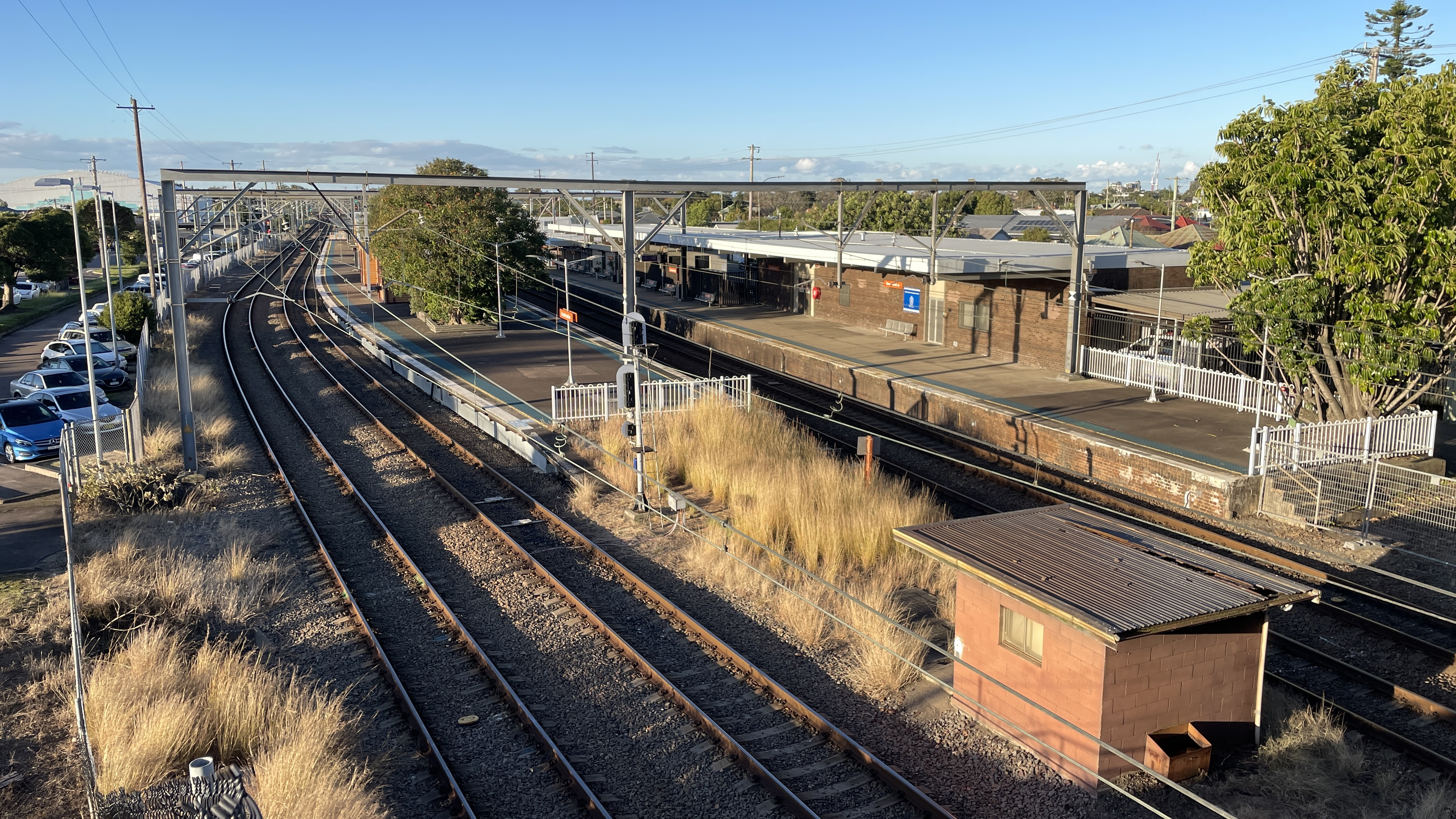
Northbound view of platforms, June 2025

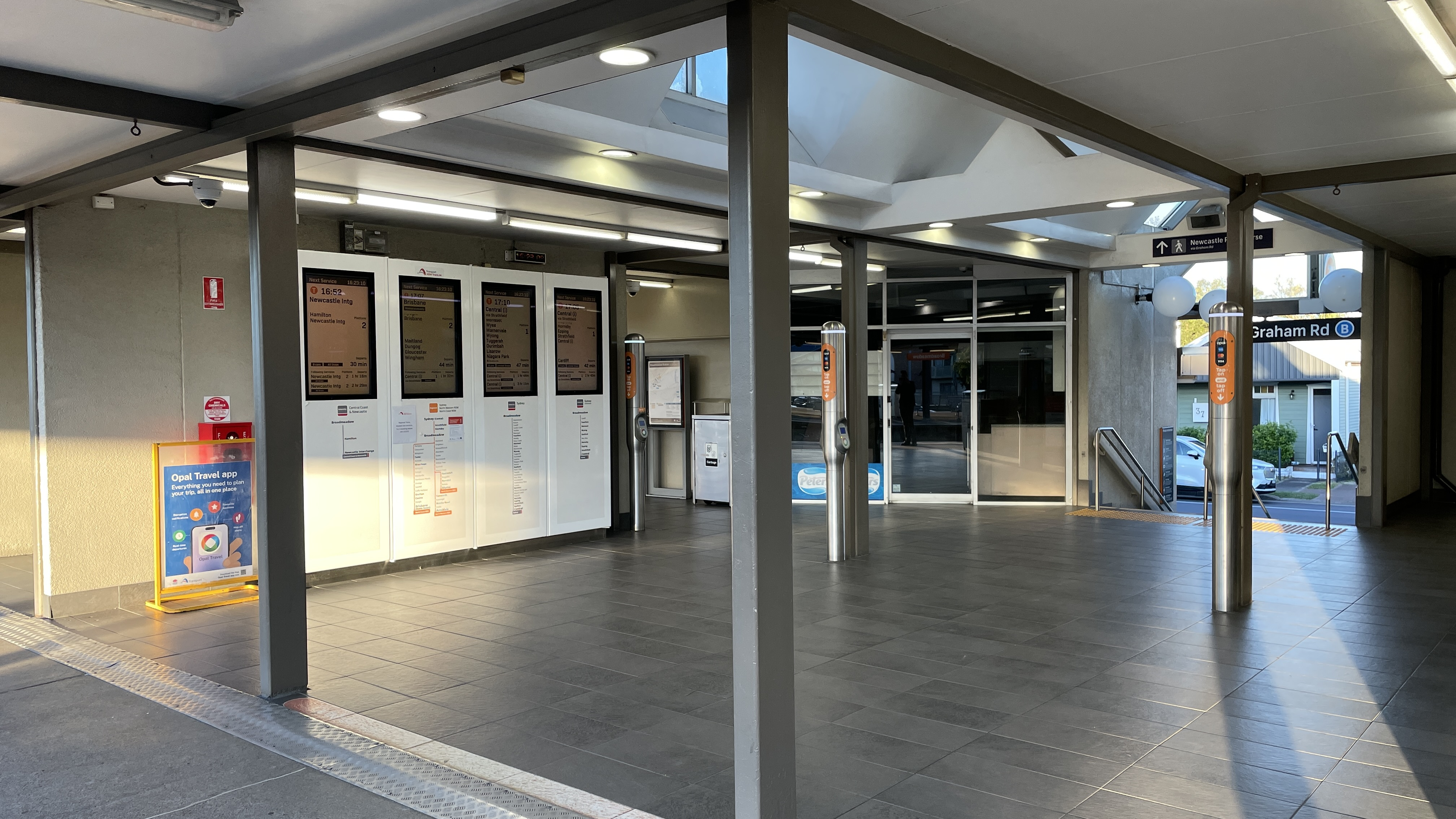
Concourse

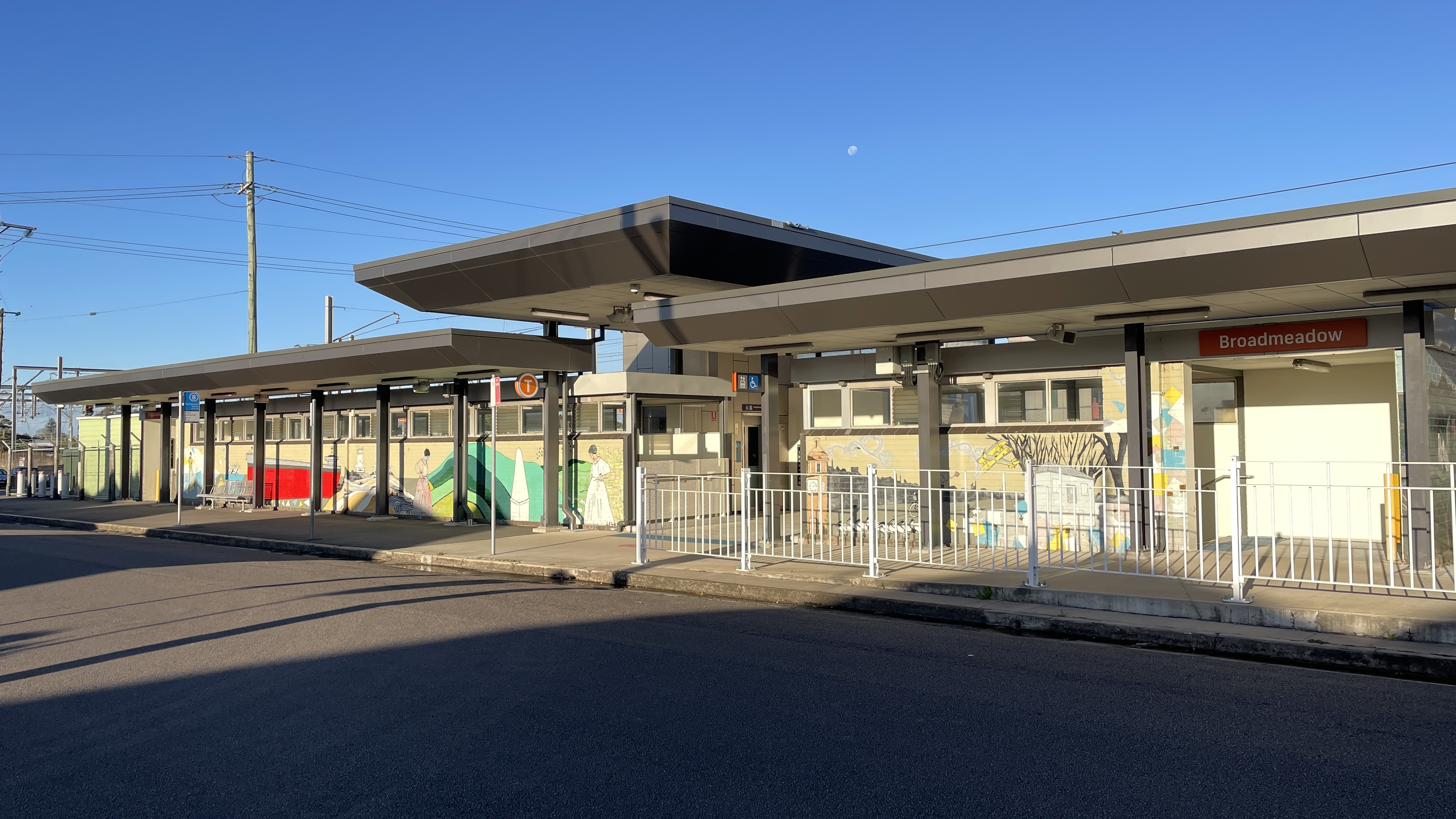
Entrance on Bound Road

== Transport links ==
Newcastle Transport operates four bus routes via Broadmeadow station, under contract to Transport for NSW:

- 21: Broadmeadow to Newcastle East via Merewether
- 25: Broadmeadow to Charlestown via Kotara
- 27: Broadmeadow to Wallsend via University of Newcastle
- 28: Newcastle West to Mount Hutton via Newcastle Interchange

NSW TrainLink operates one coach route via Broadmeadow station:

- 135: Broadmeadow to Taree (weekdays only)

Busways operates two coach routes via Broadmeadow station, under contract to Transport for NSW:

- 150: Newcastle Interchange to Taree via Hawks Nest, Forster & Tuncurry
- 151: Newcastle Interchange to Taree via Forster & Tuncurry

== Signal boxes ==
The Australian Rail Track Corporation's Broadmeadow Centralised Traffic Control centre for the northern half of the state including the North Coast line to Brisbane, is located just south of the station, as is Transport Asset Holding Entity's Broadmeadow signal box which controls the Broadmeadow to Eraring section of the Main Northern line.

== Yard ==
South of the station lies the extensive Broadmeadow yard. NSW TrainLink have a depot that maintains its Endeavour and Hunter railcar fleets. The former Broadmeadow Locomotive Depot is used to house preserved rolling stock.
