= Wingham railway station, New South Wales =

Australian railway station

Wingham
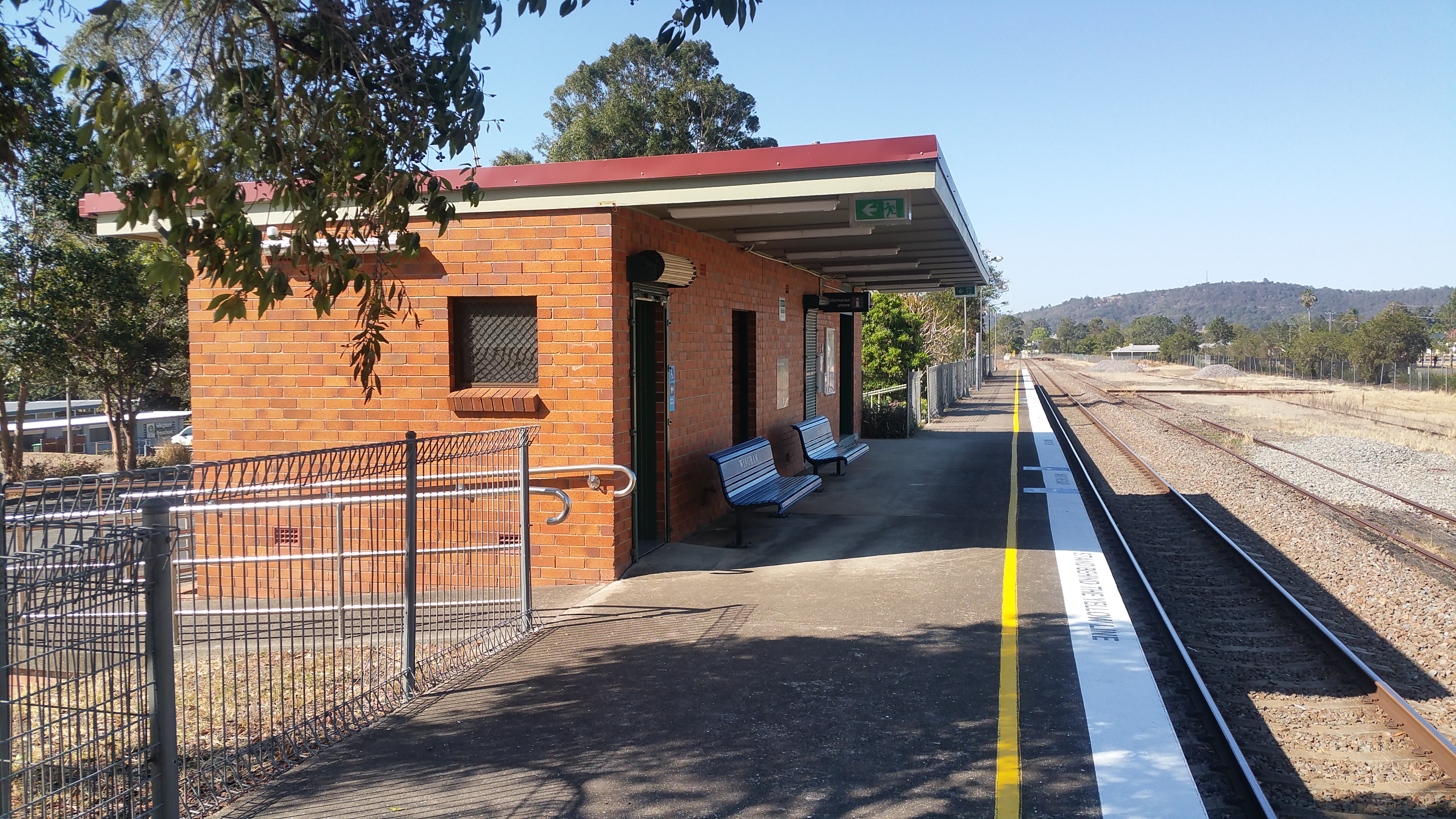
- Station platform, September 2017

General information
- Location: Price Street, Wingham
- Coordinates: 31°52′05″S 152°22′03″E
- System: Side platform
- Owner: Transport Asset Manager of New South Wales
- Operator: NSW TrainLink
- Line: North Coast
- Distance: 367.10 km (228.11 mi) from Central
- Platforms: 1

Construction
- Structure type: Ground

Other information
- Station code: WGM

History
- Opened: 5 February 1913; 113 years ago

Services
Preceding station	NSW TrainLink	Following station
Taree towards Grafton, Casino or Brisbane	NSW TrainLink North Coast Line	Gloucester towards Sydney
Location

Wingham railway station is located on the North Coast line in New South Wales, Australia. It serves the town of Wingham, opening on 5 February 1913 when the line was extended from Dungog to Taree.

== Platforms and services ==
Wingham has one platform with a passing loop opposite. Each day northbound XPT services operate to Casino and Brisbane, with two southbound services operating to Sydney. This station is a request stop for the northbound Brisbane XPT and the southbound Casino XPT. so these services only stop here if passengers have booked to board/alight here.

Platform	Line	Stopping pattern	Notes
1	North Coast Region	services to Sydney Central, Casino & Brisbane	request stop for these services: northbound Brisbane XPT & southbound Casino XPT (booked passengers only)

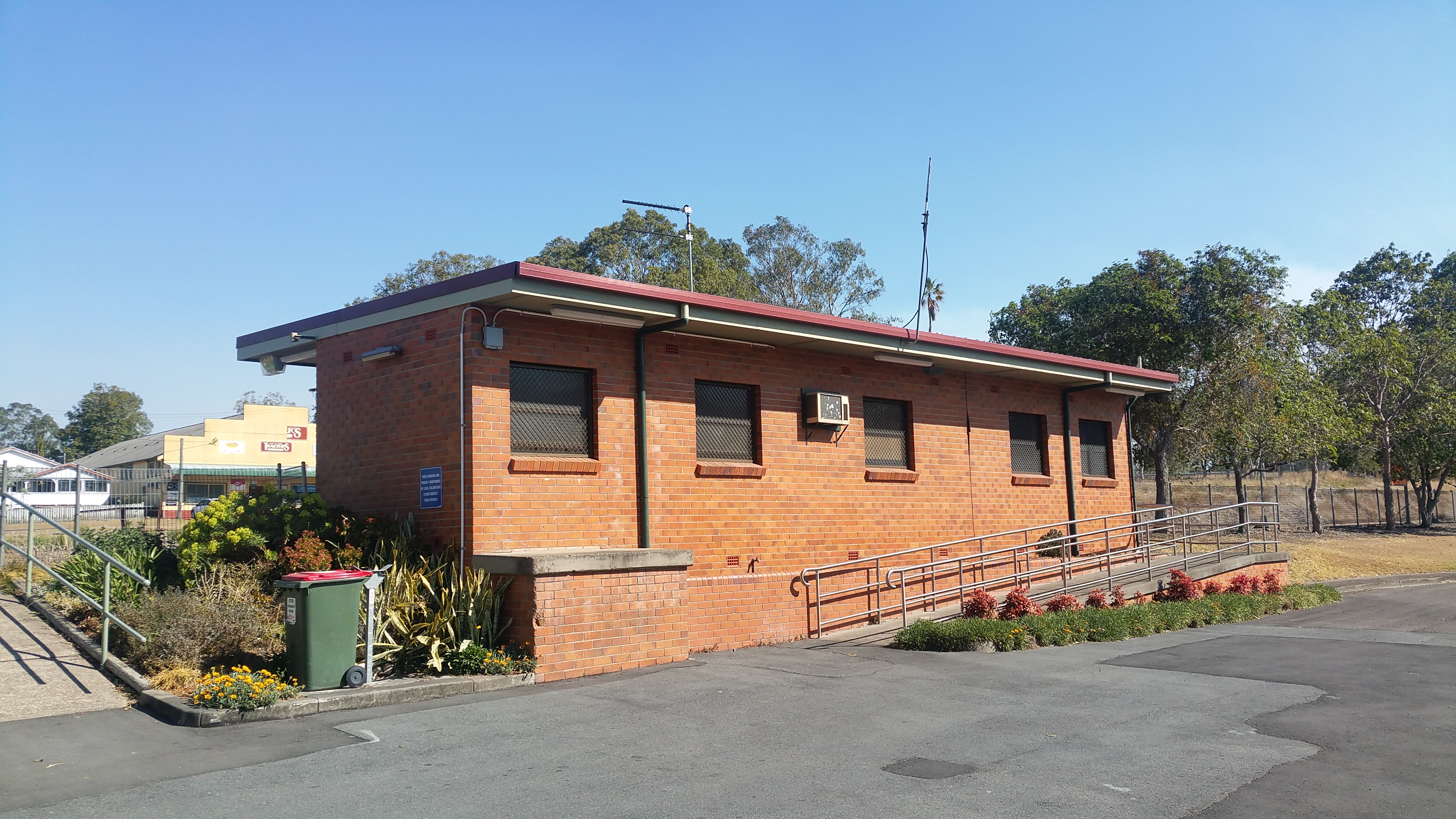
Exterior of station building seen from carpark

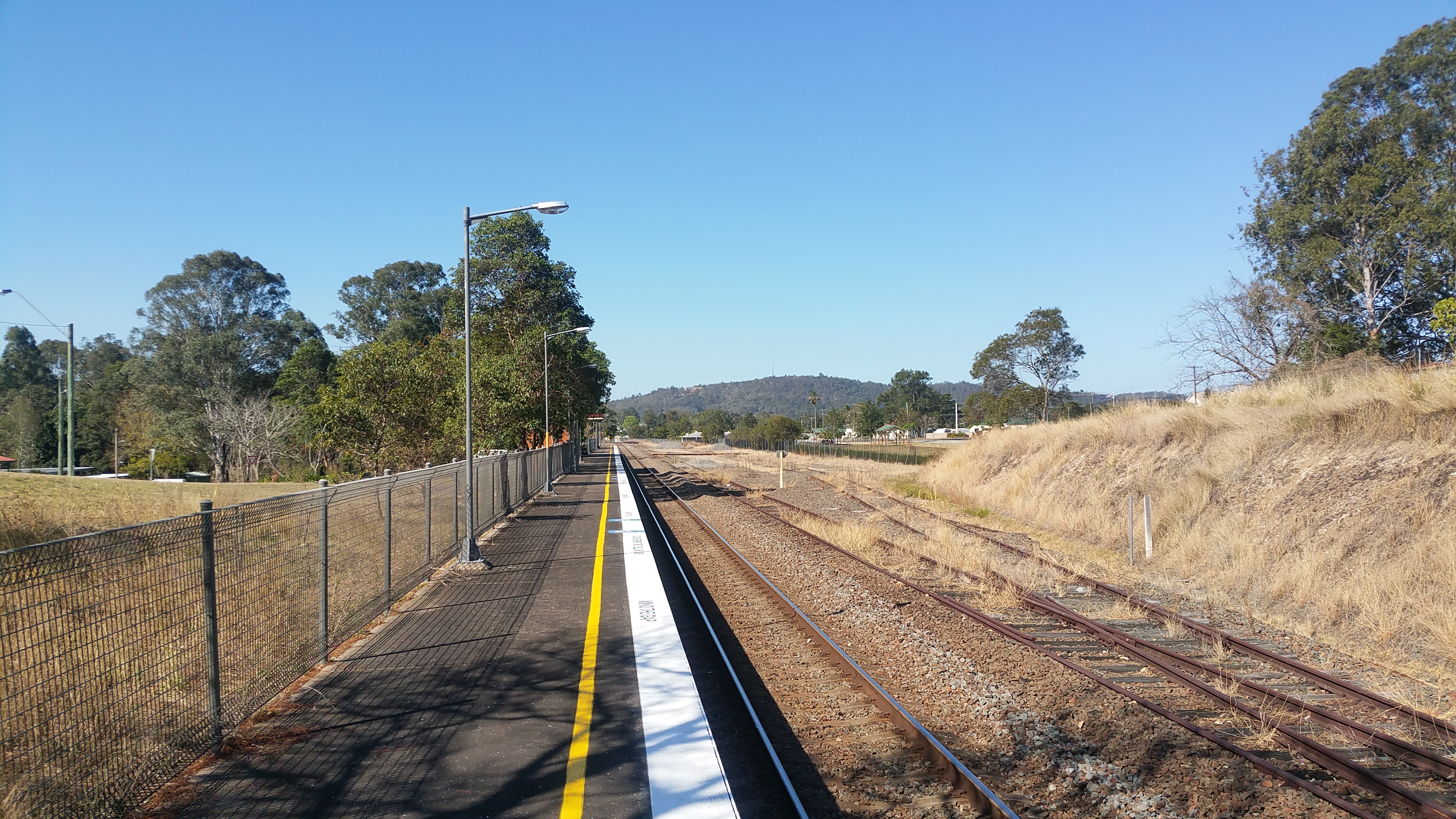
Northbound view on the platform

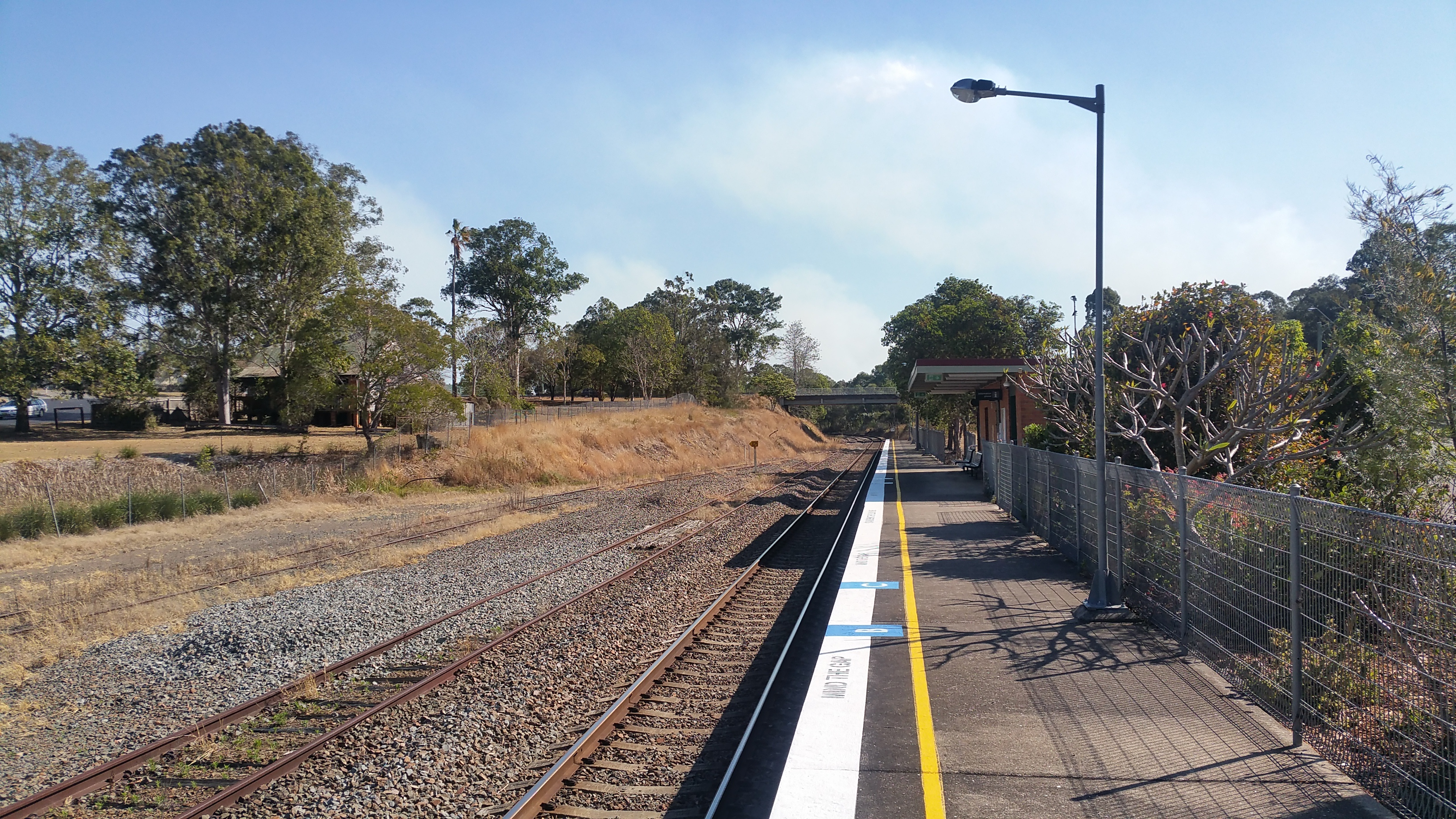
Southbound view on the platform
