= Grafton railway station =

Grafton railway station may refer to:

- Grafton railway station, Auckland, a current station on Auckland's Western Line in New Zealand
- Grafton railway station, New South Wales, a current station on the North Coast line in Australia
- Grafton station (MBTA), a commuter rail station in Grafton, Massachusetts, United States
- Old Grafton railway station, a former station on the North Coast line in Australia
- Grafton and Burbage railway station, a former station on the Midland & South Western Junction Railway in England
