= Nooroo railway station =

Former railway station in New South Wales, Australia

Nooroo

General information
- Location: Stroud Hill Road, Nooroo; New South Wales; Australia
- Coordinates: 32°21′36″S 151°53′57″E
- Operator: Public Transport Commission
- Line: North Coast
- Distance: 262.852 km (163.329 mi) from Central
- Platforms: 1 (1 side)
- Tracks: 1

Construction
- Structure type: Ground

Other information
- Status: Demolished

History
- Opened: 5 February 1913 (113 years ago)
- Closed: 29 June 1975 (51 years ago)

Services
Preceding station	Former services	Following station
Stroud Road towards Brisbane	North Coast Line	Dingadee towards Maitland
Location

Nooroo railway station was a regional railway station on the North Coast line, serving the Mid North Coast locality of Nooroo. It was open for passenger services between 1913 and 1975.

== History ==
The extension of the North Coast railway line from Dungog to Taree was carried out in the early 1910s. Originally, only a siding was planned at Nooroo, however in early 1912 a petition was launched by local residents to have a proper station built instead. The petition was successful and a platform and small goods shed were constructed.

Nooroo station opened on 5 February 1913. A railway gang set up to engage in drainage work along the North Coast line was based at the station in 1935. Drinking water and food supplies were provided for the workers.

On 14 June 1954, 15 trucks from a goods train derailed on the northern side of Nooroo station resulting in the shutdown of the line near Nooroo. A shuttle replacement bus service was operated between Stroud Road and Nooroo for passengers travelling south, who were then transferred to rail services at both stations. A replacement bus ran from Dungog to Stroud Road for passengers travelling north. The debris from the derailment was cleared off the tracks the following day to allow regular services to resume.

The station closed to all services on 29 June 1975 and was subsequently demolished. A modern signalling hut is located at the site of the former station.

== Description ==
A single track ran through the station which itself consisted of a small single side platform. A goods shed and siding were also located at the station, As well as this, a level crossing was provided nearby which was closed on 25 May 1971.
