= Dingadee railway station =

Former railway station in New South Wales, Australia

Dingadee

General information
- Location: Monkerai Road, Fosterton; New South Wales; Australia
- Coordinates: 32°22′13″S 151°47′25″E
- Operator: Public Transport Commission
- Line: North Coast
- Distance: 219.789 km (136.571 mi) from Central
- Platforms: 1 (1 side)
- Tracks: 1

Construction
- Structure type: Ground

Other information
- Status: Demolished

History
- Opened: 5 February 1913 (113 years ago)
- Closed: 29 June 1975 (51 years ago)

Services
Preceding station	Former services	Following station
Nooroo towards Brisbane	North Coast Line	Dungog towards Maitland
Location

Dingadee railway station was a regional railway station located on the North Coast line, serving the Hunter Valley locality of Fosterton. It opened in 1913 when the North Coast line was extended from Dungog to Taree and closed to passenger services in 1975. The only trace that remains is a signalling hut.
