= Amarina railway station =

Former railway station in New South Wales, Australia

Amarina

General information
- Location: Amarina Road, Coombell; New South Wales; Australia
- Coordinates: 28°59′01″S 152°58′55″E
- Operator: Public Transport Commission
- Line: North Coast
- Distance: 788.955 km (490.234 mi) from Central
- Platforms: 1 (1 side)
- Tracks: 1

Construction
- Structure type: Ground

Other information
- Status: Demolished

History
- Opened: May 1908 (118 years ago)
- Closed: 28 April 1975 (51 years ago)

Services
Preceding station	Former services	Following station
Leeville towards Brisbane	North Coast Line	Coombell towards Maitland
Location

Amarina railway station was a regional railway station located on the North Coast line, serving the Northern Rivers locality of Coombell. The station opened as an infill station in May 1908, with passenger services ceasing on 28 April 1975.

The name Amarina is reportedly taken from the Bundjalung language word for rain, however, this is considered unlikely as Bundjalung language words do not generally start with a vowel.
