= North Coast railway line =

North Coast railway line may refer to:

- North Coast railway line, New South Wales, the main railway link between Sydney and Brisbane
- North Coast railway line, Queensland, the main railway line between Brisbane and Cairns
