= Karangi, New South Wales =

Karangi New South Wales
- Coordinates: 30°15′15″S 153°02′51″E
- Population: 515 (2021 census)
- Postcode(s): 2450
- LGA(s): City of Coffs Harbour
- State electorate(s): Coffs Harbour
- Federal division(s): Cowper

Karangi is a town located 10 minutes west of Coffs Harbour in New South Wales, Australia. At the 2021 census, Karangi had a population of 515 people.

In the early 20th century gold was mined in the area, especially at Mt Brown.

== Schools ==
- Karangi Public School

Preceding station	Former services	Following station
Coramba towards Brisbane	North Coast Line	Coffs Harbour towards Maitland

== See also ==
- Convincing ground
