= Coffs Harbour railway station =

Australian railway station

Coffs Harbour
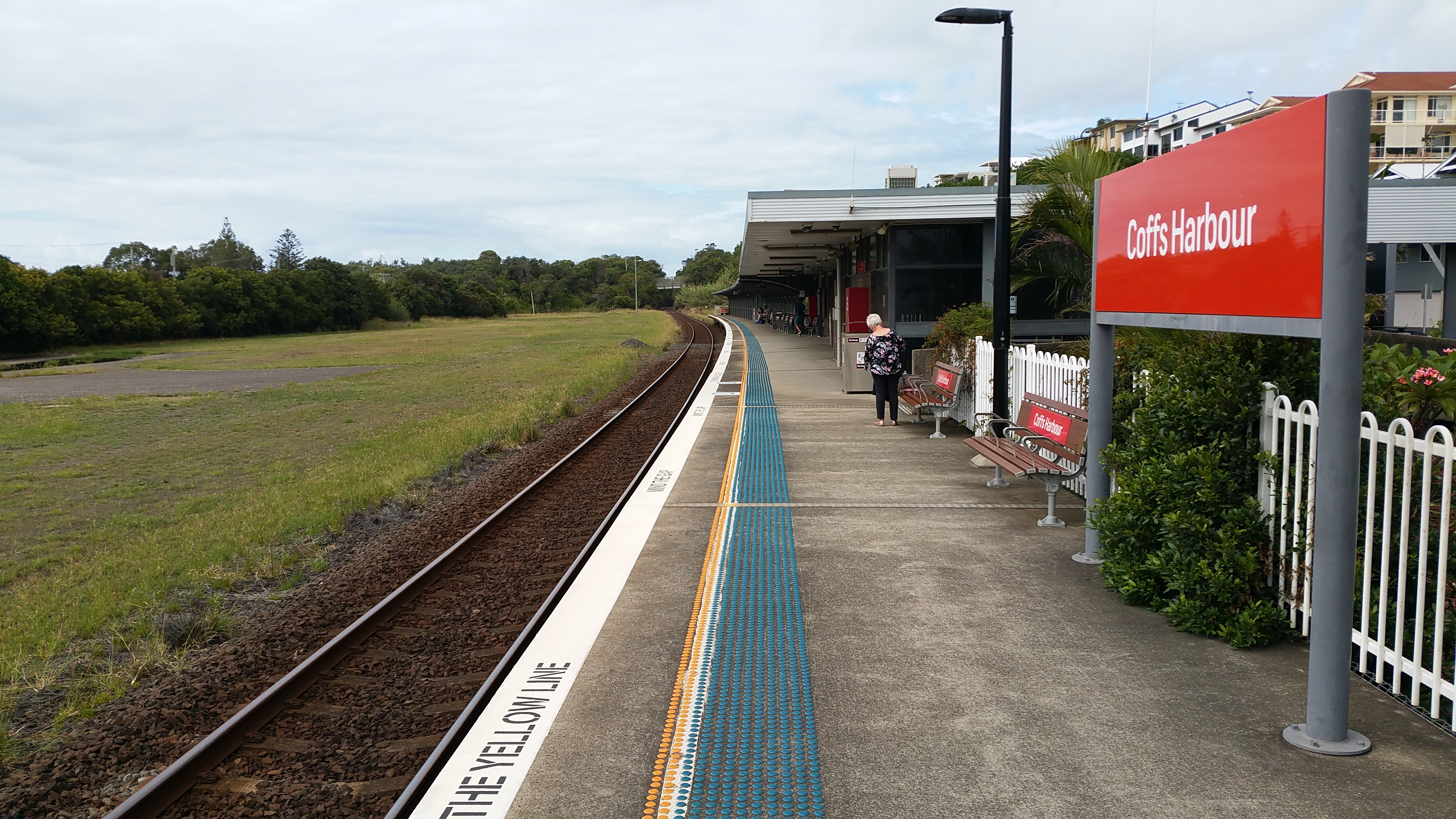
- Station platform, February 2019

General information
- Location: Angus McLeod Place, Coffs Harbour
- Coordinates: 30°18′22″S 153°08′16″E
- Elevation: 8 metres (26 ft)
- Owner: Transport Asset Manager of New South Wales
- Operator: NSW TrainLink
- Line: North Coast
- Distance: 607.81 km (377.68 mi) from Central
- Platforms: 1
- Tracks: 1

Construction
- Structure type: Ground
- Accessible: Yes

Other information
- Station code: CFS

History
- Opened: 30 August 1915; 110 years ago

Services
Preceding station	NSW TrainLink	Following station
Grafton towards Grafton, Casino or Brisbane	NSW TrainLink North Coast Line	Sawtell towards Sydney
Former services
Preceding station	Former services	Following station
Former NSW Main line services
Karangi towards Brisbane	North Coast Line	Boambee towards Maitland
Location

Coffs Harbour railway station is located on the North Coast line in New South Wales, Australia. It serves the city of Coffs Harbour, opening on 30 August 1915.

The present station building opened in October 1971. In 1996, the freight yard and crossing loop opposite the station closed.

On 29 and 30 August 2015, a commemorative event was held to celebrate the station's 100th birthday with visiting steam locomotive 5917 from Lachlan Valley Railway.

== Platforms and services ==
Coffs Harbour has one platform. A goods yard previously existed opposite the station, but has since been removed. Each day northbound XPT services operate to Casino and Brisbane, with two southbound services operating to Sydney.

Platform	Line	Stopping pattern	Notes
1	North Coast Region	services to Sydney Central, Casino & Brisbane	
