= Rappville, New South Wales =

Rappville
- Town
- Coordinates: 29°5′S 152°57′E
- Country: Australia
- State: New South Wales
- Region: Northern Rivers
- LGA: Richmond Valley Council
- Location: 230 km (140 mi) S of Brisbane; 68 km (42 mi) SW of Lismore; 87 km (54 mi) n of Grafton

Government
  - State electorate: Clarence
  - Federal division: Page
- Elevation: 51 m (167 ft)

Population
  - Total: 169 (2016 census)
- Postcode: 2469
- County: Richmond
- Parish: Nandabah
Localities around Rappville
Casino
Rappville	Woodburn
Whiporie

Rappville is a small village in the Northern Rivers region of New South Wales, Australia and it sits within the Richmond Valley Council local government area. It is 32 kilometres (20 mi) from the regional centre of Casino.

The Traditional Owners of Rappville, and its surrounds, are the Galibal people of the Bundjalung Nation.

At the 2016 census, Rappville recorded a population of 169 people.

== History ==
The district in which Rappville is situated was initially developed by European settlers for cattle grazing (for example the very extensive Wooroowoolga Station) and forestry (first, cedar getting, then other species) from the 1840s onwards; to these rural industries was added dairying, which became an important component from the 1860s for almost the next 100 years. Initially, rural products were transported by road and the network of navigable rivers, however in 1903 the small but growing North Coast railway line reached Casino and two years later was extended south to Grafton. A sawmiller named John Murray established his sawmill by the new railway in an area initially called Murray's Siding, to exploit both the local supply of timber and the onward rail connections first to Casino and thence to the then inland port town of Lismore, sited at the highest navigable point of an arm of the Richmond (later renamed Wilsons) River. It appears that whole logs were also loaded for downstream milling, as may be judged by the following item appearing in the Sydney Morning Herald for 15 November 1906:

LARGE TIMBER TRAIN.

LISMORE, Wednesday.

A special timber train, which arrived here from Murray's siding, Grafton-Casino line, consisted of 13 eight-wheel waggons and six other vehicles. It was the longest and heaviest timber train seen here. Two engines were used to bring the train from Casino. The consignment, about 400 tons, was for the Richmond River Timber Company. About 400 tons of log timber are brought in weekly, 37 to 40 miles, for that company, and the British-Australia Company's mills, formerly Dorrough's. Large quantities of timber are obtained from other sources.

With the thriving timber cutting, sawmilling, and outbound timber supply industry, the nucleus of a new settlement grew up around the siding which by 1910 contained a butcher, a blacksmith, a small store, a school (opened in 1908), a church (opened in 1910, dedicated in 1911) and a bakery; it was formally gazetted as "Rappville" in March 1911, named after a prominent early settler and businessman Henry Rapp, who first selected land in the area in 1888. In the same year, Rapp opened his new Commercial Hotel, designed by the local architectural firm of Popplewell and Sykes, on a site opposite the small Rappville Railway Station. (By 1923 the rail link was extended south to Sydney and by 1930 to north to Brisbane, opening up the whole of the north coast of New South Wales to rail traffic); Rapp's Commercial Hotel operated using the licence from a previous establishment of the same name owned by his wife's mother in the neighbouring settlement of Myrtle Creek, of which virtually nothing now remains. 1911 also saw construction of a new railway station allowing passengers to alight and take their lunches at the newly constructed hotel and adjacent tea rooms. Other businesses in the village included a second butcher, an ice works, a second produce store and a branch of the Bank of New South Wales which also operated as a post office.

Through to the 1930s the village was fairly prosperous but has declined since then, in part because of a move of much passenger and freight traffic from rail to road as well as the gradual reduction of the timber industry. In 1997, a community workshop/discussion session in the village as input to the North East New South Wales Regional Forest Agreement identified additional factors contributing to population decline since the 1980s including the increased difficulty of making a living from cattle grazing, the closure of nearby cattle yards and small timber mills, the loss of railway/sleeper workers following the closure of a local railway sleeper yard in 1987, and the loss of customers visiting the pub following the introduction of new drink-driving laws; however this was partially offset by the establishment of commercial tea tree plantations in the region as well as a modest influx of newcomers from the city attracted by cheap land prices in the area.

The Sydney-Brisbane railway line continues to pass through the village, although the station has long closed and associated buildings have since disappeared. The most prominent building in the village is still the Commercial Hotel, also known as the Rappville Pub. The village also contains a post office, a hall, an Anglican church (St. John's, which celebrated its Centenary in 2011) and a primary school. The hotel was due to be closed in 2016 on account of difficulty in meeting current fire regulations, but is presently (2019) open and under restoration, having changed hands in 2017. In 2008, the village played host to the film crew of the popular U.K. Television series "Heartbeat" who filmed parts of two episodes at the Hotel, as part of a plotline which took the cast and crew to Australia following a murder mystery.

An additional local item of interest is the remains of a bush tea tree still: distillation of tea tree oil from native bushes was a subsidiary occupation for farmers in the area, until it was replaced by production from commercial plantations in the 1970s. Commercial cultivation of the local tea tree plant, Melaleuca alternifolia, which is native to the area and thrives in the flat, seasonally swampy habitat that surrounds Rappville, is now very successful. In a 2013 article, Main Camp Natural Extracts near Rappville was described as "the world's largest commercial plantation" of tea tree for oil, with 1,500 hectares of tea tree under production at its peak, with half of that figure remaining as at 2013; according to the company's website in 2019, its Myrtle Creek property currently spans some 4,300 ha and using sustainable practices, regenerates over 30 million tea trees each year on laser leveled land.

The area which includes Rappville lies in the traditional lands of the Aboriginal Bundjalung Nation, and contained speakers of the Birrihn (or Biriin) dialect.

=== 2019 bushfire disaster ===
In October 2019 the village was devastated as a destructive bushfire that started in Busbys Flat raced through the residential area, leading to the loss of at least 15 houses although no lives were believed to have been lost. The village's pub and primary school were saved although the hall was destroyed. The fire also resulted in significant damage to the Sydney-Brisbane railway line, loss of local power and telecommunications infrastructure, and closure of adjacent highways to traffic in several places.

== Bibliography ==
- Gardiner, Jane. 2007. Richmond Valley Council Community-Based Heritage Study, Volume 1: Co-ordinator's Report to the Richmond Valley Council. 96 pp. Available online at https://richmondvalley.nsw.gov.au/wp-content/uploads/2018/09/137833_Richmond_Valley_Heritage_Study.pdf

Preceding station	Former services	Following station
Coombell towards Brisbane	North Coast Line	Myrtle Creek towards Maitland
