= Nooroo =

Former railway station in New South Wales, Australia

Coordinates: 32.369°S 151.874°E

Nooroo is a locality in northern New South Wales, Australia, northwest of the town of Stroud. A railway station on the North Coast railway line served the locality between 1913 and 1975.
