= Myrtle Creek railway station =

Former railway station in New South Wales, Australia

Myrtle Creek

General information
- Location: Myrtle Creek Road, Myrtle Creek; New South Wales; Australia
- Coordinates: 29°06′39″S 152°56′44″E
- Operator: Department of Railways
- Line: North Coast
- Distance: 773.416 km (480.578 mi) from Central
- Platforms: 1 (1 side)
- Tracks: 1

Construction
- Structure type: Ground

Other information
- Status: Demolished

History
- Opened: 6 November 1905 (120 years ago)
- Closed: April 1941 (85 years ago)

Services
Preceding station	Former services	Following station
Rappville towards Brisbane	North Coast Line	Clearfield towards Maitland
Location

Myrtle Creek railway station was a regional railway station on the North Coast line, serving the Northern Rivers locality of Myrtle Creek. The station was opened on 6 November 1905, with services ceasing in April 1941. No traces of the station remain.
