= Clearfield railway station, New South Wales =

Town in New South Wales, Australia

Clearfield

General information
- Location: Clearfield Road, Clearfield; New South Wales; Australia
- Coordinates: 29°08′32″S 152°56′07″E
- Operator: Public Transport Commission
- Line: North Coast
- Distance: 769.724 km (478.284 mi) from Central
- Platforms: 1 (1 side)
- Tracks: 1

Construction
- Structure type: Ground

Other information
- Status: Demolished

History
- Opened: 6 November 1905 (120 years ago)
- Closed: 6 November 1974 (51 years ago)
- Former names: Watertank (1905–1913)

Services
Preceding station	Former services	Following station
Myrtle Creek towards Brisbane	North Coast Line	Ampdale towards Maitland
Location

Clearfield railway station was a regional railway station located on the North Coast line, serving the Northern Rivers locality of Clearfield. The station was opened on 6 November 1905 as Watertank, and was renamed Clearfield on 11 March 1913. Between 1943 and 1953, the Mount Neville passing loop was located south of the station. Clearfield closed to passenger services in 1974 and was subsequently demolished.
