= Ampdale railway station =

Former railway station in New South Wales, Australia

Ampdale

General information
- Location: Camira, New South Wales; Australia
- Coordinates: 29.2070°S 152.9445°E
- Operator: Public Transport Commission
- Line: North Coast
- Distance: 761.899 km (473.422 mi) from Central
- Platforms: 1 (1 side)

Construction
- Structure type: Ground

Other information
- Status: Closed

History
- Opened: February 1935
- Closed: 28 June 1975

Services
Preceding station	Former services	Following station
Clearfield towards Brisbane	North Coast Line	Camira Creek towards Maitland
Location

Ampdale railway station was a regional railway station on the North Coast railway line, serving the locality of Camira in the Northern Rivers region of New South Wales, Australia. The station was opened in 1935 and closed in 1974.
