= Coombell railway station =

Former railway station in New South Wales, Australia

Coombell

General information
- Location: Coombell; New South Wales; Australia
- Coordinates: 29°00′55″S 152°58′21″E
- Operator: Public Transport Commission
- Line: North Coast
- Distance: 785.174 km (487.885 mi) from Central
- Platforms: 1 (1 side)
- Tracks: 1

Construction
- Structure type: Ground

Other information
- Status: Demolished

History
- Opened: 6 November 1905 (120 years ago)
- Closed: 30 June 1974 (52 years ago)

Services
Preceding station	Former services	Following station
Amarina towards Brisbane	North Coast Line	Rappville towards Maitland
Location

Coombell railway station was a regional railway station on the North Coast line, serving the Northern Rivers locality of Coombell. The station was opened on 6 November 1905. Passenger services ceased on 30 June 1974.
