= Leeville, New South Wales =

Local in Australia

Coordinates: 28°57′S 153°00′E

Leeville is a locality south of the town of Casino in northern New South Wales, Australia. In the 2016 Census, there were 247 people in Leeville.

== Place name ==
Leeville is named after Charles Alfred Lee (1842–1927), M.L.A., Minister for Public Works in New South Wales from 1904–1910.

== Transport ==
The Summerland Way and North Coast railway pass through, and a railway station was provided between 1905 and 1974.

Preceding station	Former services	Following station
Casino towards Brisbane	North Coast Line	Amarina towards Maitland
