= Stroud Road railway station =

Railway station in New South Wales, Australia

Stroud Road

General information
- Location: Stroud, New South Wales
- Coordinates: 32°20′50″S 151°55′48″E
- Line: North Coast
- Distance: 266.500 kilometres from Central
- Platforms: 1
- Tracks: 2

Construction
- Structure type: Ground

Other information
- Status: Closed

History
- Opened: 5 February 1913

Services
| Preceding station | Former services | Following station |
|---|---|---|
| Dewrang towards Brisbane | North Coast Line | Nooroo towards Maitland |
Location

Stroud Road was a railway station on the North Coast railway line in New South Wales, Australia. It was originally opened in 1913 to serve the town of Stroud, which was some distance away, as this was as near as the railway could get at an affordable cost. Stroud Road eventually grew into a small town in its own right.
