= Whiporie, New South Wales =

Town in New South Wales, Australia

Whiporie
- Suburb
- Coordinates: 29°17′S 152°59′E
- Country: Australia
- State: New South Wales
- LGA: Richmond Valley

Government
  - State electorate: Clarence
  - Federal division: Page

Population
  - Total: 114 (2021 census)
- Postcode: 2469

Whiporie is a locality between the towns of Casino and Grafton on the Summerland Way in northern New South Wales, Australia. According to the 2021 census, Whiporie has a population of 114 people.

The North Coast railway passes nearby, and a railway station was open between 1906 and 1974.

Preceding station	Former services	Following station
Camira Creek towards Brisbane	North Coast Line	Banyabba towards Maitland
