= Kyogle railway station =

Railway station in New South Wales, Australia

Kyogle
- The first train to Brisbane in October 1930

General information
- Location: Anzac Drive, Kyogle
- Coordinates: 28°37′13″S 153°00′05″E
- Owner: Transport Asset Manager of New South Wales
- Operator: NSW TrainLink
- Line: North Coast
- Distance: 833.80 kilometres (518.10 mi) from Central
- Platforms: 1
- Tracks: 1

Construction
- Structure type: Ground
- Accessible: Yes

Other information
- Station code: KYO

History
- Opened: 25 June 1910

Services
| Preceding station | NSW TrainLink | Following station |
|---|---|---|
| Brisbane Terminus | NSW TrainLink North Coast Line | Casino towards Sydney |
Location

Kyogle railway station is located on the North Coast line in New South Wales, Australia. Opened on 25 June 1910, it serves the town of Kyogle. It served as the terminus of the line until it was extended to South Brisbane in September 1930.

The weatherboard building with corrugated iron roof has a distinctly Australian architectural style.

== Platforms and services ==
Kyogle has one platform. Each day the station is served by a northbound XPT service to Brisbane and a southbound service to Sydney. This station is a request stop, so the train stops only if passengers booked to board/alight here.

| Platform | Line | Stopping pattern | Notes |
| 1 | North Coast Region | services to Sydney Central & Brisbane | request stop (booked passengers only) |
