= Convincing ground =

Australian name for a place where sports were contested, used in place names

A convincing ground was the name or journalistic euphemism for a place where sports were contested, having limited currency in the nineteenth century, predominantly in Australia and New Zealand.

It has been used to describe a boxing arena in Australia, a social sports ground in 1891, a cricket ground in New Zealand in 1862, and a trotting track in New Zealand in 1904.

Two placenames in Australia retain the name: Convincing Ground Road at Karangi, New South Wales, and the Convincing Ground, a flat coastal area at Allestree near Portland, Victoria where a massacre of Aboriginal Gunditjmara people by whalers is thought to have occurred in 1833 or 1834.
