= Convincing Ground massacre =

Massacre in Victoria, Australia

Date	1833 or 1834
Location	Portland, Victoria, Australia 38.2784°S 141.6595°E

Belligerents
European whalers	Indigenous Gunditjmara: Kilcarer gundidj clan

Casualties and losses
Unknown	60–200; all but 2 young men killed, exact number unknown

The Convincing Ground Massacre was a massacre of the Kilcarer gundidj clan of the Indigenous Gunditjmara people, by British whalers based at Portland Bay in south-eastern Australia. The massacre was part of the wider Eumeralla Wars between the British colonisers and Gunditjmara.

The massacre has been recognised by academics and state officials as a significant event in the history of Victoria. Professor Lynette Russell, from Australian Indigenous Studies at Monash University, says that the "Convincing Ground is probably the first recorded massacre site for Victoria." The Convincing Ground site, on the shore of Portland Bay, close to the town of Portland, has been listed on the Victorian Heritage Register.

== Causes ==
Europeans settled the continent now known as Australia by force, on the false legal premise of terra nullius. Tensions between European settlers and the Gunditjmara had been building since the establishment of Portland as a whaling station was imposed on the local Indigenous people, who had lived there for thousand of generations, some five years previously. However, around 1833 or 1834, a dispute over a beached whale caused events to escalate. While reports vary as to the number of casualties, it is clear that Gunditjmara people were determined to assert their right to the whale as traditional food and, when challenged by the whalers, became aggressive.

== Massacre ==
In a conversation in 1841 with George Augustus Robinson, the Protector of Aborigines, Edward Henty and Police Magistrate James Blair said the whalers initially withdrew to the whaling station, only to return with firearms. Robinson's journal entry states: "And the whalers then let fly, to use his expression, right and left upon the natives. He said the natives did not go away but got behind trees and threw spears and stones. They, however, did not much molest them after that." No mention was made in the conversation of any casualties. Later reports, arising from a meeting that Robinson had in 1842 with Gunditjmara people, stated that only two members survived the massacre.

The uncertainty over the date of the massacre and the number of casualties appears to stem from the fact that the incident was reported and documented several years after it occurred. The earliest documented mention of the locality of the Convincing Ground is in an entry of Edward Henty's diary, dated 18 October 1835.

George Augustus Robinson visited the site of the massacre in 1841. He spoke to local squatters and made the following official report (although he made more extensive notes in his personal journal):

Among the remarkable places on the coast, is the "Convincing Ground", originating in a severe conflict which took place in a few years previous between the Aborigines and the Whalers on which occasion a large number of the former were slain. The circumstances are that a whale had come on shore and the Natives who fed on the carcass claimed it was their own. The whalers said they would "convince them" and had recourse to firearms. On this spot a fishery is now established.

On 23 March 1842, at Campbell's station on the Merri River, Aboriginal people briefed Robinson about the massacre. Only 30 men and women from various clans of the Gunditjmara people met him and told him that all but two men of the Kilcarer gundidj clan were slain in the massacre. The two survivors were called Pollikeunnuc and Yarereryarerer and were adopted by the Cart Gundidj clan of Mount Clay. The Cart Gundidj would not allow any member of the clan to go near the settlement of Portland following the massacre. In May 1842, Cart Gundidj resistance leader Partpoaermin was captured at the Convincing Ground after a violent struggle.

Historian Richard Broome has estimated that about 60 Indigenous people were killed during the Convincing Ground massacre. Bruce Pascoe, in his 2007 book Convincing Ground – Learning to Fall in love with your country, says: "The Gundidjmara were beaten in that battle but never convinced of its legitimacy".

=== Origin of 'Convincing Ground' ===
There has been debate over the origin of the term Convincing Ground, with three different European-derived accounts:

- Edward Henty and Police Magistrate Jim Blair said there was a violent altercation to "convince" the Aborigines of European "rights" to land and resources, which led Robinson to write that a large number of people were slain;
- It has been claimed that the name arose because it was a place where whalers settled disputes between themselves.
- Another explanation, which was stated online by the Portland Rotary Club in 2008, is that the site was named by explorer Thomas Mitchell when he visited in August 1836. According to that account: "Surveyor and explorer Thomas Mitchell visited Portland Bay during his search for good pasturage south of the Murray River in August 1836. He was amazed to find the settlement in existence. Indeed when an Aboriginal guide asserted that he could see houses and a ship at anchor Mitchell was disbelieving. However, when a boot print and broken bottle were found in the sand, and cattle tracks nearby, he was convinced and so named the beach area the 'Convincing Ground', by which name it is still known today." The Rotary Club website no longer promulgates that explanation.

It has been noted that Henty's diary entry in October 1835, referring to the Convincing Ground by name, precedes the visit by Mitchell, and so invalidates the latter account. Historian Professor Ian Clark has stated that the source of the name is not the 1835 Henty diary entry, and that the account by Henty and Blair, as told to Robinson, is the explanation for the name.

A fourth account – the oral tradition and reports by the Gunditjmara people – was that a massacre took place. almost wiping out an entire clan. to "convince them" of the European right to their land."

Professor Clark told Message Stick documentary in 2007:

If we deny the history that goes with the Convincing Ground – and that is both the very good documentary evidence that we have, plus the very good oral history that we have from the Gunditjmara people, we are denying Aboriginal people their history, and if we deny Aboriginal people their history, we are denying a major part of the history of Australia.

=== Historical skepticism ===
In a 2007 newspaper article about the Federal Court decision granting Gunditjmara people native title to land, including the Convincing Ground site, Stuart Rintoul wrote that historians Keith Windschuttle and Michael Connor dispute that a massacre took place and allege that the story of the massacre is "myth-making" and "very dubious". In reply, Ian Clark argued that the query about the validity of the massacre story was based on an inaccurate reading of the history.

== 2005–2007 controversy ==
In 2005, a developer was granted the right to build homes on the site. That led to a dispute between the local Glenelg Shire Council and the Koorie community about whether the location should be protected.

Kilcarer clan traditional owner Walter Saunders, a descendant of one of the two massacre survivors, explained the cultural importance of the site on ABC Local Radio:

It stands on the same level as the Eureka Stockade and Gallipoli from our perspective. It is the first recorded massacre in the state. This is where Aboriginal people and non-Aboriginal people fought over the resources of this great country and they happened to kill a large number of my relatives and my mother's relatives.

As a result of a confidential agreement in 2007, some development could occur but the "Convincing Ground" would become a public reservation.

== See also ==
- List of massacres of Indigenous Australians
- Convincing Ground
- Eumeralla Wars
