= Camira Creek railway station =

Former railway station in New South Wales, Australia

Camira Creek

General information
- Location: Camira Creek Road, Whiporie, New South Wales; Australia
- Coordinates: 29.2506°S 152.9654°E
- Operator: Public Transport Commission
- Line: North Coast
- Distance: 756.504 km (470.070 mi) from Central
- Platforms: 1 (1 side)
- Tracks: 3

Construction
- Structure type: Ground

Other information
- Status: Demolished

History
- Opened: 6 November 1905
- Closed: 30 June 1974

Services
Preceding station	Former services	Following station
Ampdale towards Brisbane	North Coast Line	Whiporie towards Maitland
Location

Camira Creek railway station was a regional railway station on the North Coast railway line, serving Camira Creek within the locality of Whiporie in the Northern Rivers region of New South Wales, Australia. The station was opened in 1935 and closed to passenger services in 1974. No remains of the station are extant. Work to ease tight curves in the rail alignment commenced just north of the locality in 2011.
