= Taree railway station =

Australian railway station

Taree
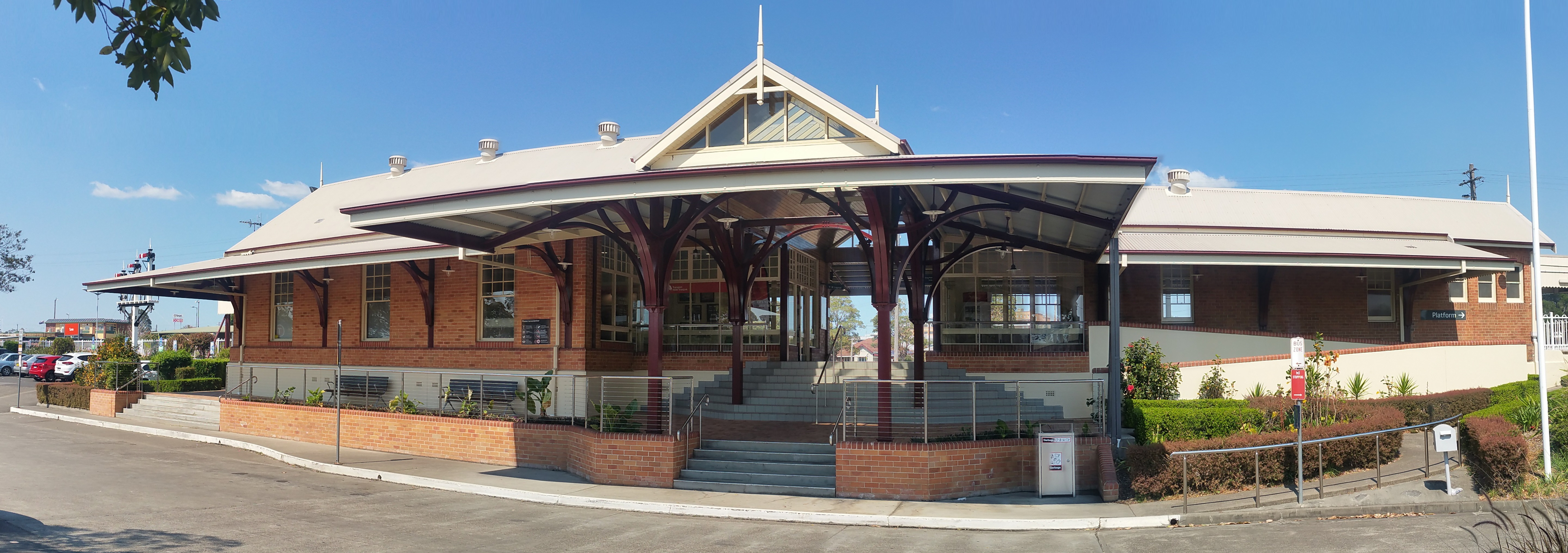
- Station building and entrance, September 2017

General information
- Location: Olympia Street, Taree
- Coordinates: 31°54′23″S 152°27′25″E
- System: Side platform
- Owner: Transport Asset Manager of New South Wales
- Operator: NSW TrainLink
- Line: North Coast
- Distance: 378.60 km (235.25 mi) from Central
- Platforms: 1

Construction
- Structure type: Ground
- Accessible: Yes

Other information
- Station code: TRO
- Website: Transport for NSW

History
- Opened: 5 February 1913; 113 years ago

Services
Preceding station	NSW TrainLink	Following station
Kendall towards Grafton, Casino or Brisbane	NSW TrainLink North Coast Line	Wingham towards Sydney
Location

Taree railway station is a station on the North Coast railway line, New South Wales, Australia. It serves the town of Taree, opening on 5 February 1913 when the line was extended from Dungog. It was a terminus until the line was extended to Wauchope on 12 April 1915. It had extensive locomotive servicing facilities, including an eight-road roundhouse. It was added to the New South Wales State Heritage Register on 2 April 1999.

== Platforms and services ==
Taree has one platform with a yard opposite. Daily northbound XPT services operate to Casino and Brisbane, with two southbound services operating to Sydney. It is also served by daily coach services to Broadmeadow. These coach services are operated by Busways as routes 150 and 151.

Platform	Line	Stopping pattern	Notes
1	North Coast Region	services to Sydney Central, Casino & Brisbane	

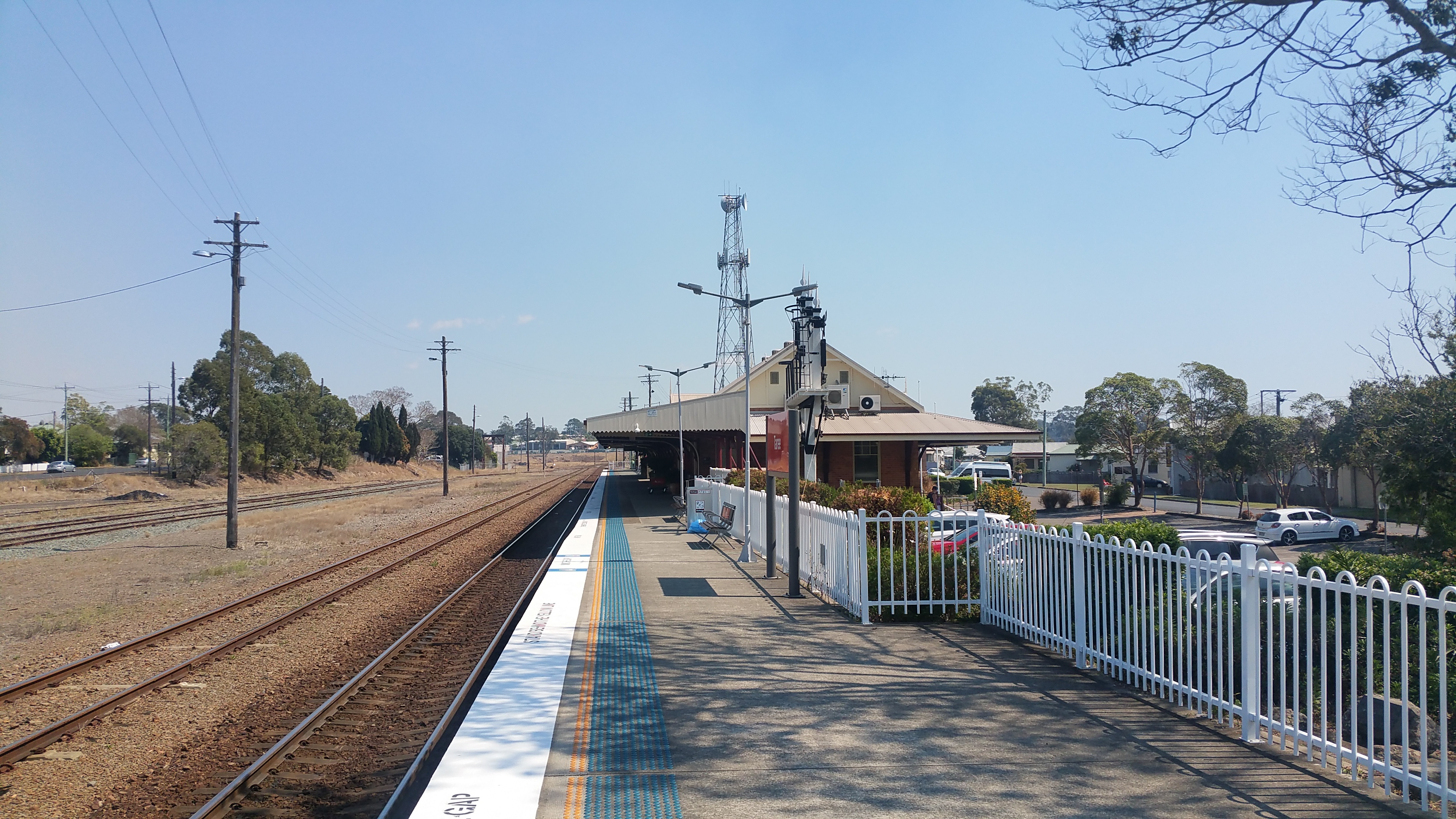
Northbound view on platform

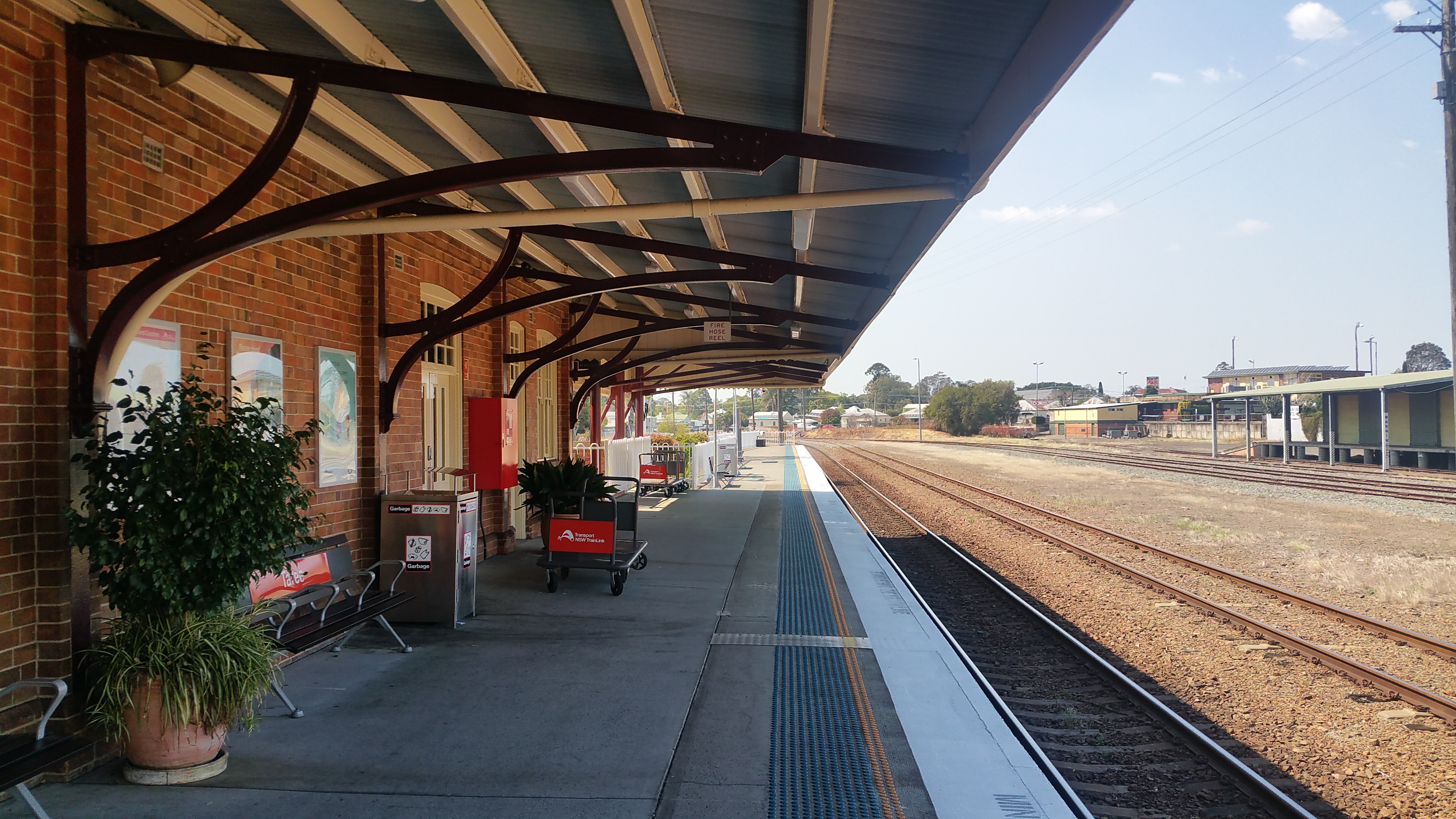
Southbound view on platform

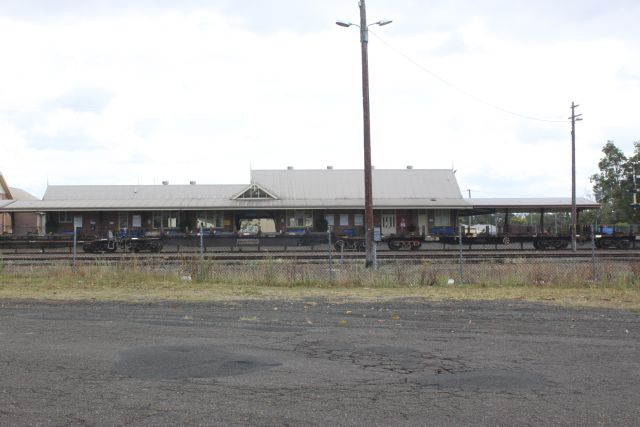
Platform seen from exterior

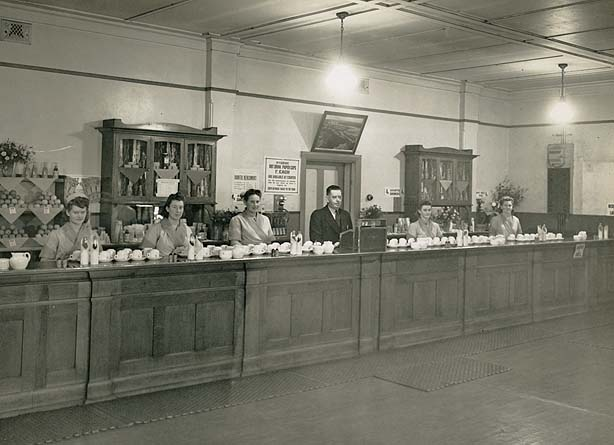
Refreshment room in 1947

== Description ==
The main station building is a brick, type 11 initial side building design completed in 1913, with a refreshment room added in 1929. A weighbridge and goods shed also form part of the station complex.

== Heritage listing ==
Taree is a major station complex from late in the development of the railway system and includes a refreshment room and awnings. The scale of the building is significant and represents the importance of the location in the development of the North Coast line.

Taree railway station was listed on the New South Wales State Heritage Register on 2 April 1999 having satisfied the following criteria.

The place possesses uncommon, rare or endangered aspects of the cultural or natural history of New South Wales.

This item is assessed as historically rare. This item is assessed as architecturally rare. This item is assessed as socially rare.
