= Old Grafton railway station =

Former railway station in New South Wales, Australia

Grafton

General information
- Location: Grafton
- Coordinates: 29.683765°S 152.924602°E
- Platforms: 1 side

History
- Opened: 6 November 1905
- Closed: 1 October 1976

Services
Preceding station	Former services	Following station
Warragai Creek towards Brisbane	North Coast Line	Grafton towards Maitland
Location

Grafton railway station was a station on the North Coast Line or, Sydney-Brisbane railway in northern New South Wales, Australia. It was 699 km (434 mi) from Central Station, Sydney and served the city of Grafton. It was opened on 6 November 1905 as the southern terminus of the original North Coast railway line. It was closed on 1 October 1976 when South Grafton became the city's main railway station. Since 2005 the station in South Grafton is again known as Grafton Station

Although closed to passengers as the original station house burned down, the site remains in use as a goods yard.
