= Casino railway station =

Australian railway station

Casino
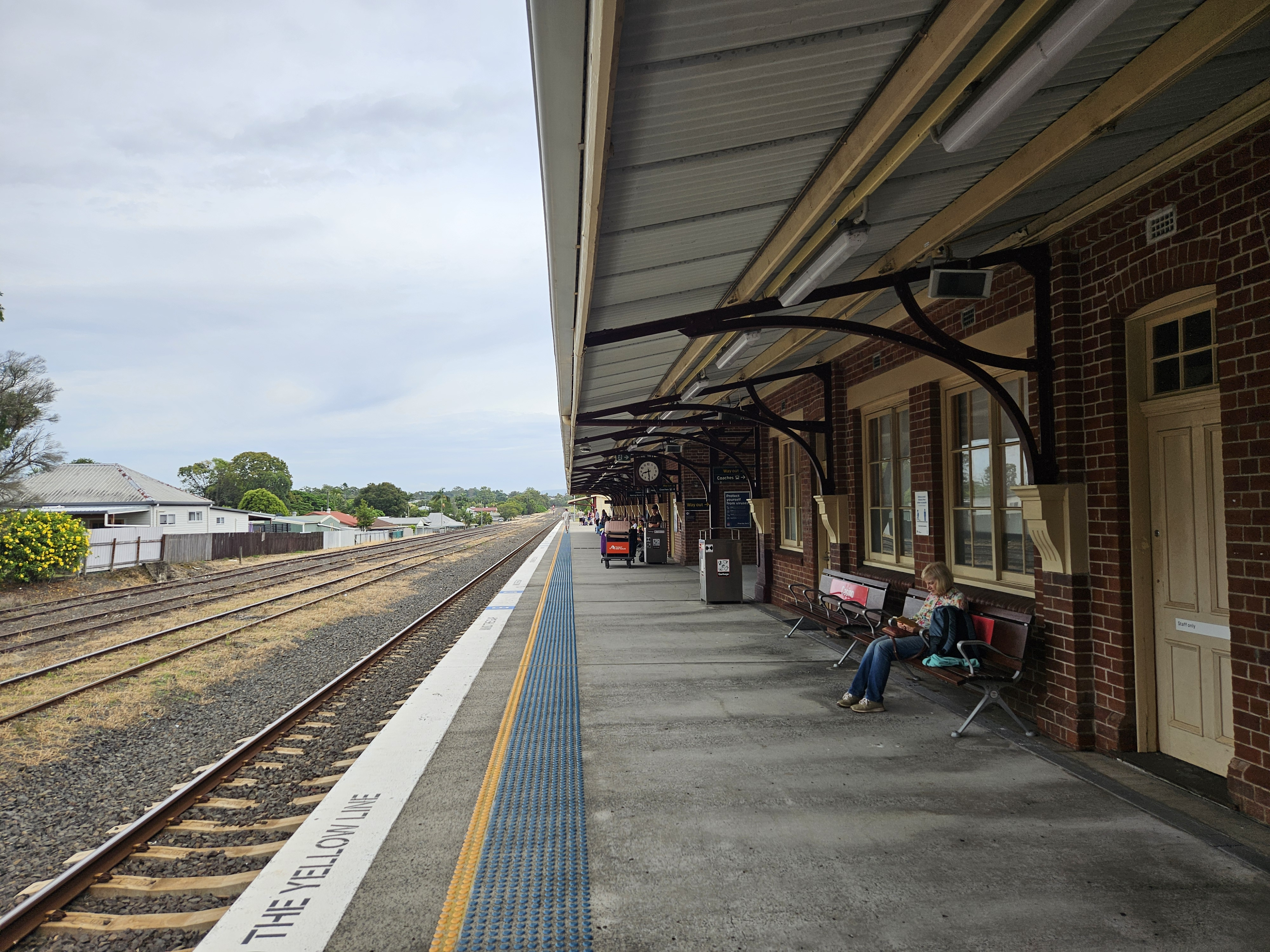
- Casino railway station platform looking north

General information
- Location: Canterbury Street, Casino
- Coordinates: 28°51′40″S 153°02′18″E
- Owner: Transport Asset Manager of New South Wales
- Operator: NSW TrainLink
- Line: North Coast
- Distance: 805.07 km (500.25 mi) from Central
- Platforms: 1 (1 side)
- Tracks: 4

Construction
- Structure type: Ground
- Accessible: Yes

Other information
- Status: Weekdays: Staffed: 1.30am to 9.30am, 12.15am to 8.15pm: Weekends and public holidays: Unstaffed
- Station code: CSI

History
- Opened: 22 September 1930; 95 years ago

Passengers
- 128,234

Services
| Preceding station | NSW TrainLink | Following station |
|---|---|---|
| Kyogle towards Brisbane | NSW TrainLink North Coast Line Brisbane XPT | Grafton towards Sydney |
| Terminus | NSW TrainLink North Coast Line Casino XPT | Grafton towards Sydney |
Former services
| Preceding station | Former services | Following station |
|---|---|---|
| Nammoona towards Brisbane | North Coast Line | Leeville towards Maitland |
| Terminus | Murwillumbah Line | Old Casino towards Murwillumbah |
Location

Casino railway station is a heritage-listed railway station on the North Coast line in New South Wales, Australia. Opening on 22 September 1930, it serves the town of Casino. It was added to the New South Wales State Heritage Register on 2 April 1999.

== History ==
The original Casino railway station (now named Old Casino railway station) opened on 19 October 1903 when the Murwillumbah line was extended from Lismore, ultimately reaching Grafton in 1905. However, when the North Coast line was extended from Kyogle to the Queensland border, it would not pass through the Old Casino railway station, as that segment of the line would become a branch line to the new mainline. So it was necessary to build a new mainline station to serve Casino. The new Casino railway station opened on 22 September 1930.

The station originally was an island platform. In October 1990, the eastern platform was decommissioned, later being filled in and redeveloped as a coach stop. The Murwillumbah line branches off immediately North of the station, although it has not been used since 2004, the track is still in place and a short distance at Casino is used for occasional shunting movements.

Casino had a locomotive depot with a roundhouse until it closed on 25 July 1986. It reopened in 1996 when it was leased to Northern Rivers Railroad.

== Platforms and services ==
Casino has one platform with a passing loop. Each day the station is served by a northbound XPT service to Brisbane and a southbound service to Sydney. In addition a daily XPT to/from Sydney terminates at Casino.

NSW TrainLink also operate coach services from the station to Tweed Heads, Robina, Surfers Paradise and Brisbane.

| Platform | Line | Stopping pattern | Notes |
| 1 | North Coast Region | services to Sydney Central & Brisbane | |

== Description ==
The heritage-listed complex includes a type 13 brick station building with brick platform (completed in 1930), brick refreshment rooms (completed 1930) and a standard 1915 design roundhouse (completed 1933). Structures at the station include the water column in locomotive depot yard, steel water tank with column attached, 75' turntable (completed 1933) and timber and steel 'Harmon' coal stage (completed 1956). A fibro elevated signal box (1946) was demolished in 2012.

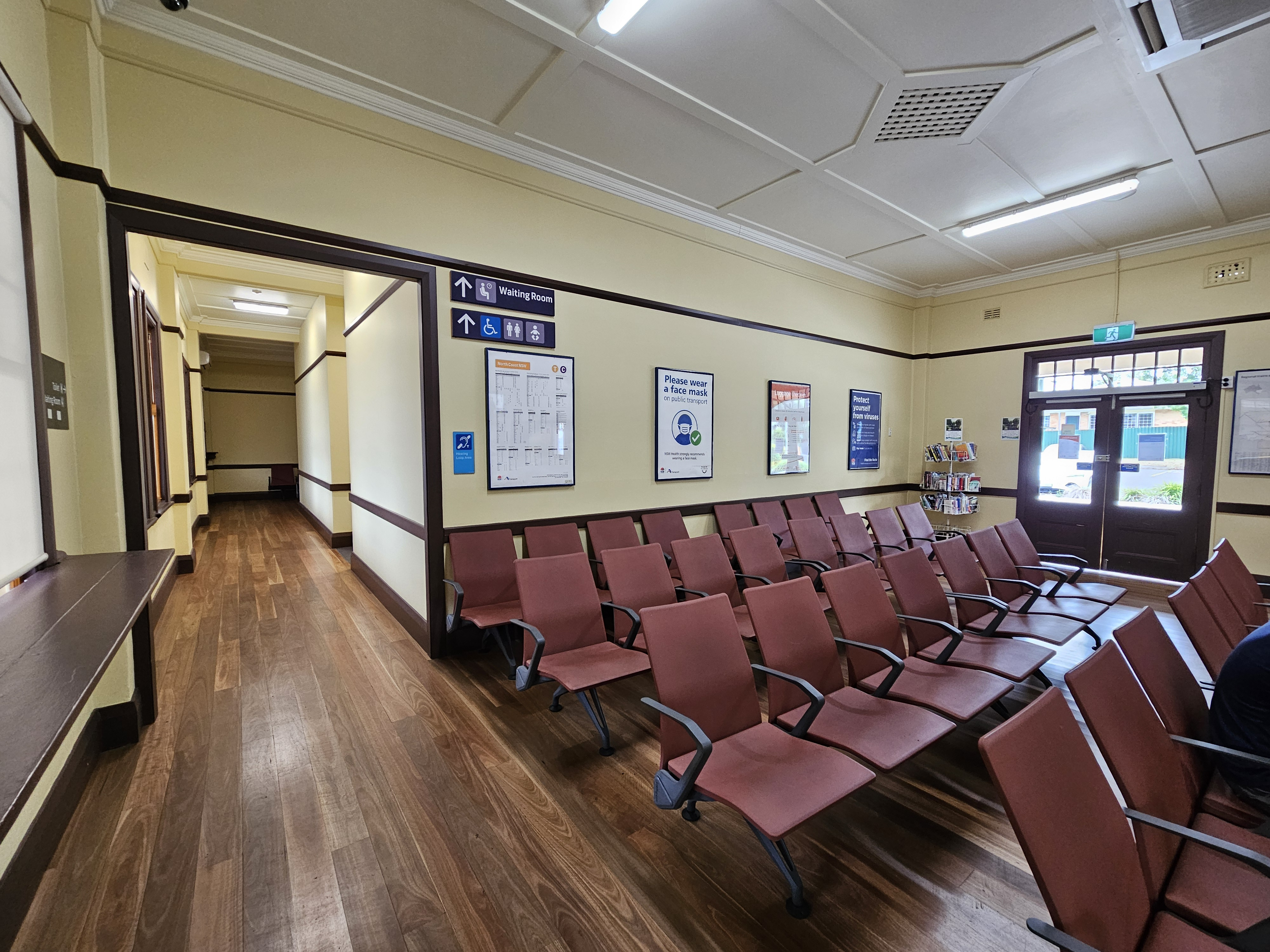
Casino (NSW) railway station waiting room

== Heritage listing ==
Casino station group is an imposing and significant group of buildings in a major country location. The station building is one of the largest standard buildings and with the adjacent refreshment rooms constructed at the same time form the best surviving later period station groups in the state. The locomotive facilities are of high significance, particularly the timber coal loader, which is the last of several of these unique structures on the rail system.

Casino railway station was listed on the New South Wales State Heritage Register on 2 April 1999 having satisfied the following criteria.

The place possesses uncommon, rare or endangered aspects of the cultural or natural history of New South Wales.

This item is assessed as historically rare. This item is assessed as scientifically rare. This item is assessed as architecturally rare. This item is assessed as socially rare.
