= Grafton railway station, New South Wales =

Australian railway station

Grafton
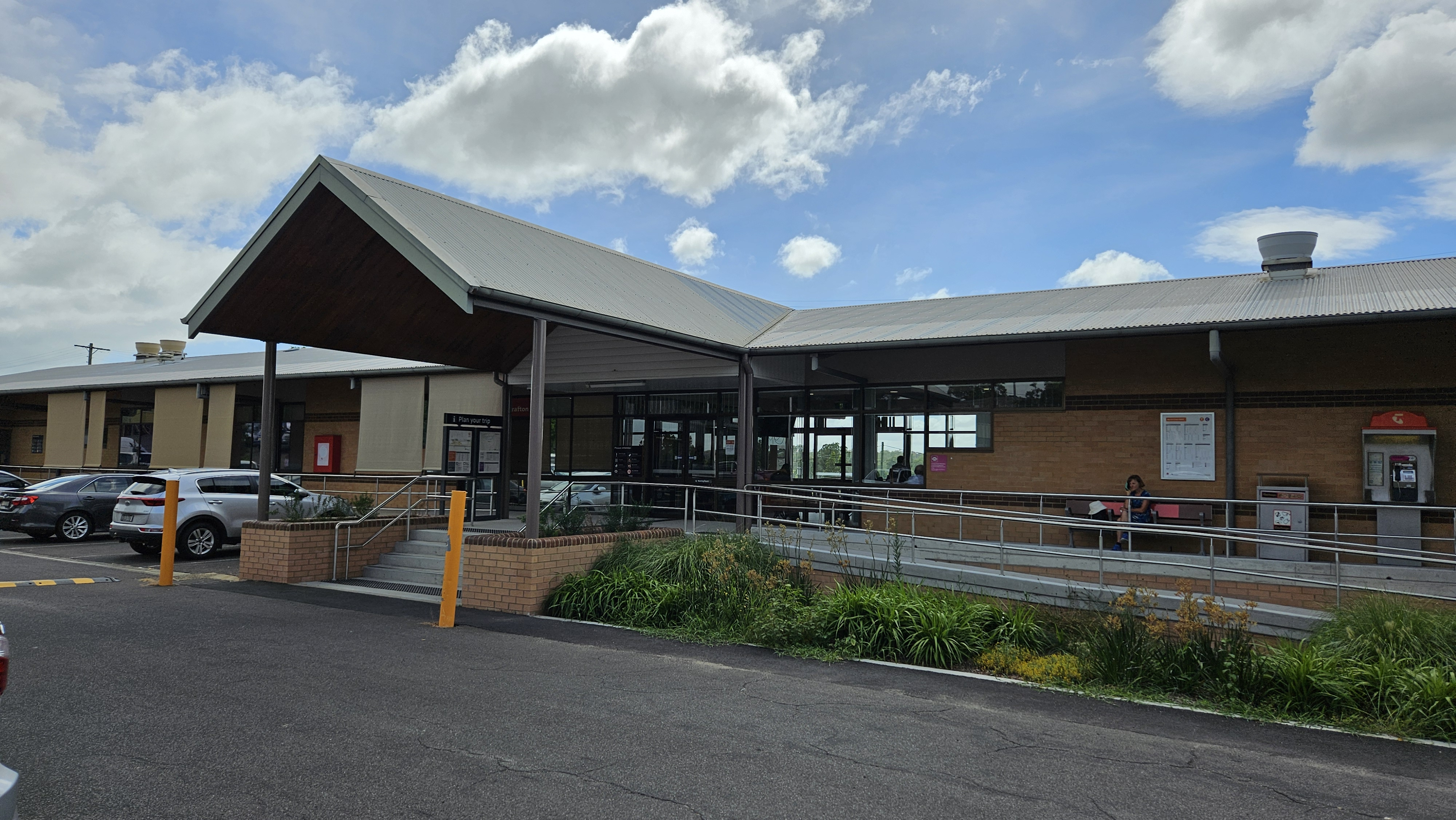
- Grafton railway station building and forecourt, January 2024

General information
- Location: Through Street, South Grafton
- Coordinates: 29°42′13″S 152°56′30″E
- Elevation: 6 metres (20 ft)
- Owner: Transport Asset Manager of New South Wales
- Operator: NSW TrainLink
- Line: North Coast
- Distance: 695.70 km (432.29 mi) from Central
- Platforms: 1
- Tracks: 3

Construction
- Structure type: Ground
- Accessible: Yes

Other information
- Status: Weekdays: Staffed: 4am to 9pm, 9.30pm to 1.30am: Weekends and public holidays: Unstaffed
- Station code: GFN

History
- Opened: 12 October 1915; 110 years ago
- Rebuilt: 26 November 1993
- Former names: South Grafton (1915–1976); Grafton City (1976–2005)

Services
Preceding station	NSW TrainLink	Following station
Casino towards Casino or Brisbane	NSW TrainLink North Coast Line Casino & Brisbane XPT	Coffs Harbour towards Sydney
Location

Grafton railway station is a railway station on the North Coast line in South Grafton, New South Wales, Australia. It serves the city of Grafton, opening on 12 October 1915 as South Grafton when the line opened from Glenreagh. It was renamed Grafton City on 1 October 1976 when the original Grafton station north of the Clarence River closed. Since 2005, it has been known as Grafton.

The original building was replaced by a new building opened on 26 November 1993 by Division of Page member Ian Causley. Some of the older buildings on the site are listed on the New South Wales State Heritage Register.

== Platforms and services ==
Grafton has one platform. Each day northbound XPT services operate to Casino and Brisbane, with two southbound services operating to Sydney.

NSW TrainLink also operates coach services from the station to Byron Bay and Moree.

To the north of the station lies the Sunshine Sugar factory.

Platform	Line	Stopping pattern	Notes
1	North Coast Region	services to Sydney Central, Casino & Brisbane	

== Heritage listing ==
Grafton Railway Station Group is of State historic significance as a former major railway administrative centre for the North Coast. The extant refreshment rooms is a unique structure on the NSW rail system built for the movement of troops during World War II and remains as an important reminder of the site's role in the Australian war effort and the role played by rail in moving troops around the country. The extant barracks building is representative of a series of similar barracks buildings constructed throughout the NSW railway system for train crews to rest between shifts. The office block demonstrates the former administrative role of the site. Overall, the significance of the railway precinct has been compromised by modern buildings, the demolition of the extensive locomotive servicing depot and all other original buildings.

The surviving refreshment rooms and railway barracks from the pre-1993 station were listed on the New South Wales State Heritage Register on 2 April 1999. These consist of:

A large covered open dining hall area book-ended by a weatherboard kitchen and storeroom. The kitchen is a simple gable roofed building clad in corrugated iron and featuring timber double-hung windows, small rear porch and a simple verandah supported by timber posts fronting on to the platform. The storeroom is located under the gable roof of the dining hall and clad in weatherboard.

Barracks (c. 1943)

Single-storey brick building constructed as two separate wings with a hipped tiled roof, simple decorative brickwork banding. The barracks features a series of bedroom and bathroom facilities, with a secondary wing featuring a kitchen and dining area.

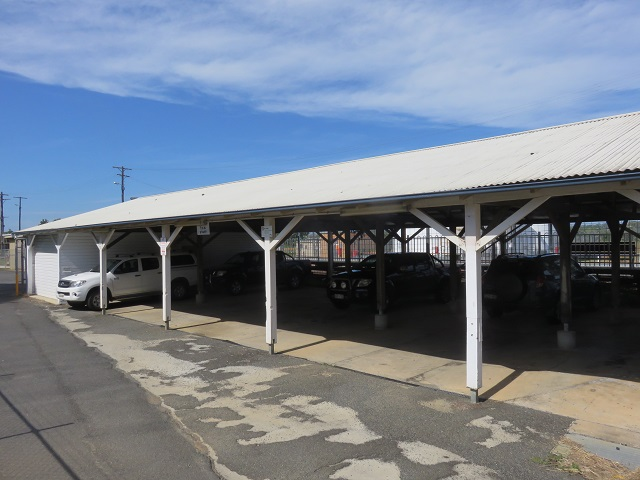
Former refreshment rooms

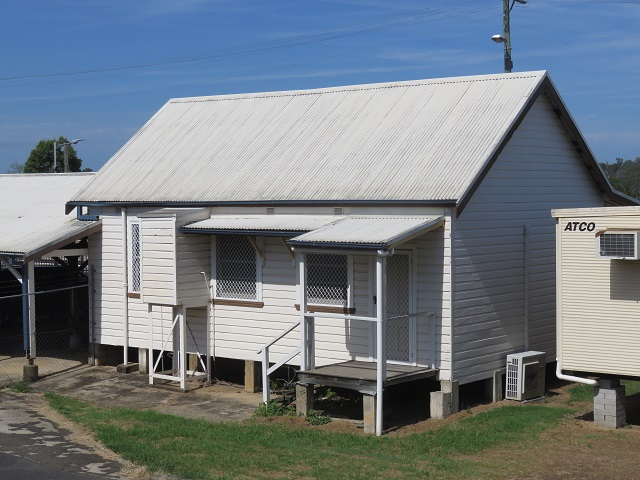
Former railway barracks

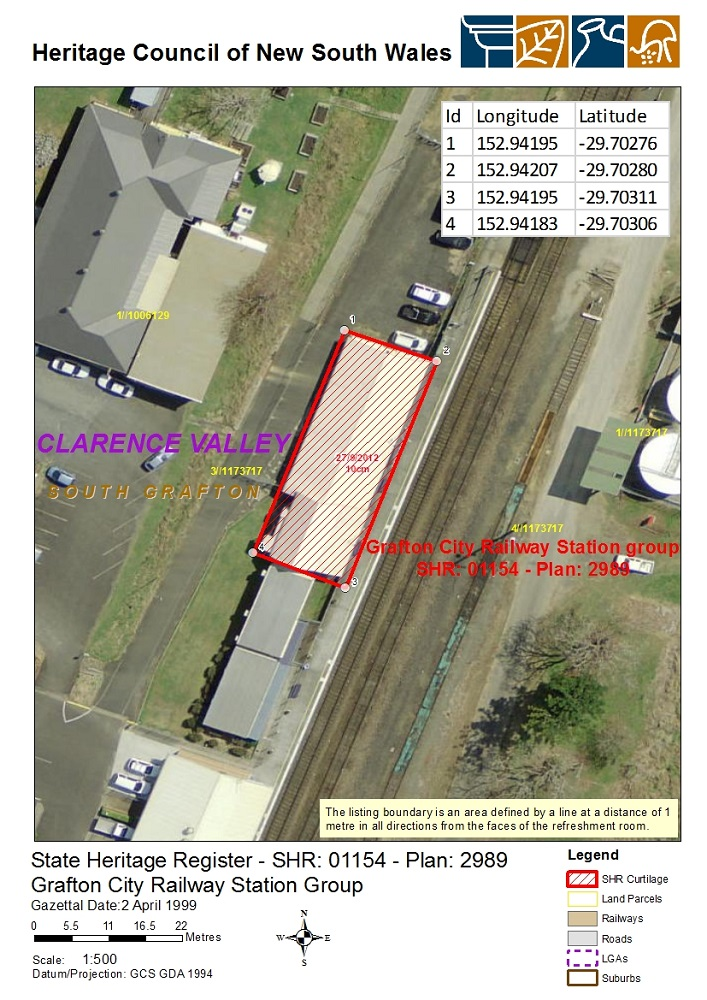
Heritage boundaries Refreshment rooms (c. 1943)
