= North Coast railway line, New South Wales =

Railway line in New South Wales, Australia

North Coast railway line
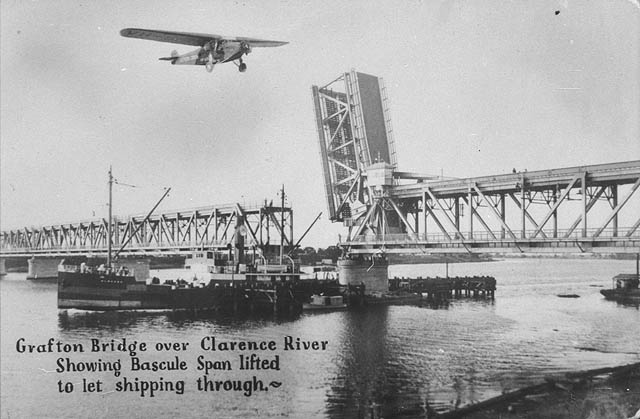
- Grafton Bridge opened over the Clarence River in 1932

Overview
- Status: Open
- Owner: New South Wales Government Railways (1905–1915); Department of Railways (1915–1972); Public Transport Commission (1972–1980); State Rail Authority (1980–2003); RailCorp (2003–2020); Transport Asset Manager of New South Wales (2020–present)
- Locale: Mid North Coast and Northern Rivers regions of New South Wales
- Termini: Maitland; Brisbane Roma Street

Service
- Type: Heavy rail

History
- Opened: 6 November 1905

Technical
- Line length: 795 km (494 mi)
- Track gauge: 1,435 mm (4 ft 8 1/2 in) standard gauge

The North Coast railway line is the primary rail route in the Mid North Coast and Northern Rivers regions of New South Wales, Australia, and forms a major part of the Sydney–Brisbane rail corridor.

The line begins at Maitland and ends at Roma Street railway station in Brisbane, although freight services terminate at the yard at Acacia Ridge on the outskirts of Brisbane. Along the way, the railway passes through the towns of Dungog, Gloucester, Wingham, Taree, Kendall, Wauchope, Kempsey, Macksville, Nambucca Heads, Urunga, Sawtell, Coffs Harbour, Grafton, Casino and Kyogle. After the standard gauge line ends at Acacia Ridge, it forms a dual gauge line into Brisbane, running alongside parts of the Beenleigh railway line.

Since the Main Northern Line was closed north of Armidale in 1988, the North Coast line is now the only route between Sydney and Queensland. With the closure of former branches to Dorrigo (1972) and Murwillumbah (2004) there are no operating branches off the line.

The Bonalbo branch from Casino was stillborn, with partial construction left incomplete.

At the NSW/Queensland border is a long tunnel called Border Tunnel, a single-track extending 1160 metres. Immediately south of it was Border Loop, a short crossing loop, which is now closed. About one kilometre south of that is the Cougal Spiral. These two locations are often confused.

The line is owned by the Transport Asset Manager of New South Wales but leased to the Australian Rail Track Corporation until 2064.

== History ==
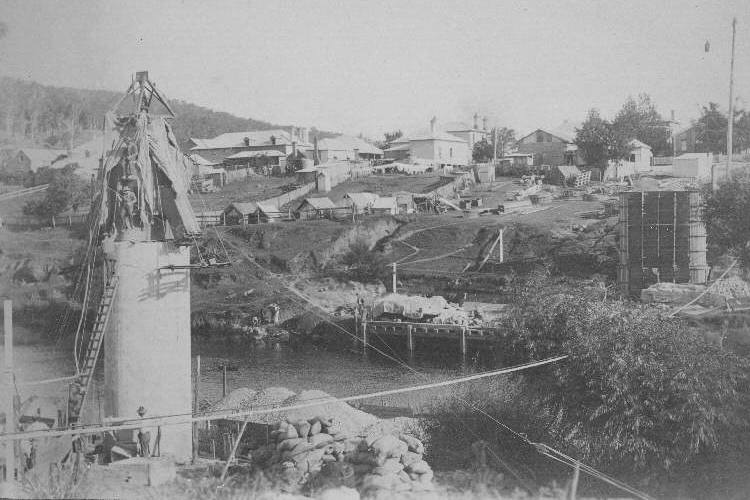
Paterson bridge under construction in 1910

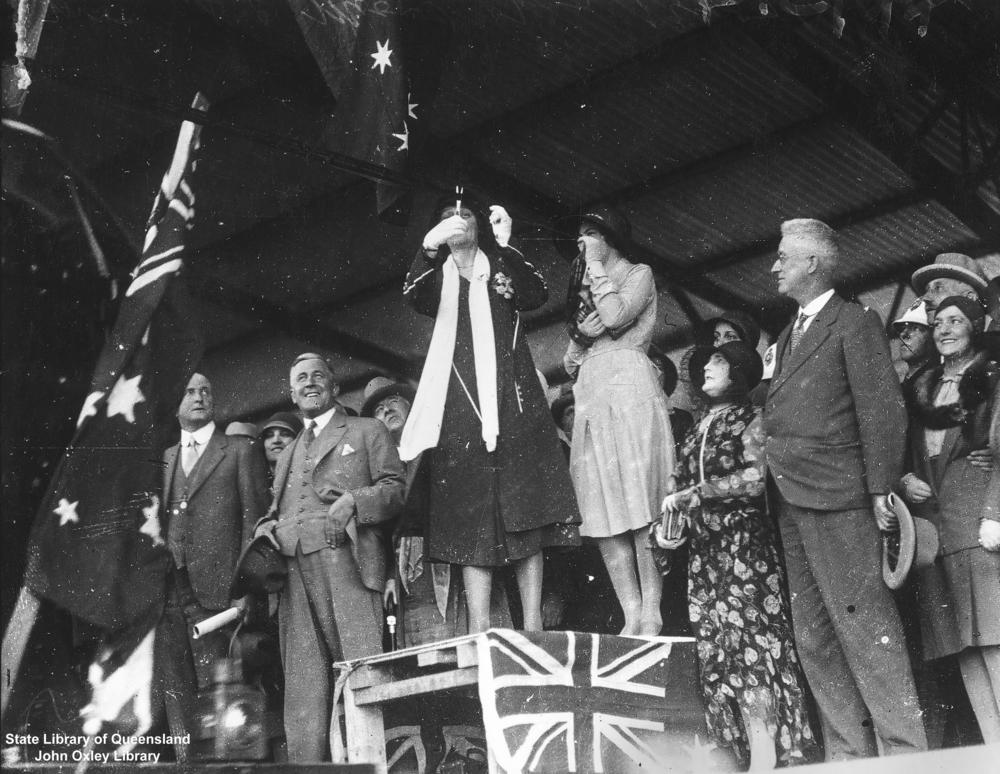
Official opening of the Kyogle Interstate Railway Line by Mrs. A. E. Moore, wife of the Queensland premier, at South Brisbane

The first North Coast railway was opened between Murwillumbah, Byron Bay and Lismore in 1894 and extended to Casino in 1903 and Grafton in 1905. A branch line was built to Kyogle in 1910, it was extended to South Brisbane in 1930.

The line was built between 1905 and 1932, and when completed, bypassed the Main North line and provided a quicker route up the eastern seaboard. The development of the line was hampered by the many large rivers that flow through the North Coast. The line also features the Cougal Spiral, which is one of only two spirals in New South Wales.

A railway was built from Maitland to Paterson and Dungog in 1911. It was extended to Gloucester and Taree in 1913 and to Wauchope, Kempsey and Coffs Harbour and from Glenreagh to South Grafton (now Grafton station) in 1915. The gap between Coffs Harbour and Glenreagh, which contains five tunnels, was completed in 1922.

The Clarence River was the most difficult river to cross and it was not crossed until 1932. In the meantime, services were connected by rail ferry that carried the carriages across the river. The opening of the Grafton Bridge in 1932 completed the Sydney – Brisbane line as the first standard gauge inter-capital link.

The completion of the Sydney–Brisbane link saw the Casino–Murwillumbah line become a branch line. In 1930 a branch line had been added to Ballina but this closed in 1949. The Murwillumbah branch closed in 2004.

A picturesque branch was opened from Glenreagh to Dorrigo in 1924, but was difficult to maintain due to the steep terrain and high rainfall and it was closed in 1972 after a washaway. The Glenreagh to Ulong section is proposed for reopening as a heritage tourist railway by the Glenreagh Mountain Railway. The Dorrigo Steam Railway & Museum is also being set up in Dorrigo as a museum and working exhibit.

== Passenger services ==
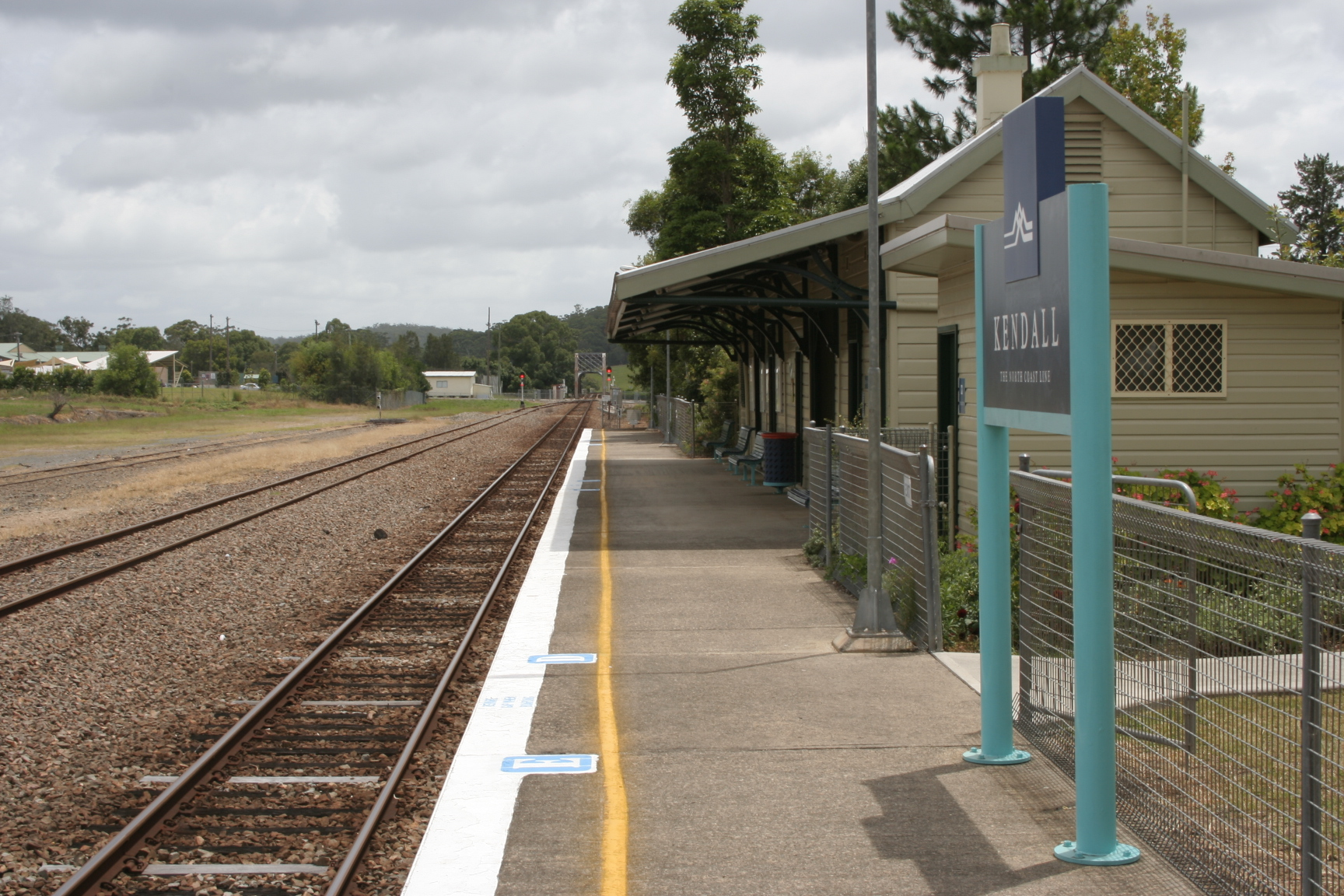
Kendall station in January 2008

=== Current services ===
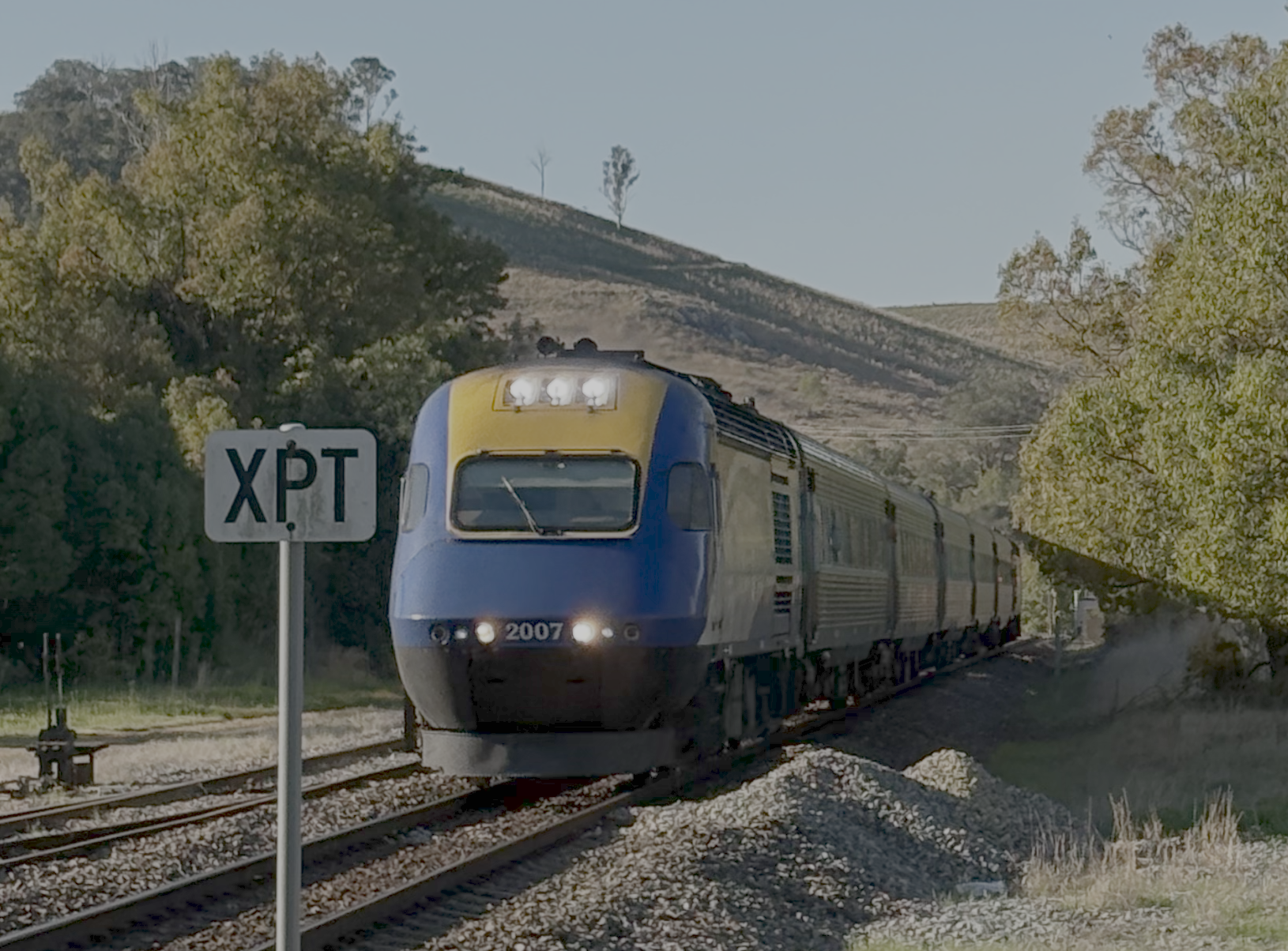
An XPT approaching Gloucester station

NSW TrainLink operates three daily XPT services from Sydney terminating at Grafton, Casino and Brisbane and thirty-one weekly services from Newcastle terminating at Dungog.

=== Historical services ===
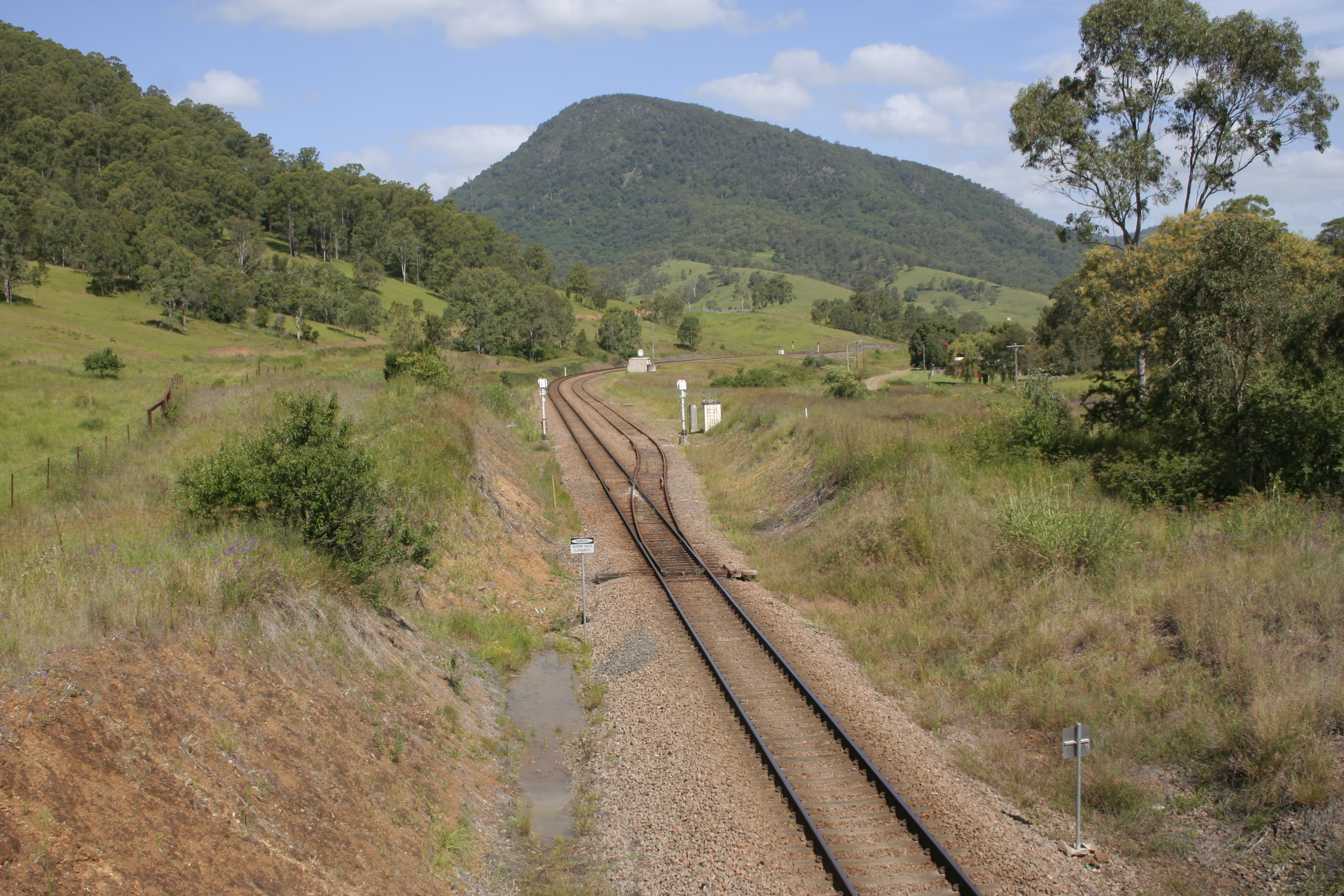
Line at Bundook, near Gloucester

The premier trains on the North Coast line were the two daily services to Brisbane, the Brisbane Limited and the Brisbane Express. The Limited was the fastest service, stopping only at major stations, while the Express operated as a sweeper service stopping at most stations north of Grafton and provided connections to services on the Murwillumbah branch. Air-conditioned Sleeping cars had operated on the Brisbane Limited from 1960. In April 1973 the Brisbane Express was withdrawn and replaced by the Gold Coast Motorail, operating to Murwillumbah. The North Coast Daylight Express and North Coast Mail operated to Grafton until they were both replaced in 1985 by a single Holiday Coast XPT train. Following the Booz Allen Hamilton review of 1989 which recommended severe rationalisation of country rail services, the Brisbane and Murwillumbah services were converted to XPT operation in February 1990, and a locomotive hauled Grafton Express service to Grafton introduced in June 1990. In November 1993 the Grafton Express was also converted to XPT operation.

== Freight services ==
When the Main North Line was closed north of Armidale in 1988, super-freighters to Brisbane began using the North Coast Line, operated by the State Rail Authority, then National Rail. Today, freight services on the North Coast Line are operated by Pacific National, Aurizon, Qube Holdings and SCT Logistics. These super freighters do not serve any of the towns they pass through – in the government railways era, there would be regular freight services to towns such as Kempsey, Grafton and Casino.

The only freight train that regularly services the North Coast Line is a cement and sugar train for Grafton, and is operated by Pacific National.

== Improvement works ==
The North Coast Line has significant curvature, equivalent to turning through 150 circles – 75.5 to the right and 74.5 to the left heading north, the difference of one circle due to the Cougal Spiral in the Border Ranges. Of course the curves are unevenly distributed meaning that maximum speeds change hundreds of times usually within the range of 60 km/h (37 mph) and 115 km/h (71 mph) for freight trains.

The Australian Rail Track Corporation has recently resleepered the track with concrete sleepers, upgraded the signals and installed new loops to increase efficiency. In mid-2011 they eased about 58 sections of curves on the line, increasing line speed for the XPT and freight trains. The curve easing was done without land purchases, so the track changes would be minor, staying within the existing corridor.

== Location list ==
This is a list of all the locations and crossing loops on the North Coast line.

Location	km from Sydney	Signal Prefix
Telarah	194.5	MD
Mindaribba	203.5	02
Paterson	213.2	03
Martins Creek	218.5	04
Kilbride	223.5	05
Hilldale	226.2	
Wallarobba	231.7	
Wallarobba Loop	234.0	06
Wirragulla	238.0	
Dungog	245.2	07
North Dungog	247.2	07
Monkerai	254.0	08
Stroud Road	266.5	09
Duralie	272.8	09
Weismantels	278.1	
South Craven	290.5	11
North Craven	292.5	11
Berrico	301.9	12
Gloucester	309.3	13
Yumbunga (closed)	316.4	14
Bulliac	324.1	15
Bundook	334.4	16
Mount George	342.1	17
Kimbriki (closed)	353.2	18
Killawarra	360.3	19
Wingham	367.1	20
Taree	378.6	21
Melinga	392.3	22
Coopernook	403.6	23
Johns River	417.7	24
Kendall	433.0	25
Kerewong	445.8	26
Wauchope	455.0	27
Telegraph Point	472.5	28
Kundabung	487.2	29
Kempsey	503.5	30
Collombatti		
Tamban	520.6	31
Barraganyatti		
Eungai	534.6	32
Warrell Creek		
Macksville	552.4	
Nambucca Heads	565.1	34
Urunga	580.9	
Raleigh	586.5	35
Bonville	596.5	36
Sawtell	600.7	
Boambee Beach	606.8	37
Coffs Harbour	608.1	37
Landrigans siding (closed)	619.6	38
Coramba	628.0	39
Nana Glen	640.3	40
Glenreagh	651.9	41
Kungala	664.3	42
Braunstone	683.3	43
Grafton	695.7	44
Old Grafton	698.8	45
Koolkhan	706.8	
Kyarran	713.6	46
Lawrence Road	738.7	47
Camira Creek		
Rappville	776.2	50
Leeville (closed)	793.7	51
Casino	805.1	52
Nammoona	810.1	CO
Kyogle	833.8	
Kyogle Loop	837.1	KE
Loadstone	863.5	LE
Border Loop (or Cougal Spiral)	875.1	
NSW/Queensland Border	876.0	
Glenapp	887.6	GP
Tamrookum	909.3	TM
Bromelton	931.7	BN
Greenbank	955.6	GK
Acacia Ridge		AR
Salisbury Junction	975.976	SY
Clapham Loop		CM
Yeerongpilly		YY
Dutton Park Junction		DP
South Brisbane		SB
Roma Street		RS

== See also ==
- Rail transport in New South Wales
