= Arcola =

Arcola may refer to:

== Places ==
Australia

- Arcola, Grafton, a heritage-listed house in New South Wales

Canada

- Arcola, Saskatchewan, a town in the Province of Saskatchewan
- Arcola Airport, an airport in the Province of Saskatchewan

England

- Arcola Theatre, a theatre in the London Borough of Hackney

Italy

- Arcola, Liguria, a comune in the province of La Spezia
- Arcola, Verona, alternate name for Arcole

United States

- Arcola, Alabama, founded by French Bonapartists, now a ghost town, in Hale County
- Arcola, California, an unincorporated community in Madera County
- Arcola, Georgia, an unincorporated community
- Arcola, Illinois, a city in Douglas County
- Arcola, Indiana, an unincorporated community in Allen County
- Arcola, Louisiana, an inhabited place in Tangipahoa Parish
- Arcola, Minnesota, an unincorporated community in Washington County
- Arcola, Mississippi, a town in Washington County
- Arcola, Missouri, a village in Dade County
- Arcola, New Jersey, an unincorporated community in Bergen County
- Arcola, Pennsylvania, an unincorporated community in Montgomery County
- Arcola, Texas, a city in Fort Bend County
- Arcola, Virginia, an unincorporated community in Loudoun County
- Arcola, West Virginia, an unincorporated community
- Arcola Carnegie Public Library, a library in Douglas County, Illinois
- Arcola Township, Douglas County, Illinois, a township in Douglas County

== Other ==
- Arcola (record label), an English record label
- Arcola (moth), a snout moth genus of subfamily Phycitinae
- Battle of Arcola, 1796 battle at the Bridge of Arcole (Verona, Italy)
- Arcola, The Battle for Italy 1796, a 1979 board wargame that simulates the Battle of Arcola
- Chachi Arcola, a character in the American television series Happy Days
