= Mitchell Notaras =

Australian-born surgeon and philanthropist

- Born: 26 March 1933; Grafton, New South Wales
- Died: 30 July 2011; Kythera, Greece
- Education: Newington College; University of Sydney
- Occupation: Surgeon
- Spouse(s): 1962 Dr Lorna McPhail (divorced); 1981 Bente Fasmer
- Children: 2 sons 3 daughters
- Parent(s): Anthony Notaras and Ianthe, née Megalaconomos

Mitchell James Notaras (26 March 1933 – 30 July 2011) was an Australian-born surgeon and philanthropist.

== Biography ==
Notaras and his twin brother Angelo were born at Grafton, New South Wales, two of five children of Kytherian-Greek immigrants, Anthony and Ianthe Notaras. He attended Grafton primary and high schools before boarding at Newington College (1948–1950). Notaras was awarded a Commonwealth Government Scholarship and went up to the University of Sydney, where he graduated as a Bachelor of Medicine and Surgery in 1957.

=== Medical career ===
He did his clinical undergraduate studies at Royal Prince Alfred Hospital, then returned to the hospital as a junior, then senior, medical officer. To gain experience abroad, he travelled to England as a ship's surgeon on a cargo vessel and took work in London. Notaras continued his studies while working at Hammersmith Hospital. He obtained fellowships of the Royal College of Surgeons of Edinburgh and the Royal College of Surgeons of England. He was also a senior registrar and Medical Research Council fellow at St Mark's Hospital for Colorectal Diseases in London, and a senior registrar in surgery at University College Hospital in London. He was also a Fellow of the American College of Surgeons and he held a number of consultant posts, including senior lecturer and honorary consultant surgeon at University College Hospital in London and was a consultant surgeon to the Italian Hospital London, St Luke's Hospital for the Clergy, and Barnet and Edgware general hospitals. He was a recognised teacher in surgery at the University of London, and visited and lectured in 28 countries. Notaras's special interest was in colorectal surgery, mesh repair of hernias, and rectal prolapse. He introduced lateral subcutaneous internal anal sphincterotomy for anal fissure, now an established procedure.

=== Business career ===
In Britain, Notaras was instrumental in establishing a company, Abgene, which manufactured molecular biological reagents, plastic consumables and instrumentation for life sciences. It also became involved in research, both in-house and through collaborations with universities and industrial partners, particularly in gene and DNA technology. Abgene was later bought by Apogent Corporation in the United States of America.

== Later life ==
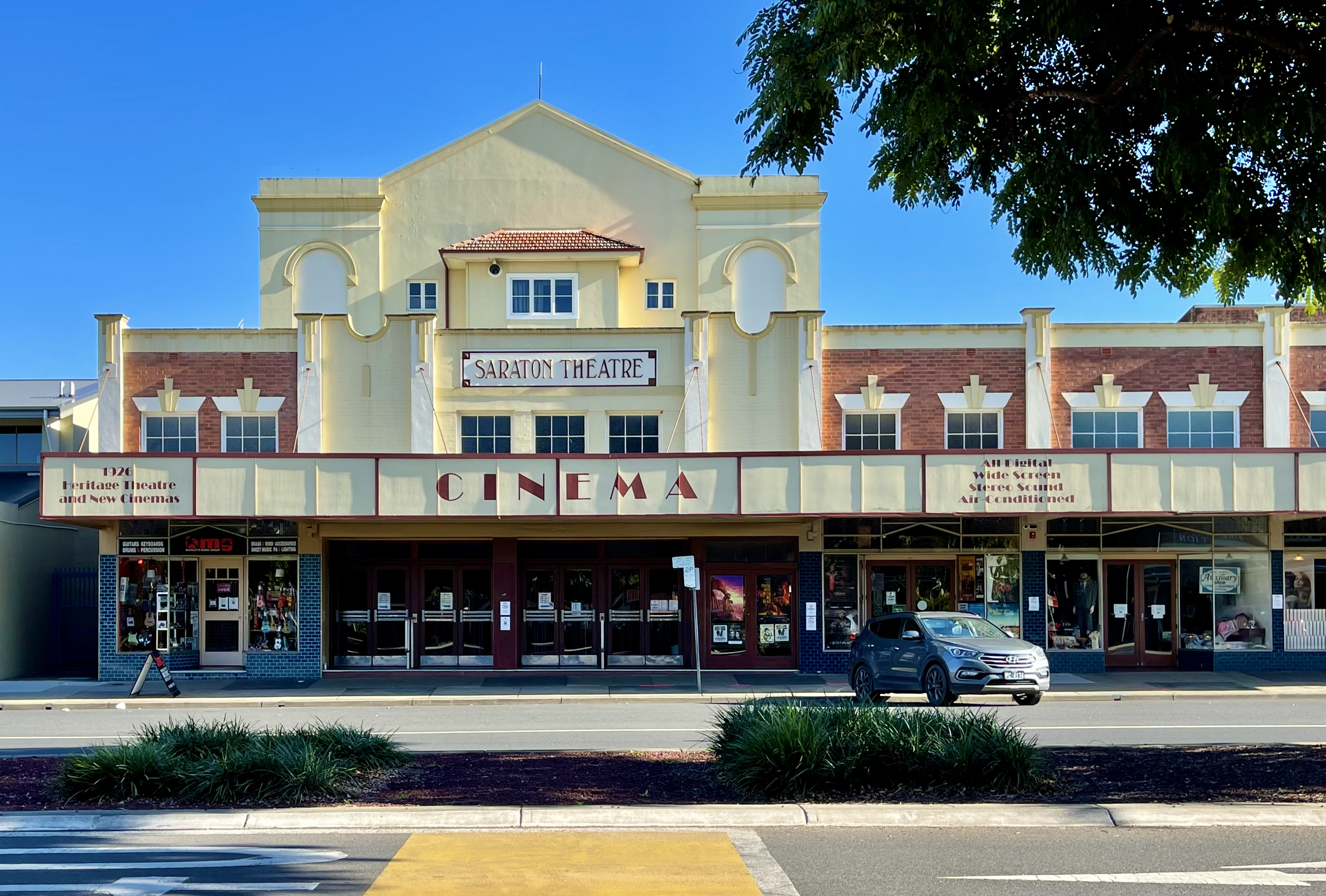
Saraton Theatre Grafton

When Notaras retired he restored his grandfather's house in the village of Frilinianika, on the island of Kythera, Greece. He also became involved with the Kytherian community there, helping to fund the purchase of equipment needed by the local hospital and aged care facility. He regularly travelled to Australia, including Grafton, where he, along with his brothers Angelo and John, and cousin Spiro, restored the heritage-listed Saraton Theatre (Notaras spelt backwards), originally built by his father and uncle in 1926. He was survived by his second wife, Bentee, his daughters Fiona, Nicola and Lorna from his first marriage, and sons Anthony and James from his second marriage.

== Philanthropy ==
Notaras funded in perpetuity a scholarship in colorectal surgery through the University of Sydney.

== Publications ==
Notaras published in various surgical journals, and wrote chapters for a number of surgical textbooks, including:

- Maingot's Textbook of Abdominal Surgery
- Rob and Smith's Textbook of Operative Surgery
- Nyhus's Textbook of Operative Surgery
- Nyhus's Textbook of Abdominal Surgery (Spanish)
- Surgical Clinics of North America.

He was a member of the editorial board of two journals:

- ColoProctology
- Hernia
