= William Vincent =

William Vincent may refer to:

== People ==
- Sir William Vincent (MP) (1615–1661), English merchant and politician
- William Vincent (priest) (1739–1815), Dean of Westminster
- William Vincent (printer) (1823–1861), New Zealand printer, publisher and publican
- William D. Vincent (1852–1922), U.S. Representative from Kansas
- Sir William Vincent (civil servant) (1866–1941), Welsh civil servant and diplomat
- Bill Vincent (born 1957), New Zealand judoka

== Others ==
- Shadows and Lies, also known as William Vincent, a 2010 romantic drama film
- William Vincent Ltd., a British coachbuilder founded in 1805
