= Saraton Theatre =

Cinema in Grafton, New South Wales, Australia

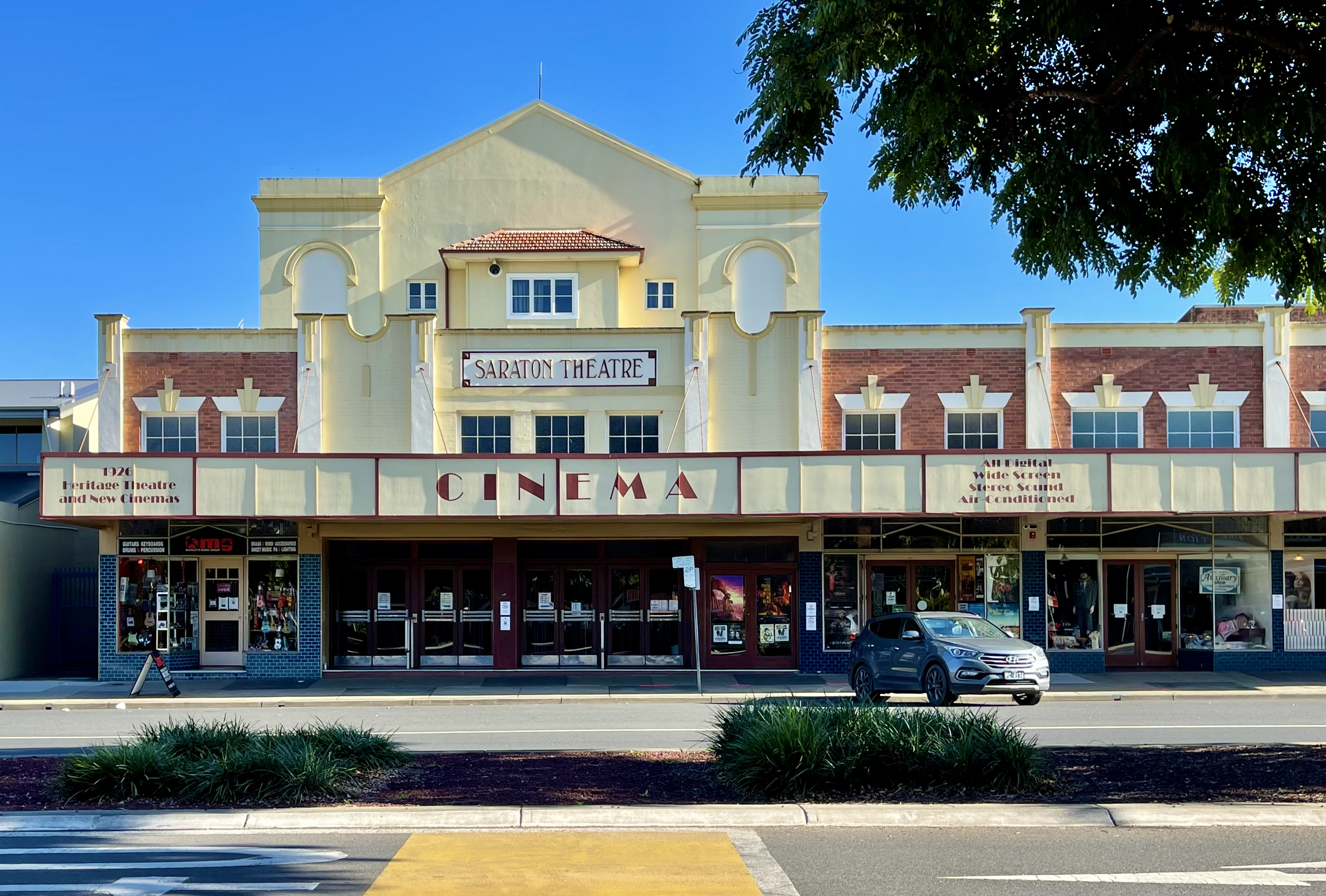

- Location within New South Wales Location within Australia
- 29.6889°S 152.9346°E
- Location: 95 Prince Street, Grafton, Clarence Valley Council, New South Wales, Australia

History
- Built: 1925–1940

Site notes
- Architect(s): Mr F. J. Board (1926) & Mr George Rae (1940) 1940: Mr George Rae; architect; from Brisbane
- Owner: Notaras Bros Entertainment Pty Ltd

New South Wales Heritage Register
- Official name: Saraton Theatre; Saraton Theatre complex including 4 shops
- Type: state heritage (built)
- Designated: 9 June 2000
- Reference no.: 1401
- Type: Theatre
- Category: Recreation and Entertainment
- Builders: Mr. J. Walters (1926) & Goddard & Goddard (1940) 1940: Messrs Goddard & Goddard from Grafton

Saraton Theatre is a heritage-listed theatre at 95 Prince Street, Grafton, Clarence Valley Council, New South Wales, Australia. It now operates both as a cinema and a venue for live performances. The original 1926 building was designed by F. J. Board and built by J. Walters, while the 1940 interior was designed by George Rae and built by Goddard & Goddard. The property is owned by Notaras Bros Entertainment Pty Ltd. It was added to the New South Wales State Heritage Register on 9 June 2000.

== History ==
=== Timeline of the theatre ===
- 1905: John (Ioannis) Notaras arrived from the island of Kythera (Greece) and joined his father who conducted a food retail shop.
- 1908: Tony (Anthony) Notaras arrived from Kythera and joined his brother and father.
- Unknown date: The brothers open a cafe in Grafton.
- 1926: Saraton Theatre is opened by the Mayor, Ald. W. T. Robinson, on 17 July. He praises the Notaras brothers by saying that the occasion only went to show that there were at least some men in this district who appreciate its value and were prepared to put in all they could to make it a better place to live in. He hoped it would be an example to many others who were reluctant to spend their money on progressive ventures to make this part of the State more attractive from the point of view of up-to-date institutions.
- 1932: A fire on the stage on 20 August damaged the floor, roof of the stage, (loudspeaker?) baffle board, screen and curtains.
- 1932: 18 November. T. J. Dorgan conducted the theatre, but it was not being used at the time.
- 1933: The theatre was still not used as a cinema, but dances and socials were being held in it.
- 1935: By 20 June a sound screen had been installed (following the fire of 1932), and the equipment in use was made by RCA (Radio Corporation of America).
- 1937: By 18 May the screen and projection/sound equipment had been removed.
- 1938/9: No films were believed to be shown, but the theatre was used for dances, concerts, and social functions.
- 1939: On 3 September, World War II was declared.
- 1940: The interior is completely remodelled to produce an ultra modern luxury theatre, on the lines of the metropolitan picture shows, with a glittering foyer laid down in rich pile carpets, and the decorative and lighting scheme blends harmoniously in cream and green, with a touch of blue and gold, while the stage is draped in gorgeous curtains, and fluted columns and frescoes give a finishing touch to a splendid interior. A detailed description of the decorative colour scheme and lighting is given in the same newspaper for 6 July 1940. It notes also that the cost was almost £4000. The architect was George Rae, from Brisbane. The opening ceremony was performed by Sir Earle Page, MHR, who congratulated T.J. Dorgan Pty Ltd and Messrs Notaras Bros on their enterprise. He emphasised how important it was to provide entertainment during times of war. Although World War II had only been progressing for less than one year, Page gave three principles on how to win the war: The third and most important [principle]of all is to keep up the spirit of the people. Men and women are better able to work hard and continuously if they are entertained. At the front in the last war [World War I] we found the lighter side relieved the tension, kept the men's nerves from snapping. I am sure that in these times we will think clearly, work better, plan straighter if we mix work with amusement, and therefore I am glad to open this place of entertainment
- 1944: On 10 May another fire occurred on the stage. The screen had to be replaced, as also was the curtains.
- 1951: New South Wales has 295 country towns containing 385 enclosed picture theatres
- 1955: A Brakelite plastic, wide screen, suitable for Cinemascope presentation, was installed on 27 April.
- 1963: The year by which television had arrived at most of the country areas. Around this time or just after, T. G. Dorgan closed the Saraton.
- 1982: 10 December. The Saraton is reopened after the auditorium has been repainted, and general refurbishment.
- 1989: On 13 January a fire, allegedly caused by an employee, destroyed the equipment in the projection box. Awaiting repairs and purchase of new equipment, films were temporarily shown in 16 mm from the front of the dress circle, commencing on 26 January. Since that fire projection of films (on a 35 mm projector with continuous platter system of feeding film) has continued.
- 1999: New South Wales country towns have only 13 picture theatres still operating in recognisable condition out of the 385 that were operating in 1951. The Saraton is one of those thirteen.

=== T. J. Dorgan ===
T. J. Dorgan conducted a small independent chain of picture theatres in the north-east towns of the state. It appears that he quite ruthlessly maintained his territory. One single-cinema operator who opened in opposition to Dorgan in Lismore explained how he had been squeezed out and closed down by, he claimed, T. J. Dorgan. Dorgan, he alleged, colluded with the film distributors to restrict product to the newcomer. Dorgan appeared to pursue similar business methods to those then conducted by the major exhibitors. They would arrange to lease an opposition theatre when the former operators were forced to close, either because of a price-war or of an inability to obtain films. They might then close it down, leaving it on hold for future use if demand, in their view, warranted its reopening.

This may be what happened to the Saraton. The timber building known as the Fitzroy Theatre opened as a skating rink (1889), was converted to a cinema in 1924 but the license was temporarily revoked in 1928 and it finally closed as a cinema late in the 1930s. Perhaps the Notaras Brothers attempted to beat Dorgan at his own game because, as well as building the Saraton, they gained control of the Fitzroy in the early 1930s. But both were leased to Dorgan who had also operated the Kinema (licensed in 1913). In a booklet on Grafton, published in 1931 (in possession of the Grafton Historical Society), Dorgan advertised that he controlled the Saraton, the Fitzroy, the Garden Theatre and the Prince Edward at South Grafton. It was only after the closure of the Fitzroy that Dorgan perhaps decided to reopen the Saraton, it also being the only well-built substantial theatre in town suitable for upgrading into a first class venue. It was Dorgan's architect who was selected to design the complete doing-over of the interior of the Saraton.

=== George Rae, architect ===
From personal communication with Mr. Les Tod, George Rae related that he had designed about 30 picture theatres in Queensland and ones at Murwillumbah, Casino, Cabramatta, Ballina, and Grafton. Amongst his other works he designed a number of Art Deco styled Commonwealth Bank branches in Queensland, and executed work for Myers stores at Tweed Heads, Cowra and Tamworth.

=== Summary of significance ===
In summary, Grafton and South Grafton possessed, at some period, at least seven theatres that were being individually used for the showing of movies. For a time four were operating simultaneously. Only the Saraton Theatre remains as representative and symbol of the time when attending a picture theatre was the principal passive recreational activity of the general population (with, on average, every Australian attending around 20 times per year).

The Saraton Theatre is representative of Greek immigrant interest in operating cinemas in NSW from 1911 to 1960 approximately. The immigration of Greek nationals to NSW showed marked differences in economic sustainability for those who came before 1950 compared to those who arrived during the mass immigration period following World War II. Prior to World War II the numbers of Greek immigrants were small and followed a system of chain migration. That is, one or two members of a family arrived, worked for other Greeks, set themselves up in some form of business, then sponsored one or more members of the family or friends, to come out and work in that business. Businesses were not set up to service other Greeks but to serve the Anglo-Celtic population.

These immigrants frequently went to country towns to set themselves up in a small catering type of business - food shops or cafes that prepared Australian-style meals. A number then moved into motion picture presentation in the same towns, again providing fare for the Anglo-Celtic population. Becoming managers of picture theatres also provided Greek immigrants with greater standing in town communities and allowed them to be better integrated into those communities.

Greek immigrants of the 19th and early 20th centuries mainly came from islands, (particularly Kythera), coastal towns and inland villages with what is described as a peasant background, often with little, if any, formal education. Between 1911 and 1947 almost half of those who arrived in NSW settled in non-metropolitan areas.

From around 1915 to the early 1960s 116 country picture theatres in NSW were at some time operated by 66 Greek immigrants in 57 towns. Thirty-four new picture theatres were built by Greek exhibitors in these towns. It is known that at least 61 of these immigrants were proprietors of their own food businesses by the time they branched into the motion picture exhibition business.

The Notaras Brothers fitted this model of arrival, extending their original father's food retailing interest to the opening of a café, then building one theatre and taking control of another in the city (the Fitzroy, now demolished); and taking control of a third in Woolgoolga. Although the Notaras Brothers leased their Grafton theatres to a local independent exhibitor (from the early 1930s to early 1960s), a member of the family, Irene Notaras, resumed operation from 1982 to today. However, in the so-called golden age of the population's high attendance at picture theatres, most Greek proprietors managed their own theatres. They controlled their town's principal entertainment when the overall population attended the cinema on average from 20 to 31 times a year at a time when there were no registered clubs, no evening opening of hotels, no television, and virtually no professional sport. They had direct input into the moral and social values of the communities in which they operated. They brought national and international events to the rural areas in the form of feature films, newsreels and documentaries.

=== Heritage listing and redevelopment ===
By 1999, the theatre was in a deteriorating condition, and a development application was lodged by the owners, the Notaras family, to demolish the theatre to build a car park for the adjacent shopping centre. Hazel Hawke, then-chair of the Heritage Council of New South Wales, visited Grafton for Heritage Week, toured the city's heritage sites and learned of the theatre's possible demolition. Hawke acted to save the building, with an interim heritage order placed on the building the same day. Spiro Notaras told The Daily Examiner in 2013: "She’s the reason we couldn’t pull it down. We cursed her for a while, but now we realise it was meant to be. I do get a kick out of seeing the building today." It received a permanent heritage order in June 2000. The family then attempted to sell the building to the Grafton City Council for $1 in the hope that they would renovate it, but the council rejected the proposal.

Spiro, Angelo, Mitchell and John Notaras then bought out all the other family members and decided to renovate the building themselves, closing the theatre in 2008 and undertaking a major multi-year redevelopment. The redevelopment added two theatrettes to the eastern side of the building, seating 130 and 140 patrons respectively. It installed facilities to allow the theatre to be used for live performances in addition to cinema screenings. It also installed a marble-floored foyer, a modern sound system and more spacious and comfortable seating, which decreased the capacity of the main theatre from 1200 to around 1050, entirely replaced the building's plumbing, and restored the interior down to small details such as the original bathroom signs.

After long delays due to various issues, the redeveloped Saraton Theatre opened after two-and-a-half years of renovations on 2 September 2010. It then held an official re-opening on 23 November, screening "Grafton at Work and Play", a silent movie which had been screened on the theatre's opening night in 1926. The redevelopment received a National Heritage Award in 2011. The first live performance took place on 7 May 2011, with country music act The McClymonts.

== Description ==
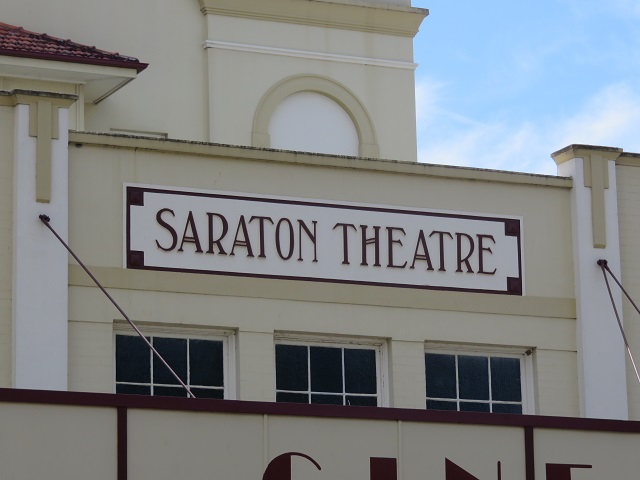
External signage

The building that comprises the Saraton Theatre and four shops is situated on the western side of Prince Street between the railway viaduct (that crosses the street) and Pound Street. It is one of only two historic buildings on the western side of Prince Street between the viaduct and Fitzroy Street - the other being the Commercial Bank Building - not to have been modified in an unsympathetic, modern commercial manner.

The Saraton building must be viewed in two separate time zones - the exterior that dates from 1926, and the interior of the theatre that dates from 1940.

The exterior

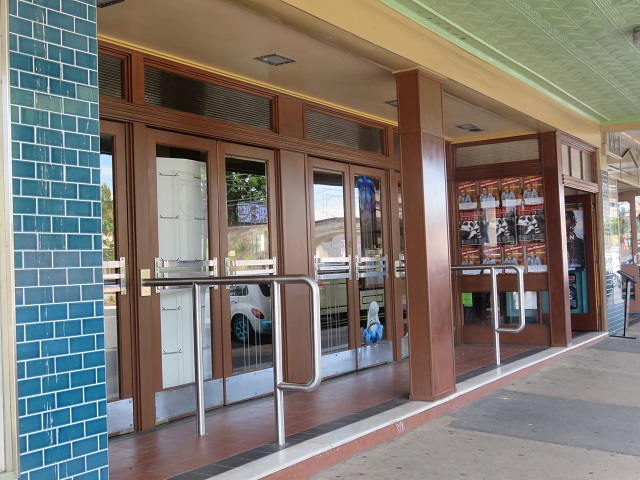
Street entrance

The building is substantial, built in (cement rendered) brick with, for the auditorium, a steel truss and corrugated iron roof. The stage is of lightweight construction, recently reclad in "Colorbond" ribbed coated steel sheeting. Portions of the theatre, such as the stairway and floor of the dress circle foyer, and projection box floor are built in reinforced concrete.

From the street there is a cantilevered awning of unusual design. It possesses an extraordinarily deep flush fascia finished in almost square panels of fibre (probably asbestos) cement without cover strips. The owners appear to have exercised moderate control over the tenants of the shops insofar that only two have painted signs on the awning fascia, and two have modified the windows on the shop fronts above the awning. Otherwise, the awning, the face-brick facade of the shops above the awning and the rendered almost Edwardian theatre facade above the awning are as original. Seven out of the eleven multi-pane windows in the facade also appear to be original to 1926.

The soffit lining to the awning is, for the length of the theatre, in pressed metal of an angular Art Deco style design (consistent with the 1940 alterations). The shop-fronts themselves are varied and not of high quality; none, except for a fragment above the door of one being original to 1926.

The pavement front to the theatre is original to the 1940 rehabilitation with the exception of the double doors or glazed panels at the northern end (in front of the candy bar or former "cafe"). The four sets of 1940 vintage double doors are handsome with their varnished timber finish and heavy triple horizontal, chrome push bars. Above the doors, for their full length, is one of the largest seen (for a single screen cinema) rear-illuminated opalescent program sign to take removable letters (for the films currently being shown). It is also a typical element of the late 1930s, but has continued through until today.

The interior prior to the 2008-10 redevelopment

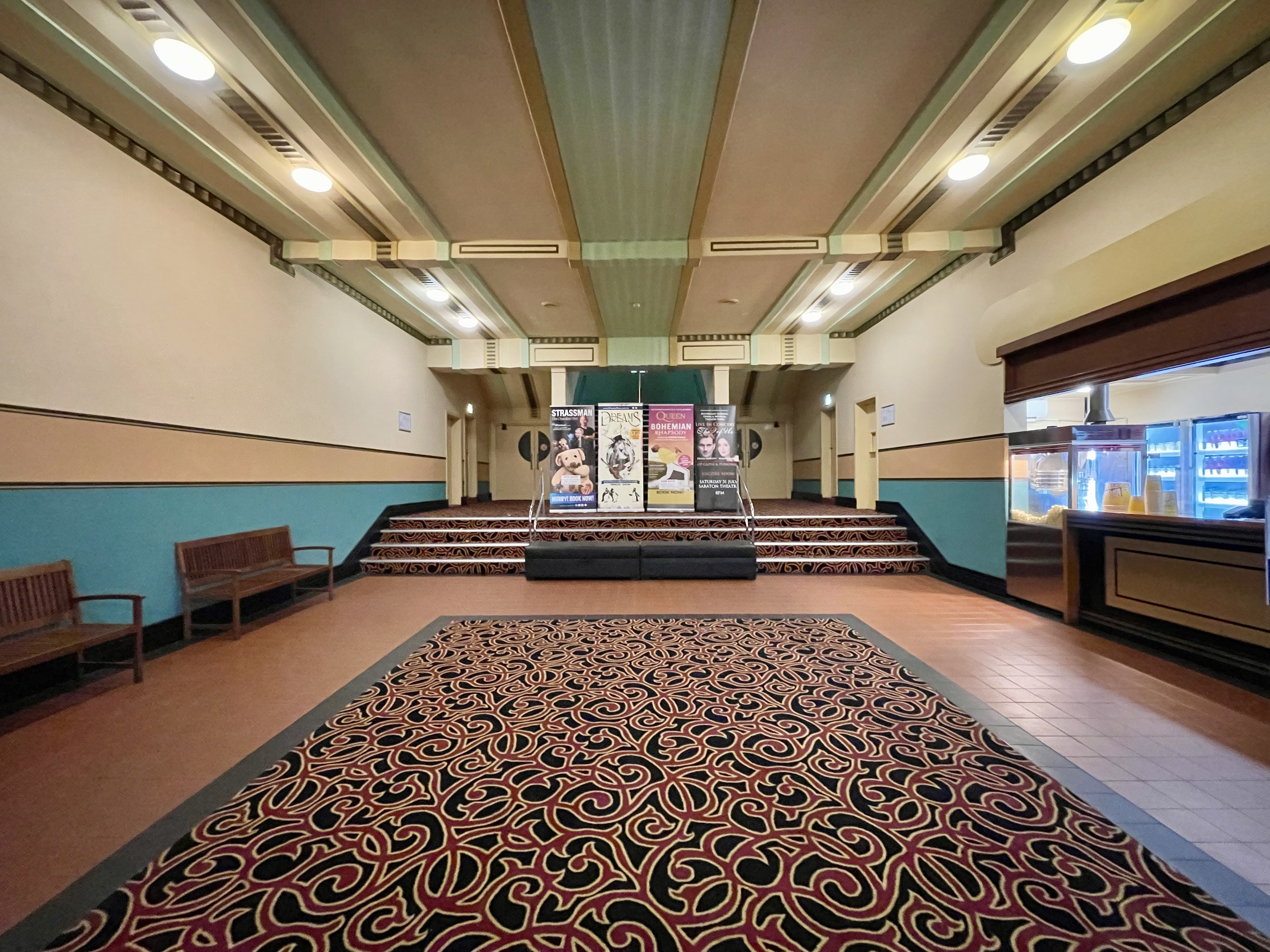
Foyer

Upon entering the front doors one is in a commodious carpeted rectangular foyer. (The foyer was also carpeted when the building was reopened in 1940; wall-to-wall carpet being indicative of a luxury rarely seen in domestic environments.) The present design gives a modest impression of Art Deco in buff and brown tonings.

Unlike so many cinemas of the 1920s and 1930s where the stairways were tucked to one side of usually a small lobby, the stairway at the Saraton is on the axis from the front door to the auditorium. For the full length of the foyer, beyond a candy bar off at the right, there is a flight of four risers to a landing directly off which leads the main stair (15 risers) up to a landing, then splitting into two dog-legs back up to the dress circle lobby. This main stair flight occupies almost one third of the width of the foyer.

On each side of the dress circle stair the lower landing continues to two sets of double doors giving entry to the stalls. The doors contain two almost half circle panels of glass (of typical late 1930s design). Along these extensions of the lower landing are the toilets, each with an illuminated frosted glass panel (above the door) painted with either a man or woman dressed in cocktail or evening dress.of the period.

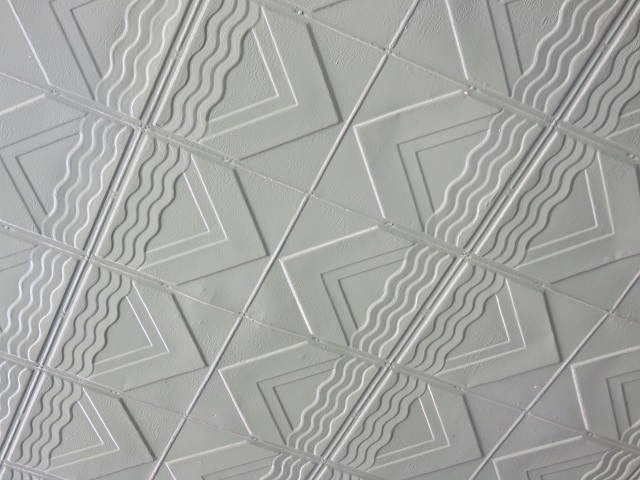
Ceilings

The ceiling is in fibrous plaster that, apart from flat sections, uses four decorative elements of what might be termed late Art Deco, but not Art Moderne. They are flat ribs, ribs of cross fluting, longitudinal panels of shallow Vee section, and longitudinal flutings. The small cornice is also fluted vertically. The ceiling is painted all-over cream at present.

The candy bar, recessed off the northern side of the foyer, has been modified since 1940 with a carpeted front to the counter. A "Formica" type laminated plastic top has replaced the original which may have been either marble or plate glass. The original display shelves and their backing behind the serving area have been replaced with simple shelves on "peg-board".

A contemporary description of the theatre mentions a mirror on the stair leading to the dress circle. It was possibly on the wall that backs the mid-landing, thus providing a greater feeling of spaciousness. The original light fittings on the ceiling have been replaced by cream opalescent glass "oyster" fittings which, although available in the 1940s, were more appropriate for plain surfaces without decoration. It is suspected that the original fittings were square boxes of "frosted" sand-blasted glass in metal frames.

With the exception of these minor points the foyer, its dado bands, skirtings, door architraves and doors, and the ceiling, remains an excellent example of a foyer for a better class of the late 1930s large theatre, built in a small country city or well-populated suburb of Sydney (in which city they are now almost all demolished).

The lobby to the dress circle is relatively narrow after entering it from the two flights of stairs that provide access. Windows are opposite the stairs as are also two toilets, above the doors of which are the same type of illuminated signs as over the toilet doors on the ground floor. At the two ends of the dress circle lobby there are (curtained only) entrances to flights of stairs leading up to the dress circle. The (non-original) ceiling light fittings are in a poor condition.

The auditorium, originally seating 1166 persons (from the 1959 Chief Secretary's license list) possesses an almost grand spatial quality. It is, for the most part, original as of 1940. The principal alteration seems to have only been the removal of some 20 wall lamps. The rectangular sand-blasted "frosted" glass flush-to-the-ceiling light fittings remain. Fortunately the owners have not been tempted to destroy the proscenium for an extra-wide screen presentation. The proscenium opening is currently about 10 metres wide - sufficiently wide for most travelling live shows if, and when these are permitted.

The 1926 interior design was plain with the roof trusses exposed. Typical of many picture theatres the bottom chord of the roof trusses were not fully horizontal: they were divided into three sections with only the central section being horizontal, while the other two sloped down to the springing point on the wall piers. The central height was dictated by the projection beam of light from the operating (bio) box to a screen that provided suitable sight-lines. Possessing a flat floor for most of the stalls floor (for social events) the stage and screen are required to be raised to provide reasonable sight-lines from this part of the auditorium. This requirement forced the trusses (and the later ceiling) to be high over the front portion of the theatre, thus creating a noble visual quality to this part of the auditorium space.

At the rear of the auditorium, over the dress circle, the roof was stepped up in relatively short lengths, to provide both adequate headroom and space for the projection light beam. The 1940 architect, George Rae, very skillfully lined the ceiling beneath the trusses' lower chords, stepping it under the raked section of the chords, but retaining flat sections as high as possible in the centre in order to prevent impediment to the beam of light. To the non-expert viewer this ceiling appears to be an abstract blocky composition of steps, overlaid with flutes and bands, tumbling down the auditorium. Apart from the now demolished Kings Theatre at Mosman (Sydney), this is the best example in NSW (now the only example) of this type of intricate design of suspended (apparent) weight within a given envelope. Apart from some criss-crossing strapping elements on the bulkhead rise linking the steps in the ceiling, the ceiling plaster repeats elements found in the foyer (except that the edge bands of vertical flutings have been painted gold which helps to accentuate the different levels of the ceiling).

The side walls have a unique pattern of grille decoration (in cast fibrous plaster) to cover the former ventilation openings. The basic pattern element is a square in which there is a hexagon, in which in turn, are three horizontal lines (forming four ventilation spaces). Sixteen of these basic elements form one panel in the stalls area, and twelve in the dress circle. Forward of the dress circle there are two panels (one above the other) in each bay between wall piers.

The splay walls that lead into the proscenium opening possess an Art Deco style element of three half (stylised) urns from which light (symbolising flames) rise, washing the wall recesses above each. Finishing each recess at the top is an inverted arrow element. Immediately in front of the stage is an orchestra pit, about 10 metres by 1.5 metres wide.

The dress circle is partially supported from the floor below by four columns. The front of the circle is the only apparent remnant of the 1926 interior. The facing to the balustrade ha been formed, in a slightly bellied shape, with sheet-metal pressed lightly with a repetitive pattern of stylised vertical "stalks". A flower or plant motif is at the top of each second stalk. The stalls floor beneath most of the dress circle has a very slight slope up towards the entrance doors, otherwise the remainder of the floor is flat extending to an orchestra pit that is immediately in front of the stage.

== Heritage listing ==
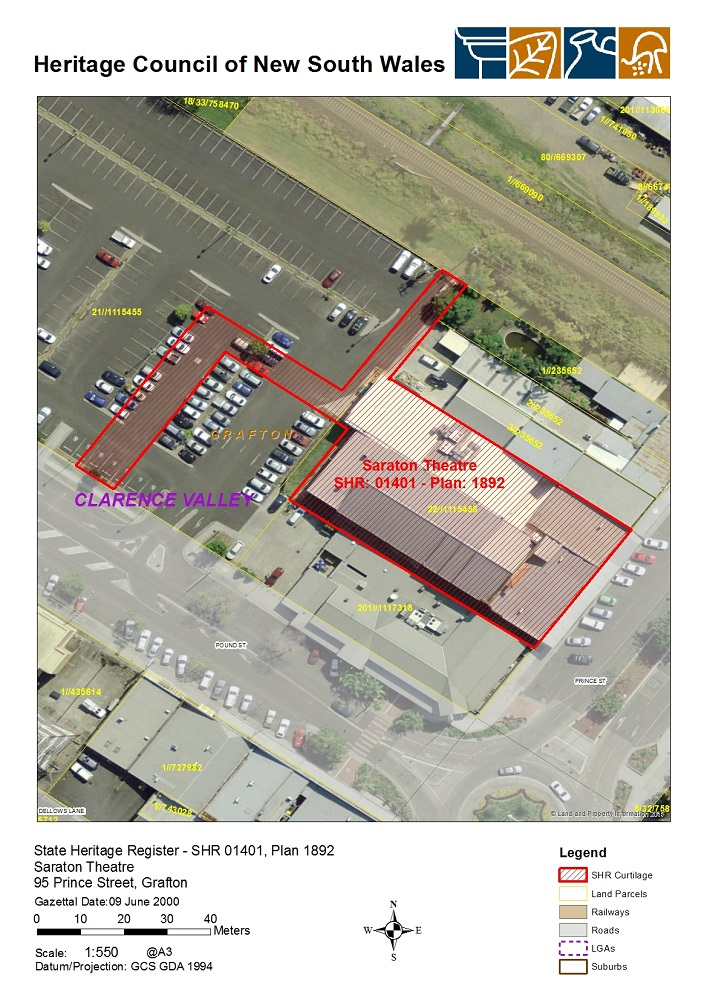
Heritage boundaries

The Saraton Theatre building is highly significant because of its integrity and rarity as an example of a picture theatre built in a small country city during the heyday of the development of, and high audience attendance for cinema (i.e. the first half of the 20th century). As an example of Greek immigrant interest in theatre construction in country NSW to supply entertainment to the majority Anglo-Celtic population, it has been owned by the Notaras family for the 73 years of its existence. As one of only 4 per cent of the country picture theatres built up to World War II, that are still operating in recognisable original condition, both its exterior 1920s style and interior late 1930s style of design provide a now rare insight into the setting of the major leisure activity of the period.

Saraton Theatre was listed on the New South Wales State Heritage Register on 9 June 2000 having satisfied the following criteria.

The place is important in demonstrating the course, or pattern, of cultural or natural history in New South Wales.

It is important in the course or pattern of NSW's cultural history because, like the very few remaining picture theatres of its era it is of historic, social and cultural significance due to 'its association with past events, persons and groups who contributed or participated in an important social and cultural phenomenon of the 20th century, namely "movie going". The importance of such historical phase or phenomenon may be gauged...by its physical manifestations, including the number of theatre buildings then existing [from 1910 to 1960], the amount of employment created, the fact that "picture going" was second only to sport as a leisure time activity, and by its impact on popular taste of the time where concerned with fashion, design generally, language, music and behaviour. Such phenomenon can . . . be regarded . . . as being "historic - meaning noted in history" and 'historical - belonging to history'

Special association with the life or works of a person: As far as is known it only has a modest link to Sir Earle Page, MHR for the district, former long-time leader of the Country Party, Deputy Prime Minister first to Stanley Melbourne Bruce, then to Ben Lyons; and Prime Minister for a brief period. The importance of this link is the importance he placed on entertainment (and therefore their settings) for the general population (as well as the armed forces) during times of war, when he reopened the Saraton Theatre in 1940.

The place is important in demonstrating aesthetic characteristics and/or a high degree of creative or technical achievement in New South Wales.

The item is quite important to Grafton and NSW for its aesthetic characteristics - they denoting its being one of the few superior designed buildings of the first half of the 20th century that remain in the commercial centre of Grafton. It is noteworthy for both the external (1926) streetscape and internal rebuilding (1940). For the state of NSW it represents the best of what was built in a country city of modest size - its owners being complimented by the Mayor in 1926 for investing so much money, and for their setting an example to other people in the town whom he hoped would follow suit. The theatre has been noted for its aesthetic qualities, together with a recommendation for its retention, in the 1984 Report to the Heritage Council, Theatres/Cinemas in New South Wales by R. Thorne with K. Cork and L. Tod; and again in Thorne, Tod and Cork (1996, p. 266 ) and Thorne, Tod and Cork (1997, p. 275) where it was claimed that "the theatre is one of the most decorative and architecturally handsome in NSW".

The place has strong or special association with a particular community or cultural group in New South Wales for social, cultural or spiritual reasons.

The Saraton represents the involvement by Greek immigrants during the first half of the 20th century in the exhibition of films in country towns. Out of the 385 country picture theatres at some time owned and/or operated by Greek immigrants this is possibly the last being operated by members of the family of the original Greek entrepreneurs. It makes a century of involvement in Grafton by the Notaras.

The place has potential to yield information that will contribute to an understanding of the cultural or natural history of New South Wales.

The Saraton Theatre, as erected in the period when attending a picture theatre was second only to active (non-professional) sport as a leisure pastime, can be regarded as a physical record of the important social and cultural phenomenon of cinema at a time when going to the pictures was almost a universal regular activity. (Entertainment Tax on admissions shows that many more people attended picture theatres than all sports, including racing, combined, on an annual basis.) This theatre, as with other types of the genre that are in rare quantity in the state, shows young people and future generations what it was like for their forebears to attend cinema and participate in the major commercial leisure and social activity of the time (from, say, 1910 to 1960).

The place possesses uncommon, rare or endangered aspects of the cultural or natural history of New South Wales.

The Saraton Theatre is an example of a building type and style that was once common in country towns but now rare with only 14 still operating, and in recognisable original condition to their pre-World War II designs (13 of which were built before 1942). In 1951 there were 385 enclosed movie theatres in 295 country towns in NSW. In 1999 only 66 country towns possess 83 cinema buildings containing 184 screens. (Source for 1951: A list compiled from the Film Weekly Motion Picture Directory, 1951–52 with town entries checked against "urban centres" in the 1954 ABS Census. The source for 1999 is a table compiled by R. Thorne and L. Tod from the Movie Theatre Heritage Register for NSW, 1896–1996, and personal files.) The Saraton is therefore one of nearly four per cent of country picture theatres still operating in relatively original design condition as existed in the first half of the 20th century. Its interior also symbolises the design of many Sydney suburban cinemas that were built or refurbished in the 1930s, almost all of which have been demolished.

The place is important in demonstrating the principal characteristics of a class of cultural or natural places/environments in New South Wales.

The Saraton very well demonstrates the principal characteristics of the settings or environments built in the larger country towns or populous Sydney suburbs for the viewing of the cultural phenomenon of the 20th century namely, movie film-recorded performance of traditional narrative stories, and film-recorded news and information documents.
