= Cangai, New South Wales =

Cangai
- Town
- Interactive map of Cangai
- Coordinates: 29°30′23.3″S 152°28′50.2″E
- Country: Australia
- State: New South Wales
- LGA: Clarence Valley Council

Government
  - State electorate: Clarence
  - Federal division: Page

Population
  - Total: 17 (2021 census)
- Postcode: 2460

Cangai is a locality in Clarence Valley Council LGA, within the Northern Rivers region of New South Wales, Australia. There was once a mining village of the same name, now a ghost town. Cangai lies near the Gibraltar Range, within the catchment of Mann River, which flows through the eastern part of the locality. The Gwyder Highway passes through it. It is approximately 70 km west-north-west of Grafton by road.

The area now known as Cangai lies on the traditional land of Gumbaynggirr people. Cangai takes its name from a pastoral run of approximately 8000 acres, originally known as 'Cangi', on the Mann River. It was taken from the local people, by Brisco Ray, around 1845. Two supposed explanations for the name 'Cangi' were that it is either from a local Aboriginal word 'Coong' meaning water or from 'Cangi', meaning 'men of the river branch', in Celtic. The further explanation of the Celtic name is that the Mann River (then called Mitchell River) was also known unofficially as 'the South Branch' (of Clarence River, with the Clarence itself, upstream of the confluence, being 'the North Branch'). The true origin of the name is unclear.

There was gold mining in the area, followed by the operation of the Cangai copper mine and its smelters, by Grafton Copper Mining Company Limited, from 1905 to 1917. In 1910, the Cangai copper mine ranked, behind the Great Cobar mine, as the second largest copper mine in New South Wales, by production, even if at a time when many other copper producing areas had closed down.

In 1861, alluvial gold was found on Mann River at Cangai, followed by the discovery of reef gold. By 1868, other reefs had been found and reef mining came to predominate. The Cangai Goldfield was proclaimed in 1873. A settlement called Cangai was founded during the days of gold mining. The first school opened there in 1896. Gold mining was already in decline, before the chance discovery, by a man hunting koala for skins, of a mineralised outcrop containing copper ore in 1901.

The former village and copper smelter site were located on Yantalla Creek (a tributary of Mann River), between two of its right bank tributaries Bobward Creek and Smelter Creek. Cangai grew rapidly when copper mining commenced. By 1908, it had a population of around 800, and had one hotel, a public hall, a school, a police station, two general stores and two butcher shops. In 1910, records show that there were 37 Aboriginal people living at Cangai. In 1911, an 8 km long narrow-gauge tramway was put into service to supply the reverberatory furnaces with timber to be used as fuel. An inclined tramway brought the ore, to smelters from the mine that was located in the hills above the village, downhill to where it could be carried over haul roads to the smelter, which was just outside the village. The copper smelter and open-air ore 'calcination' process resulted in extensive air pollution with sulphur dioxide. A coach provided the village's link to the outside world, a six-hour long journey to a connection with the steamer, Pearl, at the river port of Copmanhurst, the head of navigation on the Clarence River. The same road route was used to ship smelted copper.

The population declined rapidly after mining ceased. The Cangai Hotel closed at the end of June 1932. The school closed in February 1942. An eroded area alongside Smelter Creek is all that remains of the once extensive copper smelters. All that remains of the village is the former police house and the road known as Cangai Post Office Road. On the other side of Bobward Creek from the old village's site is the village's old cemetery.

In 1993, the twenty-six hour long Cangai siege took place, in what was by then a quiet rural locality.

Although there has been some mineral exploration at Cangai, mining never resumed after 1917. The area remains prospective.
