= Cangai Copper Mine =

Mine in New South Wales, Australia

Coordinates: 29.5°S 152.489722222°E

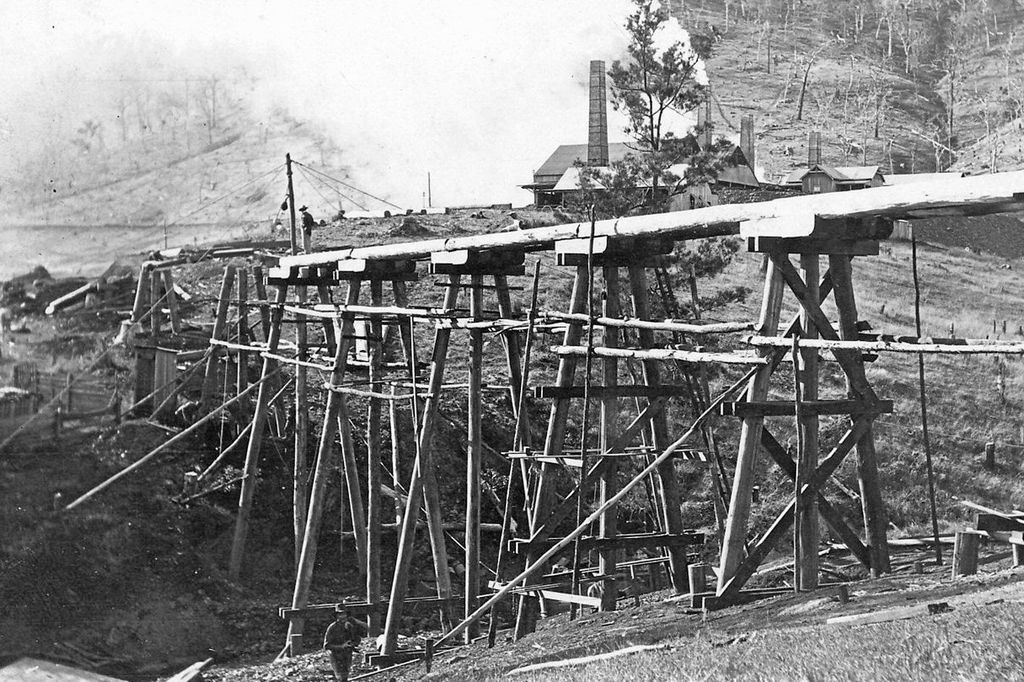
Construction of the tramway at Cangai Copper Mine, 1910/11

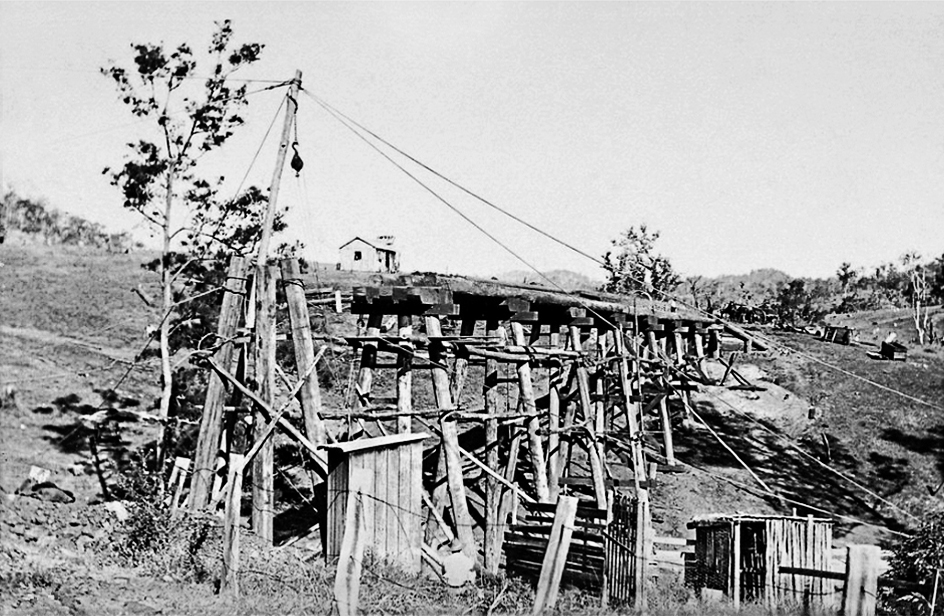
Construction of the tramway at Cangai Copper Mine, 1910/11

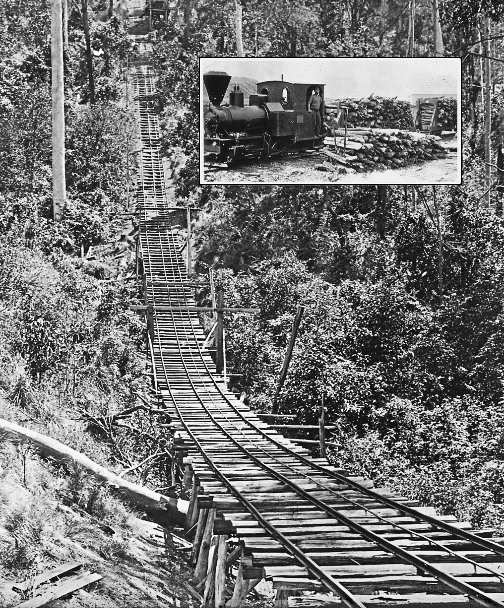
Tramway at Cangai Copper Mine and O&K loco (insert), 1910–1917

The Cangai Copper Mine was operated by Grafton Copper Mining Company Ltd at Cangai in northern New South Wales from 1904 to 1917.

== History ==
The mine was situated about two miles east of the village of Cangai.

The mine plant included a smelter and a narrow gauge locomotive-hauled tramway for transporting the firewood needed to fuel it. The mine paid rich dividends because of quality of the ore and other economies in production, including that the ore was self-fluxing and it could easily be transported downhill to the smelters.

The company was set up by a group of Grafton businessmen, who were able to exercise local control over operations, unlike many other Australian mining ventures. Blister copper was transported to Copmanhurst wharf on the Clarence River by horse team. As timbered areas close to the mine were cut out, difficulties in transporting sufficient firewood for the smelters led to the construction of a 4-mile (6.4 kilometre) 2 ft 6 in (762 mm) gauge tramway in 1910/11. The Australian Metal Company supplied rails and rolling stock imported from Germany, including a locomotive built in Berlin by Orenstein & Koppel. Wartime difficulties led to the copper smelter ceasing production before the end of 1916, and the mine was exhausted by the end of 1917.

In 1920, the locomotive and rolling stock was sold for use in Tasmania at the Tasmanian Timber and Tramway Company at Bridport.

Little now (2017) remains of the mine, smelters and tramway. The last of the smelter chimneys was demolished in 2009 for North Coast Copper Mines.
