= Grafton, New South Wales =

City in Australia

Grafton
- City
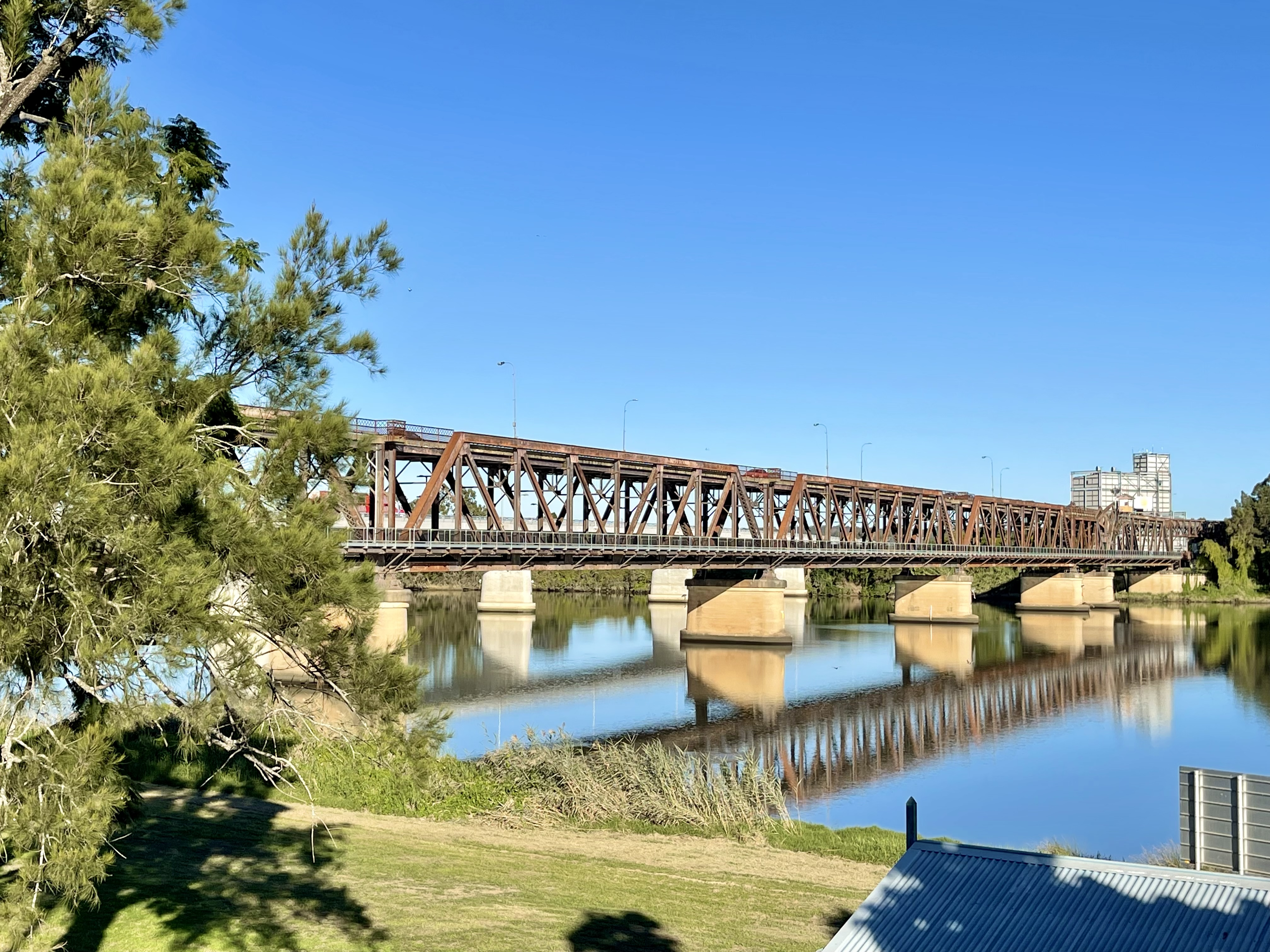
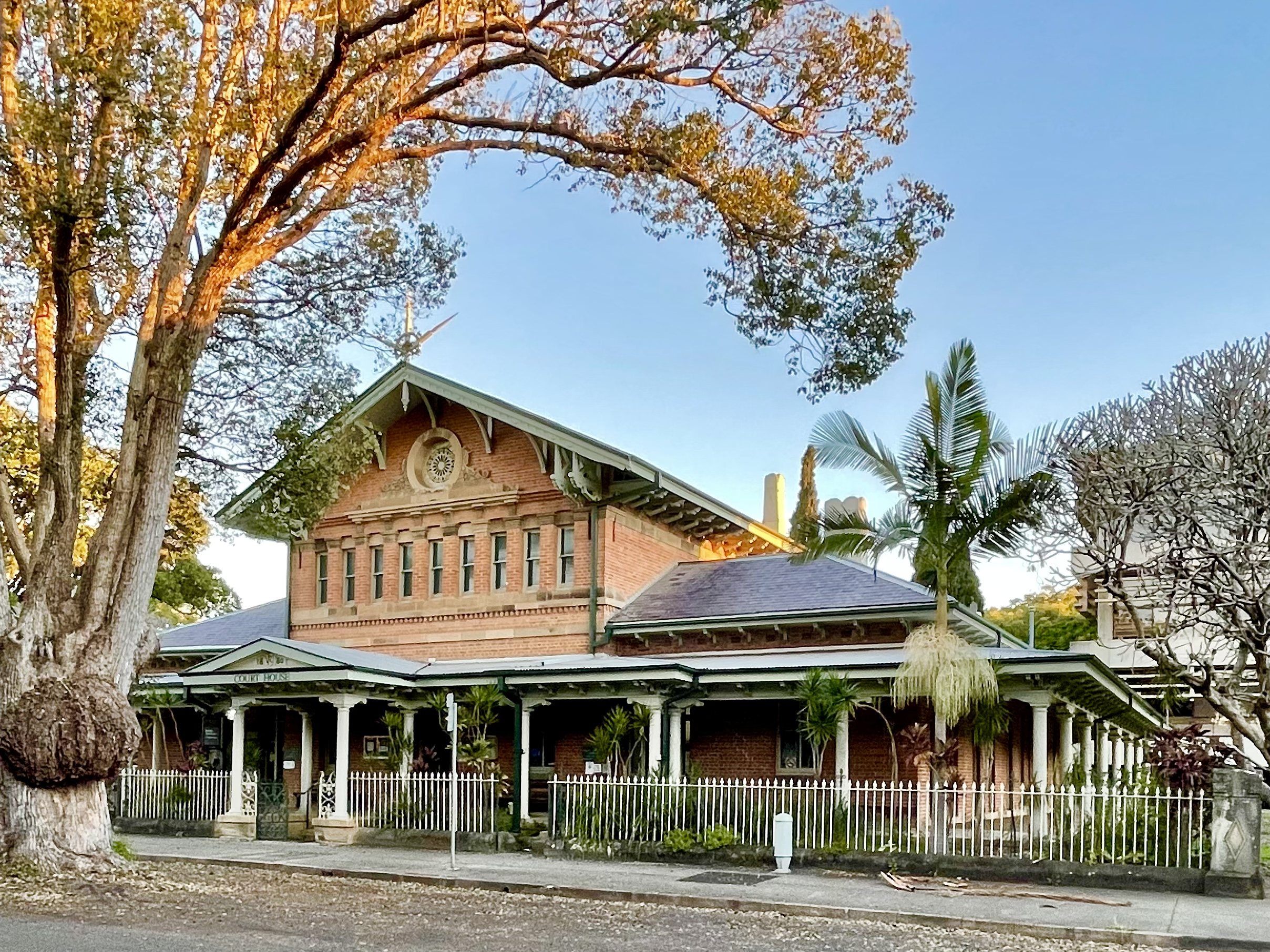
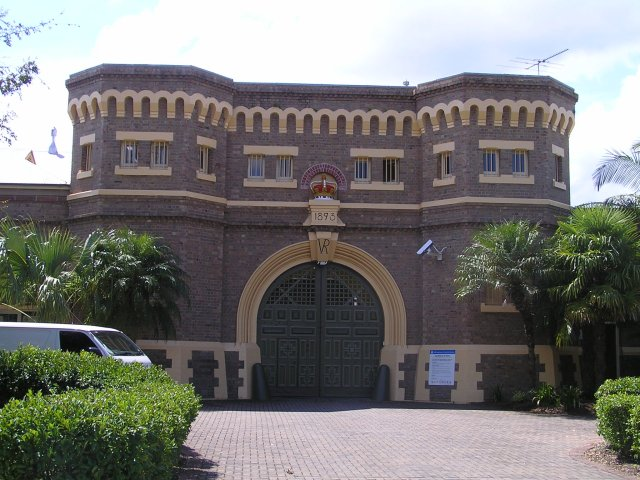
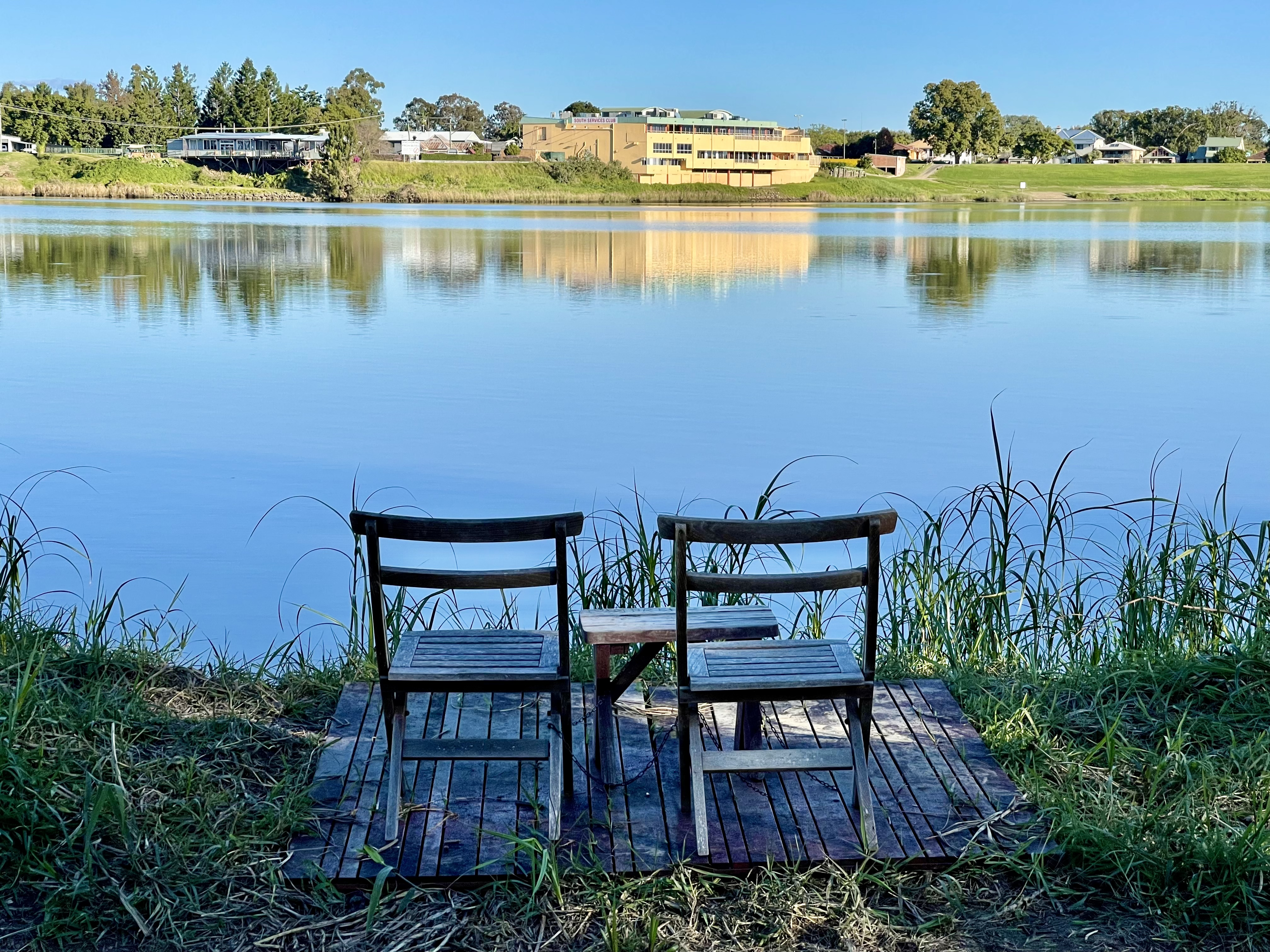
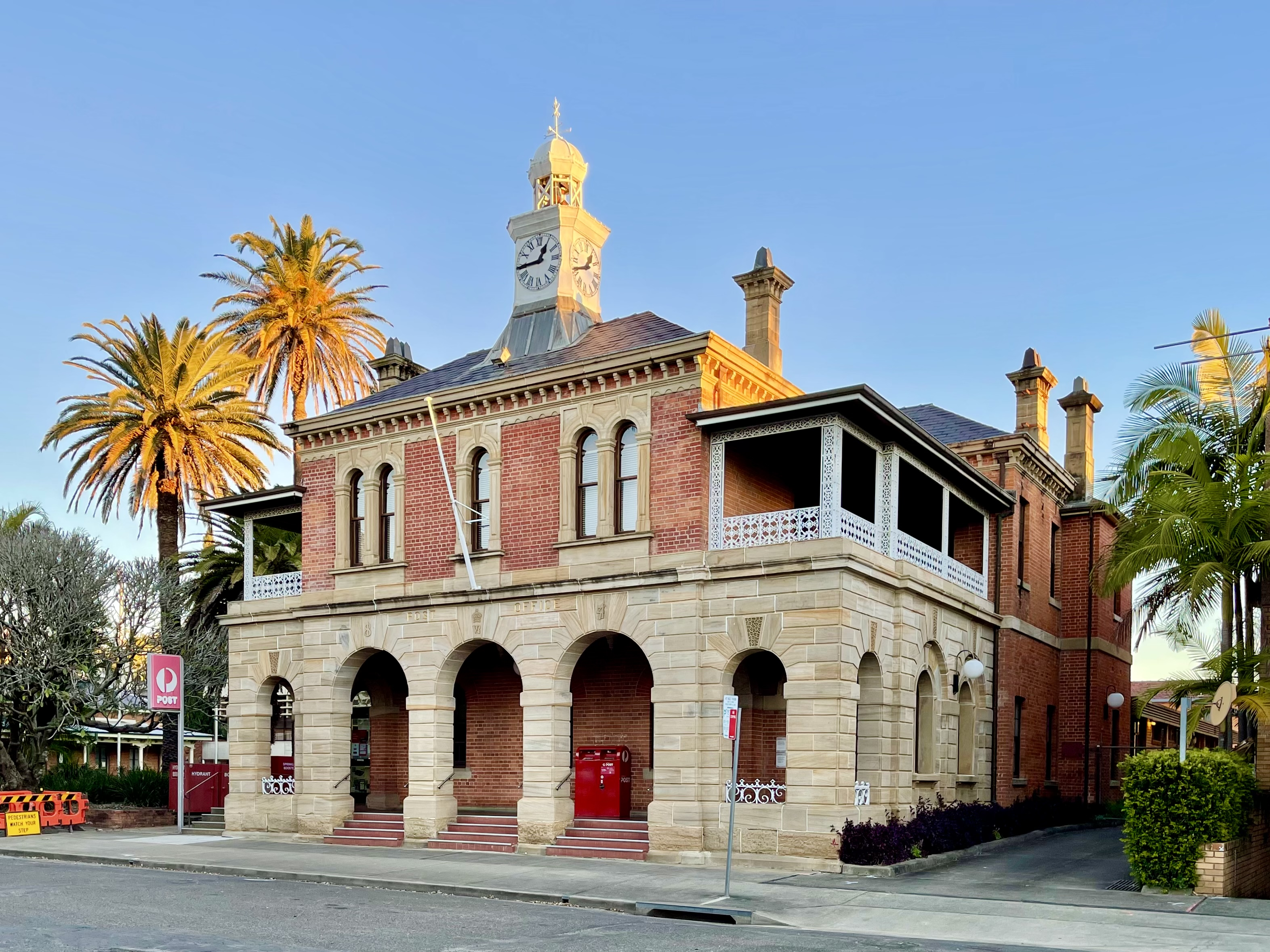
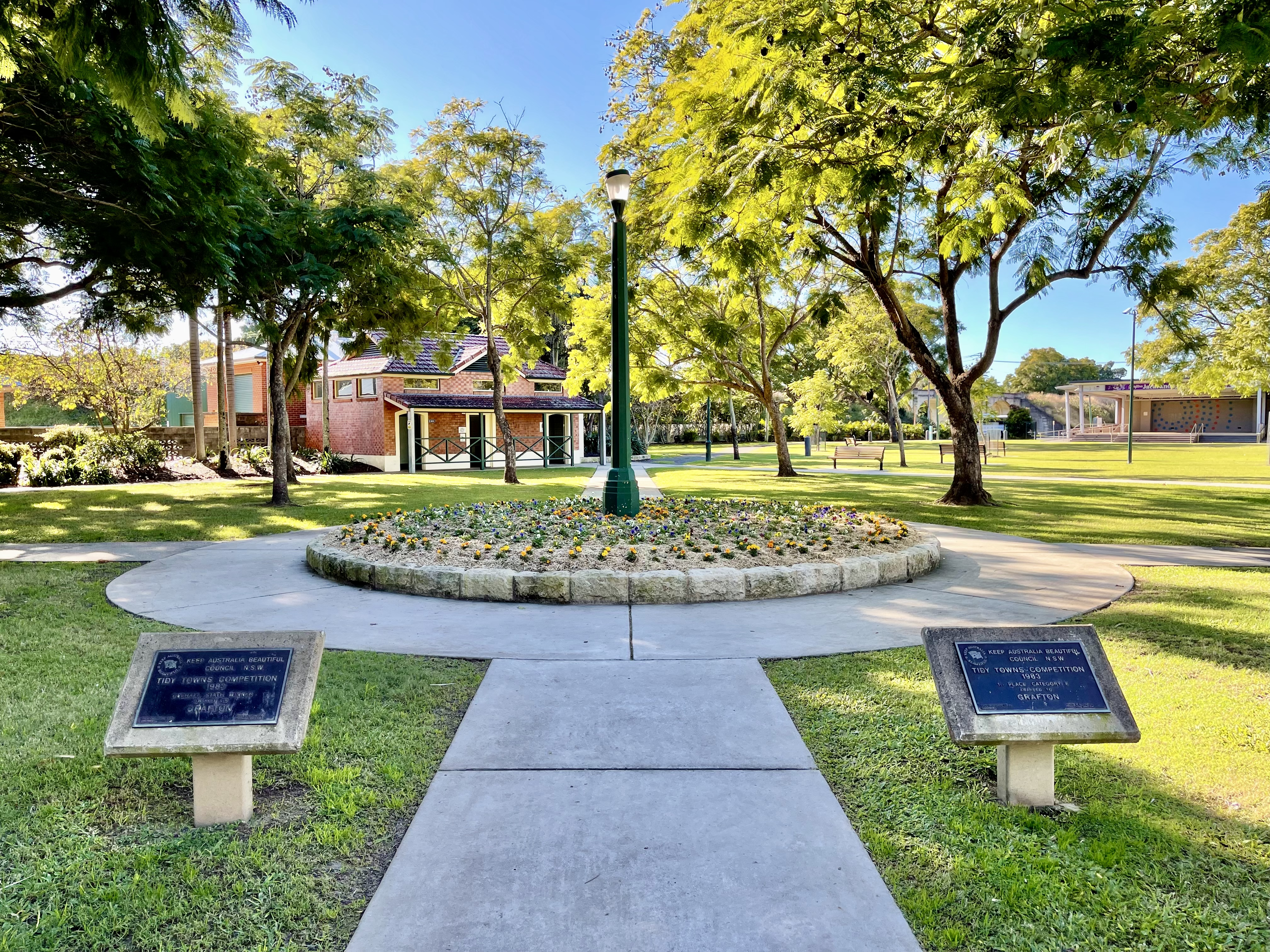
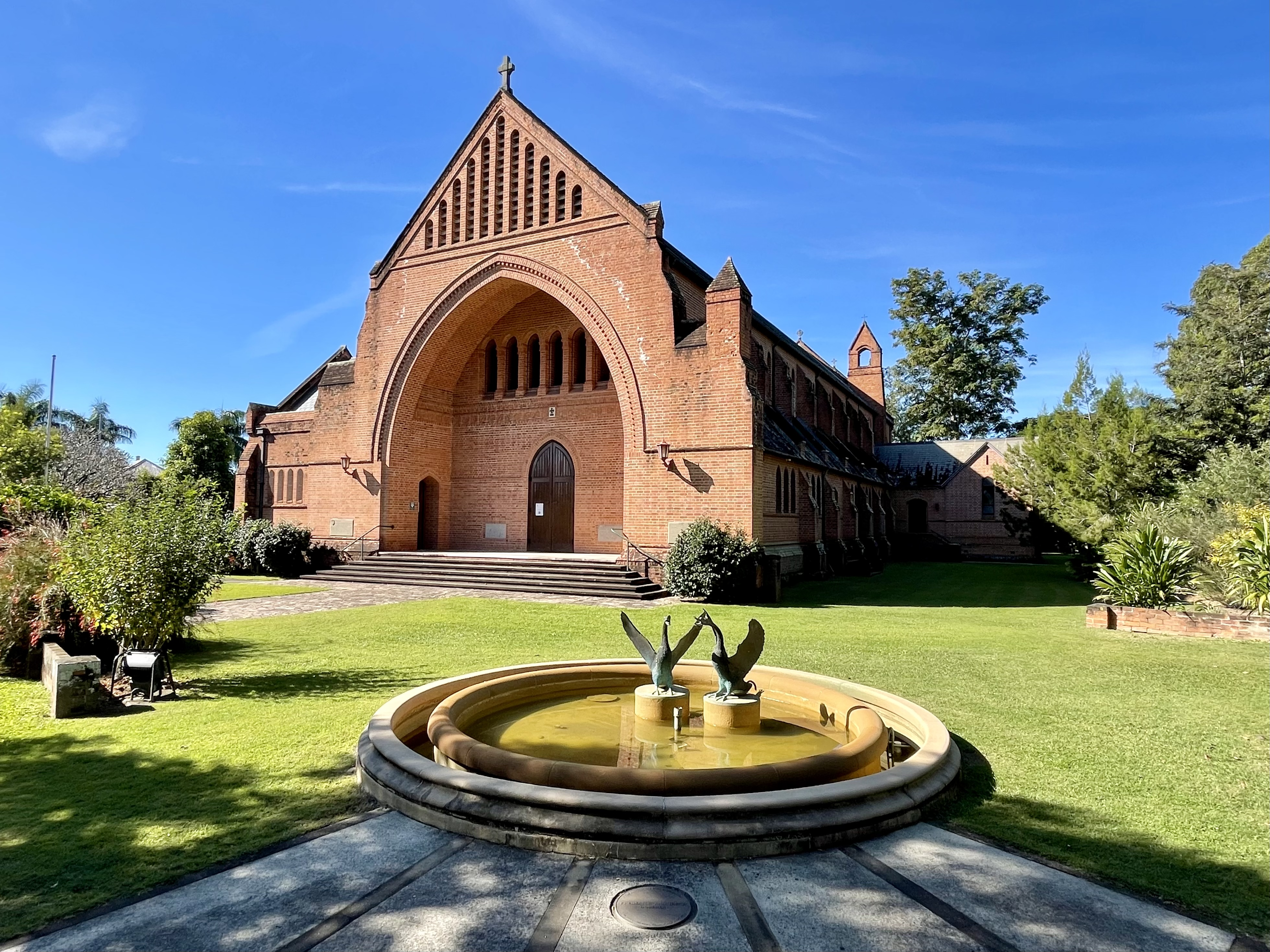
- (From left to right); Grafton Bridge from North Bank; Grafton Court House, Grafton Gaol; Clarence River, Grafton Post Office; Market Square, Christ Church Cathedral

- Interactive map of Grafton
- Coordinates: 29°41′0″S 152°56′0″E
- Country: Australia
- State: New South Wales
- Region: Northern Rivers
- LGA: Clarence Valley Council
- Location: 620 km (390 mi) N of Sydney; 315 km (196 mi) S of Brisbane; 161 km (100 mi) E of Glen Innes; 82 km (51 mi) NNW of Coffs Harbour; 61 km (38 mi) SW of Yamba
- Established: 1851

Government
  - State electorate: Clarence
  - Federal division: Page
- Elevation: 5 m (16 ft)

Population
  - Total: 19,255 (2021)
- Postcode: 2460
- County: Clarence
- Mean max temp: 25.8 °C (78.4 °F)
- Mean min temp: 12.8 °C (55.0 °F)
- Annual rainfall: 1,175.2 mm (46.27 in)

Grafton (Bundjalung: Gumbin Gir) is a city in the Northern Rivers region of the Australian state of New South Wales. It is located on the Clarence River, on a floodplain, approximately 620 kilometres (385 mi) by road north-northeast of the state capital Sydney.

The closest major cities, Brisbane and the Gold Coast, are located across the border in South East Queensland. At the 2021 census, Grafton had a population of 19,255. The city is the largest settlement and, with Maclean, the shared administrative centre of the Clarence Valley Council local government area, which is home to over 50,000 people in all.

== History ==
Before European settlement, the Clarence River marked the border between the Bundjalung and Gumbaynggirr peoples, and so descendants of the speakers of both language-groups can now be found in the Grafton region.

Grafton, like many other settlements in the area, was first opened up to European settlement by the cedar-getters. An escaped convict, Richard Craig, explored the district in 1831. With the wealth of "red gold" cedar just waiting for exploitation, he was given a pardon and one hundred pounds to bring a party of cedar-getters on the cutter Prince George to the region. Word of such wealth to be had did not take long to spread. One of the arrivals on the Susan in 1838, pioneer John Small, first occupied land on Woodford Island. 'The Settlement' (as the embryonic Grafton was then imaginatively named) was established shortly after.

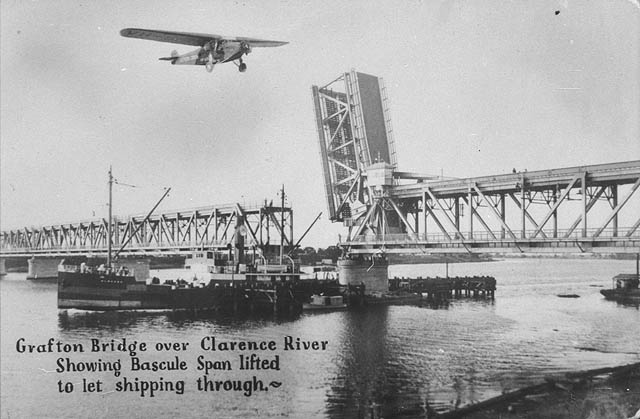
Grafton Bridge over the Clarence River showing the bascule span lifted to let shipping through. (Postcard from about 1932; the Southern Cross aeroplane has been added to the photograph.)

In 1851 Governor FitzRoy officially named the town Grafton, after his grandfather, the Duke of Grafton, who had served as Prime Minister of the United Kingdom from 1768 to 1770. Grafton was proclaimed a city in 1885. Local industries include logging, beef cattle, fishing/prawning, sugar, manufacturing and tourism.

The Grafton Bridge, connecting the main townsite with South Grafton, opened in 1932. It completed the standard-gauge rail connection between Sydney and Brisbane, also forming a vital link for the Pacific Highway. Previously the only way to travel from Grafton to South Grafton was via ferry. As a result, South Grafton developed quite a separate identity, and in fact had its own municipal government from 1896 to 1956.

The introduction of fluoride to the town water supply in 1964 was accompanied by protest which became physical. The fluoride plant was blown up the night before commencement, the dentist supporting fluoridation received bomb threats against his family and later pro- and anti-fluoridation float participants at the annual Jacaranda Festival came to blows and a gun was produced.

== Heritage listings ==
Grafton has a number of heritage-listed sites, including:

- Duke Street: Christ Church Cathedral
- 170 Hoof Street: Grafton Correctional Centre
- North Coast railway: Grafton Bridge
- 95 Prince Street: Saraton Theatre
- 150 Victoria Street: Arcola, Grafton

== Demographics ==
Historical population
Year	Pop.	±%
1921	6,358	—
1933	8,551	+34.5%
1947	12,025	+40.6%
1954	13,365	+11.1%
1961	15,526	+16.2%
1966	15,987	+3.0%
1971	16,387	+2.5%
1976	16,516	+0.8%
1981	17,005	+3.0%
1986	16,647	−2.1%
1991	16,642	−0.0%
1996	16,562	−0.5%
2001	17,380	+4.9%
2006	17,501	+0.7%
2011	16,598	−5.2%
2016	16,787	+1.1%
2021	17,155	+2.2%
Source: Australian Bureau of Statistics data.

At the 2021 census, Grafton had a population of 19,255.

According to the Census:

- Aboriginal and Torres Strait Islander people made up 10.4% of Grafton's population.
- 87.1% of people were born in Australia. The next most common countries of birth were England 1.4% and New Zealand 0.7%.
- 90.5% of people spoke only English at home.
- The most common responses for religion were No Religion 37.8%, Anglican 20.9%, and Catholic 18.2%.

== Climate ==
Grafton has a humid subtropical climate (Köppen: Cfa, Trewartha: Cfal) with significantly more rainfall in summer than in winter. Rainfall is lower than in stations directly on the coast, but monthly rain totals can often surpass 300 millimetres (12 in). The wettest month since records began was March 1974 when Cyclone Zoe produced a monthly total of 549.0 millimetres (21.61 in), whilst during periods of anticyclonic control and strong westerly winds monthly rainfall can be very low; for instance in August 2017 only 0.2 millimetres (0.01 in) fell. Grafton gets around 115.2 clear days on an annual basis.

Grafton like many NSW regional centres, is affected by heatwaves in the summer months. On 12 February 2017 Grafton recorded a maximum temperature of 46.3 °C (115.3 °F), the city's highest recorded temperature since records began in 1966. Winter has a relatively high diurnal range.

Climate data for Grafton Airport AWS (2006–2022)
Month	Jan	Feb	Mar	Apr	May	Jun	Jul	Aug	Sep	Oct	Nov	Dec	Year
Record high °C (°F)	41.3 (106.3)	45.8 (114.4)	37.2 (99.0)	32.4 (90.3)	29.6 (85.3)	29.7 (85.5)	27.7 (81.9)	36.3 (97.3)	38.3 (100.9)	39.7 (103.5)	42.8 (109.0)	41.3 (106.3)	45.8 (114.4)
Mean daily maximum °C (°F)	30.3 (86.5)	29.6 (85.3)	28.1 (82.6)	25.7 (78.3)	23.2 (73.8)	20.6 (69.1)	20.6 (69.1)	22.5 (72.5)	24.8 (76.6)	26.7 (80.1)	28.5 (83.3)	29.2 (84.6)	25.8 (78.5)
Mean daily minimum °C (°F)	19.0 (66.2)	18.9 (66.0)	17.6 (63.7)	13.8 (56.8)	9.6 (49.3)	7.1 (44.8)	5.4 (41.7)	5.9 (42.6)	9.7 (49.5)	12.9 (55.2)	15.8 (60.4)	17.5 (63.5)	12.8 (55.0)
Record low °C (°F)	10.8 (51.4)	12.4 (54.3)	9.6 (49.3)	0.4 (32.7)	−1.5 (29.3)	−1.8 (28.8)	−3.4 (25.9)	−2.8 (27.0)	0.1 (32.2)	3.2 (37.8)	6.0 (42.8)	8.6 (47.5)	−3.4 (25.9)
Average rainfall mm (inches)	122.4 (4.82)	177.9 (7.00)	180.2 (7.09)	84.8 (3.34)	72.9 (2.87)	83.0 (3.27)	32.1 (1.26)	55.3 (2.18)	50.6 (1.99)	74.9 (2.95)	101.4 (3.99)	117.1 (4.61)	1,175.2 (46.27)
Average rainy days (≥ 1.0 mm)	10.4	10.9	11.2	8.0	7.5	5.8	4.6	4.3	5.2	7.2	9.2	10.2	94.5
Average afternoon relative humidity (%)	56	60	59	57	57	54	49	43	44	49	52	54	53
Average dew point °C (°F)	19.0 (66.2)	19.3 (66.7)	17.9 (64.2)	15.2 (59.4)	12.6 (54.7)	9.8 (49.6)	7.9 (46.2)	7.2 (45.0)	9.6 (49.3)	12.8 (55.0)	15.3 (59.5)	17.8 (64.0)	13.7 (56.7)
Source 1: Bureau of Meteorology
Source 2: Bureau of Meteorology (Humidity from Grafton Olympic Pool, 1976–2010)

== Culture ==
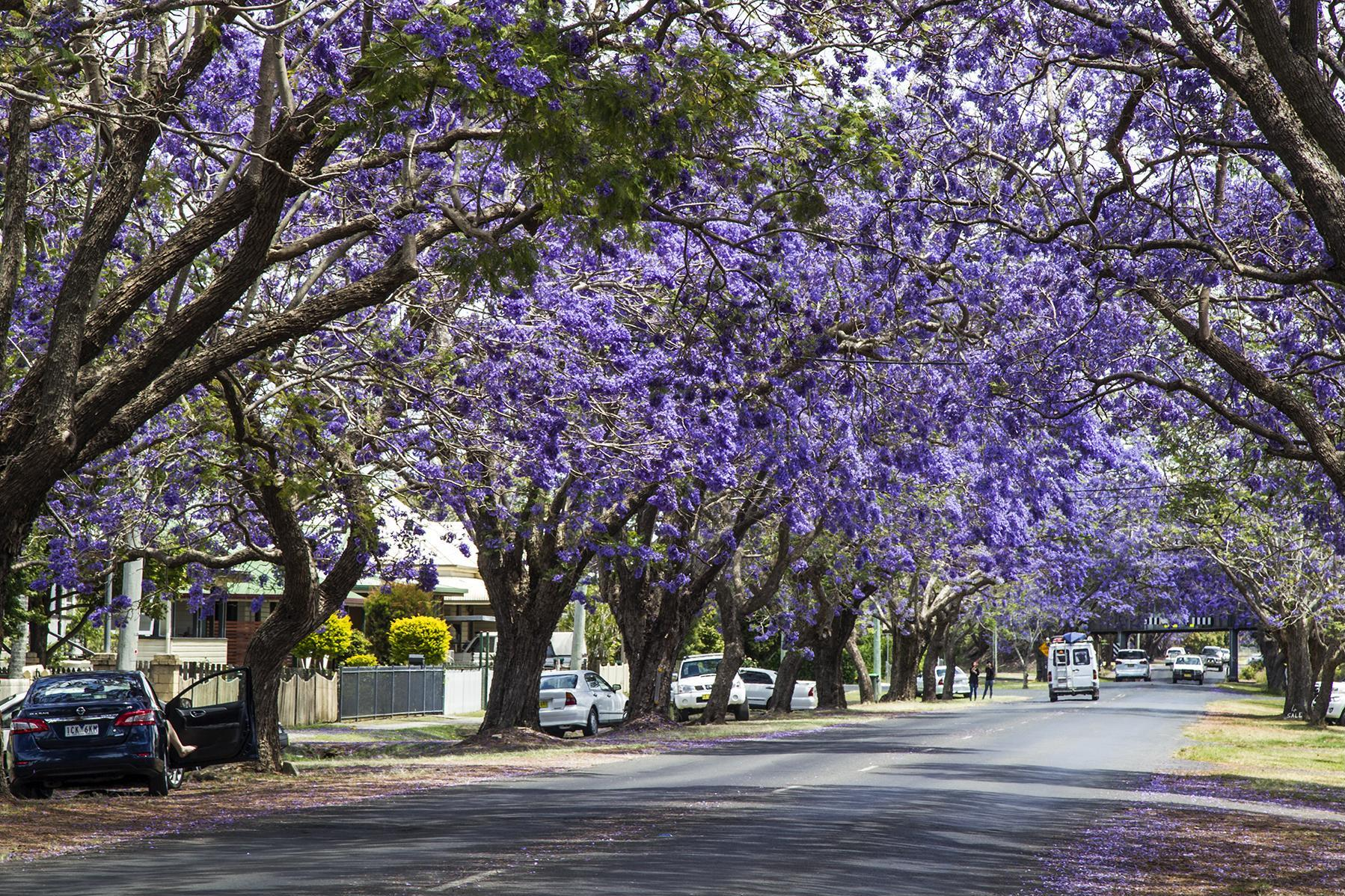
Jacaranda lined street in the suburbs of Grafton

Grafton is known and promoted as the Jacaranda City, in reference to its tree-lined streets and to the annual Jacaranda Festival. Inaugurated in 1935, Jacaranda is held each October/November. A half-day public holiday is observed locally on the first Thursday of November, the Festival's major focal day. During the 1963 festival, inventor John W. Dickenson demonstrated on the Clarence River the first hang glider that was controlled by weight shifts of the pilot from a swinging control frame – the birth of modern hang gliding.

A half-day public holiday is also observed for the Grafton Cup horse race, held each year on the second Thursday in July. It is the high point of the city's annual Racing Carnival—Australia's largest and richest non-metropolitan Carnival—which takes place over a fortnight in that month.

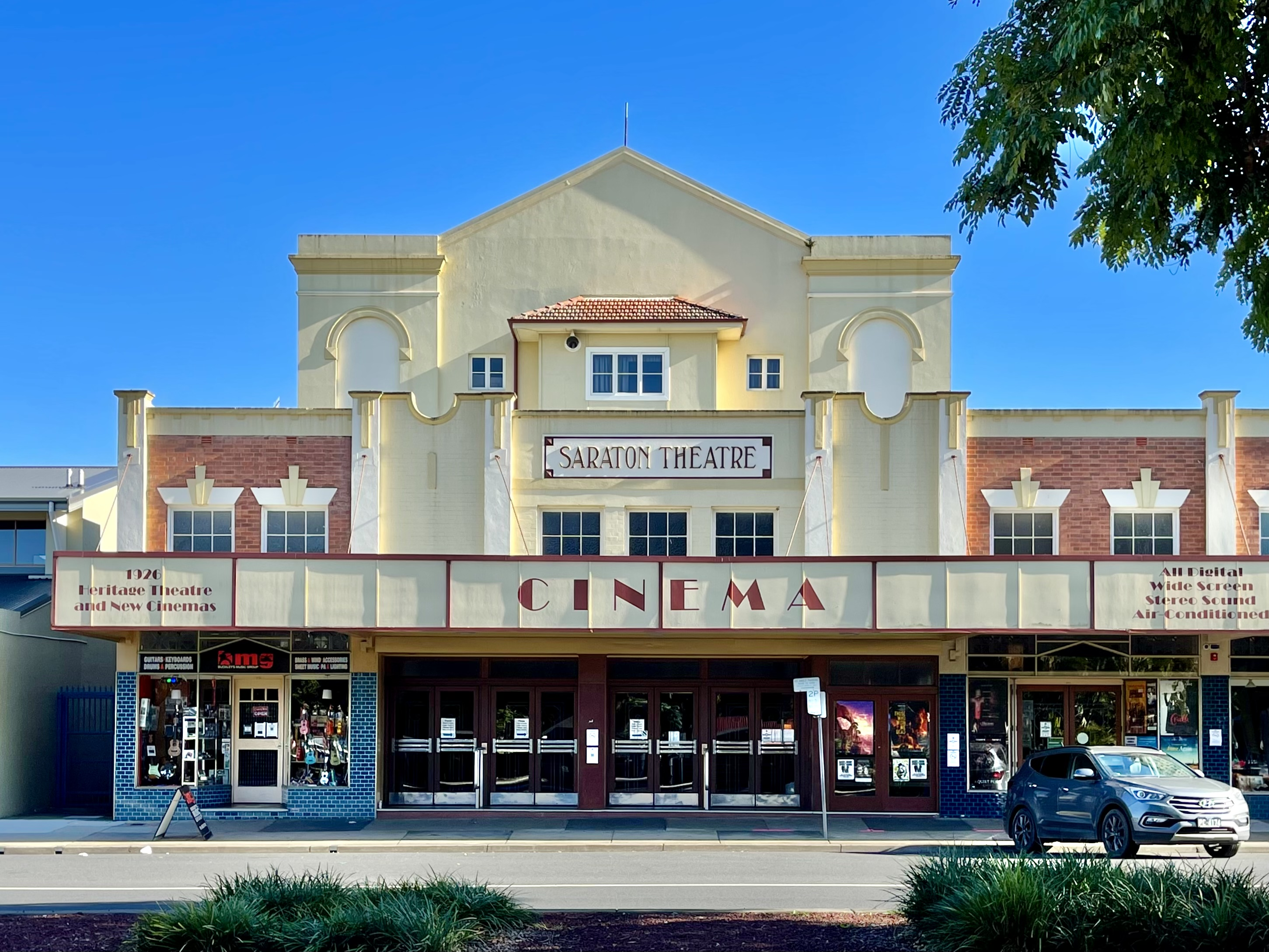
Saraton Theatre

Grafton is the birthplace of several renowned country music players. Local artist Troy Cassar-Daley received four Golden Guitar awards at the 2006 Tamworth Country Music Awards—the largest and most prestigious country music awards in Australia. At the same event Samantha McClymont, the 2005/2006 Grafton Jacaranda Queen and sister of Brooke McClymont, also received an award for her country music talent.

A vision of Grafton with its numerous brilliantly flowered trees in bloom is immortalised in Australian popular music in Cold Chisel's song Flame Trees, written by band member Don Walker, who had lived in Grafton during his formative years.

== Sports ==
The most popular sport in Grafton is Rugby league. There are two clubs from Grafton in the Group 2 Rugby League competition; the Grafton Ghosts and their arch-rival South Grafton Rebels. The two clubs each have a rich history, and derbies between the clubs have been known to draw attendances in excess of 3000 people.

Other sports such as soccer, Rugby union, Australian rules and field hockey are also played in Grafton.

== Notable buildings ==
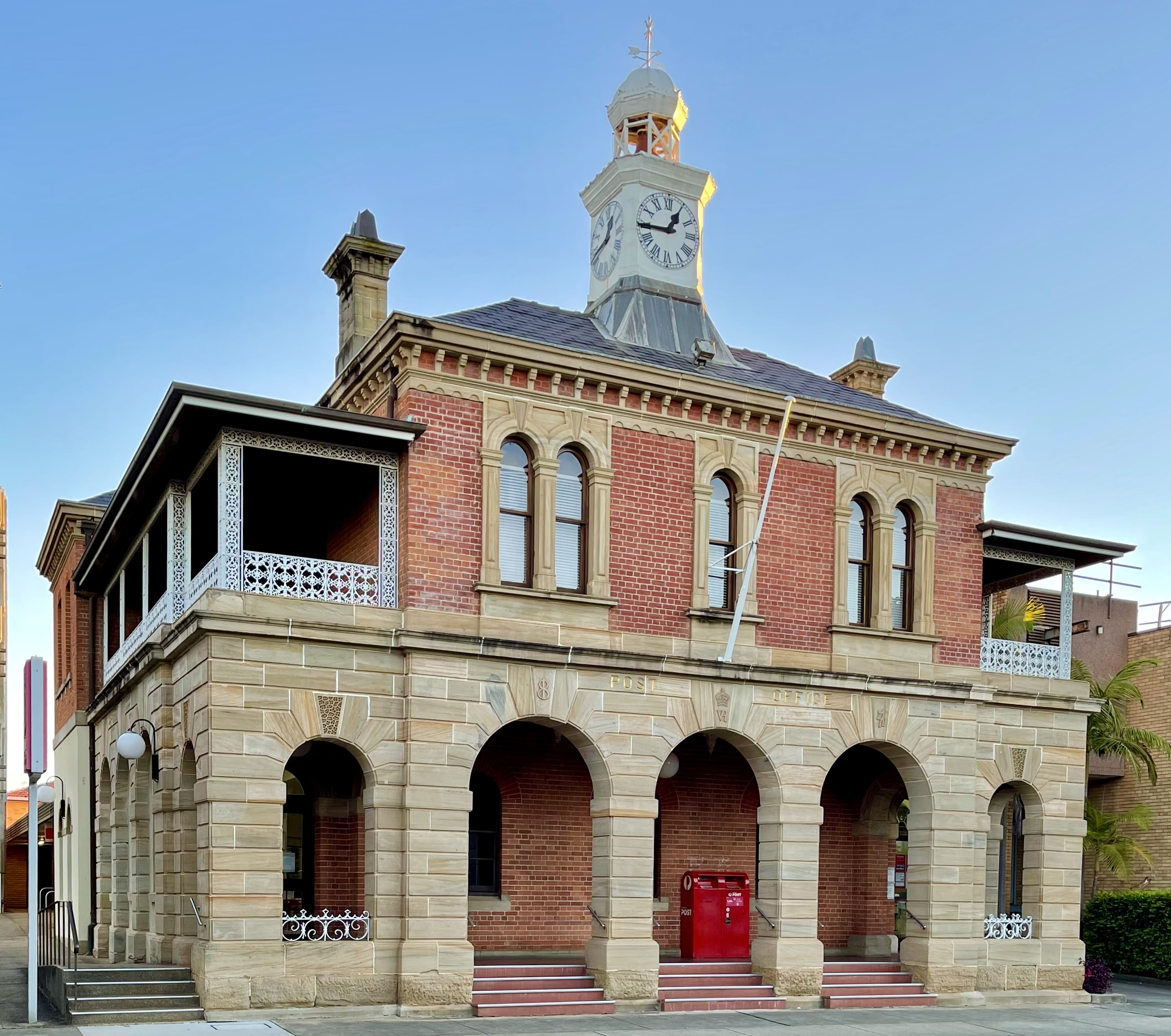
Grafton Post Office

Christ Church Cathedral, designed by John Horbury Hunt, was consecrated in 1884 and is the seat of the Anglican Diocese of Grafton.

Schaeffer House is a historic 1900 Federation house and contains the collection of the Clarence River Historical Society, which was formed in 1931.

== Transportation ==
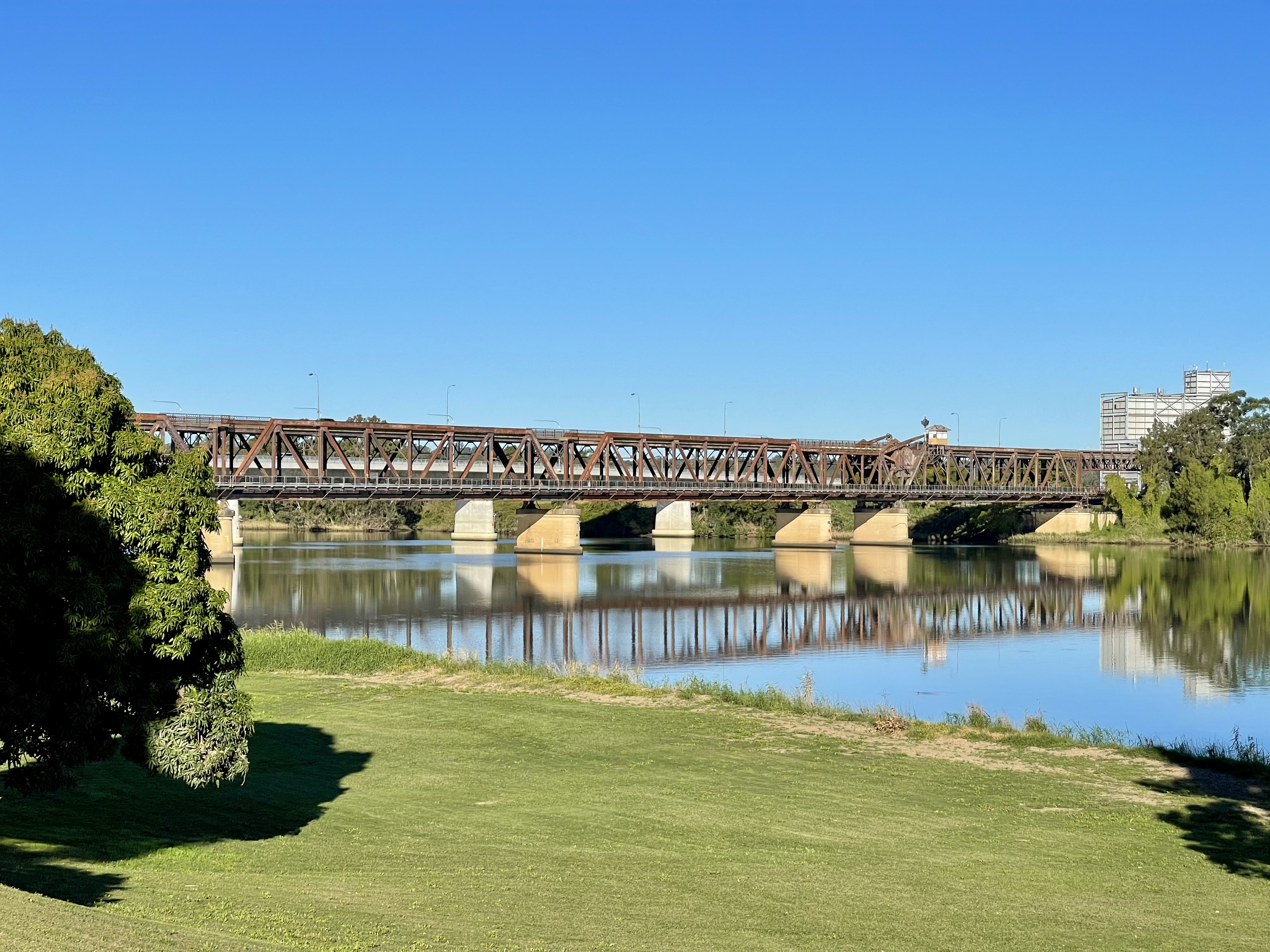
Grafton Bridge across the Clarence River

The Murwillumbah railway line was extended to Grafton in 1905; The North Coast Line reached South Grafton's railway station from Sydney in 1915. Pending the opening of the combined road and rail Grafton Bridge in 1932, Grafton had a train ferry to connect the two railways. Clarence Valley Regional Airport is the airport that services Grafton.

Until bypassed in May 2020, the Pacific Highway passed through Grafton and linked it to the Gwydir Highway.

Busways is the operator for local routes, as well as out-of-town routes to Junction Hill, Jackadgery/Cangai, Copmanhurst, and Maclean and Yamba.

Lawrence Bus Service operates a shopper service, as well as school service on school days, to and from Lawrence.

Northern Rivers Buslines operates a weekday service to Lismore via Maclean, Evans Head and Coraki.

NSW TrainLink operates a coach service to Byron Bay, connecting off the train from Sydney. It also offers a coach service to Moree via Glen Innes, connecting from the train from Brisbane.

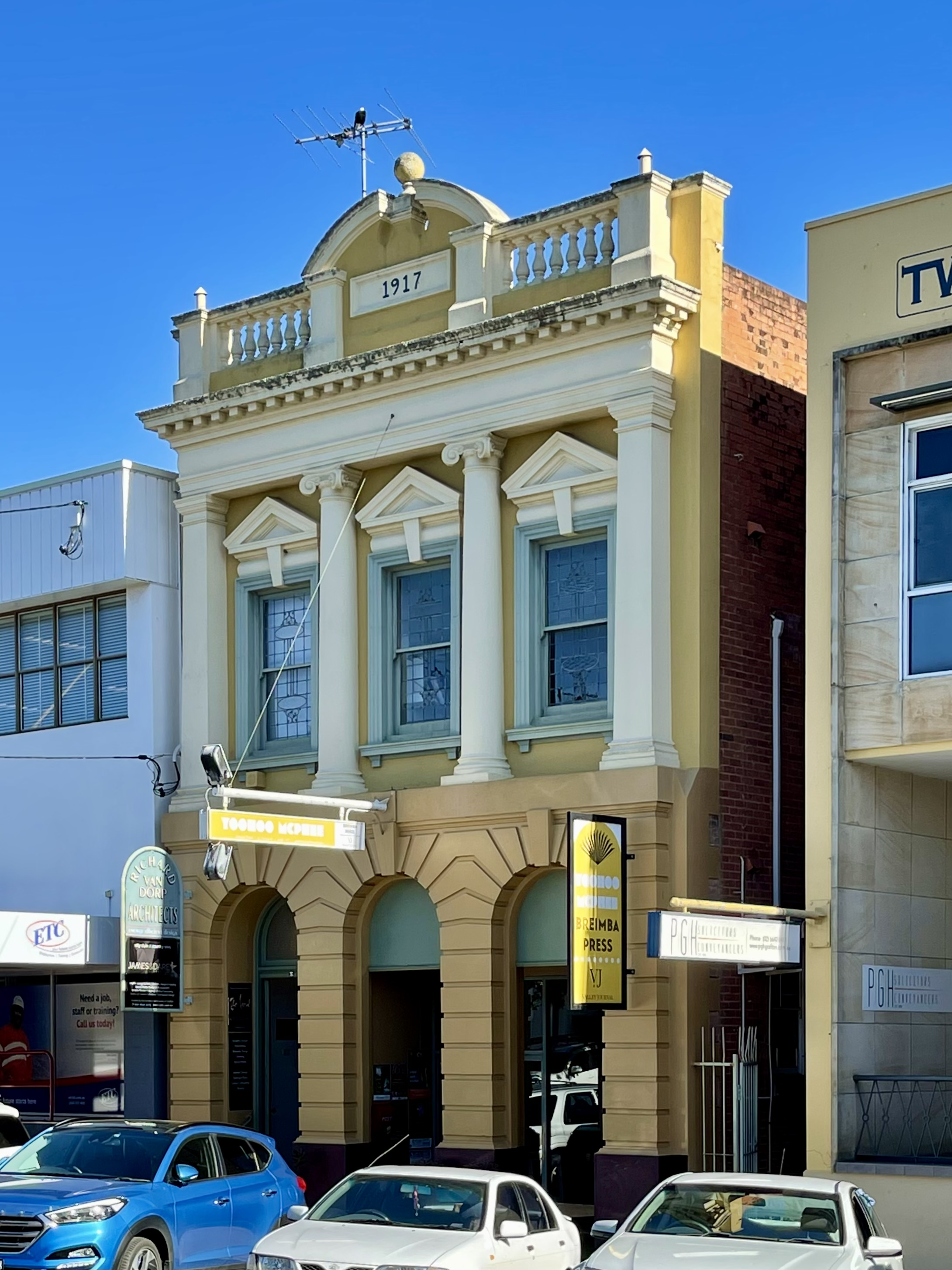
Various former and current commercial/retail buildings line Prince Street

== Industry ==
From 1904 to 1917 the Grafton Copper Mining Company operated a copper mine, smelter and tramway at Cangai, more than 100 km from Grafton via the Clarence and Mann rivers, today about 70 km over the Gwydir Highway. From 1952 to 1997, first as an independent company, then owned by Tooheys since 1961, the Grafton brewery provided Grafton Bitter to the North Coast. The nearby Harwood Mill is the oldest working sugar mill in New South Wales.

== Newspapers ==
The daily online-only newspaper of Grafton is The Daily Examiner, owned by News Corp Australia.

== Radio and television ==
=== Radio stations ===
- 2GF 89.5 FM (commercial)
- FM 104.7 (commercial)
- Triple J 91.5 FM/96.1 FM
- ABC Northern Rivers 738 AM/94.5 FM
- ABC Classic 97.9 FM/95.3 FM
- Radio National 99.5 FM/96.9 FM
- Sky Sports Radio Racing Radio 101.5 FM
- Loving Life FM 103.1 (community)
- Vision Christian Radio 1611 AM/88.0 FM

=== Television channels ===
- Seven (Formerly Prime7), 7HD, 7two HD, 7mate HD, 7Bravo, 7flix, TVSN, Racing.com, owned and operated station by the Seven Network.
- Nine (NBN Television); 9HD, 9Gem, 9Go!, 9Life, GOLD, affiliate of the Nine Network, owned by WIN Corporation.
- 10, 10HD, 10 Drama, 10 Comedy, News24 Regional, you.tv – (10 Northern NSW), owned and operated station by Network 10.
- ABC Television including ABC, ABC Family, ABC Entertains and ABC News, part of the Australian Broadcasting Corporation
- Special Broadcasting Service, SBS, SBS2, SBS Food, SBS World Movies and NITV

Pay television services are provided by Foxtel.

Of the three main networks, NBN produces an evening news bulletin containing regional news, screening every weeknight at 5:30pm on Channel 9. Seven News produces a mid north coast news bulletin screening weeknights at 6:00pm. Network 10's 10 News produces news updates throughout the day, broadcast from the Hobart studios.

== Education ==
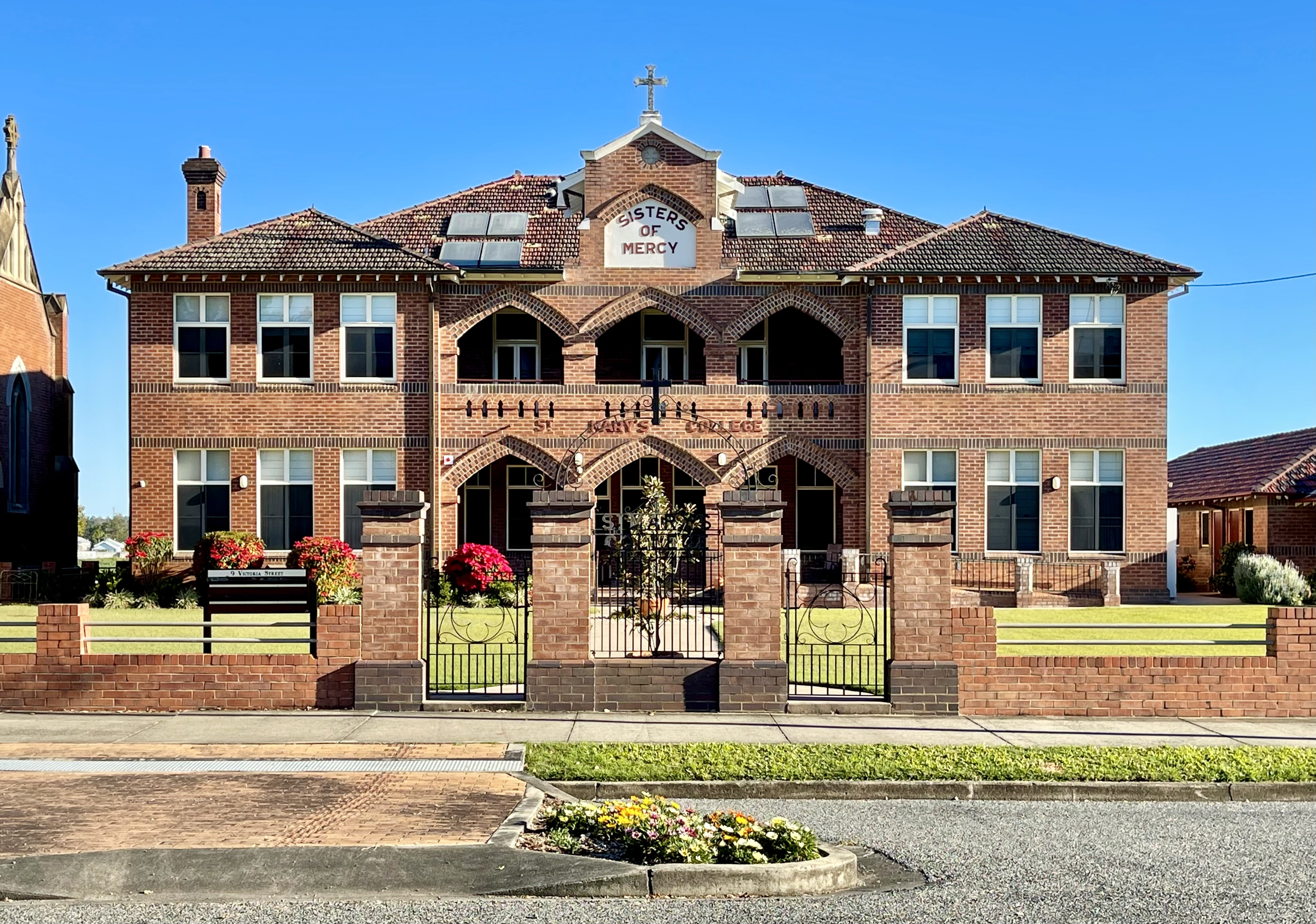
Former St Mary's College

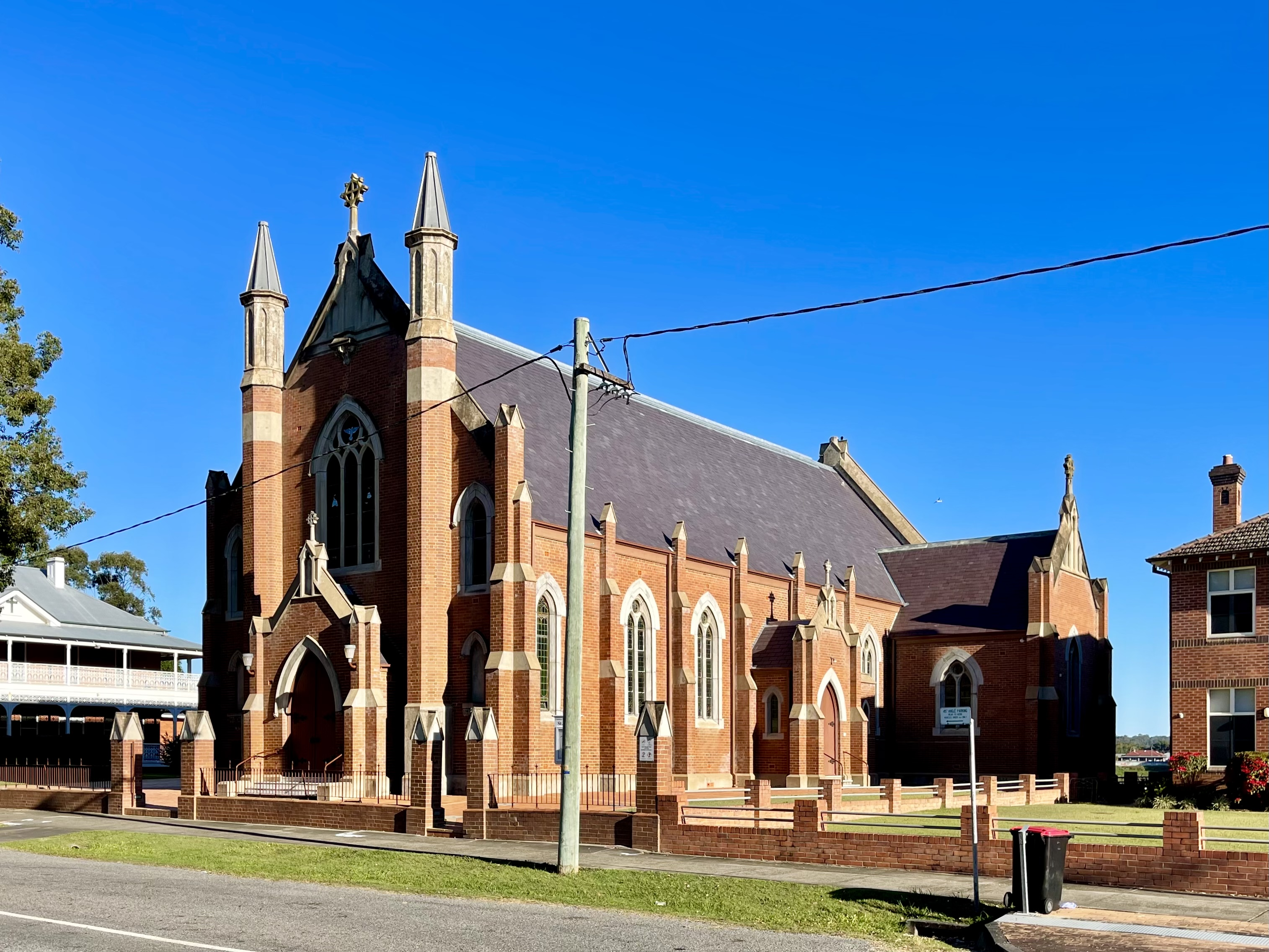
St Mary's College cathedral

=== Public schools ===
- Copmanhurst Public School
- Gillwinga Public School
- Grafton High School
- Grafton Public School
- South Grafton High School
- South Grafton Public School
- Westlawn Public School

=== Independent schools ===
- Clarence Valley Anglican School (formerly The Cathedral School)
- McAuley Catholic College
- St. Joseph's Primary School
- St. Mary's Primary School
- St. Andrew's Christian School

=== Defunct public schools ===
A large number of small (mostly one-teacher) public schools existed in the Grafton and Clarence Valley areas in the past. These schools have included:

- Alumny Creek 1872–1969
- Angowrie 1895–1899
- Billys Creek 1946–1963
- Calliope 1890–1983
- Carr's Creek 1877–1964
- Clouds Creek 1943–1964
- Coalcroft 1875–1971 (originally known as Coaldale till 1912)
- Coldstream Lower 1873–1966
- Eatonsville 1881–1961
- Glenferneigh 1928–1967
- Kungala 1926–1977
- Lawrence Lower 1883–1955
- Mororo 1886–1939
- Palmers Channel 1869–1975 (originally known as Taloumbi till 1907)
- Seelands 1889–1967
- Shark Creek 1877–1927
- Smalls Forest 1885–1971
- South Arm 1871–1967
- Southgate 1867–1875
- Stockyard Creek 1882–1895
- Swan Creek 1870–1994
- Trenayr 1901–1970 (originally known as Milers Waterholes till 1912)
- Tullymorgan 1886–1971 (originally known as Cormicks Creek till 1911)
- Tyndale 1868–1975
- Ulgundah Island Aboriginal 1908–1951 (near Maclean)
- Woodford Leigh 1869–1956
- Woombah 1872–1953

== Military history ==
During World War II, Grafton was the location of RAAF No.6 Inland Aircraft Fuel Depot (IAFD), completed in 1942 and closed on 29 August 1944. Usually consisting of 4 tanks, 31 fuel depots were built across Australia for the storage and supply of aircraft fuel for the Royal Australian Air Force and the US Army Air Forces at a total cost of £900,000 ($1,800,000).

== Notable people ==
Notable people who were born or lived in Grafton include:

- James Armah (born 1976, moved to Grafton in 2016), professional dual Commonwealth champion boxer
- Michael Balk, actor and producer
- Zoe Buckman (born 1988), Olympic middle-distance runner
- Troy Cassar-Daley (born 1969), country musician
- Fanny Cohen (born 1887), headmistress
- Matthew Colless (born 1960) astronomer and director of the Research School of Astronomy and Astrophysics (RSAA) at the Australian National University (ANU). He was for nine years previously the director of the Australian Astronomical Observatory (AAO), Australia's national optical observatory.
- Peter Drysdale (born 1938), economist
- Adam Eckersley (born 1982), musician
- Henry Havelock Ellis (1859–1939), British writer, physician, pioneer sexologist and social reformer, held the position of assistant master and then acting headmaster at a local private grammar school during 1877–78.
- Nick Emmett (born 1982), rugby league player
- Jim Eggins (1898–1952), politician
- Gary Foley (born 1950), Aboriginal activist, academic, writer
- Charles Hercules Green (1919–1950), officer
- George Green (1883–unknown), rugby league player
- Ernest Henry (1904–1998), Olympic swimmer
- Henry Kendall (1839–1882)
- Andrew Landenberger (born 1966), Olympic sailor and medalist
- Robyn Lambley (born 1965), politician
- Carly Leeson (born 1998), cricketer
- Jimmy Lisle (1939–2003), rugby league and rugby union player
- Brent Livermore (born 1976), field hockey midfielder
- Ryan Maskelyne (born 1999), Olympic swimmer, competing for Papua New Guinea
- The McClymonts, country music group consisting of sisters Brooke, Samantha and Mollie
- Frank McGuren (1909–1990), politician
- Iven Giffard Mackay (1882–1966), Lieutenant General
- David Marchant AM (born 1954), railway industry executive
- Bill McLennan (born 1942), statistician
- Chris Masters (born 1948), journalist
- Gillian Mears (born 1964), author
- James Lionel Michael, poet and solicitor (moved to Grafton 1861, died in Grafton 1868)
- Tony Mundine (born 1951), boxer
- Warren Mundine (born 1956), politician
- Kevin Nichols (born 1955), track cyclist
- Sir Earle Page (1880–1961), 11th Prime Minister of Australia, 1939
- Geoff Page (born 1940) poet
- Ruby Payne-Scott (1912–1981), pioneer in radiophysics and radio astronomy
- Frank Partridge (1924–1964), recipient of the Victoria Cross
- Cameron Pilley (born 1982), squash player
- Bessie Pocock RRC (1863–1946), was welcomed back after WWI with a teaset and timepiece
- Eddie Purkiss (born 1934), rugby union player
- Tyrone Roberts (born 1991), Newcastle Knights and Gold Coast Titans footballer
- Michael Rush (1844–1921), rower
- Lindsay Gordon Scott (1898–1941), architect
- Henry Ernest Searle (1866–1889), rower
- Sir Grafton Elliot Smith (1871–1937), anatomist and palaeoanthropologist
- Tse Tsan-tai (1872–1938), Chinese revolutionary, co-founder of the South China Morning Post
- James Tully (1877–1962), politician
- William Edward Vincent (1823–1861), founded The Daily Examiner
- Brenda Walker (1957–2024), writer
- Don Walker (born 1951), musician
- Arthur Bache Walkom (1889–1976), palaeobotanist and museum director
- Kenneth "Ken" Weeks (born 1913), supercentenarian, oldest living Australian
- Bill Weiley (1901–1989), politician
- Edith Alexandra White, (1901–1988) WW2 matron
- Danny Wicks (born 1985), rugby league player
- Graham Wilson, rugby league footballer of the 1960s
- Walter George Woolnough (1876–1958), geologist
- Beau Young (born 1974), singer-songwriter, surfer
