= Arcola, Grafton =

Arcola
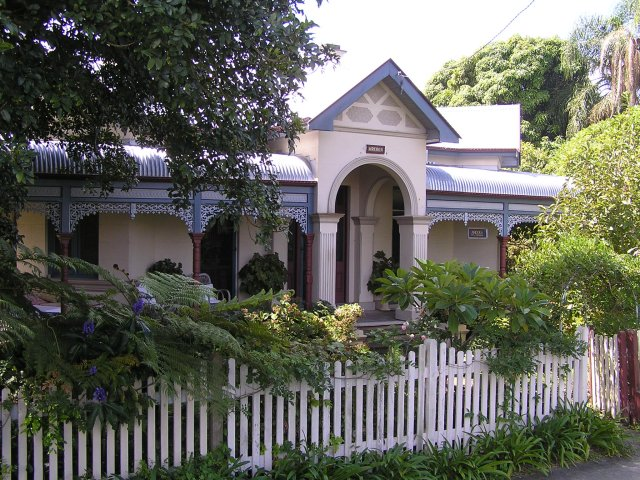

- Location within New South Wales Location within Australia
- 29.6880°S 152.9265°E
- Location: 150 Victoria Street, Grafton, Clarence Valley Council, New South Wales, Australia

History
- Built: 1907–1907

Site notes
- Owner: Arcola

New South Wales Heritage Register
- Official name: Arcola - house, stables, garden, fence
- Type: state heritage (complex / group)
- Designated: 2 April 1999
- Reference no.: 714
- Type: House
- Category: Residential buildings (private)

Arcola is a heritage-listed former residence and now bed and breakfast at 150 Victoria Street, Grafton, in the Northern Rivers region of New South Wales, Australia. It was built in 1907. It was added to the New South Wales State Heritage Register on 2 April 1999.

== History ==
Early survey and layout of Grafton

Governor Darling directed all Government surveyors to classify towns into 4 types; Sydney, seaports, towns at the head of navigable waters and inland towns. Grafton fitted type 3, and was laid out between 1847-9 by William Wedge Drake in 200 m square blocks on a N/W/S/E grid, over the existing settlement based on a private entrepreneurial establishment. Land grants accelerated from 1857 onwards. The early survey accounts for characteristics that influence the development and urban consolidation of Grafton today, including block size, deep allotments, wide streets and large verges allowing for substantial tree planting, grid layout, with street corners that intersect with the counter curved river banks. Arcola is a rare record of an original subdivision, the site on a typical river junction corner having no dominant street frontage but with the house addressing three frontages.

Arcola's development

Robert Roland Smith a wealthy grazier who owned considerable property in the Coaldale and Glenagle district, builder and architect to design it and H. F. Sault to build it, in 1907. Local press described it as one of the best and most imposing private residences in Grafton. Smith was a prominent citizen, busy in local organisations including the Clarence Pastoral & Agricultural Club and Jockey Club, a noted horseman and founding member of Grafton's Lancers. His wife's family were early settlers. Their daughter, Violet, lived there from 1918.

In 1918, a number of interior fittings were removed from the property. Sewerage was installed c. 1934, accessing the house from the north-east corner; also by then the rear north-east corner addition of toilet and cupboard was built. The cupboard section of the additions appears to be infill of the eastern end of the verandah. A portion of the yard rear to the stables was also fenced at this time. The house remained in the Smith family until bought by Mrs Wilkins in 1989.

In 1989-90, new wiring and plumbing was installed and the roof was repainted under the new owners, the Wilkins. In 1991, underpinning was installed to the existing footings to prevent subsidence. Mrs Wilkins was a foundation member of the Clarence Naturalists Club and created a magnificent garden. c. 1992, the outside toilet, the cactus plant which had covered most of it, and an adjacent tamarillo tree (Cyphomandra betacea) were all removed. A mandarin tree was severely pruned, a persimmon tree (Diospyros kaki) (mature) cut down, and a large 18-20m tall Bangalow palm (Archontophoenix cunninghamiana) had lost most of its healthy condition/at risk. The house exterior and some of the interior was painted in a non-approved/non-heritage colour scheme, timber Venetian blinds were removed from the front verandah, and a timber slat greenhouse/fern house which adjourned the rear verandah was removed. The contents of stables including chaff bins (very old, pine timber approx. 1.5m x 1m lined with a thin sheet of steel/tin, with the stamp of the Pitt Street, Sydney manufacturer on it) had been removed from the stables.

The Wilkins sold Arcola to Mr J. Arthur & Ms L. Bevege in 1997, who sold it to Mr & Mrs Coutts-Smith in 1999, who sold it to Ms R. Graves in 2002. Between 1995 and 2002, room 9 (the former maid's room) was altered to become a bathroom, with a new door opening made into it from room 5 (bedroom). The original external maid's room door (from rear verandah) was fitted to the new internal door space in 2002. The opening to the rear verandah was closed off using a door (fixed in position) that had been stored in the roof of the stables. Timber frame & sheet clad wall constructed inside external door. Bathroom fittings were rearranged and renewed. During this time, the external timber stairs to rear verandah were reconstructed with new stringer and timber square handrail (none existed before). In 2002, the roof sheeting and gutters were repaired, some downpipes replaced, copies of original gutters and finial ornaments (based on photos of originals) installed.

In summary

- House built 1907, designed by architects/builders Strauss brothers and built by HF Sault for original owner Robert Roland Smith.
- 1918 onwards, RR Smith's daughter Violet McLachlan, lived in the house, she being a foundation member of the Clarence Naturalist's Club, and creating a renowned garden.
- Date unknown: Alice Street & Victoria Street closed to traffic by construction of a flood levee to Clarence River, beside Arcola.
- 1989: Mr J. & Mrs M. Wilkins bought the property. Roof repainted, house rewired and plumbed (pers.comm., 1/1996)
- 1997: The Wilkins sold Arcola to Mr J. Arthur & Ms L. Bevege,
- 1999: the property was sold to Mr & Mrs Coutts-Smith
- 2002: the property was sold to Ms R. Graves.

== Description ==
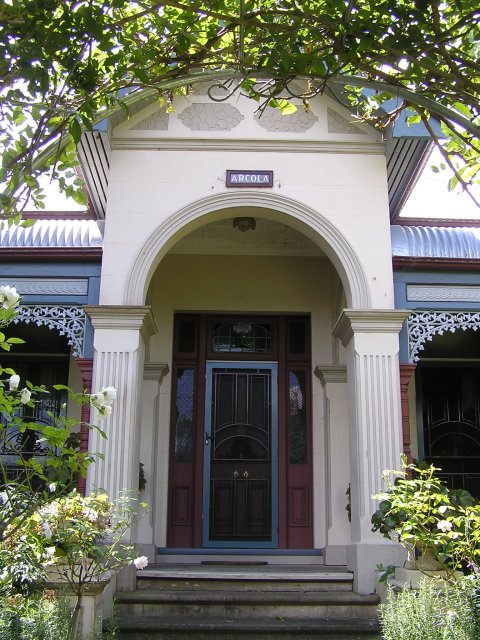
Entrance

Arcola is a 1907 single storey Queen Anne revival style house, with a garden including mango trees (Mangifera indica) and stables to rear, in a streetscape setting with wide grassy verges, trees and views over the Clarence River. The front fence to Victoria Street/Clarence River and part of side fence to Alice Street is picket, side fences (remainder) are corrugated iron.

The house is rendered brick with hipped iron roof, decorative corner gables and impressive central gabled entrance portico. A bull-nosed verandah is supported on turned timber posts with cast iron valances and original timber venetian blinds. The front door has etched glass panels and sidelights; the windows are double hung with stained and etched glass. Internal details are almost all original: etched glass, doorknobs, fireplaces and surrounds, doorbell, rails and dados, pressed metal ceilings, light fittings etc. The room layout is reasonably sophisticated, intended to divide the maid from the family by means of a segmented hallway. In spite of a somewhat narrow verandah the building successfully modifies the climate with ventilated eaves, external venetian blinds and an elevated floor.

Garden layout is generally original with some original plantings, Goodlett & Smith paving bricks and salt glazed edging tiles. Original timber picket fence to front. Mature trees on front corners of garden include a rosewood tree, and jacaranda (Jacaranda mimosifolia), and elsewhere mangoes (Mangifera indica), frangipani (Plumeria sp.) and a Bangalow palm (Archontophoenix cunninghamiana) tree.

There are brick stables to the rear of the house.

Significant elements include:

- house and internal layout plan;
- external and internal decorative elements and materials;
- design and position of front and side fencing;
- large, formal garden, major trees including mango trees (Mangifera indica) and their relationship to the house and stables;
- original stables outbuilding and inground well;
- streetscape setting of wide grassy verges, magnificent c.1880 street trees, complementary timber residences facing and views over the Clarence River.

=== Condition ===
A May 1999 pre-purchase inspection report raised a number of minor issues about the condition of the property. In July 1999 cracking of brick walls in the stables was noted due to drainage/groundwater collection, with repairs subsequently undertaken. In 2005, significant cracking was reported in both structural and non-structural components of the original section of the house in various locations.

== Heritage listing ==
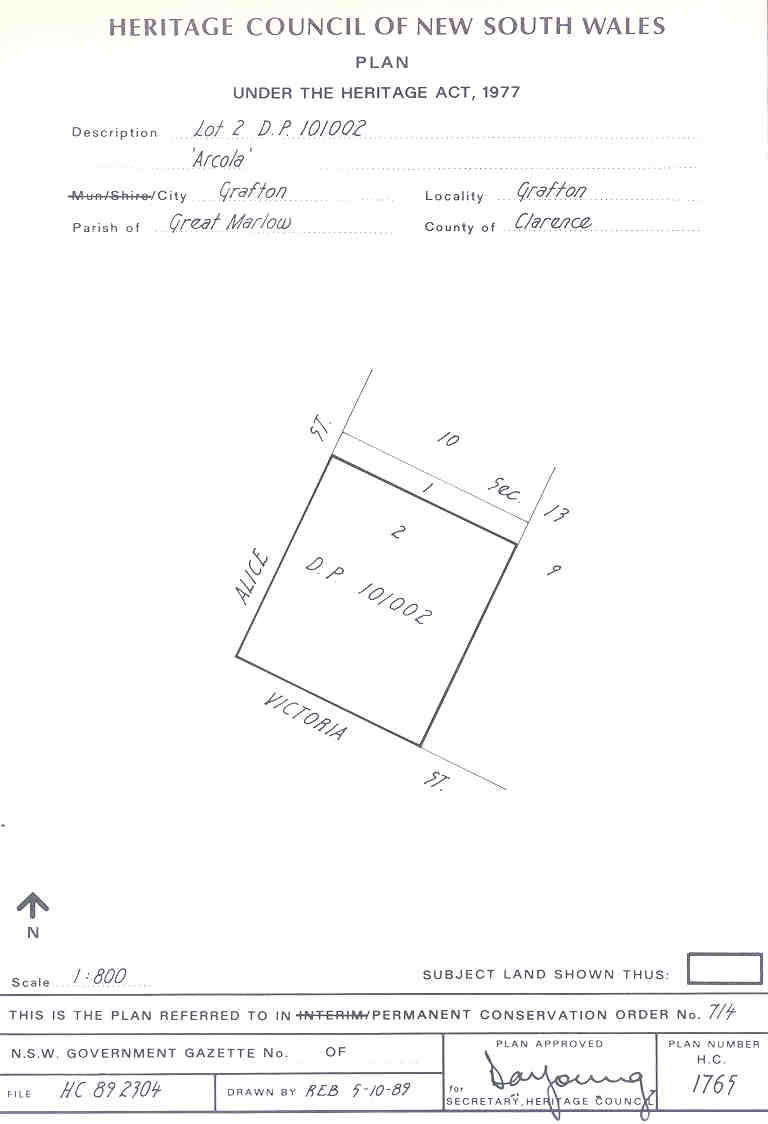
Heritage boundaries

Arcola has historic significance:

- at regional level as an excellent example of the type of residence with large garden and outbuildings built by the prosperous middle class in Grafton in 1907. The house and garden have a high degree of integrity and a well documented record of the interiors, fittings and furniture dating from 1918;
- at state level due to the setting overlooking the Clarence River, the streetscape with magnificent street trees planted c.1880s, and the house, outbuildings and garden of Arcola provide an outstanding record, which is largely untouched, of the pioneering city of Grafton in its heyday. It is a rare record of an original subdivision dating from the early colonial military town planning design for Grafton laid out by Surveyor on principles established by Governor Ralph Darling (1825–31) for all new towns in the colony;
- as an excellent example of wealthy middle class domestic living in Grafton in the early part of the 20th century;
- at local level for its association with the Strauss brothers and Sault the builders and designers of the house, who conducted business in Grafton from the late 1870s to the late 1930s;
- at local level for its association with Mrs Violet McLachlan who lived in the house from 1918-1989, during which time the early interior decoration and furnishings at 1918 remained intact. The photographic record and remnant samples of the fittings provide a rare record of a fully documented 1918 interior.

Arcola has social significance as it is held in high esteem by the Grafton community as a fine example of a federation house in a garden setting positioned in a pleasant street on the Clarence River;

Arcola has aesthetic significance:

- at a regional level as a beautiful example of Queen Anne revival style house, garden and outbuildings in tropical Australia;
- at a state level as the only known example of a property in Grafton which has a combination of Queen Anne revival style with strong Queensland Federation influence displayed in both the architectural and landscape design;
- as an excellent example and a complete record of the principles and philosophy associated with Queen Anne revival architecture and formal garden design in tropical rural Australia;

Arcola has scientific significance as:

- it provides an excellent example and a complete record of the principles and philosophy associated with Queen Anne revival architecture (in exterior and interior details, building techniques, craftsmanship and materials especially timber cut from very old first growth trees in the Clarence area) and formal garden design (laid out along the formal geometric lines made famous by André Le Nôtre and promoted by Australian architect W. R. Butler and others including garden designer Michael Guilfoyle, Charles Bogue Luffman and English garden designer William Robinson) in tropical rural Australia.

Significant elements include:

- house and internal layout plan;
- external and internal decorative elements and materials;
- design and position of front and side fencing;
- large, formal garden, major trees including mango trees (Mangifera indica) and their relationship to the house and stables;
- original stables outbuilding and inground well;
- streetscape setting of wide grassy verges, magnificent c.1880 street trees, complementary timber residences facing and views over the Clarence River.

Arcola is also significant for its contribution to a group of spacious timber buildings in Victoria Street (the Grafton Conservation Area) recognised by the National Trust of Australia (NSW) as significant.

Arcola was listed on the New South Wales State Heritage Register on 2 April 1999.
