= The Daily Examiner =

Newspaper in Grafton, New South Wales

- Type: Newspaper
- Format: Tabloid
- Owner(s): News Corp
- Editor: Bill North
- Founded: 1859
- Language: English
- Headquarters: Grafton, New South Wales, Australia; 55 Fitzroy St
- Circulation: 5,571 Monday–Friday; 6,446 Saturday
- Website: dailyexaminer.com.au

The Daily Examiner is a daily newspaper serving Grafton, New South Wales, Australia. The newspaper is owned by News Corp Australia. At various times the newspaper was known as The Clarence and Richmond Examiner and New England Advertiser (1859–1889) and Clarence and Richmond Examiner (1889–1915).

The Daily Examiner is circulated to Grafton, the Clarence Valley and surrounding areas from Woody Head in the north to Red Rock in the south.

The circulation of The Daily Examiner is 5,571 Monday to Friday and 6,446 on Saturday.

A major redesign of The Daily Examiner was highly commended in the PANPA 2002 Newspaper of the Year Awards for dailies and Sundays up to 20,000. The Daily Examiner was also awarded PANPA Newspaper of the Year 0 to 20,000 copies in 2009 for Australia, New Zealand and the Pacific and 2010 APN Newspaper of the year

The Daily Examiner website is part of the APN Regional News Network.

== History ==
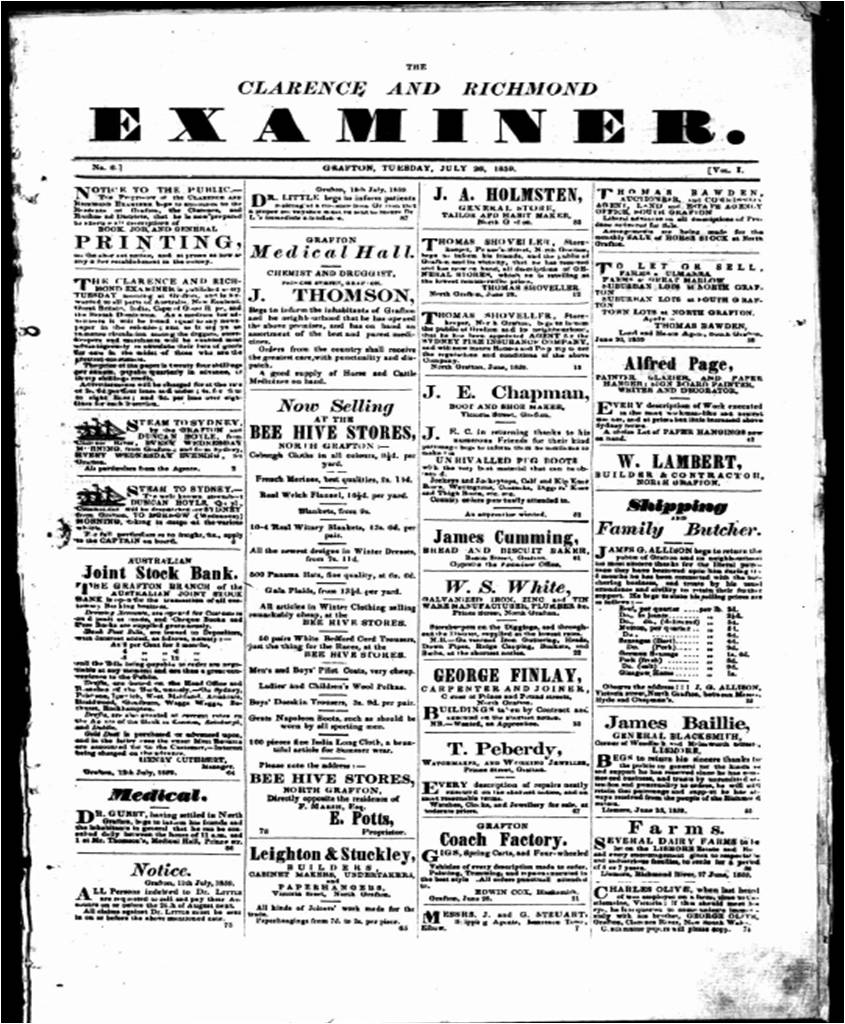
Clarence & Richmond Examiner title page, 26 July 1859

The Clarence and Richmond Examiner was ostensibly launched in 1859 by William Edward Vincent. However, the power behind the throne was wealthy politician Clark Irving, an opponent of the separation of the Northern Rivers from the colony of New South Wales. In 1861 it was purchased by Richard Stevenson for £600. In 1875 it was purchased by James Gray and James McNaughton.

Grafton generally had three or more newspapers from 1874 into the new century when the tri-weekly Clarence and Richmond Examiner was converted into a daily on 1 July 1915, "to keep public issues constantly before the minds of the people".

Grafton has had a succession of long-serving editors who won renown for their editorial leadership in community affairs, most notably Cecil Bush Bailey (1886–1944), William Bailey-Tart (1944–1960) and John Irvine Moorhead (1960–1977).

Grafton surgeon Earle Page, later a caretaker Prime Minister, was a major boardroom influence on The Examiner as it continued to champion the New England New State proposal, a hydro-electric scheme on the Nymboida River, and a deep-sea port plan for Iluka.

Editors who have had the stewardship of the paper in the era of modern technological advancement include Geoff Orchison, Robert Milne and Peter Ellem, who has campaigned for a second Grafton bridge crossing, an ambulance station/health clinic in Yamba, and improvements to the Pacific Highway.

The Examiner continued its groundbreaking role in 1981, by appointing Lauretta Godbee as the first female editor of an Australian daily newspaper. The current editor is Bill North.

Along with many other regional Australian newspapers owned by NewsCorp, the newspaper ceased print editions in June 2020 and became online-only publication.

== Digitisation ==
The various versions of the paper have been digitised as part of the Australian Newspapers Digitisation Program project hosted by the National Library of Australia.

== See also ==
- List of newspapers in Australia
- List of newspapers in New South Wales
