= William Vincent (printer) =

William Edward Vincent (17 September 1823 – 22 November 1861) was a New Zealand printer, publisher and publican. He was born in Kingston upon Hull, Yorkshire, England in 1823. His father was gold and silversmith, Thomas Vincent of Holborn, Middlesex. His mother, Anna Muddle Canney, was from Deal, Kent. He was one of five siblings, most notably the second younger brother of Henry "the Chartist" Vincent, William was baptised almost six years after his birth, at Holy Trinity, in Hull, Yorkshire.

William voyaged on the ship The Slains Castle (a New Zealand Company ship) from Deal, England on 18 September 1840 and he arrived in Wellington in January 1841. William was just 17-years-old when he emigrated.

William became involved in various early Wellington newspapers. By 1843, William had established himself and appeared in the Burgess Roll of Wellington, which was a list noting the "Who's who of Wellington".

William and his family moved to Sydney in New South Wales in 1853, where he worked for The Sydney Morning Herald. In June 1859, he established the Clarence and Richmond Examiner in Grafton in northern New South Wales. He died in Grafton on 22 November 1861.
