= Arcola, West Virginia =

Unincorporated community in West Virginia, United States

Arcola
- Unincorporated community
- Location within the state of West Virginia Arcola (the United States)
- Coordinates: 38°28′0″N 80°31′9″W
- Country: United States
- State: West Virginia
- County: Webster
- Elevation: 1,873 ft (571 m)
- Time zone: UTC-5 (Eastern (EST))
  - Summer (DST): UTC-4 (EDT)
- GNIS ID: 1550113

Arcola is an unincorporated community and coal town in Webster County, West Virginia, United States.

The name Arcola ("our coal") was selected by coal mining officials.
