= Arcola, Georgia =

Unincorporated community in Georgia, U.S.

Coordinates: 32°20′37″N 81°36′07″W

Arcola is an unincorporated community in Bulloch County, in the U.S. state of Georgia.

== History ==
In 1900, the community had 50 inhabitants.
