= Ulgundahi Island =

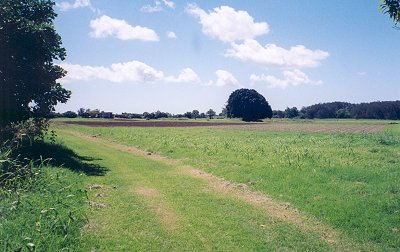
- Farmland on Ulgundahi Island

- Location within New South Wales Location within Australia
- 29.4341°S 153.2125°E
- Location: Clarence River by North Arm, Maclean, Clarence Valley Council, New South Wales, Australia

History
- Built: 1904–2003

Site notes
- Owner: Yaegl Local Aboriginal Land Council

New South Wales Heritage Register
- Official name: Ulgundahi Island
- Type: state heritage (landscape)
- Designated: 24 December 2004
- Reference no.: 1721
- Type: Historic site
- Category: Aboriginal

Ulgundahi Island is a heritage-listed Aboriginal site, formerly an occupational settlement, with ongoing usage as farmland and as a site of ongoing significance, at Clarence River by North Arm, Maclean, Clarence Valley Council, New South Wales, Australia. The property is owned by the Yaegl Local Aboriginal Land Council. It was added to the New South Wales State Heritage Register on 24 December 2004.

== History ==
Ulgundahi Island has been a site of occupation since 1880 when many Aboriginal people retreated to the island when Europeans had introduced diseases and the land had been taken up by European farms.

In 1904, a portion of Ulgundahi Island was gazetted as an Aboriginal reserve under the control of the Aboriginal Protection Board (APB) and in 1907 the whole of the island was included in the Reserve. The name Ulgundahi Island, is to have come from a Yaegl word meaning "shape of an ear". Several families already resided on the island and it was reported in 1904 that eight acres be set aside for a Reserve and that supplies of roofing iron and tanks should be delivered immediately. Concerns by European residents had been expressed about Aboriginal camps on the fringes of nearby townships and in 1908 the APB relocated families from Ashby onto Ulgundahi Island increasing the resident population to 60. In 1909, Aboriginal people from Harwood Island fled to Ulgundahi Island due to a European farmer burning down the camp of more than 40 bark dwellings.

The basis of settlement at the island was farming, each head of a family having an average of about three to four acres, while child endowment of 5/weekly was paid in respect of each child under the required age, and there was a scale of rations to the extent of 10/ weekly for those who need it, with two outfits of clothing and a blanket yearly for each person. The allocation of 3–4 acres to each family to cultivate for maize, cane and vegetables, no doubt to encourage industry any surplus produce could be sold.

Rations were supplied for children but not to adults as a rule. For any adult that wasn't able to earn sufficient, the following weekly ration was provided with a half a ration for each child: – Flour, 8 lbs; sugar, 2 lbs; jam 4oz; dripping, 8oz; potatoes, 2 lbs; onions, 8ozs; baking powder, 4ozs.

The APB provided clothes which were all the same, black trousers and blue shirts for boys and purple dresses for the girls and no shoes. Medicine was given by the Manager, regardless if it was needed or wanted, quinine, caster oil, cod liver oil and kerosine were some things given regularly.

In 1908, the APB appointed a European manager who was also to be the school teacher to Ulgundahi Island, who resided at Ashby and attended the island each day by boat. In the same year the Aboriginal Provisional School was established on the Island and other buildings included a building, outhouses and a tank. A number of children from the island attended the Maclean School and it was said that parents of European children attending the school objected to the Aboriginal children from Ulgundahi being allowed to go to the same school. There was very little taught to the children of the island.

In 1910 a small church was built by the residents of the island. A report in January 1921 states that Mr John Cameron paid the balance of funds needed and furnished the church. Until 1910 the minister Rev. Scott Neil visited the island regularly to take services. His sister took Sunday School classes and became involved with the welfare of the women and children. Other denominations became involved from time to time, especially the Baptists, Free Presbyterians and Salvation Army. An organ was later provided which was played by Mrs Blakeney.

The families were not compelled to remain on the island by the authorities, though with a hostile European society and the power of the manager to allocate an absent family residence to others, these were enough reasons as to what influenced people to remain on the island. There was conflict between isolation and assimilation as the children were trained only for employment for the white community as farm labourers for the boys or in domestic service for the girls.

Men would harvest the cane and take it to Harwood mill. Each home on the island had its own fruit – peaches, oranges, mangoes, passionfruit and grapes. Those who had vegetable gardens would pick and prepare them for the markets. Any money that was earned from the sales of either cane or vegetables all went back to the APB, never to the person who sold it. It was reported in 1911 by the APB that this goal had practically been achieved, with only one person in receipt of rations.

Continual flooding of the island, caused the state authorities to question the viability of the settlement. The 1921 flood a been a bad experience. Families were often left to fend for themselves for up to three months at a time. Further floods occurred in 1928 and several during the 1940–1950. In 1951 the government school was closed and children were required to go by boat to Maclean to attend school. In 1958 the APB manager retired, and was not replaced.

Yaegl families often moved to places off the island for holidays or camps lasting from one to two weeks to an entire summer. A popular destination was known as Murrayville, a tributary of the north arm of the Clarence River. Families would often camp for six weeks at a time, and were drawn to the abundance of "wild food" known as "cobra" or wood worms. Ashby was another camp used, especially during times of flooding of the island. Yamba was also a popular place for families to visit for the entire summer months to exploit the food resources of the coast and waters.

By 1961, the residential focus of Aboriginal families had shifted from Ulgundahi Island to Aboriginal reserves in Yamba and Maclean.

The Aboriginal families living on Ulgundahi Island were governed by the APB for approximately half a century, until the withdrawal of the APB towards the end of the 1950s. In 1956 the Hillcrest Aboriginal Reserve was created on land on the edge of Maclean, and several houses were built for families who wished to move. By 1962, the last Aboriginal families had left the island to take up residence at Hillcrest.

== Description ==
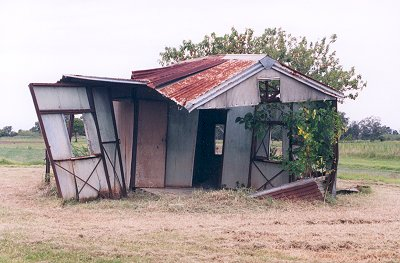
Surviving building built of corrugated iron

Located within the Clarence River, Ulgundahi Island is approximately 14.16 hectares in land size and approximately 1.5 km long. The western end of the island continues to change shape due to the silt build up. Cardy Craig and first wife Sarah Blakey were first Aborigine to own home/land in 1909. After Sarah died in 1927, Cardy remarried to Lena Khan. Since then Craig family have relocated south.

During the years of control by the APB, the Aboriginal people were allowed to farm crops of cane, corn and vegetables. Today, parts of the island are still being used by the local Aboriginal community for its farming purposes.

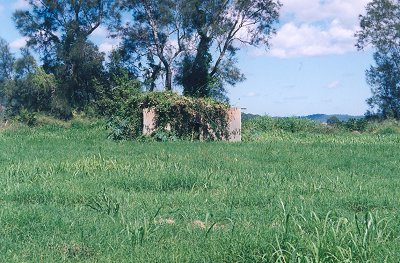
Overgrown structure

There are two remaining structures, though in poor state, one located in the northwest end of the island the other towards the southeast side. The main structure on the northwest side, is said to be the first house built on the Mission. The condition of the structure, is poor. Made of corrugated iron, it still retains the original flooring of timber and clear of being taken over by vines. The other structure, also built of corrugated iron does not appear to have a roof, though its walls are still standing. Its condition is poor and covered in vines.

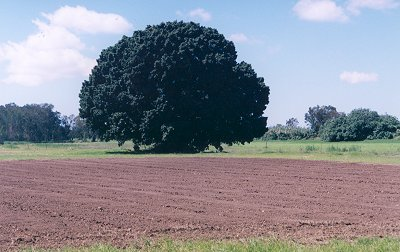
Fig tree

A new structure now stands on Ulgundahi Island, and acts as an undercover area. This allows school groups and members of the community to come and sit and Ulgundahi Island.

A symbolic item still remains on the island, that being the large fig tree which is located towards the Western end of the island. Fig trees have a special significance to the Yaegl community. It is said that fig trees hold spirits and must not be disturbed.

The island continues to be modified due to the continuation of farming. The community also have future plans to include interpretation and signage and undertake conservation works to the old houses.

== Heritage listing ==
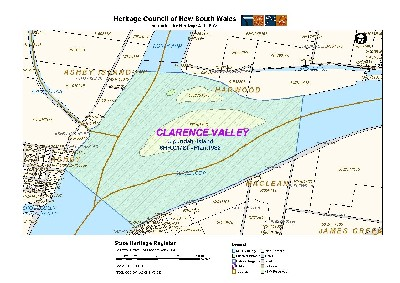
Heritage boundaries

Ulgundahi Island and its surrounding waters is highly significant to the cultural, social, spiritual and heritage values of the Yaegl people and other Aboriginal people who have a strong association with the island. Ulgundahi Island was gazetted as an Aboriginal Reserve in 1904 and became home to most of the local Aborigines living in camps scattered about the fringes of Maclean and Lower Clarence Region including Southgate, Ashby, Lawrence and Ulmarra. Being one of many Mission sites across NSW, its social significance relates to the associations with the Aboriginal Protection Board removing Aboriginal people from local towns and cities in an attempt to abolish all traces of Aboriginality. Today the island and its significance to the cultural and heritage values remains strong for the Yaegl people and other Aboriginal people who have an association with the island. The island continues to be utilised by the Yaegl community for uses such as educational tours and organic farming.

Ulgundahi Island was listed on the New South Wales State Heritage Register on 24 December 2004 having satisfied the following criteria.

The place is important in demonstrating the course, or pattern, of cultural or natural history in New South Wales.

Ulgundahi Island was gazetted as an Aboriginal Reserve in 1904 when Aboriginal families were moved to the island from settlements all over the Lower Clarence region including Southgate, Ashby, Lawrence and Ulmarra. By 1905 there were 21 people living on the island. The site is of state significance as it is able to demonstrate evidence of occupational living by these groups through the associations that still exist today with the Yaegl people of Maclean. Members of the Yaegl community and descendants of those of the original families placed on the island have a strong connection to the land and its surrounding waters.

The place has strong or special association with a particular community or cultural group in New South Wales for social, cultural or spiritual reasons.

Ulgundahi Island has a strong and special association for its social, cultural, heritage and spiritual values for the Yaegl people and other Aboriginal people of the lower Clarence region. The area is well known for its dreaming stories of the making of the Clarence River by the wicked old woman of the Creation period, Dirrangun. The island became a focal point for all the communities in the area: people were born, married and died in this place and every one of them is remembered by today's Aboriginal community.

For the Aboriginal people of today who have an association to the island, it holds a special place as a symbol of their changing place in history and their ability to not only survive all the injustices they suffered, but to come out of if stronger, and more aware of their culture and their place in the landscape of this region.

The place is important in demonstrating the principal characteristics of a class of cultural or natural places/environments in New South Wales.

Ulgundahi Island and the surrounding waters is highly significant to the Yaegl people and other Aboriginal people associated to the island to their cultural heritage values. The area is outstanding as it is able to demonstrate a particular way of life and custom of the Yaegl people and other Aboriginal people who lived on the island. Although there are no physical buildings remaining, except for the skeletal structure of the first house built on the island, and a smaller skeletal structure covered in vine, the connection to land and its spiritual and cultural values are held high within the community.
