= Harwood, New South Wales =

Harwood New South Wales
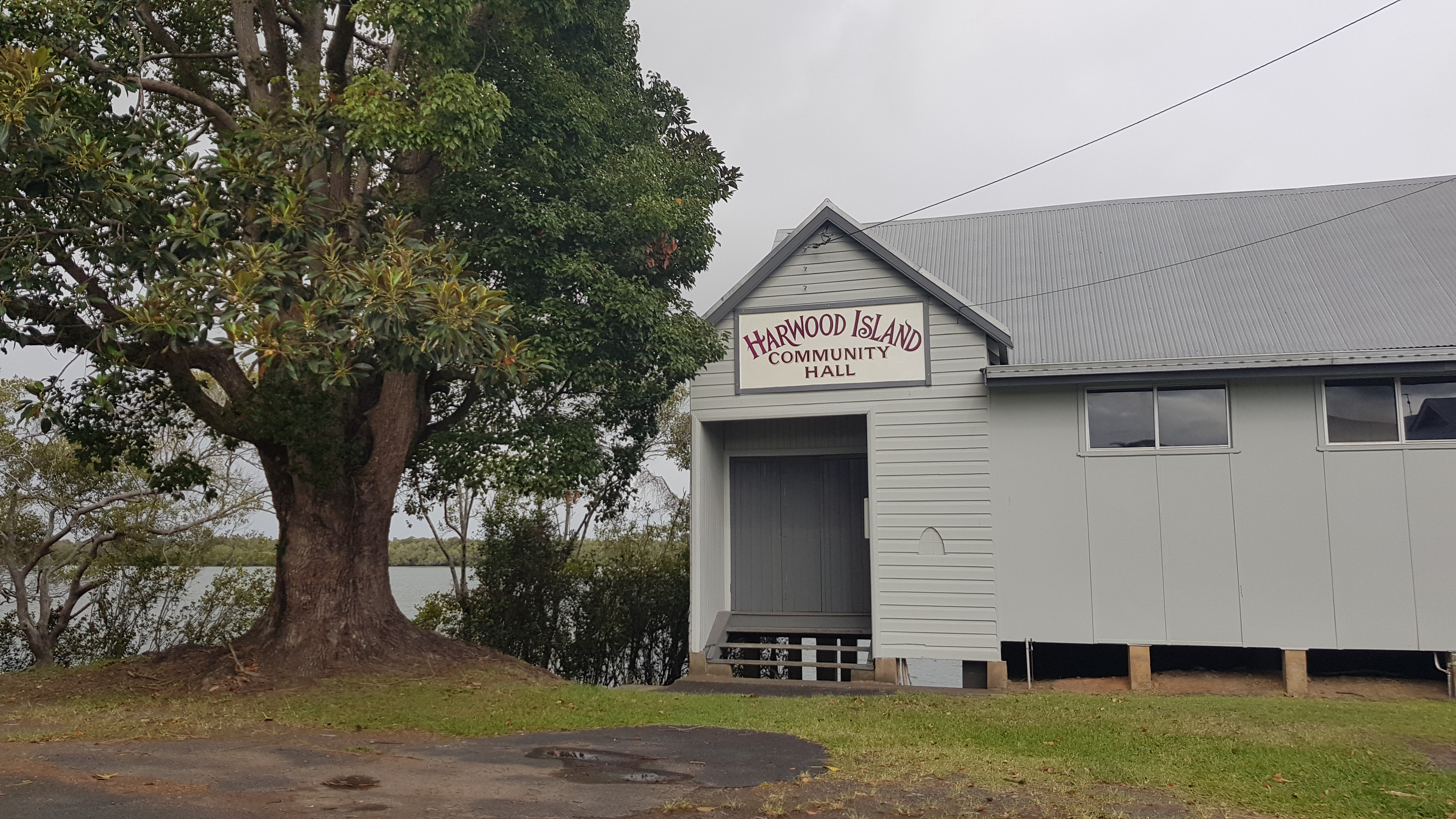
- Harwood Island Community Hall, 2023

- Coordinates: 29.4224°S 153.2458°E
- Population: 291 (2016 census)
- Established: 1850s
- Postcode(s): 2465
- Location: 652 km (405 mi) NNE of Sydney; 42 km (26 mi) NE of Grafton; 5 km (3 mi) NE of Maclean
- LGA(s): Clarence Valley Council
- State electorate(s): Clarence
- Federal division(s): Page

Harwood is a village on the Clarence River, 5 km north-east of Maclean in northern New South Wales. As of the 2016 census, Harwood had a population of 291. It is known for sugar cane production, with the Harwood Sugar Mill located on the eastern side of town.

== History ==
The traditional custodians of the Harwood area are the Yaegl people.

The first Europeans settled the area around the 1830s due to the abundance of cedar. Sugar cane production began in the 1850s, with the Harwood Mill opening in 1874.

== Roads ==
The Pacific Highway cuts through the middle of the village. Prior to the construction of the Harwood Bridge in 1966, the Harwood Ferry transported vehicles along the highway across the Clarence River. It was the last ferry on the highway. In 2019, a new bridge superseded the old one to carry the highway. The old bridge is still used for local traffic.

== Amenities ==
Harwood Island Public School is the local primary school. For high school, students have to travel to Maclean.

The village also has a general store, antique store, pub (with children's playground and multiple Tesla charging stations), hall, cricket oval, and public boat ramp.
