= Woodford Island =

Locality in New South Wales, Australia

Coordinates: 29°31′S 153°08′E

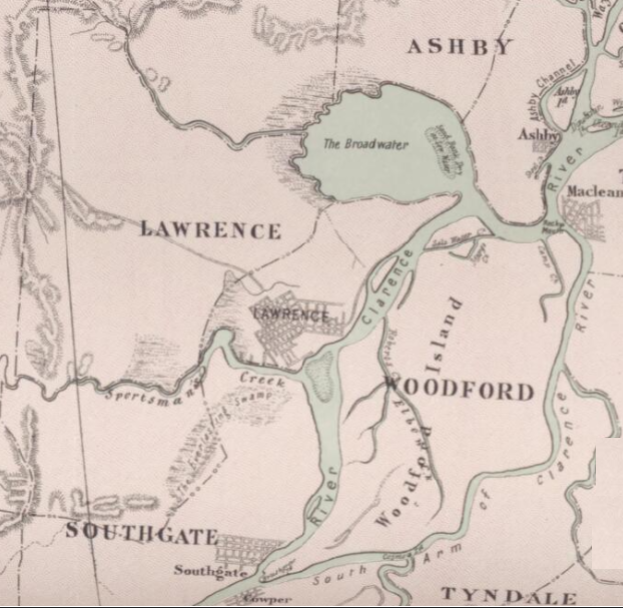
- Map of the Clarence River showing Woodford Island in 1886

- Location in New South Wales

Geography

Administration
- Australia
- state: New South Wales

Additional information
- Time zone: AEST (UTC+10)
  - Summer (DST): AEDT (UTC+11)

Woodford Island is the largest island in the lower reaches of the Clarence River in the Far-North Coast of New South Wales, Australia. It is formed by the Clarence River where it splits into the South Arm and North Arm at the small village of Brushgrove then reforms at the town of Maclean. The island is the largest in NSW, either inland or offshore, at 37 km^{2}.

== Access ==
There are three ways on and off the island, two bridges; at the southern end is the Wingfield Bridge in Brushgrove, which crosses to Cowper, and the McFarlane Bridge at the northern end, that gives access to Maclean.

There is a ferry that connects Lawrence to Woodford Dale, being the western side of the island.

== Economy ==
Woodford Island is mostly flood plain which supports the primary industries of sugar cane and milk producing cattle. A small fishing fleet plies the Clarence River. There are a few small businesses, however, most residents travel off the island to Maclean or Grafton for goods and services.

== People and geography ==
There are approximately 300 people living on the island. Through its almost exact centre is a mountain ridge. The rest is plains which are subjected to periodic flooding. The largest town is Brushgrove at the south of the island. It holds major aboriginal significance in the area and the aboriginal village of Ilarwill.

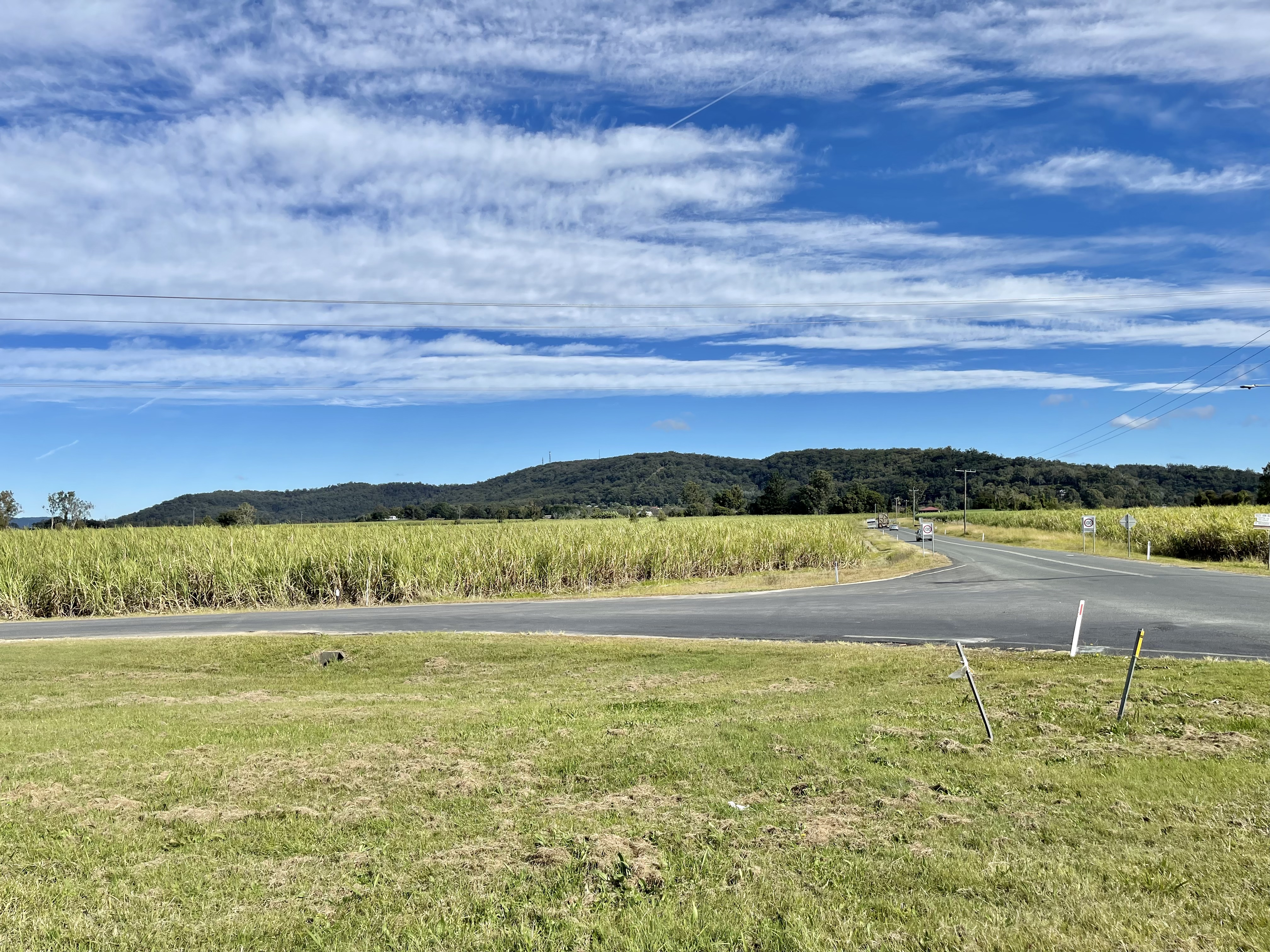
Woodford Island

== History ==
Woodford Island was one of the first places inhabited by Europeans on the Far-North Coast. Original settler John Small was attracted to the abundance of Australian Redcedar.

In 1838, some 20 Bandjalung people (original inhabitants of Woodford Island) were murdered by cedar getters in a reprisal massacre.

The town of Brushgrove was once a major trading hub for timber, sugar and other agriculture goods due to its location on the Clarence River. This brought tremendous wealth to area and at one time the island supported many schools, a police station, many businesses and other utilities. However, due to the development of road and train infrastructure, the town has dwindled in size over the past century.

== Points of interests ==
Tourist drive 22 travels across the island starting at the Lawrence Car Ferry and ending at the McFarlane Bridge that enters Maclean. The bridge was named after John McFarlane local member of the New South Wales Legislative Assembly.

The island is broken up into areas being- Woodford Dale (The last school on the island which closed in 2011) Woodford Leigh Brushgrove (Old, police station, post office, pub, shops) Ilarwill ( aboriginal village, old quarry boat shed) Tyndale South arm As well as many of property name like yakalo on the Lawrence side of the island

Maclean District Golf Course is on the island.

Hermitt Cave, Small's Pioneer Cemetery, Old Schools, Abandoned Quarry. Police station. Radio towers. Cane fields. And the mighty Clarence River

=== Woodford Island Nature Reserve ===
The Woodford Island nature reserve (proclaimed in 1999) protects only a small part of the island, largely the higher elevation areas along the Woodford Island Ridge, and protects dry forest as well as providing habitat for threatened animal species.

Threatened and vulnerable plant species found or predicted to be found in the reserve:

- Marsdenia liisae
- Eucalyptus psammitica
- Eucalyptus tetrapleura
- Angophora robur
- Paspalidium grandispiculatum
- Callistemon acuminatus
- Melichrus hirsutus
- Leucopogon recurvicepalus
