= Lawrence Museum =

- Location within New South Wales
- Established: 2004
- Location: 2 Merton Street, Lawrence, New South Wales
- Coordinates: 29°49′18.0″S 153°11′39.8″E
- Type: Telecommunications & History Museum
- Collections: Telecommunications, River & Rural Farm Machinery
- President: Robert Forbes
- Public transit access: Rutland Street (Before Lawrence Ferry, Lawrence Side)
- Parking: On-site
- Website: www.facebook.com/lawrencemuseum

The Lawrence Museum is a museum in Lawrence, New South Wales. It is situated in the former 2NR Broadcasting Station and operated by the Lawrence Historical Society. The museum contains artefacts associated with the history of telecommunications and radio broadcasting in Australia. It also contains photographs and artefacts related to the Lawrence Ferry.

== History ==
On 12 June 2004, the Museum was officially opened, by regional news editor ABC Radio Allan Rawson.
