= The Clarence River Advocate =

Former Australian newspaper

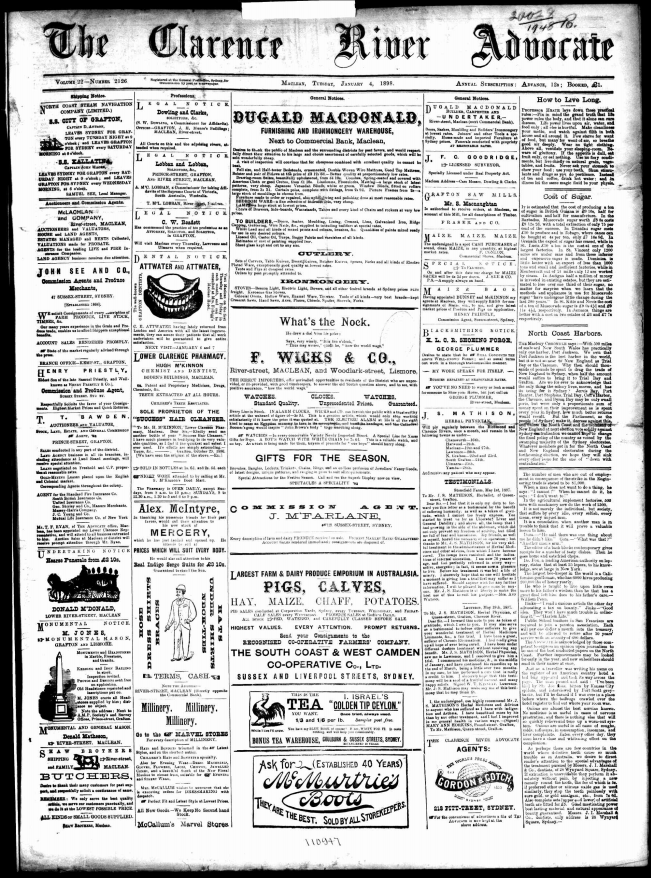
Clarence River Advocate 4 January 1898

The Clarence River Advocate was a newspaper published in Maclean, New South Wales, Australia from 1877 to 22 September 1949. It has also been published as the Clarence River Advocate and General Advertiser and the Lower Clarence Advocate.

== History ==
The Clarence River Advocate was first published in 1877 as the Lower Clarence Advocate. The first issue was published by W. R. Baker and James Madgwick on 28 December 1877. The paper was edited and published by Baker until 1889 from an office next to Maclean Post Office. John S. Dunnet bought the paper in 1888, and later sold on the paper to David T. Burt in 1896. The paper was later owned by Henry J. Holt (1903–1908), Hedley Lobban (1908 – 1915) and E. A. Powell (1915–1949).

== Digitisation ==
This paper has been digitised as part of the Australian Newspapers Digitisation Program project of the National Library of Australia.

== See also ==
- List of newspapers in Australia
- List of newspapers in New South Wales
