= Lawrence, New South Wales =

Lawrence New South Wales
- Coordinates: 29°30′S 153°06′E
- Population: 925 (2021 census)
- Postcode(s): 2460
- LGA(s): Clarence Valley Council
- State electorate(s): Clarence
- Federal division(s): Page

Lawrence is a small town 13 km from Maclean, New South Wales, Australia. It is accessed by the Lawrence car ferry from Woodford Island or by travelling 30 kilometres north from Grafton. At the 2021 census, the population of Lawrence was 925.

== Settlement ==
The first Irishman into the area was Richard Craig. Craig had escaped from the Moreton Bay convict settlement in 1830. Travelling South Craig had discovered the two big rivers in northern NSW, the Richmond and the Clarence. When he returned to the Port Macquarie penal settlement he revealed the existence of these rivers and was recruited to act as a guide for prospective settlers to the area. The first settlers were cedar-cutters.

In 1842 William Robertson took a claim of 15,000 acres centred on the future township of Lawrence and named it "Lanark Lodge" after his childhood home in Scotland. Due to its locality Lawrence was the closest port from the tablelands future north. Traders and farmers began shipping their produce and minerals from Lawrence down to Sydney. In 1856 Jack Pringle built a road to service the inland communities. Lawrence at this time was a major alternative to the southern port in Grafton.

Lawrence settlers had the difficulty of dealing with ten major floods in seven years during the 1870s. When the Railway arrived in Tenterfield in 1886 the demand for services in Lawrence dwindled.

Historical population
Year	Pop.	±%
1971	223	—
1976	269	+20.6%
1981	325	+20.8%
1986	306	−5.8%
1991	328	+7.2%
1996	366	+11.6%
2001	426	+16.4%
2006	390	−8.5%
2011	740	+89.7%
2016	837	+13.1%
2021	925	+10.5%
Source: Australian Bureau of Statistics data.

== Facilities ==
Lawrence has a number of sporting facilities including, a cricket field and soccer fields, a nine-hole golf course and tennis courts. Lawrence has a public school, a general store, post office, police station, Tavern and a local school and route bus service. It also has a museum (Lawrence Museum) housed in the old radio station building as well as very well preserved Public Hall of timber construction dating from 1892. The town is in the Clarence Valley Council local government area.

Archie Roach's brother was named after the town, and he writes about a visit to the town he made in 2013. He was able to reconnect with some of the history of his father's Bundjalung family, after he saw a huge photo of the family in the museum.
