= Lawrence Ferry =

Cable ferry across the Clarence River in New South Wales, Australia

Coordinates: 29.494448°S 153.114867°E

The Bluff Point Ferry, Lawrence (commonly known as the Lawrence Ferry) is a cable ferry across the Clarence River in New South Wales, Australia. The ferry operates between the town of Lawrence and Woodford Island, and forms part of the route east from Lawrence to the coast. It is the busiest vehicular ferry in New South Wales.

The ferry is operated by a private sector operator under contract to Transport for NSW. The ferry operates on demand 24 hours day, 7 days a week. If the ferry is not in operation, the alternatives are a 38 kilometres (24 mi) detour via the Ulmarra Ferry, or a 67 kilometres (42 mi) detour via the bridge at Grafton.
