= McFarlane Bridge =

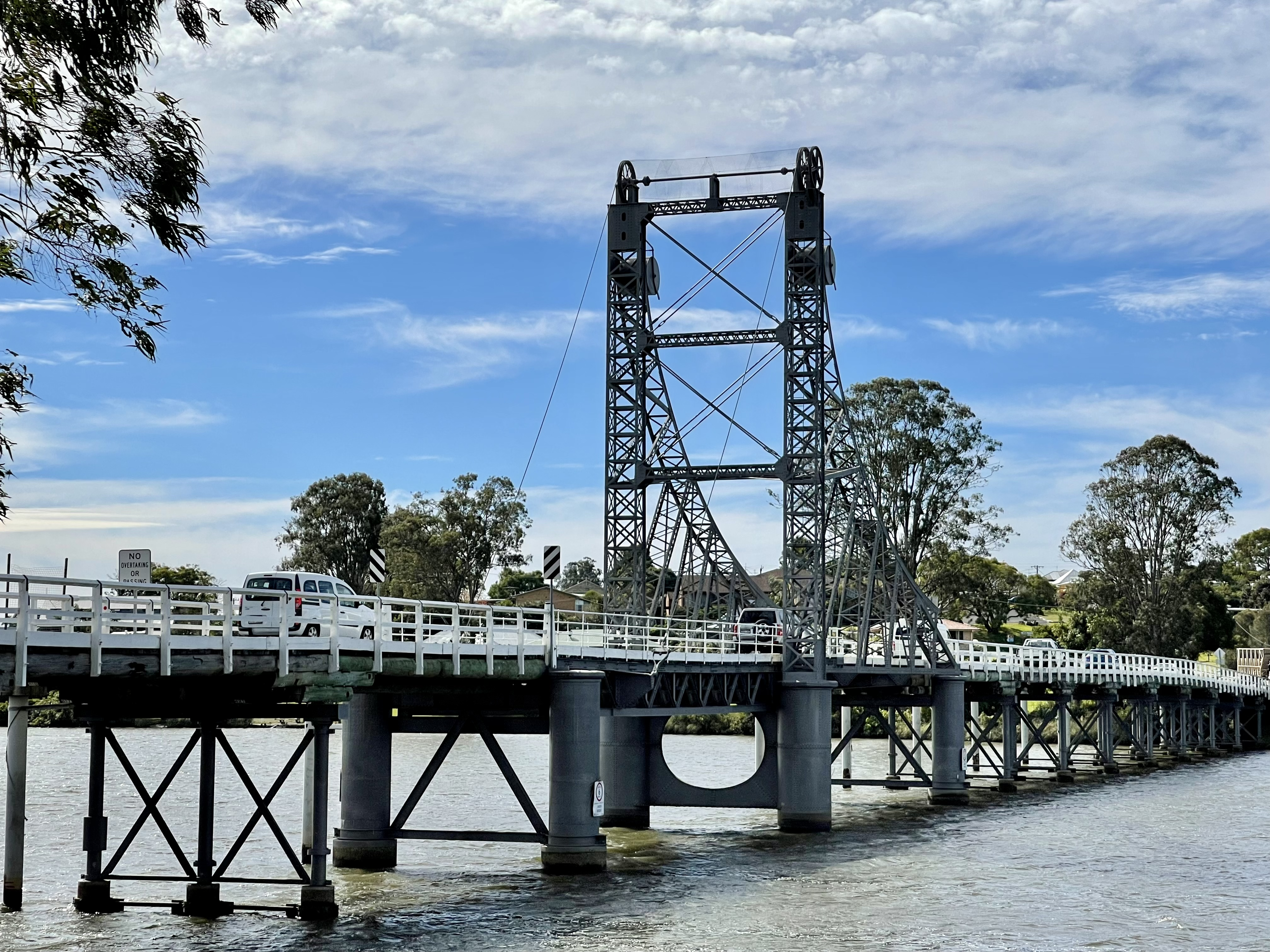
- Coordinates: 29°27′54″S 153°11′48″E
- Carries: Lawrence Road: Motor vehicles; Pedestrians
- Crosses: South arm of the Clarence River
- Locale: Maclean, New South Wales, Australia
- Named for: John McFarlane
- Owner: Transport for NSW

Characteristics
- Design: Beam bascule bridge with lifting span
- Material: Timber and wrought iron
- Longest span: 20.3 metres (67 ft)
- No. of spans: 17: 1 x 20.3 metres (67 ft); 16 x 13.7 metres (45 ft)

History
- Engineering design by: Ernest de Burgh
- Constructed by: Mountney and Company
- Construction start: 1904
- Construction end: 1906
- Opened: 9 April 1906

Location
- Interactive map of McFarlane Bridge

The McFarlane Bridge is a road bridge that carries Lawrence Road across the south arm of the Clarence River at Maclean, New South Wales, Australia. The bridge connects the communities of Maclean and Woodford Island.

== Description ==
The bridge has 16 timber beam spans of 13.7 metres (45 ft) and one wrought iron and timber lifting span of 20.3 metres (67 ft) supported by cast iron piers. The deck of the whole bridge is sawn hardwood. It was designed by Ernest de Burgh and constructed by Mountney and Company between 1904 and 1906.

The central bascule-type lifting span, notable for its cardioid counterweight track, became redundant and it was last opened for shipping in 1962. The bridge was named in honour of John McFarlane, the Member for the Clarence.

The history of the bridge was memorialised in a book The Centenary Of Mcfarlane Bridge Maclean 1906-2006 published by the Maclean District Historical Society.

The bridge is an important link in the area carrying significant road traffic. As a number of components of the bridge require replacement, the major refurbishment work of the bridge was carried out from June 2012 to June 2013.

== Engineering heritage award ==
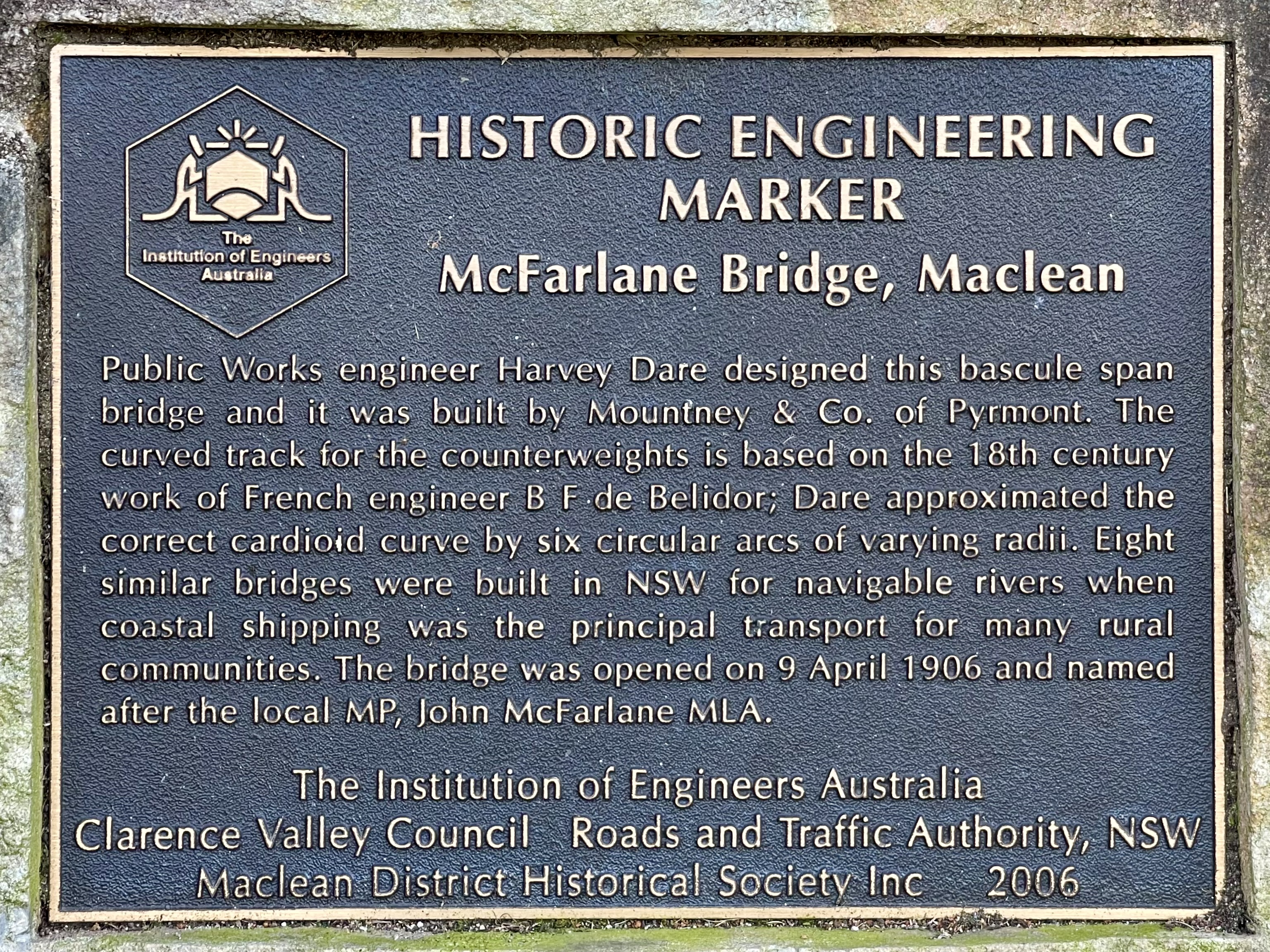
Historic Engineering Marker

The bridge received a Historic Engineering Marker from Engineers Australia as part of its Engineering Heritage Recognition Program.

== See also ==
- Historic bridges of New South Wales
- List of bridges in Australia
