= Ulmarra Ferry =

Cable ferry across the Clarence River in New South Wales, Australia

Coordinates: 29.621063°S 153.030109°E

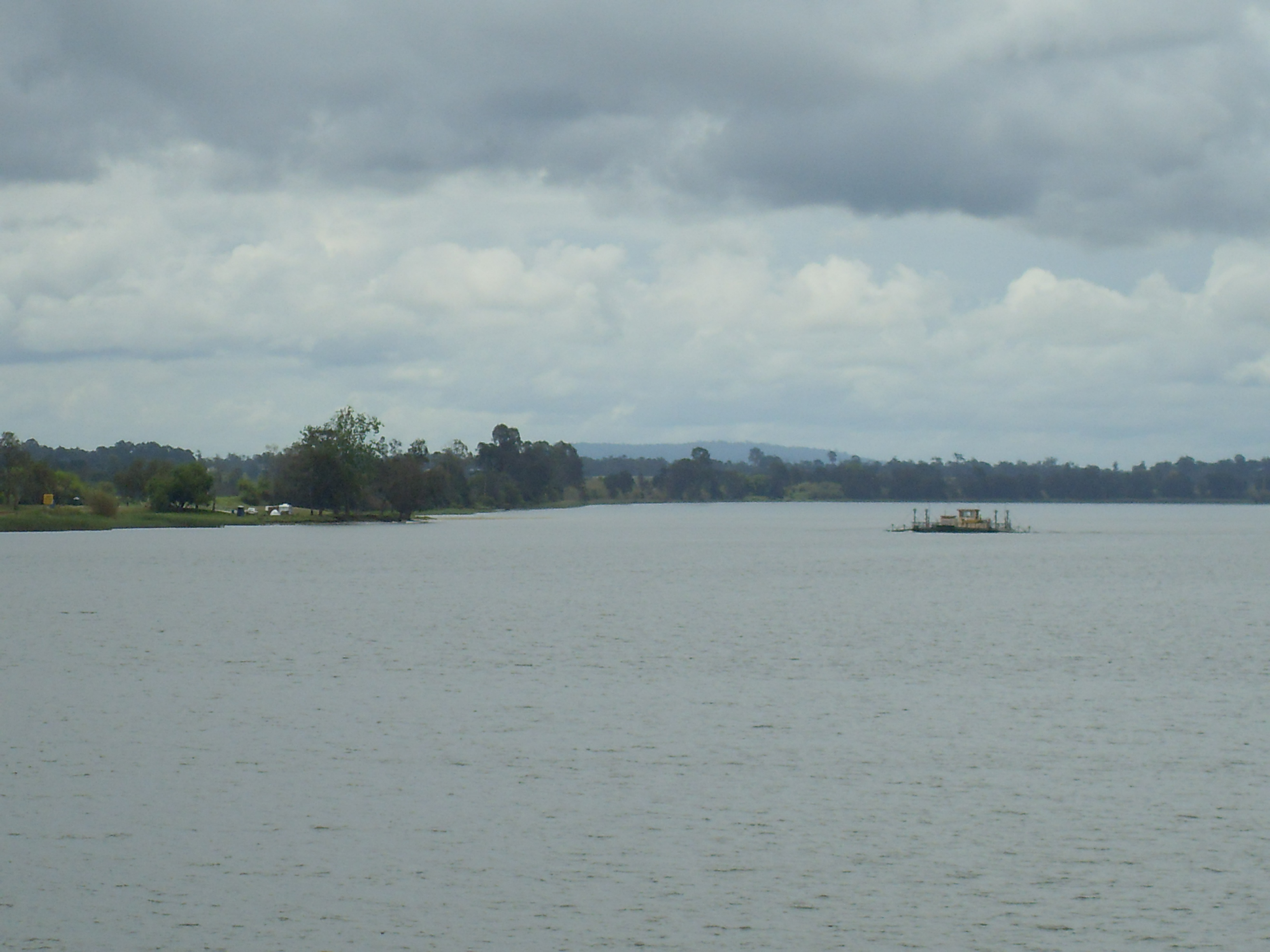
Ulmarra Ferry in mid-stream

The Ulmarra Ferry was a cable ferry across the Clarence River in New South Wales, Australia. It operated between Ulmarra and Southgate.

The ferry was operated by a private sector operator under contract to Transport for NSW. The ferry operated on demand from 06:00 to 23:00, seven days a week, with three 45 minute breaks during the day. It was closed for maintenance every Sunday from 06:00 to 08:00 and on the first Wednesday of each month from 09:30 to 11:30. When the ferry was not in operation, the alternatives were a 30 kilometres (19 mi) detour via the bridge at Grafton, or a 38 kilometres (24 mi) detour via the Lawrence Ferry.

The ferry was decommissioned on 10 June 2024 due to low usage and maintenance.
