= Gulmarrad, New South Wales =

Gulmarrad
- Town
- Coordinates: 29°29′S 153°14′E
- Country: Australia
- State: New South Wales
- LGA: Clarence Valley Council
- Established: 1830s

Government
  - State electorate: Clarence
  - Federal division: Page

Population
  - Total: 1,950 (2021 census)
- Postcode: 2463
- Mean max temp: 38.0 °C (100.4 °F)
- Mean min temp: −5.0 °C (23.0 °F)
- Annual rainfall: 1,463.7 mm (57.63 in)

Gulmarrad is a locality contiguous to the town of Maclean in the Northern Rivers region of New South Wales, Australia. The area is mostly zoned rural residential. Brooms Head Road passes through the middle of the community.

Gulmarrad is located within the Clarence Valley local government area. In the 2021 census, its population is listed as 1,950.

Gulmarrad has a Jehovah's Witness meeting place on The Selection (Causley Farm Estate).

There are no retail shopping facilities at Gulmarrad. The closest shop, a small general store, bottle shop and service station located at nearby Townsend. The local Post Office and full retail facilities are available at the town of Maclean five kilometres away, which shares the same 2463 postcode. The locality is geographically 35 km. north-east of Grafton.

Gulmarrad Rural Fire Service is headquartered on Brooms Head Road adjacent to Sheehans Lane.

== Roads ==
The main road through the community is the Brooms Head Road. The main residential thoroughfares being Sheehans Lane, McIntyres lane, Major Mitchell Dr, Rosella Rd, Colonial Dr and Rosella Rd.

== Schools ==
Gulmarrad has a highly regarded public school Gulmarrad Public School. Established 1891. The main High School for the district is Maclean High School. Maclean High School Busways Bus List.

== Housing ==
Gulmarrad average building block size is over one acre with prices starting at ~ A$450,000. Gulmarrad has several housing estates such as Stockman's Rest, McIntyre's Ridge, Causley Farm, Whispering Pines, Tanedra Estate and Cameron Hill. Lincoln Place a community for the over 55's located on Sheehans Lane is currently being developed.

== Public Transport ==
Gulmarrad has no public transport apart from school buses. Bus services to Yamba, Iluka and Grafton stop at Maclean. The nearest Rail Station is Grafton Station a 40-minute drive away.
