= Ulmarra =

- Town
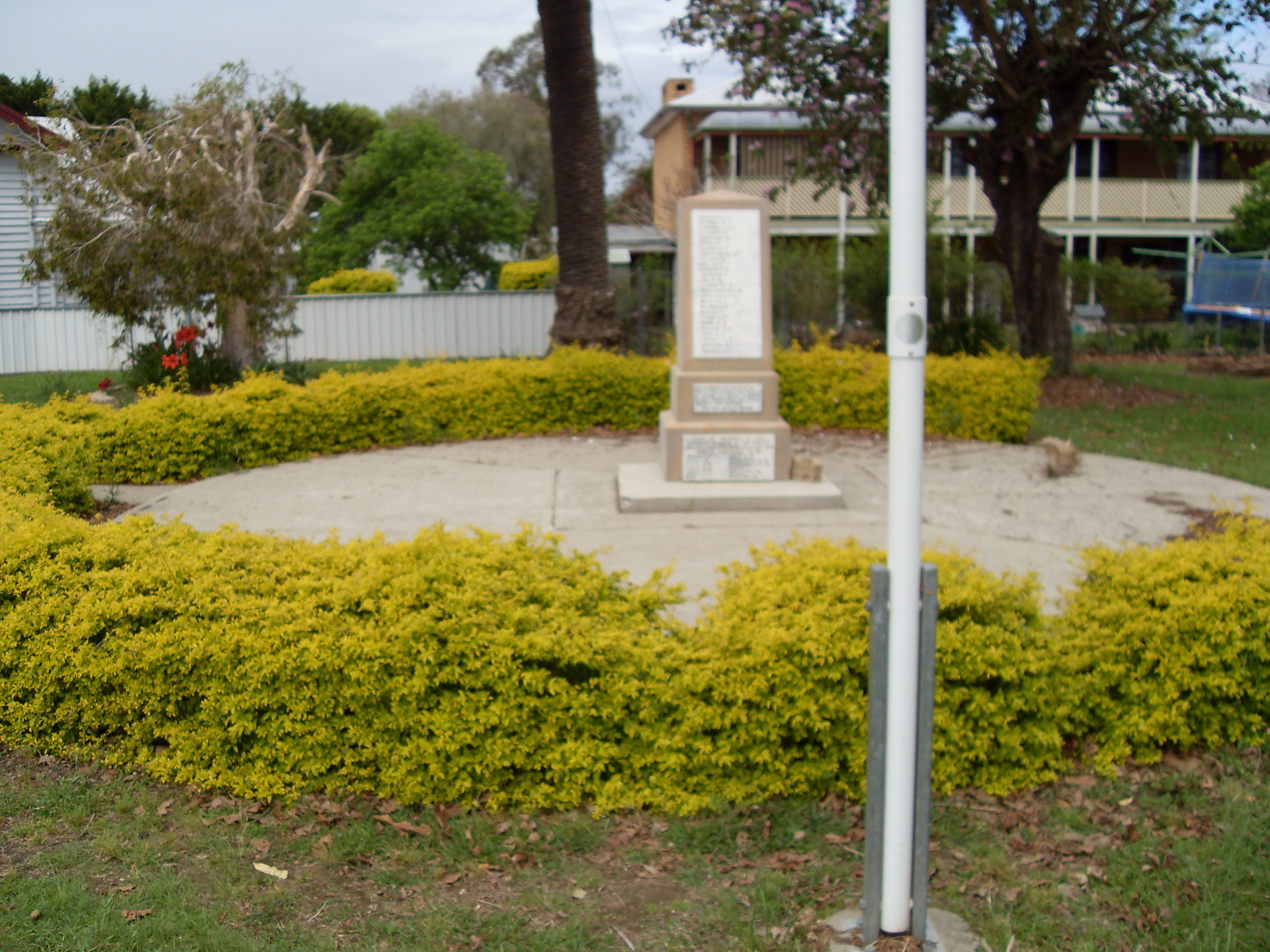
- Ulmarra War Memorial, Coldstream Street, beside the Clarence River

- Coordinates: 29°38′S 153°02′E
- Country: Australia
- State: New South Wales
- LGA: Clarence Valley

Government
  - State electorate: Clarence
  - Federal division: Page

Population
  - Total: 418 (2021 census)
- Postcode: 2462

Ulmarra is a small town on the south bank of the Clarence River in New South Wales, Australia in the Clarence Valley district. At the 2021 census, Ulmarra had a population of 418.

The town had the distinction of being the smallest local government area of New South Wales until 2000 when it amalgamated with the Nymboida Shire to form Pristine Waters Shire, which later merged with Copmanhurst, Grafton and Maclean Shires to become the Clarence Valley Council.

Ulmarra's name comes from an Aboriginal word meaning "Bend in the river".

The Ulmarra Ferry was a vehicular cable ferry, which crosses the Clarence River from a point about 1 kilometre (0.62 mi) north of Ulmarra, to Southgate on the north bank. It closed in June 2024.

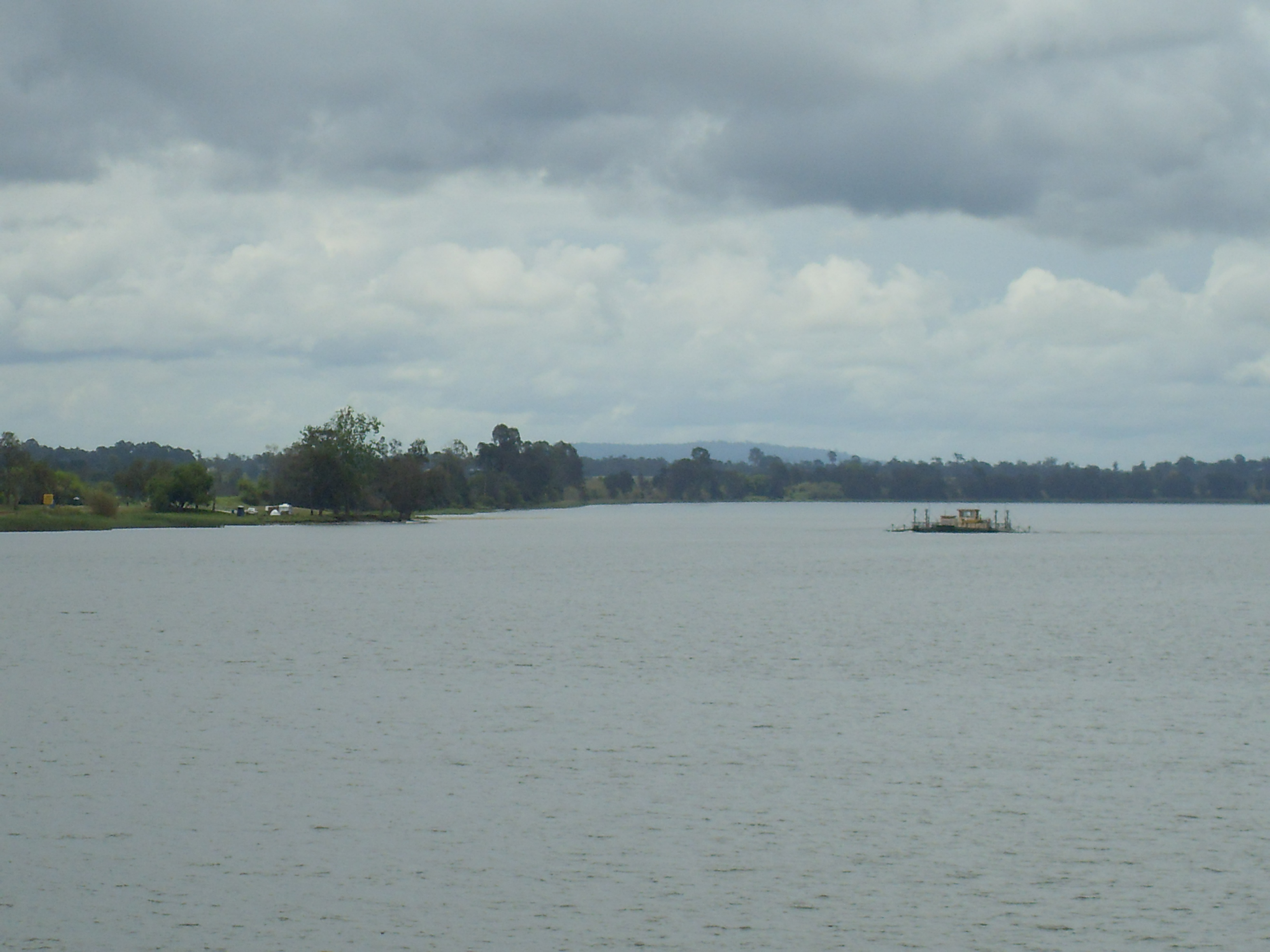
The Clarence River, with the Ulmarra Ferry

Historical population
| Year | Pop. | ±% |
|---|---|---|
| 1921 | 2,008 | — |
| 1933 | 1,985 | −1.1% |
| 1947 | 1,633 | −17.7% |
| 1954 | 1,499 | −8.2% |
| 1961 | | — |
| 1966 | | — |
| 1971 | 358 | — |
| 1976 | 362 | +1.1% |
| 1981 | 395 | +9.1% |
| 1986 | 462 | +17.0% |
| 1991 | 508 | +10.0% |
| 1996 | 472 | −7.1% |
| 2001 | 492 | +4.2% |
| 2006 | 446 | −9.3% |
| 2011 | 435 | −2.5% |
| 2016 | 437 | +0.5% |
| 2021 | 418 | −4.3% |
Source: Australian Bureau of Statistics data.
