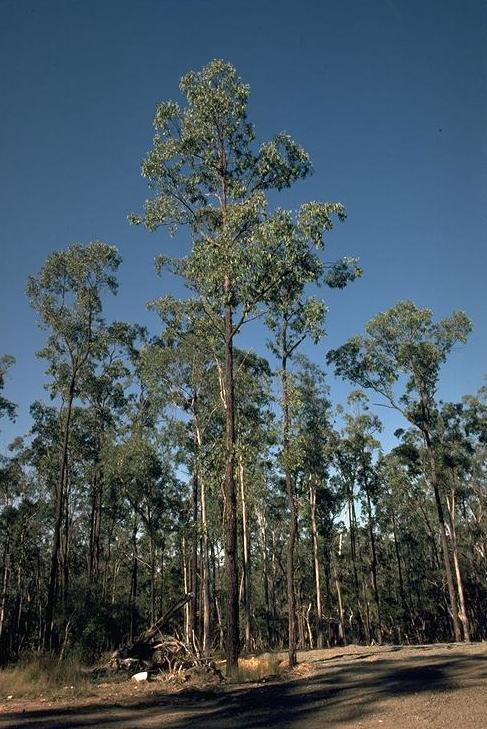

Scientific classification
- Kingdom: Plantae
- Clade: Tracheophytes
- Clade: Angiosperms
- Clade: Eudicots
- Clade: Rosids
- Order: Myrtales
- Family: Myrtaceae
- Genus: Eucalyptus
- Species: E. tetrapleura

Binomial name
- Eucalyptus tetrapleura L.A.S.Johnson

= Eucalyptus tetrapleura =

Square-fruited ironbark

Species of eucalyptus

Eucalyptus tetrapleura, commonly known as the square-fruited ironbark, is a species of small to medium-sized tree that is endemic to northern New South Wales. It has thick, dark ironbark on the trunk and branches, lance-shaped to curved adult leaves, flower buds in groups of seven, white flowers and conical fruit that is square in cross-section.

== Description ==
Eucalyptus tetrapleura is a tree that typically grows to a height of 30 m (98 ft) and forms a lignotuber. It has thick, rough, dark grey, furrowed ironbark on the trunk and branches. Young plants and coppice regrowth have egg-shaped to lance-shaped leaves that are 70–145 mm (2.8–5.7 in) long and 20–60 mm (0.79–2.36 in) wide. Adult leaves are arranged alternately, the same shade of dull green on both sides, lance-shaped to curved, 80–200 mm (3.1–7.9 in) long and 17–34 mm (0.67–1.34 in) wide tapering to a petiole 10–31 mm (0.39–1.22 in) long. The flower buds are mostly arranged on the ends of branchlets in groups of seven on a branching peduncle 10–30 mm (0.39–1.18 in) long, the individual buds on pedicels 8–11 mm (0.31–0.43 in) long. Mature buds are an elongated diamond shape, square in cross section, 12–14 mm (0.47–0.55 in) long and 4–6 mm (0.16–0.24 in) wide with a conical operculum. Flowering occurs between June and August and the flowers are white. The fruit is a woody, conical capsule that is square in cross-section, 7–10 mm (0.28–0.39 in) long and 5–8 mm (0.20–0.31 in) wide with the valves enclosed.

== Taxonomy and naming ==
Eucalyptus tetrapleura was first formally described in 1962 by Lawrie Johnson in Anderson's paper in Contributions from the New South Wales National Herbarium. The specific epithet (tetrapleura) is from ancient Greek words meaning "four" and "rib", referring to the four ribs of the fruit.

== Distribution and habitat ==
The square-fruited ironbark grows in open forest on poorly-drained soil on slightly sloping ground between Casino and Grafton in northern New South Wales.
