= Maclean, New South Wales =

Maclean
- Town
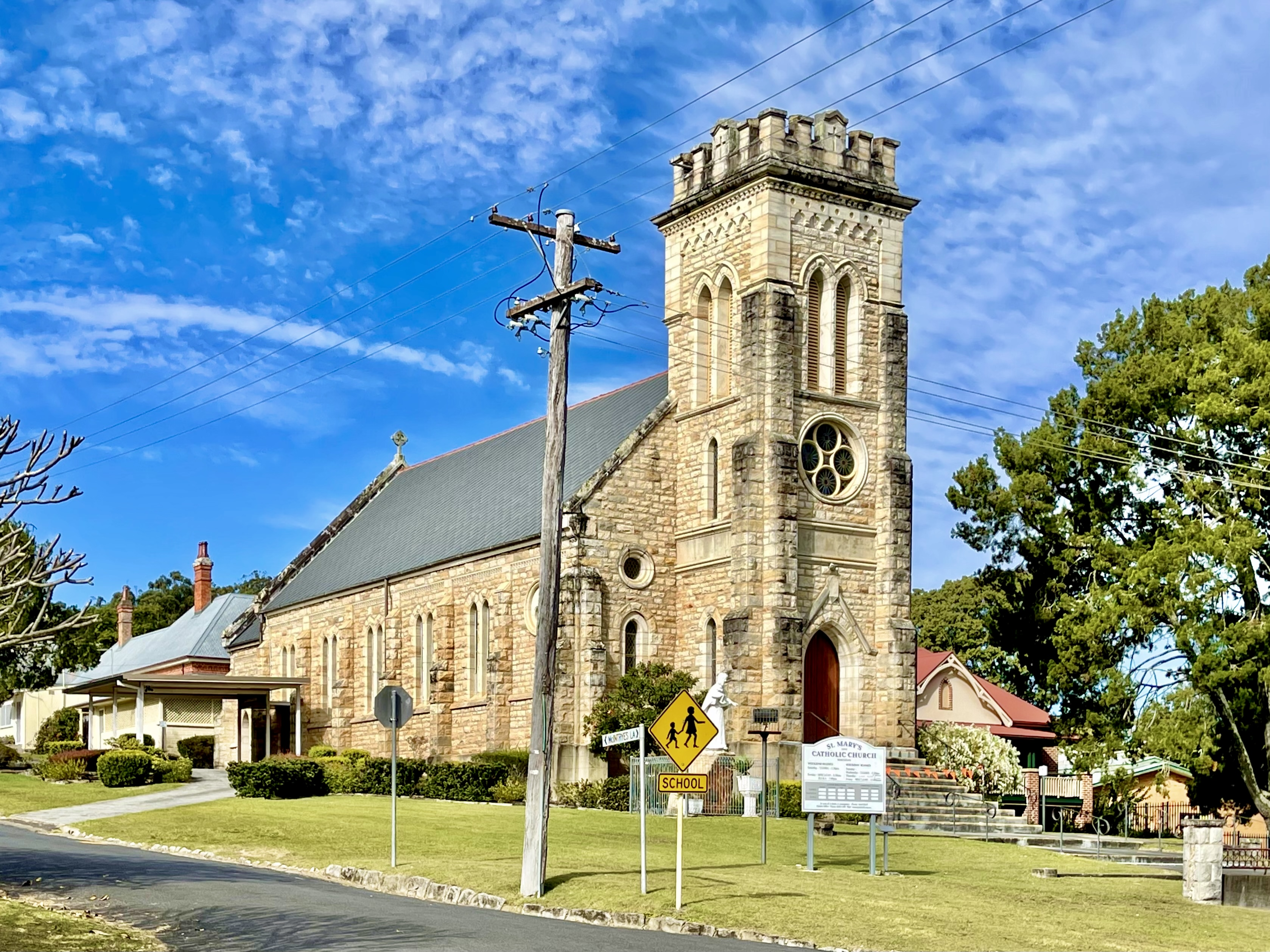
- St Mary's Catholic Church

- Coordinates: 29°27′S 153°12′E
- Country: Australia
- State: New South Wales
- LGA: Clarence Valley Council
- Location: 658 km (409 mi) NE of Sydney; 46 km (29 mi) NE of Grafton; 18 km (11 mi) SW of Yamba; 272 km (169 mi) S of Brisbane

Government
  - State electorate: Clarence
  - Federal division: Page
- Elevation: 9 m (30 ft)

Population
  - Total: 2,778, The total urban area inc contiguous suburbs, Townsend & Gulmarrad (2,463 postcode) is 8,304 (2021 census)
- Postcode: 2463

Maclean is a town in Clarence Valley local government area in the Northern Rivers region of New South Wales, Australia. It is on the Clarence River and near the Pacific Highway. At the 2021 census, Maclean had a population of 2,778, and the total urban area including Townsend and Gulmarrad (postcode 2463) is more than 8,304.

The Maclean, Yamba and Iluka area known as the Lower Clarence had a combined population of 17,533. Its industries are tourism, sugar cane production, farming and river-prawn trawling. Together with Grafton, Maclean is the shared administrative centre for the Clarence Valley Council local government area.

== Geography ==
Maclean is nestled at the base of Mt Maclean and the shoreline of the Clarence River where the river reunites after splitting around Woodford Island. A bridge connects Woodford Island to Maclean. It is part of the Tourist Drive 22. During times of heavy rain the town is under threat of flooding by the surging waters of the river.

The Pacific Highway bypass of Maclean was opened in 1966 in conjunction with the first Harwood Bridge over the South Channel of the Clarence. The bypass was duplicated and the bridge superseded by a four-lane bridge in 2020 (the 1966 bridge has been retained for local traffic).

== History ==
The area was originally inhabited by the Gumbaingirr or Yaygir Indigenous peoples. Matthew Flinders landed near the mouth of the Clarence River in 1799, naming it Shoal Bay, but dismissed the area as "deserving of no more than a superficial examination".

Several escaped convicts from Moreton Bay passed through the area on their way south in the 1820s and 30s, with one convict (Richard Craig) reporting a "big river" on the way.

In 1838, Thomas Small sent his brother and two dozen sawyers from Sydney on board the Susan down the "big river," becoming the first vessel to pass down the river. Attracted by the large amount of red cedar growing in the area, Small settled on Woodford Island at the end of the year. The following year, Governor Sir George Gipps named the river the Clarence in honour of the Duke of Clarence. Soon after, the name Rocky Mouth was given to the area now known as Maclean.

The township was officially laid out in 1862 and named after Alexander Grant McLean, the Surveyor-General, by the Grafton Commissioner for Lands, W.A.B. Greaves. Many of the early settlers came from the Scottish Highlands, with numerous Irish and German immigrants also settling.

The arrival of Europeans forced the Yaegl people off their land and they were forced into smaller settlements. Several massacres of Indigenous people by settlers were recorded along the Clarence River. By 1880, Ulgundahi Island had become a site of occupation by some of the displaced Yaegls.

Early crops in the area were maize and cotton, before sugar began to take over as the dominant crop by the mid-1860s. The Harwood Sugar Mill opened in 1874 and is Australia's oldest continuously operating sugar mill.

In 1887, Maclean was declared a municipality.

The Ashby Ferry opened between Maclean and Ashby in 1890, travelling across the Clarence River from MacNaughton Place. It was proposed in as part of a railway line which was to run from Grafton to Tweed, crossing the Clarence River at Maclean to Ashby and heading north to Coraki, so as to minimise the amount of river crossings required. This ferry was hand-winched to get across the river and was replaced by a steam ferry in 1920. The steam ferry was replaced by an old Bluff Point Ferry in 1974, but was still used as a relief ferry until 1981 when it was decommissioned and put on display at the Ferry Park. The ferry crossing became a public boat ramp when the bridge connecting Ashby to Chatsworth Island opened in 1981.

In 1906, the McFarlane Bridge opened over the South Arm of the Clarence River, providing easier access between Maclean and Woodford Island. It last opened to allow boats through in 1962.

In 1957, Maclean became a shire.

The high school moved to its current site on Woombah Street in 1961. It was previously on the same site as the primary school.

The town suffered an economic downturn after the Pacific Highway bypassed it in 1966, with sugar prices dropping sharply. In order to attract tourists to the area, the town leant on its Scottish heritage, with the Scottish Cairn constructed.

As part of the torch relay ahead of the 2000 Summer Olympics in Sydney, several of the power poles around the town were painted with Scottish tartans. Originally, only 100 were painted, however there are now around 240 in Maclean and surrounds.

In 2004, Maclean Shire was forcibly amalgamated with Grafton City and several other small local councils to form the Clarence Valley Council.

As of January 2026, Maclean was the home of the oldest continuously running single location grocery store in Australia. It opened in 1883 under the name Argyle Store, was later renamed Wingfield's, and was converted into a supermarket in 1969.

Historical population
Year	Pop.	±%
1921	1,492	—
1933	1,588	+6.4%
1947	1,665	+4.8%
1954	1,698	+2.0%
1961	1,804	+6.2%
1966	2,231	+23.7%
1971	2,337	+4.8%
1976	2,488	+6.5%
1981	2,593	+4.2%
1986	2,681	+3.4%
1991	2,890	+7.8%
1996	3,157	+9.2%
2001	3,232	+2.4%
2006	3,245	+0.4%
2011	3,417	+5.3%
2016	3,518	+3.0%
2021	3,702	+5.2%
Source: Australian Bureau of Statistics data. Note: from 2011, figures include population of neighbouring Townsend.

== Flooding ==
Due to its location on the banks of the Clarence River, Maclean has recorded over 100 floods since the town was settled by Europeans. There were three floods recorded in 1890, then nothing from 1893 until 1921. Another flood followed in 1928, then a disastrous period from 1945 to 1956 when numerous floods were recorded, including four in 1950 alone. The June flood of that year was the largest recorded since 1890. Large floods were recorded in 1963 and 1967, before record floods were recorded in 1974, with the flood of 2001 exceeding that mark. Markers indicating the height of the 2001 flood can be found on some poles around town.

The levee wall was constructed after the 2001 flood, saving Maclean from inundation during the 2009, 2011, 2013 and 2021 floods, however the town was still isolated after both roads to the highway were cut.

Despite some cracks forming in the levee, Maclean narrowly avoided being completely inundated during the 2022 floods. Several low-lying parts of the town, including the Showground and Cameron Park were still flooded.

== Heritage listings ==
Maclean has a number of heritage-listed sites, including:

- Clarence River by North Arm: Ulgundahi Island

== Culture ==
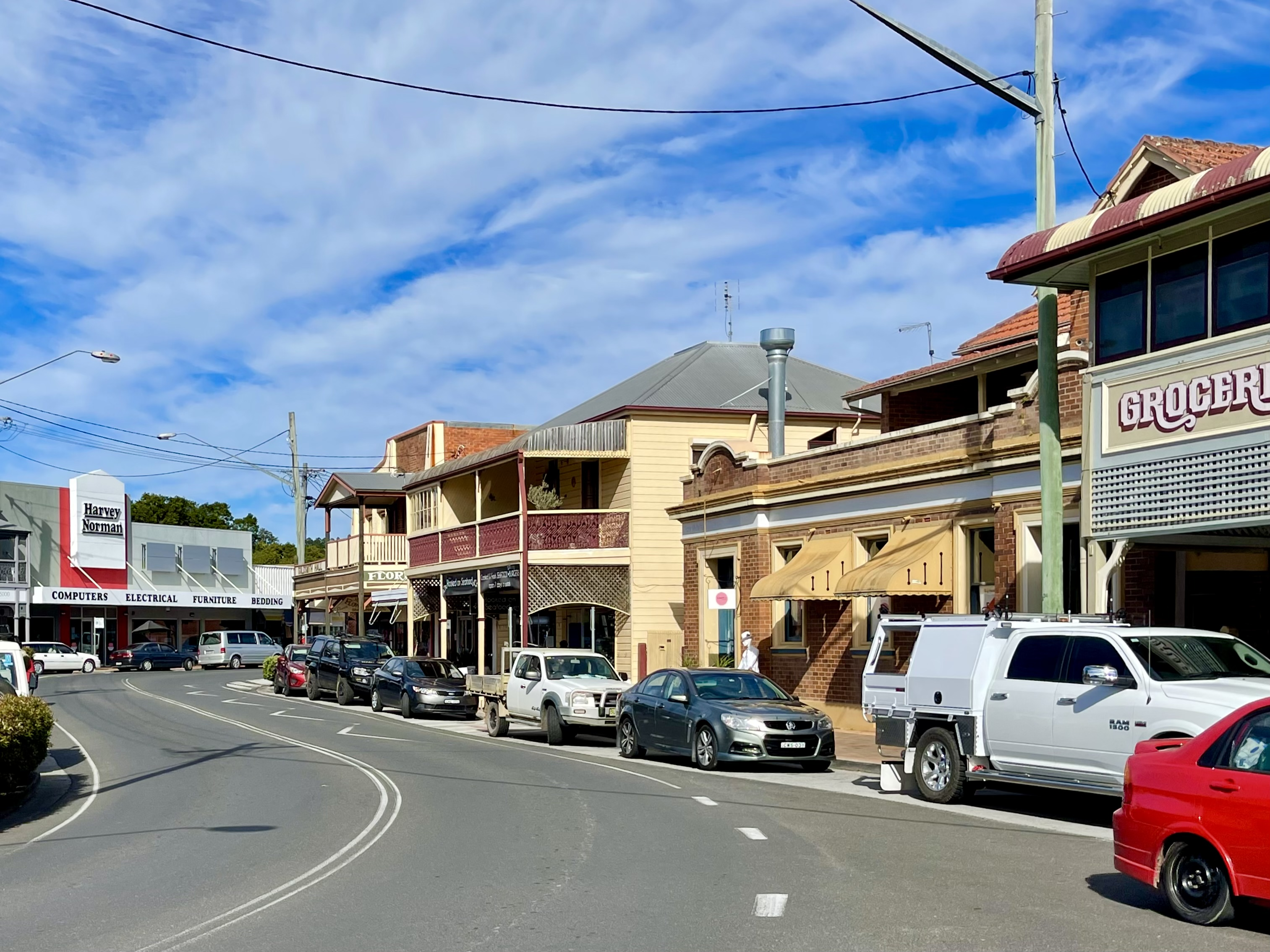
River Street

The popular Maclean Highland Gathering has been held for over 100 years during the Easter weekend. Participants and bands contest traditional Scottish athletic and cultural competitions, such as caber tossing, highland dancing, band competition, and bagpiping. The "Maclean, The Scottish Town In Australia Association", is a community group which was formed in 1986 under the initiative of former bank manager Mr Graham Leach, and works to promote Maclean's strong Scottish origins. The work of this committee over the years has ensured that Maclean now has national and international recognition as 'The Scottish Town' in Australia.

Many street signs are written in English and Scottish Gaelic, power poles are painted with tartan patterns, and a stone cairn has been erected in Herb Stanford Park.

The Maclean Agricultural Show was first held in 1896 and has been held almost every since, only missing a handful of occasions due to things like flooding, storm damage and COVID-19.

== Sport ==
Maclean is home to several local sporting teams. It's the central town for the Lower Clarence Cricket Association, with a turf wicket at Barry Watts Oval and three synthetic pitches at Wherrett Park. Maclean Bobcats compete in the Football Far North Coast competition and play home games at Barry Watts Oval during the winter months. Junior sport, including rugby league and soccer, as well as school sport, is also played at Wherrett Park. The Lower Clarence Netball Association plays games at the adjacent Chris O'Connell Netball Courts.

The Maclean Indoor Sports Centre is also located within the Wherrett Park complex, as is the Maclean skate park.

The Lower Clarence Magpies formerly played home games at the Maclean Showground, but relocated to Yamba in the mid-2010s.

Rowing was the dominant sport in the early years of the town, with the Lower Clarence Rowing Club forming in 1885.

MacNaughton Park on the site of the present primary school hosted many sports prior to 1900, but was quickly replaced. Jubilee Park was the former home of Maclean sports and was located behind the Maclean Bowling Club and Maclean Olympic Pool. It suffered extensive damage in the 1974 flood and closed shortly after. These days the site is occupied by IGA, a carpark and Cameron Park.

== Schools ==
- Maclean Public School
- St Joseph's Primary School
- Pacific Valley Christian School
- Maclean High School

== Newspapers ==
- The Daily Examiner
- The Coastal Views
- Clarence Valley Review
- The Independent
- The Northern Rivers Times
