= Harwood Mill =

Historical industrial site

Coordinates: 29.425°S 153.248°E

The Harwood Sugar Mill (also known as Sunshine Sugar Mill) is located on Harwood Island on the Clarence River in the Northern Rivers region in north-eastern New South Wales, Australia. It began operations in 1874, and is the oldest sugar cane crushing mill still operating in Australia. Harwood Mill is one of the three sugar mills in NSW with the other mills located at Condong on the Tweed River and Broadwater on the Richmond River.

Harwood mill is currently owned by the New South Wales Sugar Milling Co-operative, formed when cane growers purchased the three NSW sugar mills in 1978 from the Colonial Sugar Refining Company (CSR). CSR built and operated the three for-mentioned mills up until this time. The Harwood site, unlike most sugar mills also includes a sugar refinery (built in 1989) which converts the raw sugar produced by conventional mills into white sugars. The sugar produced by NSW mills is used primarily for domestic consumption.
